= List of New South Wales Legislative Councillors =

This is a list of New South Wales legislative councillors since the introduction of direct election in 1978.

== List ==
Council	Election	Councilor (Party)	Councilor (Party)	Councilor (Party)	Councilor (Party)	Councilor (Party)	Councilor (Party)	Councilor (Party)	Councilor (Party)	Councilor (Party)	Councilor (Party)	Councilor (Party)	Councilor (Party)	Councilor (Party)	Councilor (Party)	Councilor (Party)	Councilor (Party)	Councilor (Party)	Councilor (Party)	Councilor (Party)	Councilor (Party)	Councilor (Party)	Councilor (Party)	Councilor (Party)	Councilor (Party)	Election	Council	Election	Councilor (Party)	Councilor (Party)	Councilor (Party)	Councilor (Party)	Councilor (Party)	Councilor (Party)	Councilor (Party)	Councilor (Party)	Councilor (Party)	Councilor (Party)	Councilor (Party)	Councilor (Party)	Councilor (Party)	Councilor (Party)	Councilor (Party)	Councilor (Party)	Councilor (Party)	Councilor (Party)	Councilor (Party)	Councilor (Party)	Councilor (Party)	Election	Council
1978–1981	1978	43 Councillors		Kath Anderson (Labor)	Peter Baldwin (Labor)	Don Burton (Labor)	Frank Calabro (Liberal)	Fergus Darling (Liberal)	John Ducker (Labor)	Marie Fisher (Labor)	John Holt (Liberal)	Dorothy Isaksen (Labor)	Johno Johnson (Labor)	Adrian Solomons (NCP)	Norm King (Labor)	Delcia Kite (Labor)	Lloyd Lange (Liberal)	Toby MacDiarmid (NCP/ Independent)	John Morris (Labor)	Nathanael Orr (Liberal)	Bill Sandwith (Liberal)	Joe Thompson (Labor)	Roy Turner (Labor)	Barrie Unsworth (Labor)	Peter Watkins (Labor)	1978	1978-1981	1978	Bill Kennedy (NCP)	Jim Kaldis (Labor)	Clive Healey (Labor)	Jack Hallam (Labor)	Deirdre Grusovin (Labor)	Barney French (Labor)	Derek Freeman (Liberal)	Fred Duncan (Liberal)	Vacant	Leo Connellan (NCP)	Virginia Chadwick (Liberal)	Roger de Bryon-Faes (Liberal)	Paul Landa (Labor)	Vi Lloyd (Liberal)	Peter McMahon (Labor)	Herb McPherson (Labor)	Robert Melville (Labor)	Peter Philips (Liberal)	Ted Pickering (Liberal)	Bob Rowland Smith (NCP)	Max Willis (Liberal)	1978	1978-1981
1978–1981	1978	43 Councillors		Kath Anderson (Labor)	Peter Baldwin (Labor)	Don Burton (Labor)	Frank Calabro (Liberal)	Fergus Darling (Liberal)	John Ducker (Labor)	Marie Fisher (Labor)	John Holt (Liberal)	Dorothy Isaksen (Labor)	Johno Johnson (Labor)	Adrian Solomons (NCP)	Norm King (Labor)	Delcia Kite (Labor)	Lloyd Lange (Liberal)	Toby MacDiarmid (NCP/ Independent)	John Morris (Labor)	Nathanael Orr (Liberal)	Bill Sandwith (Liberal)	Joe Thompson (Labor)	Roy Turner (Labor)	Barrie Unsworth (Labor)	Peter Watkins (Labor)	1978	1978-1981	1978	Bill Kennedy (NCP)	Jim Kaldis (Labor)	Clive Healey (Labor)	Jack Hallam (Labor)	Deirdre Grusovin (Labor)	Barney French (Labor)	Derek Freeman (Liberal)	Fred Duncan (Liberal)	Jack Doohan (NCP)	Leo Connellan (NCP)	Virginia Chadwick (Liberal)	Roger de Bryon-Faes (Liberal)	Paul Landa (Labor)	Vi Lloyd (Liberal)	Peter McMahon (Labor)	Herb McPherson (Labor)	Robert Melville (Labor)	Peter Philips (Liberal)	Ted Pickering (Liberal)	Bob Rowland Smith (NCP)	Max Willis (Liberal)	1978	1978-1981
1978–1981	1979	43 Councillors		Kath Anderson (Labor)	Peter Baldwin (Labor)	Don Burton (Labor)	Frank Calabro (Liberal)	Fergus Darling (Liberal)	Ron Dyer (Labor)	Marie Fisher (Labor)	John Holt (Liberal)	Dorothy Isaksen (Labor)	Johno Johnson (Labor)	Adrian Solomons (NCP)	Norm King (Labor)	Delcia Kite (Labor)	Lloyd Lange (Liberal)	Toby MacDiarmid (NCP/ Independent)	John Morris (Labor)	Nathanael Orr (Liberal)	Bill Sandwith (Liberal)	Joe Thompson (Labor)	Roy Turner (Labor)	Barrie Unsworth (Labor)	Peter Watkins (Labor)	1979	1978-1981	1979	Bill Kennedy (NCP)	Jim Kaldis (Labor)	Clive Healey (Labor)	Jack Hallam (Labor)	Deirdre Grusovin (Labor)	Barney French (Labor)	Derek Freeman (Liberal)	Fred Duncan (Liberal)	Jack Doohan (NCP)	Leo Connellan (NCP)	Virginia Chadwick (Liberal)	Roger de Bryon-Faes (Liberal)	Paul Landa (Labor)	Vi Lloyd (Liberal)	Peter McMahon (Labor)	Herb McPherson (Labor)	Robert Melville (Labor)	Peter Philips (Liberal)	Ted Pickering (Liberal)	Bob Rowland Smith (NCP)	Max Willis (Liberal)	1979	1978-1981
1981–1984	1981	44 Councillors	Ken Reed (Labor)	George Brenner (politician) (Labor)	Peter Baldwin (Labor)	Don Burton (Labor)	Frank Calabro (Liberal)	Fergus Darling (Liberal)	Ron Dyer (Labor)	Marie Fisher (Labor)	John Holt (Liberal)	Dorothy Isaksen (Labor)	Johno Johnson (Labor)	Adrian Solomons (NCP)	Norm King (Labor)	Delcia Kite (Labor)	Lloyd Lange (Liberal)	Toby MacDiarmid (NCP/ Independent)	John Morris (Labor)	Nathanael Orr (Liberal)	Bill Sandwith (Liberal)	Joe Thompson (Labor)	Roy Turner (Labor)	Barrie Unsworth (Labor)	Peter Watkins (Labor)	1981	1981-1984	1981	Bill Kennedy (NCP)	Jim Kaldis (Labor)	Clive Healey (Labor)	Jack Hallam (Labor)	Deirdre Grusovin (Labor)	Barney French (Labor)	Jack Garland (Labor)	Fred Duncan (Liberal)	Jack Doohan (NCP)	Richard Killen (NCP)	Virginia Chadwick (Liberal)	John Matthews (Liberal)	Paul Landa (Labor)	Fred Nile (Call to Australia)	Elisabeth Kirkby (Democrat)	Franca Arena (Labor/ Independent)	Bryan Vaughan (Labor)	Peter Philips (Liberal)	Ted Pickering (Liberal)	Bob Rowland Smith (NCP)	Max Willis (Liberal)	1981	1981-1984
1981–1984	1981	44 Councillors	Ken Reed (Labor)	George Brenner (politician) (Labor)	Peter Baldwin (Labor)	Don Burton (Labor)	Frank Calabro (Liberal)	Derek Freeman (Liberal)	Ron Dyer (Labor)	Marie Fisher (Labor)	John Holt (Liberal)	Dorothy Isaksen (Labor)	Johno Johnson (Labor)	Adrian Solomons (NCP)	Norm King (Labor)	Delcia Kite (Labor)	Lloyd Lange (Liberal)	Toby MacDiarmid (NCP/ Independent)	John Morris (Labor)	Nathanael Orr (Liberal)	Bill Sandwith (Liberal)	Joe Thompson (Labor)	Roy Turner (Labor)	Barrie Unsworth (Labor)	Peter Watkins (Labor)	1981	1981-1984	1981	Bill Kennedy (NCP)	Jim Kaldis (Labor)	Clive Healey (Labor)	Jack Hallam (Labor)	Deirdre Grusovin (Labor)	Barney French (Labor)	Jack Garland (Labor)	Fred Duncan (Liberal)	Jack Doohan (NCP)	Richard Killen (NCP)	Virginia Chadwick (Liberal)	John Matthews (Liberal)	Paul Landa (Labor)	Fred Nile (Call to Australia)	Elisabeth Kirkby (Democrat)	Franca Arena (Labor/ Independent)	Bryan Vaughan (Labor)	Peter Philips (Liberal)	Ted Pickering (Liberal)	Bob Rowland Smith (NCP)	Max Willis (Liberal)	1981	1981-1984
1981–1984	1982	44 Councillors	Ken Reed (Labor)	George Brenner (politician) (Labor)	Ann Symonds (Labor)	Don Burton (Labor)	Frank Calabro (Liberal)	Derek Freeman (Liberal)	Ron Dyer (Labor)	Marie Fisher (Labor)	John Holt (Liberal)	Dorothy Isaksen (Labor)	Johno Johnson (Labor)	Adrian Solomons (NCP)	Norm King (Labor)	Delcia Kite (Labor)	Lloyd Lange (Liberal)	Toby MacDiarmid (NCP/ Independent)	John Morris (Labor)	Nathanael Orr (Liberal)	Bill Sandwith (Liberal)	Joe Thompson (Labor)	Roy Turner (Labor)	Barrie Unsworth (Labor)	Peter Watkins (Labor)	1982	1981-1984	1982	Bill Kennedy (NCP)	Jim Kaldis (Labor)	Clive Healey (Labor)	Jack Hallam (Labor)	Deirdre Grusovin (Labor)	Barney French (Labor)	Jack Garland (Labor)	Fred Duncan (Liberal)	Jack Doohan (NCP)	Richard Killen (NCP)	Virginia Chadwick (Liberal)	John Matthews (Liberal)	Paul Landa (Labor)	Fred Nile (Call to Australia)	Elisabeth Kirkby (Democrat)	Franca Arena (Labor/ Independent)	Bryan Vaughan (Labor)	Peter Philips (Liberal)	Ted Pickering (Liberal)	Bob Rowland Smith (NCP)	Max Willis (Liberal)	1982	1981-1984
1981–1984	1984	44 Councillors	Ken Reed (Labor)	George Brenner (politician) (Labor)	Ann Symonds (Labor)	Don Burton (Labor)	Frank Calabro (Liberal)	Derek Freeman (Liberal)	Ron Dyer (Labor)	Marie Fisher (Labor)	John Holt (Liberal)	Dorothy Isaksen (Labor)	Johno Johnson (Labor)	Adrian Solomons (NCP)	Norm King (Labor)	Delcia Kite (Labor)	Lloyd Lange (Liberal)	Toby MacDiarmid (NCP/ Independent)	John Morris (Labor)	Nathanael Orr (Liberal)	Bill Sandwith (Liberal)	Joe Thompson (Labor)	Roy Turner (Labor)	Barrie Unsworth (Labor)	Peter Watkins (Labor)	1984	1981-1984	1984	Bill Kennedy (NCP)	Jim Kaldis (Labor)	Clive Healey (Labor)	Jack Hallam (Labor)	Deirdre Grusovin (Labor)	Barney French (Labor)	Jack Garland (Labor)	Fred Duncan (Liberal)	Jack Doohan (NCP)	Richard Killen (NCP)	Virginia Chadwick (Liberal)	John Matthews (Liberal)	Vacant	Fred Nile (Call to Australia)	Elisabeth Kirkby (Democrat)	Franca Arena (Labor/ Independent)	Bryan Vaughan (Labor)	Peter Philips (Liberal)	Ted Pickering (Liberal)	Bob Rowland Smith (NCP)	Max Willis (Liberal)	1984	1981-1984
1984–1988	1984	Mick Ibbett (Labor)	Ken Reed (Labor)	George Brenner (politician) (Labor)	Ann Symonds (Labor)	Keith Enderbury (Labor)	Frank Calabro (Liberal)	Jim Samios (Liberal)	Ron Dyer (Labor)	Marie Fisher (Labor)	Beryl Evans (Liberal/ Seniors)	Dorothy Isaksen (Labor)	Johno Johnson (Labor)	Adrian Solomons (NCP)	Norm King (Labor)	Delcia Kite (Labor)	Lloyd Lange (Liberal)	Toby MacDiarmid (NCP/ Independent)	John Morris (Labor)	John Hannaford (Liberal)	John Jobling (Liberal)	Joe Thompson (Labor)	Richard Bull (National)	Barrie Unsworth (Labor)	Peter Watkins (Labor)	1984	1984-1988	1984	Judy Jakins (National)	Jim Kaldis (Labor)	Clive Healey (Labor)	Jack Hallam (Labor)	Deirdre Grusovin (Labor)	Barney French (Labor)	Jack Garland (Labor)	Jim Cameron (Call to Australia)	Jack Doohan (NCP)	Richard Killen (NCP)	Virginia Chadwick (Liberal)	John Matthews (Liberal)	Vacant	Fred Nile (Call to Australia)	Elisabeth Kirkby (Democrat)	Franca Arena (Labor/ Independent)	Bryan Vaughan (Labor)	Peter Philips (Liberal)	Ted Pickering (Liberal)	Bob Rowland Smith (NCP)	Max Willis (Liberal)	1984	1984-1988
1984–1988	1984	Mick Ibbett (Labor)	Ken Reed (Labor)	George Brenner (politician) (Labor)	Ann Symonds (Labor)	Keith Enderbury (Labor)	Frank Calabro (Liberal)	Jim Samios (Liberal)	Ron Dyer (Labor)	Marie Fisher (Labor)	Beryl Evans (Liberal/ Seniors)	Dorothy Isaksen (Labor)	Johno Johnson (Labor)	Adrian Solomons (NCP)	Norm King (Labor)	Delcia Kite (Labor)	Lloyd Lange (Liberal)	Toby MacDiarmid (NCP/ Independent)	Judith Walker (Labor)	John Hannaford (Liberal)	John Jobling (Liberal)	Joe Thompson (Labor)	Richard Bull (National)	Barrie Unsworth (Labor)	Peter Watkins (Labor)	1984	1984-1988	1984	Judy Jakins (National)	Jim Kaldis (Labor)	Clive Healey (Labor)	Jack Hallam (Labor)	Deirdre Grusovin (Labor)	Barney French (Labor)	Jack Garland (Labor)	Marie Bignold (Call to Australia/ Independent)	Jack Doohan (NCP)	Richard Killen (NCP)	Virginia Chadwick (Liberal)	John Matthews (Liberal)	Fred Hankinson (Labor)	Fred Nile (Call to Australia)	Elisabeth Kirkby (Democrat)	Franca Arena (Labor/ Independent)	Bryan Vaughan (Labor)	Peter Philips (Liberal)	Ted Pickering (Liberal)	Bob Rowland Smith (NCP)	Max Willis (Liberal)	1984	1984-1988
1984–1988	1985	Mick Ibbett (Labor)	Ken Reed (Labor)	George Brenner (politician) (Labor)	Ann Symonds (Labor)	Keith Enderbury (Labor)	Frank Calabro (Liberal)	Jim Samios (Liberal)	Ron Dyer (Labor)	Marie Fisher (Labor)	Beryl Evans (Liberal/ Seniors)	Dorothy Isaksen (Labor)	Johno Johnson (Labor)	Adrian Solomons (NCP)	Norm King (Labor)	Delcia Kite (Labor)	Lloyd Lange (Liberal)	Toby MacDiarmid (NCP/ Independent)	Judith Walker (Labor)	John Hannaford (Liberal)	John Jobling (Liberal)	Joe Thompson (Labor)	Richard Bull (National)	Barrie Unsworth (Labor)	Peter Watkins (Labor)	1985	1984-1988	1985	Judy Jakins (National)	Jim Kaldis (Labor)	Clive Healey (Labor)	Jack Hallam (Labor)	Deirdre Grusovin (Labor)	Barney French (Labor)	Jack Garland (Labor)	Marie Bignold (Call to Australia/ Independent)	Jack Doohan (NCP)	Richard Killen (NCP)	Virginia Chadwick (Liberal)	John Matthews (Liberal)	Fred Hankinson (Labor)	Fred Nile (Call to Australia)	Elisabeth Kirkby (Democrat)	Franca Arena (Labor/ Independent)	Bryan Vaughan (Labor)	Peter Philips (Liberal)	Ted Pickering (Liberal)	Bob Rowland Smith (NCP)	Max Willis (Liberal)	1985	1984-1988
1984–1988	1986	Mick Ibbett (Labor)	Ken Reed (Labor)	George Brenner (politician) (Labor)	Ann Symonds (Labor)	Keith Enderbury (Labor)	Frank Calabro (Liberal)	Jim Samios (Liberal)	Ron Dyer (Labor)	Marie Fisher (Labor)	Beryl Evans (Liberal/ Seniors)	Dorothy Isaksen (Labor)	Johno Johnson (Labor)	Adrian Solomons (NCP)	Norm King (Labor)	Delcia Kite (Labor)	Greg Percival (Liberal)	Toby MacDiarmid (NCP/ Independent)	Judith Walker (Labor)	John Hannaford (Liberal)	John Jobling (Liberal)	Joe Thompson (Labor)	Richard Bull (National)	Michael Egan (Labor)	Peter Watkins (Labor)	1986	1984-1988	1986	Judy Jakins (National)	Jim Kaldis (Labor)	Clive Healey (Labor)	Jack Hallam (Labor)	Deirdre Grusovin (Labor)	Barney French (Labor)	Jack Garland (Labor)	Marie Bignold (Call to Australia/ Independent)	Jack Doohan (NCP)	Richard Killen (NCP)	Virginia Chadwick (Liberal)	John Matthews (Liberal)	Fred Hankinson (Labor)	Fred Nile (Call to Australia)	Elisabeth Kirkby (Democrat)	Franca Arena (Labor/ Independent)	Bryan Vaughan (Labor)	Peter Philips (Liberal)	Ted Pickering (Liberal)	Bob Rowland Smith (NCP)	Max Willis (Liberal)	1986	1984-1988
1984–1988	1987	Mick Ibbett (Labor)	Ken Reed (Labor)	George Brenner (politician) (Labor)	Ann Symonds (Labor)	Keith Enderbury (Labor)	Frank Calabro (Liberal)	Jim Samios (Liberal)	Ron Dyer (Labor)	Marie Fisher (Labor)	Beryl Evans (Liberal/ Seniors)	Dorothy Isaksen (Labor)	Johno Johnson (Labor)	Adrian Solomons (NCP)	Norm King (Labor)	Delcia Kite (Labor)	Greg Percival (Liberal)	Toby MacDiarmid (NCP/ Independent)	Judith Walker (Labor)	John Hannaford (Liberal)	John Jobling (Liberal)	Joe Thompson (Labor)	Richard Bull (National)	Michael Egan (Labor)	Tony Kelly (Labor)	1987	1984-1988	1987	Judy Jakins (National)	Jim Kaldis (Labor)	Clive Healey (Labor)	Jack Hallam (Labor)	Deirdre Grusovin (Labor)	Barney French (Labor)	Jack Garland (Labor)	Marie Bignold (Call to Australia/ Independent)	Jack Doohan (NCP)	Richard Killen (NCP)	Virginia Chadwick (Liberal)	John Matthews (Liberal)	Fred Hankinson (Labor)	Fred Nile (Call to Australia)	Elisabeth Kirkby (Democrat)	Franca Arena (Labor/ Independent)	Bryan Vaughan (Labor)	Peter Philips (Liberal)	Ted Pickering (Liberal)	Bob Rowland Smith (NCP)	Max Willis (Liberal)	1987	1984-1988
1988–1991	1988	Mick Ibbett (Labor)	Ken Reed (Labor)	George Brenner (politician) (Labor)	Ann Symonds (Labor)	Keith Enderbury (Labor)	Brian Pezzutti (Liberal)	Jim Samios (Liberal)	Ron Dyer (Labor)	Andy Manson (Labor)	Beryl Evans (Liberal/ Seniors)	Richard Jones (Democrat/ Independent)	Johno Johnson (Labor)	Adrian Solomons (NCP)	Elaine Nile (Call to Australia)	Delcia Kite (Labor)	Helen Sham-Ho (Liberal/ Independent)	Duncan Gay (National)	Judith Walker (Labor)	John Hannaford (Liberal)	John Jobling (Liberal)	Stephen Mutch (Liberal)	Richard Bull (National)	Michael Egan (Labor)	Paul O'Grady (Labor)	1988	1988-1991	1988	Judy Jakins (National)	Jim Kaldis (Labor)	Ian Macdonald (Labor)	Jack Hallam (Labor)	Deirdre Grusovin (Labor)	Barney French (Labor)	Jack Garland (Labor)	Marie Bignold (Call to Australia/ Independent)	Jack Doohan (NCP)	Richard Killen (NCP)	Virginia Chadwick (Liberal)	John Matthews (Liberal)	Fred Hankinson (Labor)	Fred Nile (Call to Australia)	Elisabeth Kirkby (Democrat)	Franca Arena (Labor/ Independent)	Bryan Vaughan (Labor)	Marlene Goldsmith (Liberal)	Ted Pickering (Liberal)	Bob Rowland Smith (NCP)	Max Willis (Liberal)	1988	1988-1991
1988–1991	1988	Mick Ibbett (Labor)	Ken Reed (Labor)	George Brenner (politician) (Labor)	Ann Symonds (Labor)	Keith Enderbury (Labor)	Brian Pezzutti (Liberal)	Jim Samios (Liberal)	Ron Dyer (Labor)	Andy Manson (Labor)	Beryl Evans (Liberal/ Seniors)	Richard Jones (Democrat/ Independent)	Johno Johnson (Labor)	Adrian Solomons (NCP)	Elaine Nile (Call to Australia)	Delcia Kite (Labor)	Helen Sham-Ho (Liberal/ Independent)	Duncan Gay (National)	Judith Walker (Labor)	John Hannaford (Liberal)	John Jobling (Liberal)	Stephen Mutch (Liberal)	Richard Bull (National)	Michael Egan (Labor)	Paul O'Grady (Labor)	1988	1988-1991	1988	Judy Jakins (National)	Jim Kaldis (Labor)	Ian Macdonald (Labor)	Jack Hallam (Labor)	Deirdre Grusovin (Labor)	Barney French (Labor)	Jack Garland (Labor)	Marie Bignold (Call to Australia/ Independent)	Jack Doohan (NCP)	Richard Killen (NCP)	Virginia Chadwick (Liberal)	John Matthews (Liberal)	Fred Hankinson (Labor)	Fred Nile (Call to Australia)	Elisabeth Kirkby (Democrat)	Franca Arena (Labor/ Independent)	Bryan Vaughan (Labor)	Marlene Goldsmith (Liberal)	Ted Pickering (Liberal)	Bob Rowland Smith (NCP)	Max Willis (Liberal)	1988	1988-1991
1988–1991	1990	Mick Ibbett (Labor)	Ken Reed (Labor)	George Brenner (politician) (Labor)	Ann Symonds (Labor)	Keith Enderbury (Labor)	Brian Pezzutti (Liberal)	Jim Samios (Liberal)	Ron Dyer (Labor)	Andy Manson (Labor)	Beryl Evans (Liberal/ Seniors)	Richard Jones (Democrat/ Independent)	Johno Johnson (Labor)	Adrian Solomons (NCP)	Elaine Nile (Call to Australia)	Delcia Kite (Labor)	Helen Sham-Ho (Liberal/ Independent)	Duncan Gay (National)	Judith Walker (Labor)	John Hannaford (Liberal)	John Jobling (Liberal)	Stephen Mutch (Liberal)	Richard Bull (National)	Michael Egan (Labor)	Paul O'Grady (Labor)	1990	1988-1991	1990	Judy Jakins (National)	Jim Kaldis (Labor)	Ian Macdonald (Labor)	Jack Hallam (Labor)	Dorothy Isaksen (Labor)	Barney French (Labor)	Jeff Shaw (Labor)	Marie Bignold (Call to Australia/ Independent)	Jack Doohan (NCP)	Richard Killen (NCP)	Virginia Chadwick (Liberal)	John Matthews (Liberal)	Fred Hankinson (Labor)	Fred Nile (Call to Australia)	Elisabeth Kirkby (Democrat)	Franca Arena (Labor/ Independent)	Bryan Vaughan (Labor)	Marlene Goldsmith (Liberal)	Ted Pickering (Liberal)	Bob Rowland Smith (NCP)	Max Willis (Liberal)	1990	1988-1991
1991–1995	1991	42 Councillors			Ann Symonds (Labor)	Keith Enderbury (Labor)	Brian Pezzutti (Liberal)	Jim Samios (Liberal)	Ron Dyer (Labor)	Andy Manson (Labor)	Beryl Evans (Liberal/ Seniors)	Richard Jones (Democrat/ Independent)	Johno Johnson (Labor)	Adrian Solomons (NCP)	Elaine Nile (Call to Australia)	Delcia Kite (Labor)	Helen Sham-Ho (Liberal/ Independent)	Duncan Gay (National)	Judith Walker (Labor)	John Hannaford (Liberal)	John Jobling (Liberal)	Stephen Mutch (Liberal)	Richard Bull (National)	Michael Egan (Labor)	Paul O'Grady (Labor)	1991	1991-1995	1991	Robert Webster (National)	Jim Kaldis (Labor)	Ian Macdonald (Labor)	Jack Hallam (Labor)	Dorothy Isaksen (Labor)	Jan Burnswoods (Labor)	Jeff Shaw (Labor)	Meredith Burgmann (Labor)	Doug Moppett (National)	Jenny Gardiner (National)	Virginia Chadwick (Liberal)	John Ryan (Liberal)	Patricia Forsythe (Liberal)	Fred Nile (Call to Australia)	Elisabeth Kirkby (Democrat)	Franca Arena (Labor/ Independent)	Bryan Vaughan (Labor)	Marlene Goldsmith (Liberal)	Ted Pickering (Liberal)	Bob Rowland Smith (NCP)	Max Willis (Liberal)	1991	1991-1995
1991–1995	1991	42 Councillors			Ann Symonds (Labor)	Keith Enderbury (Labor)	Brian Pezzutti (Liberal)	Jim Samios (Liberal)	Ron Dyer (Labor)	Andy Manson (Labor)	Beryl Evans (Liberal/ Seniors)	Richard Jones (Democrat/ Independent)	Johno Johnson (Labor)	Lloyd Coleman (National)	Elaine Nile (Call to Australia)	Delcia Kite (Labor)	Helen Sham-Ho (Liberal/ Independent)	Duncan Gay (National)	Judith Walker (Labor)	John Hannaford (Liberal)	John Jobling (Liberal)	Stephen Mutch (Liberal)	Richard Bull (National)	Michael Egan (Labor)	Paul O'Grady (Labor)	1991	1991-1995	1991	Robert Webster (National)	Jim Kaldis (Labor)	Ian Macdonald (Labor)	Eddie Obeid (Labor)	Dorothy Isaksen (Labor)	Jan Burnswoods (Labor)	Jeff Shaw (Labor)	Meredith Burgmann (Labor)	Doug Moppett (National)	Jenny Gardiner (National)	Virginia Chadwick (Liberal)	John Ryan (Liberal)	Patricia Forsythe (Liberal)	Fred Nile (Call to Australia)	Elisabeth Kirkby (Democrat)	Franca Arena (Labor/ Independent)	Bryan Vaughan (Labor)	Marlene Goldsmith (Liberal)	Ted Pickering (Liberal)	Bob Rowland Smith (NCP)	Max Willis (Liberal)	1991	1991-1995
1991–1995	1995	42 Councillors			Ann Symonds (Labor)	Keith Enderbury (Labor)	Brian Pezzutti (Liberal)	Jim Samios (Liberal)	Ron Dyer (Labor)	Andy Manson (Labor)	Beryl Evans (Liberal/ Seniors)	Richard Jones (Democrat/ Independent)	Johno Johnson (Labor)	Lloyd Coleman (National)	Elaine Nile (Call to Australia)	Delcia Kite (Labor)	Helen Sham-Ho (Liberal/ Independent)	Duncan Gay (National)	Judith Walker (Labor)	John Hannaford (Liberal)	John Jobling (Liberal)	Stephen Mutch (Liberal)	Richard Bull (National)	Michael Egan (Labor)	Paul O'Grady (Labor)	1995	1991-1995	1995	Robert Webster (National)	Jim Kaldis (Labor)	Ian Macdonald (Labor)	Eddie Obeid (Labor)	Dorothy Isaksen (Labor)	Jan Burnswoods (Labor)	Jeff Shaw (Labor)	Meredith Burgmann (Labor)	Doug Moppett (National)	Jenny Gardiner (National)	Virginia Chadwick (Liberal)	John Ryan (Liberal)	Patricia Forsythe (Liberal)	Fred Nile (Call to Australia)	Elisabeth Kirkby (Democrat)	Franca Arena (Labor/ Independent)	Bryan Vaughan (Labor)	Marlene Goldsmith (Liberal)	Ted Pickering (Liberal)	Bob Rowland Smith (NCP)	Max Willis (Liberal)	1995	1991-1995
1995–1999	1995	42 Councillors			Ann Symonds (Labor)	Patricia Staunton (Labor)	Brian Pezzutti (Liberal)	Jim Samios (Liberal)	Ron Dyer (Labor)	Andy Manson (Labor)	Alan Corbett (ABFFOC)	Richard Jones (Democrat/ Independent)	Johno Johnson (Labor)	John Tingle (SFF)	Elaine Nile (Call to Australia)	Janelle Saffin (Labor)	Helen Sham-Ho (Liberal/ Independent)	Duncan Gay (National)	Ian Cohen (Greens)	John Hannaford (Liberal)	John Jobling (Liberal)	Stephen Mutch (Liberal)	Richard Bull (National)	Michael Egan (Labor)	Paul O'Grady (Labor)	1995	1995-1999	1995	Robert Webster (National)	Jim Kaldis (Labor)	Ian Macdonald (Labor)	Eddie Obeid (Labor)	Dorothy Isaksen (Labor)	Jan Burnswoods (Labor)	Jeff Shaw (Labor)	Meredith Burgmann (Labor)	Doug Moppett (National)	Jenny Gardiner (National)	Virginia Chadwick (Liberal)	John Ryan (Liberal)	Patricia Forsythe (Liberal)	Fred Nile (Call to Australia)	Elisabeth Kirkby (Democrat)	Franca Arena (Labor/ Independent)	Bryan Vaughan (Labor)	Marlene Goldsmith (Liberal)	Ted Pickering (Liberal)	Bob Rowland Smith (NCP)	Max Willis (Liberal)	1995	1995-1999
1995–1999	1995	42 Councillors			Ann Symonds (Labor)	Patricia Staunton (Labor)	Brian Pezzutti (Liberal)	Jim Samios (Liberal)	Ron Dyer (Labor)	Andy Manson (Labor)	Alan Corbett (ABFFOC)	Richard Jones (Democrat/ Independent)	Johno Johnson (Labor)	John Tingle (SFF)	Elaine Nile (Call to Australia)	Janelle Saffin (Labor)	Helen Sham-Ho (Liberal/ Independent)	Duncan Gay (National)	Ian Cohen (Greens)	John Hannaford (Liberal)	John Jobling (Liberal)	Stephen Mutch (Liberal)	Richard Bull (National)	Michael Egan (Labor)	Paul O'Grady (Labor)	1995	1995-1999	1995	Mark Kersten (National)	Jim Kaldis (Labor)	Ian Macdonald (Labor)	Eddie Obeid (Labor)	Dorothy Isaksen (Labor)	Jan Burnswoods (Labor)	Jeff Shaw (Labor)	Meredith Burgmann (Labor)	Doug Moppett (National)	Jenny Gardiner (National)	Virginia Chadwick (Liberal)	John Ryan (Liberal)	Patricia Forsythe (Liberal)	Fred Nile (Call to Australia)	Elisabeth Kirkby (Democrat)	Franca Arena (Labor/ Independent)	Bryan Vaughan (Labor)	Marlene Goldsmith (Liberal)	Charlie Lynn (Liberal)	Bob Rowland Smith (NCP)	Max Willis (Liberal)	1995	1995-1999
1995–1999	1996	42 Councillors			Ann Symonds (Labor)	Patricia Staunton (Labor)	Brian Pezzutti (Liberal)	Jim Samios (Liberal)	Ron Dyer (Labor)	Andy Manson (Labor)	Alan Corbett (ABFFOC)	Richard Jones (Democrat/ Independent)	Johno Johnson (Labor)	John Tingle (SFF)	Elaine Nile (Call to Australia)	Janelle Saffin (Labor)	Helen Sham-Ho (Liberal/ Independent)	Duncan Gay (National)	Ian Cohen (Greens)	John Hannaford (Liberal)	John Jobling (Liberal)	Mike Gallacher (Liberal/ Independent)	Richard Bull (National)	Michael Egan (Labor)	Peter Primrose (Labor)	1996	1995-1999	1996	Mark Kersten (National)	Jim Kaldis (Labor)	Ian Macdonald (Labor)	Eddie Obeid (Labor)	Dorothy Isaksen (Labor)	Jan Burnswoods (Labor)	Jeff Shaw (Labor)	Meredith Burgmann (Labor)	Doug Moppett (National)	Jenny Gardiner (National)	Virginia Chadwick (Liberal)	John Ryan (Liberal)	Patricia Forsythe (Liberal)	Fred Nile (Call to Australia)	Elisabeth Kirkby (Democrat)	Franca Arena (Labor/ Independent)	Bryan Vaughan (Labor)	Marlene Goldsmith (Liberal)	Charlie Lynn (Liberal)	Bob Rowland Smith (NCP)	Max Willis (Liberal)	1996	1995-1999
1995–1999	1997	42 Councillors			Ann Symonds (Labor)	Tony Kelly (Labor)	Brian Pezzutti (Liberal)	Jim Samios (Liberal)	Ron Dyer (Labor)	Andy Manson (Labor)	Alan Corbett (ABFFOC)	Richard Jones (Democrat/ Independent)	Johno Johnson (Labor)	John Tingle (SFF)	Elaine Nile (Call to Australia)	Janelle Saffin (Labor)	Helen Sham-Ho (Liberal/ Independent)	Duncan Gay (National)	Ian Cohen (Greens)	John Hannaford (Liberal)	John Jobling (Liberal)	Mike Gallacher (Liberal/ Independent)	Richard Bull (National)	Michael Egan (Labor)	Peter Primrose (Labor)	1997	1995-1999	1997	Mark Kersten (National)	Jim Kaldis (Labor)	Ian Macdonald (Labor)	Eddie Obeid (Labor)	Dorothy Isaksen (Labor)	Jan Burnswoods (Labor)	Jeff Shaw (Labor)	Meredith Burgmann (Labor)	Doug Moppett (National)	Jenny Gardiner (National)	Virginia Chadwick (Liberal)	John Ryan (Liberal)	Patricia Forsythe (Liberal)	Fred Nile (Call to Australia)	Elisabeth Kirkby (Democrat)	Franca Arena (Labor/ Independent)	Bryan Vaughan (Labor)	Marlene Goldsmith (Liberal)	Charlie Lynn (Liberal)	Bob Rowland Smith (NCP)	Max Willis (Liberal)	1997	1995-1999
1995–1999	1998	42 Councillors			Carmel Tebbutt (Labor)	Tony Kelly (Labor)	Brian Pezzutti (Liberal)	Jim Samios (Liberal)	Ron Dyer (Labor)	Andy Manson (Labor)	Alan Corbett (ABFFOC)	Richard Jones (Democrat/ Independent)	Johno Johnson (Labor)	John Tingle (SFF)	Elaine Nile (Call to Australia)	Janelle Saffin (Labor)	Helen Sham-Ho (Liberal/ Independent)	Duncan Gay (National)	Ian Cohen (Greens)	John Hannaford (Liberal)	John Jobling (Liberal)	Mike Gallacher (Liberal/ Independent)	Richard Bull (National)	Michael Egan (Labor)	Peter Primrose (Labor)	1998	1995-1999	1998	Mark Kersten (National)	Jim Kaldis (Labor)	Ian Macdonald (Labor)	Eddie Obeid (Labor)	Dorothy Isaksen (Labor)	Jan Burnswoods (Labor)	Jeff Shaw (Labor)	Meredith Burgmann (Labor)	Doug Moppett (National)	Jenny Gardiner (National)	Virginia Chadwick (Liberal)	John Ryan (Liberal)	Patricia Forsythe (Liberal)	Fred Nile (Call to Australia)	Arthur Chesterfield-Evans (Democrat)	Franca Arena (Labor/ Independent)	Bryan Vaughan (Labor)	Marlene Goldsmith (Liberal)	Charlie Lynn (Liberal)	Bob Rowland Smith (NCP)	Max Willis (Liberal)	1998	1995-1999
1999–2003	1999	42 Councillors			Carmel Tebbutt (Labor)	Tony Kelly (Labor)	Brian Pezzutti (Liberal)	Jim Samios (Liberal)	Ron Dyer (Labor)	Andy Manson (Labor)	Alan Corbett (ABFFOC)	Richard Jones (Democrat/ Independent)	Johno Johnson (Labor)	John Tingle (SFF)	Elaine Nile (Call to Australia)	Janelle Saffin (Labor)	Helen Sham-Ho (Liberal/ Independent)	Duncan Gay (National)	Ian Cohen (Greens)	John Hannaford (Liberal)	John Jobling (Liberal)	Mike Gallacher (Liberal/ Independent)	Richard Bull (National)	Michael Egan (Labor)	Peter Primrose (Labor)	1999	1999–2003	1999	David Oldfield (One Nation/ Independent/ One Nation NSW/ Independent)	John Hatzistergos (Labor)	Ian Macdonald (Labor)	Eddie Obeid (Labor)	Lee Rhiannon (Greens)	Jan Burnswoods (Labor)	Jeff Shaw (Labor)	Meredith Burgmann (Labor)	Doug Moppett (National)	Jenny Gardiner (National)	Don Harwin (Liberal)	John Ryan (Liberal)	Patricia Forsythe (Liberal)	Fred Nile (Call to Australia)	Arthur Chesterfield-Evans (Democrat)	John Della Bosca (Labor)	Henry Tsang (Labor)	Peter Wong (Unity)	Charlie Lynn (Liberal)	Peter Breen (Legal Reform/ Labor/ Human Rights)	Malcolm Jones (Outdoor Recreation)	1999	1999–2003
1999–2003	2000	42 Councillors			Carmel Tebbutt (Labor)	Tony Kelly (Labor)	Brian Pezzutti (Liberal)	Jim Samios (Liberal)	Ron Dyer (Labor)	Ian West (Labor)	Alan Corbett (ABFFOC)	Richard Jones (Democrat/ Independent)	Johno Johnson (Labor)	John Tingle (SFF)	Elaine Nile (Call to Australia)	Janelle Saffin (Labor)	Helen Sham-Ho (Liberal/ Independent)	Duncan Gay (National)	Ian Cohen (Greens)	Greg Pearce (Liberal)	John Jobling (Liberal)	Mike Gallacher (Liberal/ Independent)	Rick Colless (National)	Michael Egan (Labor)	Peter Primrose (Labor)	2000	1999–2003	2000	David Oldfield (One Nation/ Independent/ One Nation NSW/ Independent)	John Hatzistergos (Labor)	Ian Macdonald (Labor)	Eddie Obeid (Labor)	Lee Rhiannon (Greens)	Jan Burnswoods (Labor)	Amanda Fazio (Labor)	Meredith Burgmann (Labor)	Doug Moppett (National)	Jenny Gardiner (National)	Don Harwin (Liberal)	John Ryan (Liberal)	Patricia Forsythe (Liberal)	Fred Nile (Call to Australia)	Arthur Chesterfield-Evans (Democrat)	John Della Bosca (Labor)	Henry Tsang (Labor)	Peter Wong (Unity)	Charlie Lynn (Liberal)	Peter Breen (Legal Reform/ Labor/ Human Rights)	Malcolm Jones (Outdoor Recreation)	2000	1999–2003
1999–2003	2001	42 Councillors			Carmel Tebbutt (Labor)	Tony Kelly (Labor)	Brian Pezzutti (Liberal)	Jim Samios (Liberal)	Ron Dyer (Labor)	Ian West (Labor)	Alan Corbett (ABFFOC)	Richard Jones (Democrat/ Independent)	Michael Costa (Labor)	John Tingle (SFF)	Elaine Nile (Call to Australia)	Janelle Saffin (Labor)	Helen Sham-Ho (Liberal/ Independent)	Duncan Gay (National)	Ian Cohen (Greens)	Greg Pearce (Liberal)	John Jobling (Liberal)	Mike Gallacher (Liberal/ Independent)	Rick Colless (National)	Michael Egan (Labor)	Peter Primrose (Labor)	2001	1999–2003	2001	David Oldfield (One Nation/ Independent/ One Nation NSW/ Independent)	John Hatzistergos (Labor)	Ian Macdonald (Labor)	Eddie Obeid (Labor)	Lee Rhiannon (Greens)	Jan Burnswoods (Labor)	Amanda Fazio (Labor)	Meredith Burgmann (Labor)	Doug Moppett (National)	Jenny Gardiner (National)	Don Harwin (Liberal)	John Ryan (Liberal)	Patricia Forsythe (Liberal)	Fred Nile (Call to Australia)	Arthur Chesterfield-Evans (Democrat)	John Della Bosca (Labor)	Henry Tsang (Labor)	Peter Wong (Unity)	Charlie Lynn (Liberal)	Peter Breen (Legal Reform/ Labor/ Human Rights)	Malcolm Jones (Outdoor Recreation)	2001	1999–2003
1999–2003	2002	42 Councillors			Carmel Tebbutt (Labor)	Tony Kelly (Labor)	Brian Pezzutti (Liberal)	Jim Samios (Liberal)	Ron Dyer (Labor)	Ian West (Labor)	Alan Corbett (ABFFOC)	Richard Jones (Democrat/ Independent)	Michael Costa (Labor)	John Tingle (SFF)	Gordon Moyes (Christian Democrats/ Independent/ Family First)	Janelle Saffin (Labor)	Helen Sham-Ho (Liberal/ Independent)	Duncan Gay (National)	Ian Cohen (Greens)	Greg Pearce (Liberal)	John Jobling (Liberal)	Mike Gallacher (Liberal/ Independent)	Rick Colless (National)	Michael Egan (Labor)	Peter Primrose (Labor)	2002	1999–2003	2002	David Oldfield (One Nation/ Independent/ One Nation NSW/ Independent)	John Hatzistergos (Labor)	Ian Macdonald (Labor)	Eddie Obeid (Labor)	Lee Rhiannon (Greens)	Jan Burnswoods (Labor)	Amanda Fazio (Labor)	Meredith Burgmann (Labor)	Melinda Pavey (National)	Jenny Gardiner (National)	Don Harwin (Liberal)	John Ryan (Liberal)	Patricia Forsythe (Liberal)	Fred Nile (Call to Australia)	Arthur Chesterfield-Evans (Democrat)	John Della Bosca (Labor)	Henry Tsang (Labor)	Peter Wong (Unity)	Charlie Lynn (Liberal)	Peter Breen (Legal Reform/ Labor/ Human Rights)	Malcolm Jones (Outdoor Recreation)	2002	1999–2003
2003–2007	2003	42 Councillors			Carmel Tebbutt (Labor)	Tony Kelly (Labor)	Catherine Cusack (Liberal)	David Clarke (Liberal)	Tony Catanzariti (Labor)	Ian West (Labor)	Sylvia Hale (Greens)	Kayee Griffin (Labor)	Michael Costa (Labor)	John Tingle (SFF)	Gordon Moyes (Christian Democrats/ Independent/ Family First)	Christine Robertson (Labor)	Tony Burke (Labor)	Duncan Gay (National)	Ian Cohen (Greens)	Greg Pearce (Liberal)	Robyn Parker (Liberal)	Mike Gallacher (Liberal/ Independent)	Rick Colless (National)	Michael Egan (Labor)	Peter Primrose (Labor)	2003	2003–2007	2003	David Oldfield (One Nation/ Independent/ One Nation NSW/ Independent)	John Hatzistergos (Labor)	Ian Macdonald (Labor)	Eddie Obeid (Labor)	Lee Rhiannon (Greens)	Jan Burnswoods (Labor)	Amanda Fazio (Labor)	Meredith Burgmann (Labor)	Melinda Pavey (National)	Jenny Gardiner (National)	Don Harwin (Liberal)	John Ryan (Liberal)	Patricia Forsythe (Liberal)	Fred Nile (Call to Australia)	Arthur Chesterfield-Evans (Democrat)	John Della Bosca (Labor)	Henry Tsang (Labor)	Peter Wong (Unity)	Charlie Lynn (Liberal)	Peter Breen (Legal Reform/ Labor/ Human Rights)	Malcolm Jones (Outdoor Recreation)	2003	2003–2007
2003–2007	2003	42 Councillors			Carmel Tebbutt (Labor)	Tony Kelly (Labor)	Catherine Cusack (Liberal)	David Clarke (Liberal)	Tony Catanzariti (Labor)	Ian West (Labor)	Sylvia Hale (Greens)	Kayee Griffin (Labor)	Michael Costa (Labor)	John Tingle (SFF)	Gordon Moyes (Christian Democrats/ Independent/ Family First)	Christine Robertson (Labor)	Tony Burke (Labor)	Duncan Gay (National)	Ian Cohen (Greens)	Greg Pearce (Liberal)	Robyn Parker (Liberal)	Mike Gallacher (Liberal/ Independent)	Rick Colless (National)	Michael Egan (Labor)	Peter Primrose (Labor)	2003	2003–2007	2003	David Oldfield (One Nation/ Independent/ One Nation NSW/ Independent)	John Hatzistergos (Labor)	Ian Macdonald (Labor)	Eddie Obeid (Labor)	Lee Rhiannon (Greens)	Jan Burnswoods (Labor)	Amanda Fazio (Labor)	Meredith Burgmann (Labor)	Melinda Pavey (National)	Jenny Gardiner (National)	Don Harwin (Liberal)	John Ryan (Liberal)	Patricia Forsythe (Liberal)	Fred Nile (Call to Australia)	Arthur Chesterfield-Evans (Democrat)	John Della Bosca (Labor)	Henry Tsang (Labor)	Peter Wong (Unity)	Charlie Lynn (Liberal)	Peter Breen (Legal Reform/ Labor/ Human Rights)	Jon Jenkins (Outdoor Recreation)	2003	2003–2007
2003–2007	Q2 2004	42 Councillors			Carmel Tebbutt (Labor)	Tony Kelly (Labor)	Catherine Cusack (Liberal)	David Clarke (Liberal)	Tony Catanzariti (Labor)	Ian West (Labor)	Sylvia Hale (Greens)	Kayee Griffin (Labor)	Michael Costa (Labor)	John Tingle (SFF)	Gordon Moyes (Christian Democrats/ Independent/ Family First)	Christine Robertson (Labor)	Eric Roozendaal (Labor/ Independent)	Duncan Gay (National)	Ian Cohen (Greens)	Greg Pearce (Liberal)	Robyn Parker (Liberal)	Mike Gallacher (Liberal/ Independent)	Rick Colless (National)	Michael Egan (Labor)	Peter Primrose (Labor)	Q2 2004	2003–2007	Q2 2004	David Oldfield (One Nation/ Independent/ One Nation NSW/ Independent)	John Hatzistergos (Labor)	Ian Macdonald (Labor)	Eddie Obeid (Labor)	Lee Rhiannon (Greens)	Jan Burnswoods (Labor)	Amanda Fazio (Labor)	Meredith Burgmann (Labor)	Melinda Pavey (National)	Jenny Gardiner (National)	Don Harwin (Liberal)	John Ryan (Liberal)	Patricia Forsythe (Liberal)	Fred Nile (Call to Australia)	Arthur Chesterfield-Evans (Democrat)	John Della Bosca (Labor)	Henry Tsang (Labor)	Peter Wong (Unity)	Charlie Lynn (Liberal)	Peter Breen (Legal Reform/ Labor/ Human Rights)	Jon Jenkins (Outdoor Recreation)	Q2 2004	2003–2007
2003–2007	Q3 2004	42 Councillors			Carmel Tebbutt (Labor)	Tony Kelly (Labor)	Catherine Cusack (Liberal)	David Clarke (Liberal)	Tony Catanzariti (Labor)	Ian West (Labor)	Sylvia Hale (Greens)	Kayee Griffin (Labor)	Michael Costa (Labor)	John Tingle (SFF)	Gordon Moyes (Christian Democrats/ Independent/ Family First)	Christine Robertson (Labor)	Eric Roozendaal (Labor/ Independent)	Duncan Gay (National)	Ian Cohen (Greens)	Greg Pearce (Liberal)	Robyn Parker (Liberal)	Mike Gallacher (Liberal/ Independent)	Rick Colless (National)	Michael Egan (Labor)	Peter Primrose (Labor)	Q3 2004	2003–2007	Q3 2004	David Oldfield (One Nation/ Independent/ One Nation NSW/ Independent)	John Hatzistergos (Labor)	Ian Macdonald (Labor)	Eddie Obeid (Labor)	Lee Rhiannon (Greens)	Jan Burnswoods (Labor)	Amanda Fazio (Labor)	Meredith Burgmann (Labor)	Melinda Pavey (National)	Jenny Gardiner (National)	Don Harwin (Liberal)	John Ryan (Liberal)	Patricia Forsythe (Liberal)	Vacant	Arthur Chesterfield-Evans (Democrat)	John Della Bosca (Labor)	Henry Tsang (Labor)	Peter Wong (Unity)	Charlie Lynn (Liberal)	Peter Breen (Legal Reform/ Labor/ Human Rights)	Jon Jenkins (Outdoor Recreation)	Q3 2004	2003–2007
2003–2007	Q4 2004	42 Councillors			Carmel Tebbutt (Labor)	Tony Kelly (Labor)	Catherine Cusack (Liberal)	David Clarke (Liberal)	Tony Catanzariti (Labor)	Ian West (Labor)	Sylvia Hale (Greens)	Kayee Griffin (Labor)	Michael Costa (Labor)	John Tingle (SFF)	Gordon Moyes (Christian Democrats/ Independent/ Family First)	Christine Robertson (Labor)	Eric Roozendaal (Labor/ Independent)	Duncan Gay (National)	Ian Cohen (Greens)	Greg Pearce (Liberal)	Robyn Parker (Liberal)	Mike Gallacher (Liberal/ Independent)	Rick Colless (National)	Michael Egan (Labor)	Peter Primrose (Labor)	Q4 2004	2003–2007	Q4 2004	David Oldfield (One Nation/ Independent/ One Nation NSW/ Independent)	John Hatzistergos (Labor)	Ian Macdonald (Labor)	Eddie Obeid (Labor)	Lee Rhiannon (Greens)	Jan Burnswoods (Labor)	Amanda Fazio (Labor)	Meredith Burgmann (Labor)	Melinda Pavey (National)	Jenny Gardiner (National)	Don Harwin (Liberal)	John Ryan (Liberal)	Patricia Forsythe (Liberal)	Fred Nile (Christian Democrats/ Independent)	Arthur Chesterfield-Evans (Democrat)	John Della Bosca (Labor)	Henry Tsang (Labor)	Peter Wong (Unity)	Charlie Lynn (Liberal)	Peter Breen (Legal Reform/ Labor/ Human Rights)	Jon Jenkins (Outdoor Recreation)	Q4 2004	2003–2007
2003–2007	2005	42 Councillors			Penny Sharpe (Labor)	Tony Kelly (Labor)	Catherine Cusack (Liberal)	David Clarke (Liberal)	Tony Catanzariti (Labor)	Ian West (Labor)	Sylvia Hale (Greens)	Kayee Griffin (Labor)	Michael Costa (Labor)	John Tingle (SFF)	Gordon Moyes (Christian Democrats/ Independent/ Family First)	Christine Robertson (Labor)	Eric Roozendaal (Labor/ Independent)	Duncan Gay (National)	Ian Cohen (Greens)	Greg Pearce (Liberal)	Robyn Parker (Liberal)	Mike Gallacher (Liberal/ Independent)	Rick Colless (National)	Greg Donnelly (Labor)	Peter Primrose (Labor)	2005	2003–2007	2005	David Oldfield (One Nation/ Independent/ One Nation NSW/ Independent)	John Hatzistergos (Labor)	Ian Macdonald (Labor)	Eddie Obeid (Labor)	Lee Rhiannon (Greens)	Jan Burnswoods (Labor)	Amanda Fazio (Labor)	Meredith Burgmann (Labor)	Melinda Pavey (National)	Jenny Gardiner (National)	Don Harwin (Liberal)	John Ryan (Liberal)	Patricia Forsythe (Liberal)	Fred Nile (Christian Democrats/ Independent)	Arthur Chesterfield-Evans (Democrat)	John Della Bosca (Labor)	Henry Tsang (Labor)	Peter Wong (Unity)	Charlie Lynn (Liberal)	Peter Breen (Legal Reform/ Labor/ Human Rights)	Jon Jenkins (Outdoor Recreation)	2005	2003–2007
2003–2007	Q2 2006	42 Councillors			Penny Sharpe (Labor)	Tony Kelly (Labor)	Catherine Cusack (Liberal)	David Clarke (Liberal)	Tony Catanzariti (Labor)	Ian West (Labor)	Sylvia Hale (Greens)	Kayee Griffin (Labor)	Michael Costa (Labor)	Robert Brown (SFF)	Gordon Moyes (Christian Democrats/ Independent/ Family First)	Christine Robertson (Labor)	Eric Roozendaal (Labor/ Independent)	Duncan Gay (National)	Ian Cohen (Greens)	Greg Pearce (Liberal)	Robyn Parker (Liberal)	Mike Gallacher (Liberal/ Independent)	Rick Colless (National)	Greg Donnelly (Labor)	Peter Primrose (Labor)	Q2 2006	2003–2007	Q2 2006	David Oldfield (One Nation/ Independent/ One Nation NSW/ Independent)	John Hatzistergos (Labor)	Ian Macdonald (Labor)	Eddie Obeid (Labor)	Lee Rhiannon (Greens)	Jan Burnswoods (Labor)	Amanda Fazio (Labor)	Meredith Burgmann (Labor)	Melinda Pavey (National)	Jenny Gardiner (National)	Don Harwin (Liberal)	John Ryan (Liberal)	Patricia Forsythe (Liberal)	Fred Nile (Christian Democrats/ Independent)	Arthur Chesterfield-Evans (Democrat)	John Della Bosca (Labor)	Henry Tsang (Labor)	Peter Wong (Unity)	Charlie Lynn (Liberal)	Peter Breen (Legal Reform/ Labor/ Human Rights)	Jon Jenkins (Outdoor Recreation)	Q2 2006	2003–2007
2003–2007	Q3 2006	42 Councillors			Penny Sharpe (Labor)	Tony Kelly (Labor)	Catherine Cusack (Liberal)	David Clarke (Liberal)	Tony Catanzariti (Labor)	Ian West (Labor)	Sylvia Hale (Greens)	Kayee Griffin (Labor)	Michael Costa (Labor)	Robert Brown (SFF)	Gordon Moyes (Christian Democrats/ Independent/ Family First)	Christine Robertson (Labor)	Eric Roozendaal (Labor/ Independent)	Duncan Gay (National)	Ian Cohen (Greens)	Greg Pearce (Liberal)	Robyn Parker (Liberal)	Mike Gallacher (Liberal/ Independent)	Rick Colless (National)	Greg Donnelly (Labor)	Peter Primrose (Labor)	Q3 2006	2003–2007	Q3 2006	David Oldfield (One Nation/ Independent/ One Nation NSW/ Independent)	John Hatzistergos (Labor)	Ian Macdonald (Labor)	Eddie Obeid (Labor)	Lee Rhiannon (Greens)	Jan Burnswoods (Labor)	Amanda Fazio (Labor)	Meredith Burgmann (Labor)	Melinda Pavey (National)	Jenny Gardiner (National)	Don Harwin (Liberal)	John Ryan (Liberal)	Matthew Mason-Cox (Liberal/ Independent/ Liberal)	Fred Nile (Christian Democrats/ Independent)	Arthur Chesterfield-Evans (Democrat)	John Della Bosca (Labor)	Henry Tsang (Labor)	Peter Wong (Unity)	Charlie Lynn (Liberal)	Peter Breen (Legal Reform/ Labor/ Human Rights)	Jon Jenkins (Outdoor Recreation)	Q3 2006	2003–2007
2007–2011	2007	42 Councillors			Penny Sharpe (Labor)	Tony Kelly (Labor)	Catherine Cusack (Liberal)	David Clarke (Liberal)	Tony Catanzariti (Labor)	Ian West (Labor)	Sylvia Hale (Greens)	Kayee Griffin (Labor)	Michael Costa (Labor)	Robert Brown (SFF)	Gordon Moyes (Christian Democrats/ Independent/ Family First)	Christine Robertson (Labor)	Eric Roozendaal (Labor/ Independent)	Duncan Gay (National)	Ian Cohen (Greens)	Greg Pearce (Liberal)	Robyn Parker (Liberal)	Mike Gallacher (Liberal/ Independent)	Rick Colless (National)	Greg Donnelly (Labor)	Peter Primrose (Labor)	2007	2007–2011	2007	Roy Smith (SFF)	John Hatzistergos (Labor)	Ian Macdonald (Labor)	Eddie Obeid (Labor)	Lee Rhiannon (Greens)	Lynda Voltz (Labor)	Amanda Fazio (Labor)	Mick Veitch (Labor)	Melinda Pavey (National)	Jenny Gardiner (National)	Don Harwin (Liberal)	John Ajaka (Liberal)	Matthew Mason-Cox (Liberal/ Independent/ Liberal)	Fred Nile (Christian Democrats/ Independent)	John Kaye (Greens)	John Della Bosca (Labor)	Henry Tsang (Labor)	Marie Ficarra (Liberal/ Independent)	Charlie Lynn (Liberal)	Trevor Khan (National)	Helen Westwood (Labor)	2007	2007–2011
2007–2011	2008	42 Councillors			Penny Sharpe (Labor)	Tony Kelly (Labor)	Catherine Cusack (Liberal)	David Clarke (Liberal)	Tony Catanzariti (Labor)	Ian West (Labor)	Sylvia Hale (Greens)	Kayee Griffin (Labor)	John Robertson (Labor)	Robert Brown (SFF)	Gordon Moyes (Christian Democrats/ Independent/ Family First)	Christine Robertson (Labor)	Eric Roozendaal (Labor/ Independent)	Duncan Gay (National)	Ian Cohen (Greens)	Greg Pearce (Liberal)	Robyn Parker (Liberal)	Mike Gallacher (Liberal/ Independent)	Rick Colless (National)	Greg Donnelly (Labor)	Peter Primrose (Labor)	2008	2007–2011	2008	Roy Smith (SFF)	John Hatzistergos (Labor)	Ian Macdonald (Labor)	Eddie Obeid (Labor)	Lee Rhiannon (Greens)	Lynda Voltz (Labor)	Amanda Fazio (Labor)	Mick Veitch (Labor)	Melinda Pavey (National)	Jenny Gardiner (National)	Don Harwin (Liberal)	John Ajaka (Liberal)	Matthew Mason-Cox (Liberal/ Independent/ Liberal)	Fred Nile (Christian Democrats/ Independent)	John Kaye (Greens)	John Della Bosca (Labor)	Henry Tsang (Labor)	Marie Ficarra (Liberal/ Independent)	Charlie Lynn (Liberal)	Trevor Khan (National)	Helen Westwood (Labor)	2008	2007–2011
2007–2011	Q2 2009	42 Councillors			Penny Sharpe (Labor)	Tony Kelly (Labor)	Catherine Cusack (Liberal)	David Clarke (Liberal)	Tony Catanzariti (Labor)	Ian West (Labor)	Sylvia Hale (Greens)	Kayee Griffin (Labor)	John Robertson (Labor)	Robert Brown (SFF)	Gordon Moyes (Christian Democrats/ Independent/ Family First)	Christine Robertson (Labor)	Eric Roozendaal (Labor/ Independent)	Duncan Gay (National)	Ian Cohen (Greens)	Greg Pearce (Liberal)	Robyn Parker (Liberal)	Mike Gallacher (Liberal/ Independent)	Rick Colless (National)	Greg Donnelly (Labor)	Peter Primrose (Labor)	Q2 2009	2007–2011	Q2 2009	Roy Smith (SFF)	John Hatzistergos (Labor)	Ian Macdonald (Labor)	Eddie Obeid (Labor)	Lee Rhiannon (Greens)	Lynda Voltz (Labor)	Amanda Fazio (Labor)	Mick Veitch (Labor)	Melinda Pavey (National)	Jenny Gardiner (National)	Don Harwin (Liberal)	John Ajaka (Liberal)	Matthew Mason-Cox (Liberal/ Independent/ Liberal)	Fred Nile (Christian Democrats/ Independent)	John Kaye (Greens)	John Della Bosca (Labor)	Henry Tsang (Labor)	Marie Ficarra (Liberal/ Independent)	Charlie Lynn (Liberal)	Trevor Khan (National)	Helen Westwood (Labor)	Q2 2009	2007–2011
2007–2011	Q4 2009	42 Councillors			Penny Sharpe (Labor)	Tony Kelly (Labor)	Catherine Cusack (Liberal)	David Clarke (Liberal)	Tony Catanzariti (Labor)	Ian West (Labor)	Sylvia Hale (Greens)	Kayee Griffin (Labor)	John Robertson (Labor)	Robert Brown (SFF)	Gordon Moyes (Christian Democrats/ Independent/ Family First)	Christine Robertson (Labor)	Eric Roozendaal (Labor/ Independent)	Duncan Gay (National)	Ian Cohen (Greens)	Greg Pearce (Liberal)	Robyn Parker (Liberal)	Mike Gallacher (Liberal/ Independent)	Rick Colless (National)	Greg Donnelly (Labor)	Peter Primrose (Labor)	Q4 2009	2007–2011	Q4 2009	Roy Smith (SFF)	John Hatzistergos (Labor)	Ian Macdonald (Labor)	Eddie Obeid (Labor)	Lee Rhiannon (Greens)	Lynda Voltz (Labor)	Amanda Fazio (Labor)	Mick Veitch (Labor)	Melinda Pavey (National)	Jenny Gardiner (National)	Don Harwin (Liberal)	John Ajaka (Liberal)	Matthew Mason-Cox (Liberal/ Independent/ Liberal)	Fred Nile (Christian Democrats/ Independent)	John Kaye (Greens)	John Della Bosca (Labor)	Shaoquett Moselmane (Labor)	Marie Ficarra (Liberal/ Independent)	Charlie Lynn (Liberal)	Trevor Khan (National)	Helen Westwood (Labor)	Q4 2009	2007–2011
2007–2011	2010	42 Councillors			Penny Sharpe (Labor)	Tony Kelly (Labor)	Catherine Cusack (Liberal)	David Clarke (Liberal)	Tony Catanzariti (Labor)	Ian West (Labor)	David Shoebridge (Greens)	Kayee Griffin (Labor)	John Robertson (Labor)	Robert Brown (SFF)	Gordon Moyes (Christian Democrats/ Independent/ Family First)	Christine Robertson (Labor)	Eric Roozendaal (Labor/ Independent)	Duncan Gay (National)	Ian Cohen (Greens)	Greg Pearce (Liberal)	Robyn Parker (Liberal)	Mike Gallacher (Liberal/ Independent)	Rick Colless (National)	Greg Donnelly (Labor)	Peter Primrose (Labor)	2010	2007–2011	2010	Robert Borsak (SFF)	John Hatzistergos (Labor)	Luke Foley (Labor)	Eddie Obeid (Labor)	Cate Faehrmann (Greens)	Lynda Voltz (Labor)	Amanda Fazio (Labor)	Mick Veitch (Labor)	Melinda Pavey (National)	Jenny Gardiner (National)	Don Harwin (Liberal)	John Ajaka (Liberal)	Matthew Mason-Cox (Liberal/ Independent/ Liberal)	Fred Nile (Christian Democrats/ Independent)	John Kaye (Greens)	Sophie Cotsis (Labor)	Shaoquett Moselmane (Labor)	Marie Ficarra (Liberal/ Independent)	Charlie Lynn (Liberal)	Trevor Khan (National)	Helen Westwood (Labor)	2010	2007–2011
2011–2015	2011	42 Councillors			Penny Sharpe (Labor)	Tony Kelly (Labor)	Catherine Cusack (Liberal)	David Clarke (Liberal)	Natasha Maclaren-Jones (Liberal)	Sarah Mitchell (National)	David Shoebridge (Greens)	Niall Blair (National)	Jeremy Buckingham (Greens/ Independent)	Robert Brown (SFF)	Paul Green (Christian Democrats	Scot MacDonald (Liberal)	Eric Roozendaal (Labor/ Independent)	Duncan Gay (National)	Jan Barham (Greens)	Greg Pearce (Liberal)	Peter Phelps (Liberal)	Mike Gallacher (Liberal/ Independent)	Rick Colless (National)	Greg Donnelly (Labor)	Peter Primrose (Labor)	2011	2011–2015	2011	Robert Borsak (SFF)	John Hatzistergos (Labor)	Luke Foley (Labor)	Eddie Obeid (Labor)	Cate Faehrmann (Greens)	Lynda Voltz (Labor)	Amanda Fazio (Labor)	Mick Veitch (Labor)	Melinda Pavey (National)	Jenny Gardiner (National)	Don Harwin (Liberal)	John Ajaka (Liberal)	Matthew Mason-Cox (Liberal/ Independent/ Liberal)	Fred Nile (Christian Democrats/ Independent)	John Kaye (Greens)	Sophie Cotsis (Labor)	Shaoquett Moselmane (Labor)	Marie Ficarra (Liberal/ Independent)	Charlie Lynn (Liberal)	Trevor Khan (National)	Helen Westwood (Labor)	2011	2011–2015
2011–2015	2011	42 Councillors			Penny Sharpe (Labor)	Steve Whan (Labor)	Catherine Cusack (Liberal)	David Clarke (Liberal)	Natasha Maclaren-Jones (Liberal)	Sarah Mitchell (National)	David Shoebridge (Greens)	Niall Blair (National)	Jeremy Buckingham (Greens/ Independent)	Robert Brown (SFF)	Paul Green (Christian Democrats	Scot MacDonald (Liberal)	Eric Roozendaal (Labor/ Independent)	Duncan Gay (National)	Jan Barham (Greens)	Greg Pearce (Liberal)	Peter Phelps (Liberal)	Mike Gallacher (Liberal/ Independent)	Rick Colless (National)	Greg Donnelly (Labor)	Peter Primrose (Labor)	2011	2011–2015	2011	Robert Borsak (SFF)	Adam Searle (Labor)	Luke Foley (Labor)	Walt Secord (Labor)	Cate Faehrmann (Greens)	Lynda Voltz (Labor)	Amanda Fazio (Labor)	Mick Veitch (Labor)	Melinda Pavey (National)	Jenny Gardiner (National)	Don Harwin (Liberal)	John Ajaka (Liberal)	Matthew Mason-Cox (Liberal/ Independent/ Liberal)	Fred Nile (Christian Democrats/ Independent)	John Kaye (Greens)	Sophie Cotsis (Labor)	Shaoquett Moselmane (Labor)	Marie Ficarra (Liberal/ Independent)	Charlie Lynn (Liberal)	Trevor Khan (National)	Helen Westwood (Labor)	2011	2011–2015
2011–2015	2012	42 Councillors			Penny Sharpe (Labor)	Steve Whan (Labor)	Catherine Cusack (Liberal)	David Clarke (Liberal)	Natasha Maclaren-Jones (Liberal)	Sarah Mitchell (National)	David Shoebridge (Greens)	Niall Blair (National)	Jeremy Buckingham (Greens/ Independent)	Robert Brown (SFF)	Paul Green (Christian Democrats	Scot MacDonald (Liberal)	Eric Roozendaal (Labor/ Independent)	Duncan Gay (National)	Jan Barham (Greens)	Greg Pearce (Liberal)	Peter Phelps (Liberal)	Mike Gallacher (Liberal/ Independent)	Rick Colless (National)	Greg Donnelly (Labor)	Peter Primrose (Labor)	2012	2011–2015	2012	Robert Borsak (SFF)	Adam Searle (Labor)	Luke Foley (Labor)	Walt Secord (Labor)	Cate Faehrmann (Greens)	Lynda Voltz (Labor)	Amanda Fazio (Labor)	Mick Veitch (Labor)	Melinda Pavey (National)	Jenny Gardiner (National)	Don Harwin (Liberal)	John Ajaka (Liberal)	Matthew Mason-Cox (Liberal/ Independent/ Liberal)	Fred Nile (Christian Democrats/ Independent)	John Kaye (Greens)	Sophie Cotsis (Labor)	Shaoquett Moselmane (Labor)	Marie Ficarra (Liberal/ Independent)	Charlie Lynn (Liberal)	Trevor Khan (National)	Helen Westwood (Labor)	2012	2011–2015
2011–2015	2013	42 Councillors			Penny Sharpe (Labor)	Steve Whan (Labor)	Catherine Cusack (Liberal)	David Clarke (Liberal)	Natasha Maclaren-Jones (Liberal)	Sarah Mitchell (National)	David Shoebridge (Greens)	Niall Blair (National)	Jeremy Buckingham (Greens/ Independent)	Robert Brown (SFF)	Paul Green (Christian Democrats	Scot MacDonald (Liberal)	Ernest Wong (Labor)	Duncan Gay (National)	Jan Barham (Greens)	Greg Pearce (Liberal)	Peter Phelps (Liberal)	Mike Gallacher (Liberal/ Independent)	Rick Colless (National)	Greg Donnelly (Labor)	Peter Primrose (Labor)	2013	2011–2015	2013	Robert Borsak (SFF)	Adam Searle (Labor)	Luke Foley (Labor)	Walt Secord (Labor)	Mehreen Faruqi (Greens)	Lynda Voltz (Labor)	Amanda Fazio (Labor)	Mick Veitch (Labor)	Melinda Pavey (National)	Jenny Gardiner (National)	Don Harwin (Liberal)	John Ajaka (Liberal)	Matthew Mason-Cox (Liberal/ Independent/ Liberal)	Fred Nile (Christian Democrats/ Independent)	John Kaye (Greens)	Sophie Cotsis (Labor)	Shaoquett Moselmane (Labor)	Marie Ficarra (Liberal/ Independent)	Charlie Lynn (Liberal)	Trevor Khan (National)	Helen Westwood (Labor)	2013	2011–2015
2011–2015	2014	42 Councillors			Penny Sharpe (Labor)	Steve Whan (Labor)	Catherine Cusack (Liberal)	David Clarke (Liberal)	Natasha Maclaren-Jones (Liberal)	Sarah Mitchell (National)	David Shoebridge (Greens)	Niall Blair (National)	Jeremy Buckingham (Greens/ Independent)	Robert Brown (SFF)	Paul Green (Christian Democrats	Scot MacDonald (Liberal)	Ernest Wong (Labor)	Duncan Gay (National)	Jan Barham (Greens)	Greg Pearce (Liberal)	Peter Phelps (Liberal)	Mike Gallacher (Liberal/ Independent)	Rick Colless (National)	Greg Donnelly (Labor)	Peter Primrose (Labor)	2014	2011–2015	2014	Robert Borsak (SFF)	Adam Searle (Labor)	Luke Foley (Labor)	Walt Secord (Labor)	Mehreen Faruqi (Greens)	Lynda Voltz (Labor)	Amanda Fazio (Labor)	Mick Veitch (Labor)	Melinda Pavey (National)	Jenny Gardiner (National)	Don Harwin (Liberal)	John Ajaka (Liberal)	Matthew Mason-Cox (Liberal/ Independent/ Liberal)	Fred Nile (Christian Democrats/ Independent)	John Kaye (Greens)	Sophie Cotsis (Labor)	Shaoquett Moselmane (Labor)	Marie Ficarra (Liberal/ Independent)	Charlie Lynn (Liberal)	Trevor Khan (National)	Helen Westwood (Labor)	2014	2011–2015
2011–2015	2015	42 Councillors			Vacant	Vacant	Catherine Cusack (Liberal)	David Clarke (Liberal)	Natasha Maclaren-Jones (Liberal)	Sarah Mitchell (National)	David Shoebridge (Greens)	Niall Blair (National)	Jeremy Buckingham (Greens/ Independent)	Robert Brown (SFF)	Paul Green (Christian Democrats	Scot MacDonald (Liberal)	Ernest Wong (Labor)	Duncan Gay (National)	Jan Barham (Greens)	Greg Pearce (Liberal)	Peter Phelps (Liberal)	Mike Gallacher (Liberal/ Independent)	Rick Colless (National)	Greg Donnelly (Labor)	Peter Primrose (Labor)	2015	2011–2015	2015	Robert Borsak (SFF)	Adam Searle (Labor)	Luke Foley (Labor)	Walt Secord (Labor)	Mehreen Faruqi (Greens)	Lynda Voltz (Labor)	Amanda Fazio (Labor)	Mick Veitch (Labor)	Melinda Pavey (National)	Jenny Gardiner (National)	Don Harwin (Liberal)	John Ajaka (Liberal)	Matthew Mason-Cox (Liberal/ Independent/ Liberal)	Fred Nile (Christian Democrats/ Independent)	John Kaye (Greens)	Sophie Cotsis (Labor)	Shaoquett Moselmane (Labor)	Marie Ficarra (Liberal/ Independent)	Charlie Lynn (Liberal)	Trevor Khan (National)	Helen Westwood (Labor)	2015	2011–2015
2015–2019	2015	42 Councillors			Vacant	Vacant	Catherine Cusack (Liberal)	David Clarke (Liberal)	Natasha Maclaren-Jones (Liberal)	Sarah Mitchell (National)	David Shoebridge (Greens)	Niall Blair (National)	Jeremy Buckingham (Greens/ Independent)	Robert Brown (SFF)	Paul Green (Christian Democrats	Scot MacDonald (Liberal)	Ernest Wong (Labor)	Duncan Gay (National)	Jan Barham (Greens)	Greg Pearce (Liberal)	Peter Phelps (Liberal)	Mike Gallacher (Liberal/ Independent)	Rick Colless (National)	Greg Donnelly (Labor)	Peter Primrose (Labor)	2015	2015–2019	2015	Robert Borsak (SFF)	Adam Searle (Labor)	Lou Amato (Liberal)	Walt Secord (Labor)	Mehreen Faruqi (Greens)	Lynda Voltz (Labor)	Mark Pearson (Animal Justice)	Mick Veitch (Labor)	Bronnie Taylor (National)	Ben Franklin (National)	Don Harwin (Liberal)	John Ajaka (Liberal)	Matthew Mason-Cox (Liberal/ Independent/ Liberal)	Fred Nile (Christian Democrats/ Independent)	John Kaye (Greens)	Sophie Cotsis (Labor)	Shaoquett Moselmane (Labor)	Scott Farlow (Liberal)	Shayne Mallard (Liberal)	Trevor Khan (National)	Courtney Houssos (Labor)	2015	2015–2019
2015–2019	2015	42 Councillors			Penny Sharpe (Labor)	Daniel Mookhey (Labor)	Catherine Cusack (Liberal)	David Clarke (Liberal)	Natasha Maclaren-Jones (Liberal)	Sarah Mitchell (National)	David Shoebridge (Greens)	Niall Blair (National)	Jeremy Buckingham (Greens/ Independent)	Robert Brown (SFF)	Paul Green (Christian Democrats	Scot MacDonald (Liberal)	Ernest Wong (Labor)	Duncan Gay (National)	Jan Barham (Greens)	Greg Pearce (Liberal)	Peter Phelps (Liberal)	Mike Gallacher (Liberal/ Independent)	Rick Colless (National)	Greg Donnelly (Labor)	Peter Primrose (Labor)	2015	2015–2019	2015	Robert Borsak (SFF)	Adam Searle (Labor)	Lou Amato (Liberal)	Walt Secord (Labor)	Mehreen Faruqi (Greens)	Lynda Voltz (Labor)	Mark Pearson (Animal Justice)	Mick Veitch (Labor)	Bronnie Taylor (National)	Ben Franklin (National)	Don Harwin (Liberal)	John Ajaka (Liberal)	Matthew Mason-Cox (Liberal/ Independent/ Liberal)	Fred Nile (Christian Democrats/ Independent)	John Kaye (Greens)	Sophie Cotsis (Labor)	Shaoquett Moselmane (Labor)	Scott Farlow (Liberal)	Shayne Mallard (Liberal)	Trevor Khan (National)	Courtney Houssos (Labor)	2015	2015–2019
2015–2019	2016	42 Councillors			Penny Sharpe (Labor)	Daniel Mookhey (Labor)	Catherine Cusack (Liberal)	David Clarke (Liberal)	Natasha Maclaren-Jones (Liberal)	Sarah Mitchell (National)	David Shoebridge (Greens)	Niall Blair (National)	Jeremy Buckingham (Greens/ Independent)	Robert Brown (SFF)	Paul Green (Christian Democrats	Scot MacDonald (Liberal)	Ernest Wong (Labor)	Duncan Gay (National)	Jan Barham (Greens)	Greg Pearce (Liberal)	Peter Phelps (Liberal)	Mike Gallacher (Liberal/ Independent)	Rick Colless (National)	Greg Donnelly (Labor)	Peter Primrose (Labor)	2016	2015–2019	2016	Robert Borsak (SFF)	Adam Searle (Labor)	Lou Amato (Liberal)	Walt Secord (Labor)	Mehreen Faruqi (Greens)	Lynda Voltz (Labor)	Mark Pearson (Animal Justice)	Mick Veitch (Labor)	Bronnie Taylor (National)	Ben Franklin (National)	Don Harwin (Liberal)	John Ajaka (Liberal)	Matthew Mason-Cox (Liberal/ Independent/ Liberal)	Fred Nile (Christian Democrats/ Independent)	Justin Field (Greens/ Independent)	John Graham (Labor)	Shaoquett Moselmane (Labor)	Scott Farlow (Liberal)	Shayne Mallard (Liberal)	Trevor Khan (National)	Courtney Houssos (Labor)	2016	2015–2019
2015–2019	2017	42 Councillors			Penny Sharpe (Labor)	Daniel Mookhey (Labor)	Catherine Cusack (Liberal)	David Clarke (Liberal)	Natasha Maclaren-Jones (Liberal)	Sarah Mitchell (National)	David Shoebridge (Greens)	Niall Blair (National)	Jeremy Buckingham (Greens/ Independent)	Robert Brown (SFF)	Paul Green (Christian Democrats	Scot MacDonald (Liberal)	Ernest Wong (Labor)	Wes Fang (National)	Dawn Walker (Greens)	Natalie Ward (Liberal)	Peter Phelps (Liberal)	Taylor Martin (Liberal/ Independent)	Rick Colless (National)	Greg Donnelly (Labor)	Peter Primrose (Labor)	2017	2015–2019	2017	Robert Borsak (SFF)	Adam Searle (Labor)	Lou Amato (Liberal)	Walt Secord (Labor)	Mehreen Faruqi (Greens)	Lynda Voltz (Labor)	Mark Pearson (Animal Justice)	Mick Veitch (Labor)	Bronnie Taylor (National)	Ben Franklin (National)	Don Harwin (Liberal)	John Ajaka (Liberal)	Matthew Mason-Cox (Liberal/ Independent/ Liberal)	Fred Nile (Christian Democrats/ Independent)	Justin Field (Greens/ Independent)	John Graham (Labor)	Shaoquett Moselmane (Labor)	Scott Farlow (Liberal)	Shayne Mallard (Liberal)	Trevor Khan (National)	Courtney Houssos (Labor)	2017	2015–2019
2015–2019	2018	42 Councillors			Penny Sharpe (Labor)	Daniel Mookhey (Labor)	Catherine Cusack (Liberal)	David Clarke (Liberal)	Natasha Maclaren-Jones (Liberal)	Sarah Mitchell (National)	David Shoebridge (Greens)	Niall Blair (National)	Jeremy Buckingham (Greens/ Independent)	Robert Brown (SFF)	Paul Green (Christian Democrats	Scot MacDonald (Liberal)	Ernest Wong (Labor)	Wes Fang (National)	Dawn Walker (Greens)	Natalie Ward (Liberal)	Peter Phelps (Liberal)	Taylor Martin (Liberal/ Independent)	Rick Colless (National)	Greg Donnelly (Labor)	Peter Primrose (Labor)	2018	2015–2019	2018	Robert Borsak (SFF)	Adam Searle (Labor)	Lou Amato (Liberal)	Walt Secord (Labor)	Cate Faehrmann (Greens)	Lynda Voltz (Labor)	Mark Pearson (Animal Justice)	Mick Veitch (Labor)	Bronnie Taylor (National)	Ben Franklin (National)	Don Harwin (Liberal)	John Ajaka (Liberal)	Matthew Mason-Cox (Liberal/ Independent/ Liberal)	Fred Nile (Christian Democrats/ Independent)	Justin Field (Greens/ Independent)	John Graham (Labor)	Shaoquett Moselmane (Labor)	Scott Farlow (Liberal)	Shayne Mallard (Liberal)	Trevor Khan (National)	Courtney Houssos (Labor)	2018	2015–2019
2015–2019	2019	42 Councillors			Penny Sharpe (Labor)	Daniel Mookhey (Labor)	Catherine Cusack (Liberal)	David Clarke (Liberal)	Natasha Maclaren-Jones (Liberal)	Sarah Mitchell (National)	David Shoebridge (Greens)	Niall Blair (National)	Jeremy Buckingham (Greens/ Independent)	Robert Brown (SFF)	Paul Green (Christian Democrats	Scot MacDonald (Liberal)	Ernest Wong (Labor)	Wes Fang (National)	Dawn Walker (Greens)	Natalie Ward (Liberal)	Peter Phelps (Liberal)	Taylor Martin (Liberal/ Independent)	Rick Colless (National)	Greg Donnelly (Labor)	Peter Primrose (Labor)	2019	2015–2019	2019	Robert Borsak (SFF)	Adam Searle (Labor)	Lou Amato (Liberal)	Walt Secord (Labor)	Cate Faehrmann (Greens)	Vacant	Mark Pearson (Animal Justice)	Mick Veitch (Labor)	Bronnie Taylor (National)	Vacant	Don Harwin (Liberal)	John Ajaka (Liberal)	Matthew Mason-Cox (Liberal/ Independent/ Liberal)	Fred Nile (Christian Democrats/ Independent)	Justin Field (Greens/ Independent)	John Graham (Labor)	Shaoquett Moselmane (Labor)	Scott Farlow (Liberal)	Shayne Mallard (Liberal)	Trevor Khan (National)	Courtney Houssos (Labor)	2019	2015–2019
2019–2023	2019	42 Councillors			Penny Sharpe (Labor)	Daniel Mookhey (Labor)	Catherine Cusack (Liberal)	Mark Latham (One Nation)	Natasha Maclaren-Jones (Liberal)	Sarah Mitchell (National)	David Shoebridge (Greens)	Niall Blair (National)	Emma Hurst (Animal Justice)	Mark Banasiak (SFF)	Tara Moriarty (Labor)	Mark Buttigieg (Labor)	Anthony D'Adam (Labor)	Wes Fang (National)	Abigail Boyd (Greens)	Natalie Ward (Liberal)	Damien Tudehope (Liberal)	Taylor Martin (Liberal/ Independent)	Rod Roberts (One Nation/ Independent)	Greg Donnelly (Labor)	Peter Primrose (Labor)	2019	2019–2023	2019	Robert Borsak (SFF)	Adam Searle (Labor)	Lou Amato (Liberal)	Walt Secord (Labor)	Cate Faehrmann (Greens)	Vacant	Mark Pearson (Animal Justice)	Mick Veitch (Labor)	Bronnie Taylor (National)	Vacant	Don Harwin (Liberal)	John Ajaka (Liberal)	Matthew Mason-Cox (Liberal/ Independent/ Liberal)	Fred Nile (Christian Democrats/ Independent)	Justin Field (Greens/ Independent)	John Graham (Labor)	Shaoquett Moselmane (Labor)	Scott Farlow (Liberal)	Shayne Mallard (Liberal)	Trevor Khan (National)	Courtney Houssos (Labor)	2019	2019–2023
2019–2023	2019	42 Councillors			Penny Sharpe (Labor)	Daniel Mookhey (Labor)	Catherine Cusack (Liberal)	Mark Latham (One Nation)	Natasha Maclaren-Jones (Liberal)	Sarah Mitchell (National)	David Shoebridge (Greens)	Sam Farraway (National)	Emma Hurst (Animal Justice)	Mark Banasiak (SFF)	Tara Moriarty (Labor)	Mark Buttigieg (Labor)	Anthony D'Adam (Labor)	Wes Fang (National)	Abigail Boyd (Greens)	Natalie Ward (Liberal)	Damien Tudehope (Liberal)	Taylor Martin (Liberal/ Independent)	Rod Roberts (One Nation/ Independent)	Greg Donnelly (Labor)	Peter Primrose (Labor)	2019	2019–2023	2019	Robert Borsak (SFF)	Adam Searle (Labor)	Lou Amato (Liberal)	Walt Secord (Labor)	Cate Faehrmann (Greens)	Rose Jackson (Labor)	Mark Pearson (Animal Justice)	Mick Veitch (Labor)	Bronnie Taylor (National)	Ben Franklin (National)	Don Harwin (Liberal)	John Ajaka (Liberal)	Matthew Mason-Cox (Liberal/ Independent/ Liberal)	Fred Nile (Christian Democrats/ Independent)	Justin Field (Greens/ Independent)	John Graham (Labor)	Shaoquett Moselmane (Labor)	Scott Farlow (Liberal)	Shayne Mallard (Liberal)	Trevor Khan (National)	Courtney Houssos (Labor)	2019	2019–2023
2019–2023	Early May 2021	42 Councillors			Penny Sharpe (Labor)	Daniel Mookhey (Labor)	Catherine Cusack (Liberal)	Mark Latham (One Nation)	Natasha Maclaren-Jones (Liberal)	Sarah Mitchell (National)	David Shoebridge (Greens)	Sam Farraway (National)	Emma Hurst (Animal Justice)	Mark Banasiak (SFF)	Tara Moriarty (Labor)	Mark Buttigieg (Labor)	Anthony D'Adam (Labor)	Wes Fang (National)	Abigail Boyd (Greens)	Natalie Ward (Liberal)	Damien Tudehope (Liberal)	Taylor Martin (Liberal/ Independent)	Rod Roberts (One Nation/ Independent)	Greg Donnelly (Labor)	Peter Primrose (Labor)	Early May 2021	2019–2023	Early May 2021	Robert Borsak (SFF)	Adam Searle (Labor)	Lou Amato (Liberal)	Walt Secord (Labor)	Cate Faehrmann (Greens)	Rose Jackson (Labor)	Mark Pearson (Animal Justice)	Mick Veitch (Labor)	Bronnie Taylor (National)	Ben Franklin (National)	Don Harwin (Liberal)	Peter Poulos (Liberal)	Matthew Mason-Cox (Liberal/ Independent/ Liberal)	Fred Nile (Christian Democrats/ Independent)	Justin Field (Greens/ Independent)	John Graham (Labor)	Shaoquett Moselmane (Labor)	Scott Farlow (Liberal)	Shayne Mallard (Liberal)	Trevor Khan (National)	Courtney Houssos (Labor)	Early May 2021	2019–2023
2019–2023	Late May 2021	42 Councillors			Penny Sharpe (Labor)	Daniel Mookhey (Labor)	Catherine Cusack (Liberal)	Mark Latham (One Nation)	Natasha Maclaren-Jones (Liberal)	Sarah Mitchell (National)	David Shoebridge (Greens)	Sam Farraway (National)	Emma Hurst (Animal Justice)	Mark Banasiak (SFF)	Tara Moriarty (Labor)	Mark Buttigieg (Labor)	Anthony D'Adam (Labor)	Wes Fang (National)	Abigail Boyd (Greens)	Natalie Ward (Liberal)	Damien Tudehope (Liberal)	Taylor Martin (Liberal/ Independent)	Rod Roberts (One Nation/ Independent)	Greg Donnelly (Labor)	Peter Primrose (Labor)	Late May 2021	2019–2023	Late May 2021	Robert Borsak (SFF)	Adam Searle (Labor)	Lou Amato (Liberal)	Walt Secord (Labor)	Cate Faehrmann (Greens)	Rose Jackson (Labor)	Mark Pearson (Animal Justice)	Mick Veitch (Labor)	Bronnie Taylor (National)	Ben Franklin (National)	Don Harwin (Liberal)	Peter Poulos (Liberal)	Matthew Mason-Cox (Liberal/ Independent/ Liberal)	Fred Nile (Christian Democrats/ Independent)	Justin Field (Greens/ Independent)	John Graham (Labor)	Shaoquett Moselmane (Labor)	Scott Farlow (Liberal)	Shayne Mallard (Liberal)	Trevor Khan (National)	Courtney Houssos (Labor)	Late May 2021	2019–2023
2019–2023	2022	42 Councillors			Penny Sharpe (Labor)	Daniel Mookhey (Labor)	Aileen MacDonald (Liberal)	Mark Latham (One Nation)	Natasha Maclaren-Jones (Liberal)	Sarah Mitchell (National)	Sue Higginson (Greens)	Sam Farraway (National)	Emma Hurst (Animal Justice)	Mark Banasiak (SFF)	Tara Moriarty (Labor)	Mark Buttigieg (Labor)	Anthony D'Adam (Labor)	Wes Fang (National)	Abigail Boyd (Greens)	Natalie Ward (Liberal)	Damien Tudehope (Liberal)	Taylor Martin (Liberal/ Independent)	Rod Roberts (One Nation/ Independent)	Greg Donnelly (Labor)	Peter Primrose (Labor)	2022	2019–2023	2022	Robert Borsak (SFF)	Adam Searle (Labor)	Lou Amato (Liberal)	Walt Secord (Labor)	Cate Faehrmann (Greens)	Rose Jackson (Labor)	Mark Pearson (Animal Justice)	Mick Veitch (Labor)	Bronnie Taylor (National)	Ben Franklin (National)	Chris Rath (Liberal)	Peter Poulos (Liberal)	Matthew Mason-Cox (Liberal/ Independent/ Liberal)	Fred Nile (Christian Democrats/ Independent)	Justin Field (Greens/ Independent)	John Graham (Labor)	Shaoquett Moselmane (Labor)	Scott Farlow (Liberal)	Shayne Mallard (Liberal)	Scott Barrett (National)	Courtney Houssos (Labor)	2022	2019–2023
2019–2023	2023	42 Councillors			Penny Sharpe (Labor)	Daniel Mookhey (Labor)	Aileen MacDonald (Liberal)	Vacant	Vacant	Sarah Mitchell (National)	Sue Higginson (Greens)	Sam Farraway (National)	Emma Hurst (Animal Justice)	Mark Banasiak (SFF)	Tara Moriarty (Labor)	Mark Buttigieg (Labor)	Anthony D'Adam (Labor)	Wes Fang (National)	Abigail Boyd (Greens)	Natalie Ward (Liberal)	Damien Tudehope (Liberal)	Taylor Martin (Liberal/ Independent)	Rod Roberts (One Nation/ Independent)	Greg Donnelly (Labor)	Peter Primrose (Labor)	2023	2019–2023	2023	Robert Borsak (SFF)	Adam Searle (Labor)	Lou Amato (Liberal)	Walt Secord (Labor)	Cate Faehrmann (Greens)	Rose Jackson (Labor)	Mark Pearson (Animal Justice)	Mick Veitch (Labor)	Bronnie Taylor (National)	Ben Franklin (National)	Chris Rath (Liberal)	Peter Poulos (Liberal)	Matthew Mason-Cox (Liberal/ Independent/ Liberal)	Fred Nile (Christian Democrats/ Independent)	Justin Field (Greens/ Independent)	John Graham (Labor)	Shaoquett Moselmane (Labor)	Scott Farlow (Liberal)	Shayne Mallard (Liberal)	Scott Barrett (National)	Courtney Houssos (Labor)	2023	2019–2023
2023–2027	2023	42 Councillors			Penny Sharpe (Labor)	Daniel Mookhey (Labor)	Aileen MacDonald (Liberal)	Vacant	Vacant	Sarah Mitchell (National)	Sue Higginson (Greens)	Sam Farraway (National)	Emma Hurst (Animal Justice)	Mark Banasiak (SFF)	Tara Moriarty (Labor)	Mark Buttigieg (Labor)	Anthony D'Adam (Labor)	Wes Fang (National)	Abigail Boyd (Greens)	Natalie Ward (Liberal)	Damien Tudehope (Liberal)	Taylor Martin (Liberal/ Independent)	Rod Roberts (One Nation/ Independent)	Greg Donnelly (Labor)	Peter Primrose (Labor)	2023	2023–2027	2023	Robert Borsak (SFF)	Stephen Lawrence (Labor)	Mark Latham (One Nation/ Independent)	Sarah Kaine (Labor)	Cate Faehrmann (Greens)	Rose Jackson (Labor)	Jeremy Buckingham (Legalise Cannabis)	Emily Suvaal (Labor)	Bronnie Taylor (National)	Ben Franklin (National)	Chris Rath (Liberal)	Susan Carter (Liberal)	Natasha Maclaren-Jones (Liberal)	John Ruddick (Liberal Democrats)	Amanda Cohn (Greens)	John Graham (Labor)	Cameron Murphy (Labor)	Rachel Merton (Liberal)	Jacqui Munro (Liberal)	Bob Nanva (Labor)	Courtney Houssos (Labor)	2023	2023–2027
2023–2027	2023	42 Councillors			Penny Sharpe (Labor)	Daniel Mookhey (Labor)	Aileen MacDonald (Liberal)	Tania Mihailuk (One Nation/ Independent)	Scott Farlow (Liberal)	Sarah Mitchell (National)	Sue Higginson (Greens)	Sam Farraway (National)	Emma Hurst (Animal Justice)	Mark Banasiak (SFF)	Tara Moriarty (Labor)	Mark Buttigieg (Labor)	Anthony D'Adam (Labor)	Wes Fang (National)	Abigail Boyd (Greens)	Natalie Ward (Liberal)	Damien Tudehope (Liberal)	Taylor Martin (Liberal/ Independent)	Rod Roberts (One Nation/ Independent)	Greg Donnelly (Labor)	Peter Primrose (Labor)	2023	2023–2027	2023	Robert Borsak (SFF)	Stephen Lawrence (Labor)	Mark Latham (One Nation/ Independent)	Sarah Kaine (Labor)	Cate Faehrmann (Greens)	Rose Jackson (Labor)	Jeremy Buckingham (Legalise Cannabis)	Emily Suvaal (Labor)	Bronnie Taylor (National)	Ben Franklin (National)	Chris Rath (Liberal)	Susan Carter (Liberal)	Natasha Maclaren-Jones (Liberal)	John Ruddick (Liberal Democrats)	Amanda Cohn (Greens)	John Graham (Labor)	Cameron Murphy (Labor)	Rachel Merton (Liberal)	Jacqui Munro (Liberal)	Bob Nanva (Labor)	Courtney Houssos (Labor)	2023	2023–2027
2023–2027	2024	42 Councillors			Penny Sharpe (Labor)	Daniel Mookhey (Labor)	Aileen MacDonald (Liberal)	Tania Mihailuk (One Nation/ Independent)	Scott Farlow (Liberal)	Sarah Mitchell (National)	Sue Higginson (Greens)	Sam Farraway (National)	Emma Hurst (Animal Justice)	Mark Banasiak (SFF)	Tara Moriarty (Labor)	Mark Buttigieg (Labor)	Anthony D'Adam (Labor)	Wes Fang (National)	Abigail Boyd (Greens)	Natalie Ward (Liberal)	Damien Tudehope (Liberal)	Taylor Martin (Liberal/ Independent)	Rod Roberts (One Nation/ Independent)	Greg Donnelly (Labor)	Peter Primrose (Labor)	2024	2023–2027	2024	Robert Borsak (SFF)	Stephen Lawrence (Labor)	Mark Latham (One Nation/ Independent)	Sarah Kaine (Labor)	Cate Faehrmann (Greens)	Rose Jackson (Labor)	Jeremy Buckingham (Legalise Cannabis)	Emily Suvaal (Labor)	Scott Barrett (National)	Ben Franklin (National)	Chris Rath (Liberal)	Susan Carter (Liberal)	Natasha Maclaren-Jones (Liberal)	John Ruddick (Liberal Democrats)	Amanda Cohn (Greens)	John Graham (Labor)	Cameron Murphy (Labor)	Rachel Merton (Liberal)	Jacqui Munro (Liberal)	Bob Nanva (Labor)	Courtney Houssos (Labor)	2024	2023–2027
2023–2027	2025	42 Councillors			Penny Sharpe (Labor)	Daniel Mookhey (Labor)	Aileen MacDonald (Liberal)	Tania Mihailuk (One Nation/ Independent)	Scott Farlow (Liberal)	Sarah Mitchell (National)	Sue Higginson (Greens)	Nichole Overall (National)	Emma Hurst (Animal Justice)	Mark Banasiak (SFF)	Tara Moriarty (Labor)	Mark Buttigieg (Labor)	Anthony D'Adam (Labor)	Wes Fang (National)	Abigail Boyd (Greens)	Natalie Ward (Liberal)	Damien Tudehope (Liberal)	Taylor Martin (Liberal/ Independent)	Rod Roberts (One Nation/ Independent)	Greg Donnelly (Labor)	Peter Primrose (Labor)	2025	2023–2027	2025	Robert Borsak (SFF)	Stephen Lawrence (Labor)	Mark Latham (One Nation/ Independent)	Sarah Kaine (Labor)	Cate Faehrmann (Greens)	Rose Jackson (Labor)	Jeremy Buckingham (Legalise Cannabis)	Emily Suvaal (Labor)	Scott Barrett (National)	Ben Franklin (National)	Chris Rath (Liberal)	Susan Carter (Liberal)	Natasha Maclaren-Jones (Liberal)	John Ruddick (Liberal Democrats)	Amanda Cohn (Greens)	John Graham (Labor)	Cameron Murphy (Labor)	Rachel Merton (Liberal)	Jacqui Munro (Liberal)	Bob Nanva (Labor)	Courtney Houssos (Labor)	2025	2023–2027
