= Results of the 2007 New South Wales state election (Legislative Council) =

Legislative Council election for New South Wales, Australia in March 2007

2007 New South Wales state election (Legislative Council)
- 24 March 2007

21 of the 42 seats in the Legislative Council 21 seats needed for a majority

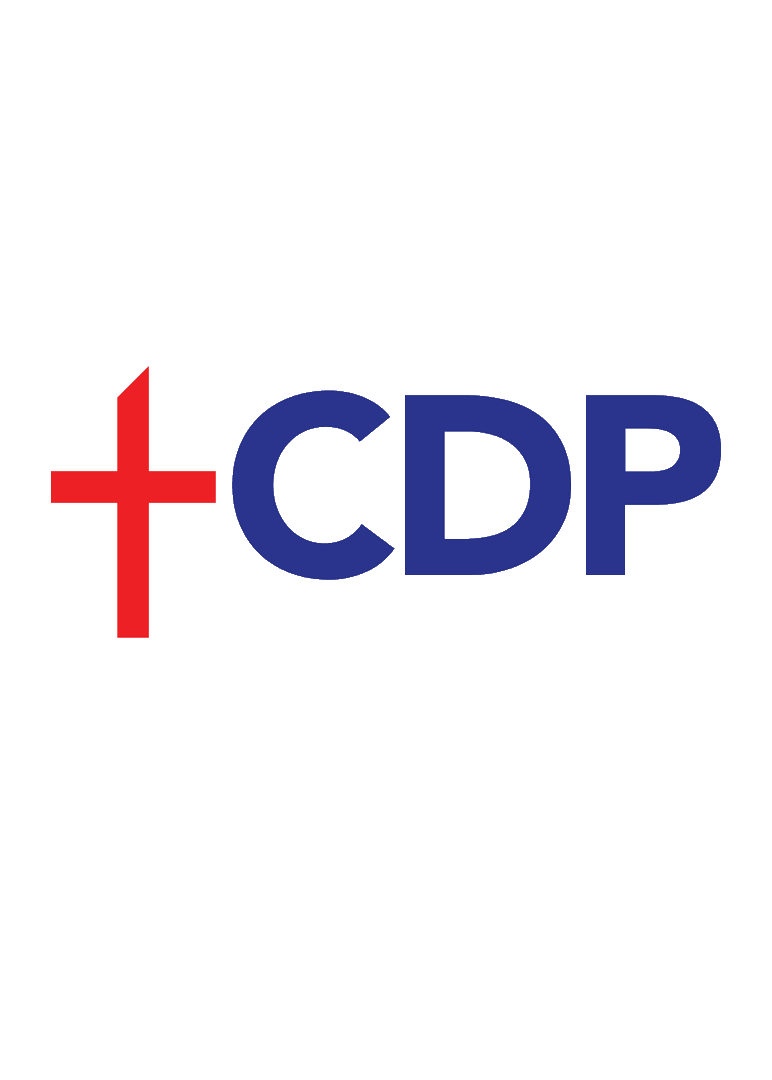
	First party	Second party	Third party
		L/NP
Leader	John Della Bosca	Mike Gallacher	None
Party	Labor	Coalition	Greens
Seats before	18	13	3
Seats won	9	8	2
Seats after	19	15	4
Seat change	▲1	▲2	▲1
Popular vote	1,491,719	1,304,166	347,548
Percentage	39.14%	34.22%	9.12%
Swing	▼4.40pp	▲0.92pp	▲0.52pp
	Fourth party	Fifth party
		SFF
Leader	Fred Nile	Roy Smith
Party	Christian Democrats	SFF
Seats before	2	2
Seats won	1	1
Seats after	2	2
Seat change	Steady	Steady
Popular vote	168,545	106,513
Percentage	4.42%	2.79%
Swing	▲1.39pp	▲0.74pp

This is a list of results for the Legislative Council at the 2007 New South Wales state election.

== Results ==
2007 New South Wales state election: Legislative Council
Party	Candidate	Votes	%	±%
Quota		173,239		
Labor	1. John Della Bosca (elected 1); 2. Ian Macdonald (elected 4); 3. John Hatzistergos (elected 6); 4. Lynda Voltz (elected 8); 5. Eddie Obeid (elected 10); 6. Helen Westwood (elected 12); 7. Amanda Fazio (elected 14); 8. Henry Tsang (elected 16); 9. Mick Veitch (elected 19); 10. Tony Keating; 11. Pauline James; 12. Sandra Woods; 13. Barry Calvert; 14. Robert Doherty; 15. Glenda Gartrell; 16. Tegan Alchin; 17. Brendan Cavanagh; 18. Rob Allen	1,491,719	39.14	−4.40
Liberal/National Coalition	1. Charlie Lynn (elected 2); 2. Jenny Gardiner (elected 5); 3. Don Harwin (elected 7); 4. Matthew Mason-Cox (elected 9); 5. Melinda Pavey (elected 11); 6. John Ajaka (elected 13); 7. Marie Ficarra (elected 15); 8. Trevor Khan (elected 21); 9. Scot MacDonald; 10. John Caputo; 11. Peter Burnheim; 12. Sarah Lawrance; 13. Stephen Choularton; 14. Lynette Webster; 15. Warwick Moppett	1,304,166	34.22	+0.92
Greens	1. Lee Rhiannon (elected 3); 2. John Kaye (elected 17); 3. Ben Oquist; 4. Lesa de Leau; 5. Marika Kontellis; 6. Saeed Khan; 7. Michael Sergent; 8. Patricia Tsang; 9. Dominic Kanak; 10. Eleanor Gibbs; 11. Wendy White; 12. Vanessa Grindon-Ekins; 13. Peter Stahel; 14. Sandra Heilpern; 15. Jennifer Hanson; 16. Keith Hughes; 17. Jan Green; 18. Stephen Allen; 19. Andrew Martin; 20. James Diack; 21. Jodie Coleman	347,548	9.12	+0.52
Christian Democrats	1. Fred Nile (elected 18); 2. Gary Raymond; 3. Brian Watters; 4. June Dally-Watkins; 5. Peter Barnes; 6. Kevin Hume; 7. Peter Walker; 8. Peter Rahme; 9. Len Kingston; 10. Arthur Moore; 11. Gamil Helmy-Kostandy; 12. Elwyn Sheppard; 13. Barry Small; 14. Brendan Johnston; 15. Elaine Nile; 16. Kylie Laurence; 17. Margaret Ratcliffe; 18. Gilbert Van Der Jadgt; 19. Malcolm Smith; 20. Ian Smith; 21. Donald Jamieson	168,545	4.42	+1.39
Shooters	1. Roy Smith (elected 20); 2. Robert Borsak; 3. Joan Maraldo; 4. Robyn Bourke; 5. David Cook; 6. James Muirhead; 7. Alison Newbery; 8. Robert Shaw; 9. John Howden; 10. Stephen Mainstone; 11. Teresa Alexeeff; 12. Barry Shade; 13. Jeffrey Bond; 14. Andrew Mallen; 15. Rodney Franich; 16. James Thomley; 17. Alois Ambs; 18. Ashley Coombs; 19. Mitchell Newbery	106,513	2.79	+0.74
Democrats	1. Arthur Chesterfield-Evans; 2. Lyn Shumack; 3. Carolyn Hastie; 4. Brett Paterson; 5. David King; 6. Michelle Bleicher; 7. Christopher Owens; 8. Stephen Bingle; 9. Pamela Clifford; 10. Josephine Nicotra; 11. Felicity Boyd; 12. Brian Day; 13. Harry Boyle; 14. John Haydon; 15. Audrey Pratt; 16. Surb Bhatti	67,994	1.78	−0.21
AAFI	1. Janey Woodger; 2. Al Heinrichs; 3. Kenneth O'Leary; 4. Robert Girvan; 5. Kenneth Sptragg; 6. James Bateman; 7. Patricia Bateman; 8. Eddington Sherwood; 9. John Campbell; 10. James Clarke; 11. Roy Butler; 12. Jane Heinrichs; 13. John Woodger; 14. Paul Higgins; 15. Peter James	62,386	1.64	+0.74
Fishing Party	1. Robert Smith; 2. Elizabeth Stocker; 3. Mark Stocker; 4. Deanne Shepherd; 5. Gary Hyland; 6. Stewart Paterson; 7. Marcus Soane; 8. David Hitchcock; 9. Craig Oaten; 10. Darren McCook; 11. Jason Downie; 12. Craig McCartney; 13. David McCartney; 14. Les Proctor; 15. Bill Lee; 16. Elvis Besirevic; 17. Rex Buckley; 18. Ken Martin; 19. Bruce Wall; 20. Roe Martin	58,340	1.53	+1.53
Unity	1. Le Lam; 2. Bob Reid; 3. Therese Le-dang; 4. Muhammet Eris; 5. Willis Phong; 6. Bernadette Waters; 7. Shan Su; 8. Addy Cheong; 9. Jennifer Jacovou; 10. Emine Aslan; 11. Khanh Mach; 12. Bayram Ceylan; 13. Bulent Kadayifci; 14. Marta Aquino; 15. Zhi Wang; 16. Nai Wong; 17. Si Wu; 18. Jian Zeng	46,053	1.21	−0.21
Restore Workers Rights	1. Barry Gissell; 2. Charles Winter; 3. Anthony Adams; 4. James Forbes; 5. Jody Gissell; 6. Clifford Walford; 7. Denis Nash; 8. Frederick Walford; 9. Caroline Johnson; 10. Robyn Walford; 11. Janelle Smith; 12. Donna Adams; 13. Gai Taylor; 14. Julie Parsons; 15. Todd Marr; 16. Gloria Walker; 17. Yvonne King; 18. David McCabe	35,218	0.92	+0.92
Group A	1. Nell Brown; 2. Marylou Carter; 3. Luisa Mockler; 4. Mary Mockler; 5. Lina Aggett; 6. Joyce Bellchambers; 7. Wendy Stepkovitch; 8. Robyn Chapman; 9. Lyn Allen; 10. Estelle Shields; 11. Mel Pesa; 12. David Carter; 13. Maree Buckwalter; 14. Nick Stepkovitch; 15. Betty Stepkovitch; 16. Ella Ricketson	25,942	0.68	+0.68
Horse Riders / Outdoor Recreation	1. Graham Crossley; 2. Frank Sanzari; 3. Wendy Smallwood; 4. Robert Kelly; 5. Debra Avis; 6. Alex Stitt; 7. Babette Gomme; 8. Garth Coulter; 9. Raymond Hamilton; 10. Bruce Close; 11. Gary Weingartner; 12. Jennifer Harris; 13. Grant Stone; 14. David Harris; 15. John Gibbins	21,569	0.57	+0.57
Group F	1. Patrice Newell; 2. Genia McCaffery; 3. Matt Noffs; 4. John McInerney; 5. Louise Upton; 6. Caroline Pidcock; 7. Alicia Campbell; 8. Vicki Younger; 9. David Jeffery; 10. Joe Herbertson; 11. Luke Williams; 12. Lindsay Johnston; 13. John Polglase; 14. Bruce Ward; 15. Christopher Sanderson; 16. Stan Glaser; 17. Michael Heffernan; 18. Ben Grace; 19. Basia Rendall; 20. Alexandra Morphett	18,999	0.50	+0.50
Human Rights Party	1. Peter Breen; 2. Claudette Palmer; 3. Miralem Nikolovski; 4. Bosko Velevski; 5. Dzevdet Alic; 6. Suzana Panovska; 7. Ljupco Poposki; 8. Valery Murphy; 9. Angela Mammone; 10. Janette Warby; 11. Erin Peak; 12. Maree Breen; 13. Catherine Byrne; 14. Michael Davis; 15. Diane Thomas	16,772	0.44	+0.44
Socialist Alliance	1. Jakalene X 2. Susan Price; 3. Raul Bassi; 4. Rachel Evans; 5. Marie McKern; 6. Margaret Perrot; 7. Maureen Frances; 8. Geoff Payne; 9. Simon Cunich; 10. Lisa Macdonald; 11. Aaron Benedek; 12. Nick Fredman; 13. Amber Pike; 14. Adam Leeman; 15. Tamara Pearson; 16. Kamala Emanuel	15,142	0.40	+0.25
Save Our Suburbs	1. Tony Recsei; 2. Colin Freeman; 3. Janine Kitson; 4. Jean Lennane; 5. Pat Garnet; 6. Bernie Laughlan; 7. John Ward; 8. Anthony Meaney; 9. Ted Webber; 10. Barry Hadaway; 11. Antony Howe; 12. Jean Posen; 13. Rosemary Hadaway; 14. Marga Van Gennip; 15. Allan Butt; 16. Ross Collins; 17. Leanne Gavagna	11,951	0.31	−0.17
Independent	Dawn Fraser	4,460	0.12	+0.12
Group M	1. Jack Tait; 2. Noeline Franklin; 3. Joe Chidiac; 4. Ian Franklin; 5. Geoff Davis; 6. Harry Segal; 7. Arthur Dyason; 8. Edward Hayman; 9. Chris Ripoll; 10. Mark Wyman; 11. Dave Pratt; 12. Ernest Braden; 13. Ben Innes; 14. Liz Innes; 15. James Anderson	3,464	0.09	+0.09
Group H	1. Kerry McNally; 2. Stephanie Badger; 3. Greg Hamilton; 4. Ralph Karpin; 5. Jean McCartney; 6. Clinton Portors; 7. Geoff Coulin; 8. Tracey Padwick; 9. Dennis Deegan; 10. Michael Braham; 11. Samone Mason; 12. Tom Thompson; 13. Andrew Katelaris; 14. Tricia Clayton; 15. Darren Erskine	3,143	0.08	+0.08
Group D	1. Nick Beams; 2. Terry Cook; 3. Carol Divjak; 4. Barry Jobson; 5. Peter Symonds; 6. Mike Head; 7. Gabriela Zabala; 8. Karen Hopperdietzel; 9. Clay Robinson; 10. Beryl Hood; 11. Mile Klindo; 12. John Plater; 13. Regina Lohr; 14. John Christian; 15. Ismet Redzovic	456	0.01	+0.01
Independent	David Rofe	416	0.01	+0.01
Independent	Jordie Bodlay	144		
Independent	Richard Carbury	111		
Independent	Ryan Lovett	85		
Independent	Alasdair Macdonald	69		
Independent	Jose Nunez	40		
Total formal votes		3,811,245	93.89	−0.77
Informal votes		247,921	6.11	+0.77
Turnout		4,059,166	92.80	+0.78

== Continuing members ==
The following MLCs were not up for re-election this year.

Member	Party	Term
Tony Catanzariti	Labor	2003–2011
Michael Costa	Labor	2003–2011
Greg Donnelly	Labor	2005–2011
Kayee Griffin	Labor	2003–2011
Tony Kelly	Labor	2003–2011
Peter Primrose	Labor	2003–2011
Christine Robertson	Labor	2003–2011
Eric Roozendaal	Labor	2004–2011
Penny Sharpe	Labor	2005–2011
Ian West	Labor	2003–2011
David Clarke	Liberal	2003–2011
Catherine Cusack	Liberal	2003–2011
Mike Gallacher	Liberal	2003–2011
Robyn Parker	Liberal	2003–2011
Greg Pearce	Liberal	2003–2011
Rick Colless	National	2003–2011
Duncan Gay	National	2003–2011
Ian Cohen	Greens	2003–2011
Sylvia Hale	Greens	2003–2011
Gordon Moyes	Christian Democrats	2003–2011
Robert Brown	Shooters Party	2006–2011

== See also ==
- Results of the 2007 New South Wales state election (Legislative Assembly)
- Candidates of the 2007 New South Wales state election
- Members of the New South Wales Legislative Council, 2007–2011
