= Members of the New South Wales Legislative Council, 2007–2011 =

Members of the New South Wales Legislative Council, 2007–2011

Members of the New South Wales Legislative Council who served in the 54th Parliament were elected at the 2003 and 2007 elections. As members serve eight-year terms, half of the Council was elected in 2003 and did not face re-election in 2007, and the members elected in 2007 did not face re-election until 2015. The President was Peter Primrose until 17 November 2009 and then Amanda Fazio.

Name	Party	End term	Years in office
John Ajaka	Liberal	2015	2007–2021
Robert Borsak (Note: Shooters and Fishers MLC Roy Smith died on 30 July 2010. Robert Borsak was appointed to the vacancy on 7 September 2010.)	Shooters	2015	2010–present
Robert Brown	Shooters	2011	2006–2019
Tony Catanzariti	Labor	2011	2003–2011
Ian Cohen	Greens	2011	1995–2011
David Clarke	Liberal	2011	2003–2019
Rick Colless	National	2011	2000–2019
Michael Costa (Note: Labor MLC Michael Costa resigned on 22 September 2008. Unions NSW secretary John Robertson was appointed to the vacancy on 28 October.)	Labor	2011	2001–2008
Sophie Cotsis (Note: Labor MLC John Della Bosca resigned on 30 July 2010. Sophie Cotsis was appointed to the vacancy on 7 September 2010.)	Labor	2015	2010–2016
Catherine Cusack	Liberal	2011	2003–2022
John Della Bosca	Labor	2015	1999–2010
Greg Donnelly	Labor	2011	2005–present
Cate Faehrmann (Note: Greens MLC Lee Rhiannon resigned on 19 July 2010 to contest a seat for the Federal Senate at the 2010 election. Former Director of the NSW Conservation Council Cate Faehrmann was appointed to the vacancy on 7 September 2010.)	Greens	2007	2010–2013, 2018–present
Amanda Fazio	Labor	2015	2000–2015
Marie Ficarra	Liberal	2015	2007–2015
Luke Foley (Note: Labor MLC Ian Macdonald resigned on 7 June 2010. Assistant general secretary of the NSW branch of the ALP Luke Foley was appointed to the vacancy on 10 June 2010.)	Labor	2015	2010–2015
Mike Gallacher	Liberal	2011	1996–2017
Jenny Gardiner	National	2015	1991–2015
Duncan Gay	National	2011	1988–2017
Kayee Griffin	Labor	2011	2003–2011
Sylvia Hale (Note: Greens MLC Sylvia Hale resigned on 6 September 2010. Hale had already announced her retirement at the coming election; her preselected replacement David Shoebridge was appointed to the vacancy on 7 September 2010.)	Greens	2011	2003–2010
Don Harwin	Liberal	2015	1999–2022
John Hatzistergos	Labor	2015	1999–2011
John Kaye	Greens	2015	2007–2016
Tony Kelly	Labor	2011	1987–1988, 1997–2011
Trevor Khan	National	2015	2007–2022
Charlie Lynn	Liberal	2015	1995–2015
Ian Macdonald	Labor	2015	1988–2010
Matthew Mason-Cox	Liberal	2015	2006–2023
Shaoquett Moselmane	Labor	2015	2009–2023
Gordon Moyes (Note: Christian Democratic Party MLC Gordon Moyes was expelled from the party in March 2009 and subsequently sat as an independent. In November 2009 he joined the Family First Party.)	Christian Democrats / Independent / Family First	2011	2002–2011
Fred Nile	Christian Democrats	2015	1981–2004, 2004–present
Eddie Obeid	Labor	2015	1991–2011
Robyn Parker	Liberal	2011	2003–2011
Melinda Pavey	National	2015	2002–2015
Greg Pearce	Liberal	2011	2000–2017
Peter Primrose	Labor	2011	1996–present
Lee Rhiannon	Greens	2007	1999–2010
John Robertson	Labor	2011	2008–2011
Christine Robertson	Labor	2011	2003–2011
Eric Roozendaal	Labor	2011	2004–2013
Penny Sharpe	Labor	2011	2005–2015, 2015–present
David Shoebridge	Greens	2011	2010–2022
Roy Smith	Shooters	2015	2007–2010
Henry Tsang	Labor	2011	1999–2009
Mick Veitch	Labor	2015	2007–2023
Lynda Voltz	Labor	2015	2007–2019
Ian West	Labor	2011	2000–2011
Helen Westwood	Labor	2015	2007–2015
