= Members of the New South Wales Legislative Council, 2019–2023 =

Members of the New South Wales Legislative Council, 2019–2023

Members of the New South Wales Legislative Council who served in the 57th Parliament were elected at the 2015 and 2019 elections. As members serve eight-year terms, half of the Council was elected in 2015 and did not face re-election in 2019, and the members elected in 2019 will not face re-election until 2027. The President was John Ajaka until March 2021 and then Matthew Mason-Cox from May 2021.

Name	Party	End term	Years in office
John Ajaka (Note: On 31 March 2021, Liberal MLC John Ajaka resigned. Peter Poulos was appointed to fill the vacancy on 6 May 2021.)	Liberal	2023	2007–2021
Lou Amato	Liberal	2023	2015–2023
Mark Banasiak	Shooters, Fishers, Farmers	2027	2019–present
Scott Barrett (Note: On 6 January 2022, Nationals MLC Trevor Khan resigned. Scott Barrett was appointed to replace him on 24 February 2022.)	National	2023	2022–2023
Niall Blair (Note: On 16 October 2019, Nationals MLC Niall Blair resigned. Sam Farraway was appointed to fill the vacancy on 17 October 2019.)	National	2027	2011–2019
Robert Borsak	Shooters, Fishers, Farmers	2023	2010–present
Abigail Boyd	Greens	2027	2019–present
Mark Buttigieg	Labor	2027	2019–present
Catherine Cusack (Note: On 9 August 2022, Liberal MLC Catherine Cusack resigned. Aileen MacDonald was appointed to replace her on 10 August 2022.)	Liberal	2027	2003–2022
Anthony D'Adam	Labor	2027	2019–present
Greg Donnelly	Labor	2027	2005–present
Cate Faehrmann	Greens	2023	2010–2013, 2018–present
Wes Fang	National	2027	2017–present
Scott Farlow	Liberal	2023	2015-2023, 2023–present
Sam Farraway	National	2027	2019–present
Justin Field (Note: Greens MLC Justin Field resigned from the party on 3 April 2019 to sit as an independent.)	Independent	2023	2016–2023
Ben Franklin (Note: Two seats were vacant at the beginning of this parliament, following the resignations of Labor MLC Lynda Voltz and National MLC Ben Franklin to run for the Legislative Assembly. On 8 May 2019, Franklin (who was unsuccessful in the Legislative Assembly) was appointed to fill his own vacancy, while Rose Jackson was appointed to fill Voltz's seat.)	National	2023	2015–2019, 2019–present
John Graham	Labor	2023	2016–present
Don Harwin (Note: On 22 March 2022, Liberal MLC Don Harwin resigned. Chris Rath was appointed to replace him on 24 March 2022.)	Liberal	2023	1999–2022
Sue Higginson (Note: On 11 April 2022, Greens MLC David Shoebridge resigned to contest the 2022 federal election. Sue Higginson was appointed to replace him on 12 May 2022.)	Greens	2027	2022–present
Courtney Houssos	Labor	2023	2015–present
Emma Hurst	Animal Justice	2027	2019–present
Rose Jackson	Labor	2023	2019–present
Trevor Khan	National	2023	2007–2022
Mark Latham	One Nation	2027	2019–2023, 2023–present
Aileen MacDonald	Liberal	2027	2022-present
Natasha Maclaren-Jones	Liberal	2027	2011-2023, 2023–present
Shayne Mallard	Liberal	2023	2015–2023
Taylor Martin	Liberal	2027	2017–present
Matthew Mason-Cox	Liberal / Independent (Note: On 5 May 2021, Matthew Mason-Cox was expelled from the Liberals for nominating for President in opposition to the Coalition nomination of Natasha Maclaren-Jones, winning with support from opposition and crossbench MLCs. His party membership was reinstated two weeks later.)	2023	2006–2023
Sarah Mitchell	National	2027	2011–present
Daniel Mookhey	Labor	2027	2015–present
Tara Moriarty	Labor	2027	2019–present
Shaoquett Moselmane	Labor	2023	2009–2023
Fred Nile	Christian Democrats / Independent (Note: On 29 March 2022, the Christian Democratic Party was dissolved.)	2023	1981–2004, 2004–2023
Mark Pearson	Animal Justice	2023	2015–2023
Peter Poulos	Liberal	2023	2021–2023
Peter Primrose	Labor	2027	1996–present
Chris Rath	Liberal	2023	2022–present
Rod Roberts	One Nation	2027	2019–present
Adam Searle	Labor	2023	2011–2023
Walt Secord	Labor	2023	2011–2023
Penny Sharpe	Labor	2027	2005–2015, 2015–present
David Shoebridge	Greens	2027	2010–2022
Bronnie Taylor	National	2023	2015–present
Damien Tudehope	Liberal	2027	2019–present
Mick Veitch	Labor	2023	2007–2023
Natalie Ward	Liberal	2027	2017–present
