= Members of the New South Wales Legislative Council, 2011–2015 =

Members of the New South Wales Legislative Council, 2011–2015

Members of the New South Wales Legislative Council who served in the 55th Parliament were elected at the 2007 and 2011 elections. As members serve eight-year terms, half of the Council was elected in 2007 and did not face re-election in 2011, and the members elected in 2011 did not face re-election until 2019. The President was Don Harwin.

Name	Party	End term	Years in office
John Ajaka	Liberal	2015	2007–2021
Jan Barham	Greens	2019	2011–2017
Niall Blair	National	2019	2011–2019
Robert Borsak	Shooters and Fishers	2015	2010–present
Robert Brown	Shooters and Fishers	2019	2006–2019
Jeremy Buckingham	Greens	2019	2011–2019, 2023–present
David Clarke	Liberal	2019	2003–2019
Rick Colless	National	2019	2000–2019
Sophie Cotsis	Labor	2015	2010–2016
Catherine Cusack	Liberal	2019	2003–2022
Greg Donnelly	Labor	2019	2005–present
Cate Faehrmann (Note: Cate Faehrmann resigned on 18 June 2013, to contest the Senate in the 2013 Federal election. Mehreen Faruqi was appointed to the vacancy on 19 June 2013.)	Greens	2015	2011–2013, 2018–present
Mehreen Faruqi	Greens	2015	2013–2018
Amanda Fazio	Labor	2015	2000–2015
Marie Ficarra (Note: Marie Ficarra withdrew from the parliamentary Liberal party in April 2014, to serve as an Independent, following her implication in corruption allegations investigated by the Independent Commission Against Corruption (ICAC).)	Liberal / Independent	2015	2007–2015
Luke Foley	Labor	2015	2010–2015
Mike Gallacher (Note: Mike Gallacher withdrew from the parliamentary Liberal party in May 2014, to serve as an Independent, following his implication in corruption allegations investigated by ICAC.)	Liberal / Independent	2019	1996–2017
Jenny Gardiner	National	2015	1991–2015
Duncan Gay	National	2019	1988–2017
Paul Green	Christian Democrats	2019	2011–2019
Don Harwin	Liberal	2015	1999–2022
John Hatzistergos (Note: Labor MLC John Hatzistergos resigned on 19 May 2011. Adam Searle was appointed to the vacancy on 20 May.)	Labor	2015	1999–2011
John Kaye	Greens	2015	2007–2016
Tony Kelly (Note: Labor MLC Tony Kelly resigned on 6 June 2011. Steve Whan was appointed to the vacancy on 20 June.)	Labor	2019	1987–1988, 1997–2011
Trevor Khan	National	2015	2007–2022
Charlie Lynn	Liberal	2015	1995–2015
Scot MacDonald	Liberal	2019	2011–2019
Natasha Maclaren-Jones	Liberal	2019	2011-2023, 2023–present
Matthew Mason-Cox	Liberal	2015	2006–2023
Sarah Mitchell	National	2019	2011–present
Shaoquett Moselmane	Labor	2015	2009–2023
Fred Nile	Christian Democrats	2015	1981–2004, 2004–present
Eddie Obeid (Note: Labor MLC Eddie Obeid resigned on 10 May 2011. Walt Secord was appointed to the vacancy on 20 May.)	Labor	2015	1991–2011
Melinda Pavey	National	2015	2002–2015
Greg Pearce	Liberal	2019	2000–2017
Peter Phelps	Liberal	2019	2011–2019
Peter Primrose	Labor	2019	1996–present
Eric Roozendaal (Note: Eric Roozendaal had been appointed in 2004 as a member of the Labor Party. In November 2012, Roozendaal was suspended from the party and sat as an Independent. He resigned from the Council on 9 May 2013, and Ernest Wong was appointed to fill the vacancy on 24 May 2013.)	Labor / Independent	2019	2004–2013
Adam Searle	Labor	2015	2011–2023
Walt Secord	Labor	2015	2011–2023
Penny Sharpe	Labor	2019	2005–2015, 2015–present
David Shoebridge	Greens	2019	2010–2022
Mick Veitch	Labor	2015	2007–2023
Lynda Voltz	Labor	2015	2007–2019
Helen Westwood	Labor	2015	2007–2015
Steve Whan	Labor	2019	2011–2015
Ernest Wong	Labor	2019	2013–2019
