= Members of the New South Wales Legislative Council, 2015–2019 =

Members of the New South Wales Legislative Council, 2015–2019

Members of the New South Wales Legislative Council who served in the 56th Parliament were elected at the 2011 and 2015 elections. As members serve eight-year terms, half of the Council was elected in 2011 and did not face re-election in 2015, and the members elected in 2015 will not face re-election until 2023. The President was Don Harwin until 30 January 2017 and then John Ajaka.

Name	Party	End term	Years in office
John Ajaka	Liberal	2023	2007–2021
Lou Amato	Liberal	2023	2015–2023
Jan Barham (Note: On 13 February 2017, Greens MLC Jan Barham resigned. Dawn Walker was appointed to fill the resulting casual vacancy on 22 February 2017.)	Greens	2019	2011–2017
Niall Blair	National	2019	2011–2019
Robert Borsak	Shooters and Fishers	2023	2010–present
Robert Brown	Shooters and Fishers	2019	2006–2019
Jeremy Buckingham (Note: Jeremy Buckingham resigned from the Greens to sit as an independent on 20 December 2018.)	Greens / Independent	2019	2011–2019, 2023–present
David Clarke	Liberal	2019	2003–2019
Rick Colless	National	2019	2000–2019
Sophie Cotsis (Note: On 16 September 2016, Labor MLC Sophie Cotsis resigned in order to contest the Canterbury by-election. John Graham was appointed to fill the resulting casual vacancy on 12 October 2016.)	Labor	2023	2010–2016
Catherine Cusack	Liberal	2019	2003–2022
Greg Donnelly	Labor	2019	2005–present
Cate Faehrmann (Note: On 14 August 2018, Greens MLC Mehreen Faruqi resigned. Cate Faehrmann was appointed to fill the resulting casual vacancy on 15 August 2018)	Greens	2023	2010–2013, 2018–present
Wes Fang (Note: On 31 July 2017, National MLC Duncan Gay resigned. Wes Fang was appointed to fill the resulting casual vacancy on 9 August 2017.)	National	2019	2017–present
Scott Farlow	Liberal	2023	2015-2023, 2023–present
Mehreen Faruqi	Greens	2023	2013–2018
Justin Field (Note: On 2 May 2016, Greens MLC John Kaye died. Justin Field was appointed to fill the resulting casual vacancy on 23 August 2016.)	Greens	2023	2016-2023
Ben Franklin (Note: Labor MLC Lynda Voltz and Nationals MLC Ben Franklin resigned to run for the Legislative Assembly.)	National	2023	2015–2019, 2019–present
Mike Gallacher (Note: Mike Gallacher had resigned from the Liberals in 2014 and sat as an Independent. On 6 April 2017 Gallacher resigned from parliament. Liberal Taylor Martin was appointed to fill the resulting casual vacancy on 3 May 2017.)	Liberal / Independent	2019	1996–2017
Duncan Gay	National	2019	1988–2017
John Graham	Labor	2023	2016–present
Paul Green	Christian Democrats	2019	2011–2019
Don Harwin	Liberal	2023	1999–2022
Courtney Houssos	Labor	2023	2015–present
John Kaye	Greens	2023	2007–2016
Trevor Khan	National	2023	2007–2022
Scot MacDonald	Liberal	2019	2011–2019
Natasha Maclaren-Jones	Liberal	2019	2011-2023, 2023–present
Shayne Mallard	Liberal	2023	2015–2023
Taylor Martin	Liberal	2019	2017–present
Matthew Mason-Cox	Liberal	2023	2006–2023
Sarah Mitchell	National	2019	2011–present
Daniel Mookhey (Note: On 6 May 2015, Daniel Mookhey was appointed to fill the vacancy caused by Steve Whan's resignation during the last parliament. On the same day, Penny Sharpe was appointed to fill the vacancy caused by her own resignation under similar circumstances.)	Labor	2019	2015–present
Shaoquett Moselmane	Labor	2023	2009–2023
Fred Nile	Christian Democrats	2023	1981–2004, 2004–present
Greg Pearce (Note: On 15 November 2017, Liberal MLC Greg Pearce resigned. Natalie Ward was appointed to fill the resulting casual vacancy on 16 November 2017.)	Liberal	2019	2000–2017
Mark Pearson	Animal Justice	2023	2015–2023
Peter Phelps	Liberal	2019	2011–2019
Peter Primrose	Labor	2019	1996–present
Adam Searle	Labor	2023	2011–2023
Walt Secord	Labor	2023	2011–2023
Penny Sharpe	Labor	2019	2005–2015, 2015–present
David Shoebridge	Greens	2019	2010–2022
Bronnie Taylor	National	2023	2015–present
Mick Veitch	Labor	2023	2007–2023
Lynda Voltz	Labor	2023	2007–2019
Dawn Walker	Greens	2019	2017–2019
Natalie Ward	Liberal	2019	2017–present
Ernest Wong	Labor	2019	2013–2019
