= BGHS =

BGHS may refer to:

Australia

- Bankstown Girls High School, Bankstown, New South Wales
- Birrong Girls High School, Birrong, New South Wales
- Burwood Girls High School, Croydon, New South Wales

India

- Baldwin Girls High School, Bangalore
- Ballygunge Government High School, Kolkata

United States

- Barbara Goleman High School, Miami Lakes, Florida
- Barry Goldwater High School, Phoenix, Arizona
- Beech Grove High School, Beech Grove, Indiana
- Bell Gardens High School, Bell Gardens, California
- Bishop Garrigan High School, Algona, Iowa
- Bishop Gorman High School, Summerlin, Nevada
- Bishop Guertin High School, Nashua, New Hampshire
- Bishop Guilfoyle High School, Altoona, Pennsylvania
- Bolsa Grande High School, Garden Grove, California
- Boone Grove High School, Valparaiso, Indiana
- Bowling Green High School (Kentucky), Bowling Green, Kentucky
- Bowling Green High School (Ohio), Bowling Green, Ohio
- Buffalo Gap High School, Swoope, Virginia
- Buffalo Grove High School, Buffalo Grove, Illinois
