= Jeremy Buckingham =

Australian politician (born 1973)

The Honourable Jeremy Buckingham MLC
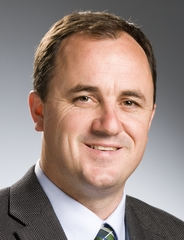
- Buckingham in 2023

Member of the New South Wales Legislative Council
- Incumbent
- Assumed office 20 April 2023
- Preceded by: Mark Pearson
- In office 26 March 2011 – 23 March 2019
- Preceded by: John Robertson
- Succeeded by: Emma Hurst

Councillor of the City of Orange
- In office 27 March 2004 – 8 September 2012
- Mayor: John Davis; Reginald Kidd

Personal details
- Born: 22 November 1973 (age 52) Launceston, Tasmania, Australia
- Party: Legalise Cannabis (2022–present)
- Other political affiliations: Independent (2018–2022); Greens (until 2018)
- Website: Jeremy Buckingham MLC

Jeremy Buckingham (born 22 November 1973) is an Australian politician who has served as a member of the New South Wales Legislative Council since 2023, having previously held the same office from 2011 until 2019.

Buckingham was a member of the Greens until he resigned from the party in 2018. He returned to parliament at the 2023 election as a member of the Legalise Cannabis Party.

== Early life and education ==
Buckingham was born in Launceston, Tasmania and spent his early life living in the historic homestead 'Hillgrove', adjacent to the Taroona Shot Tower site south of Hobart. Growing up in this historic setting, he developed a strong sense of place and history, which later influenced his commitment to preserving the environment and cultural heritage. He attended Taroona Primary, Taroona High School and graduated from The Hobart College.

== Early career and personal interests ==
After school he spent two years working as a benchman in a small country sawmill run by Kim Booth (later a Greens member of the Tasmanian House of Assembly) in central Tasmania.

In 1994, Buckingham fronted heavy metal band Amplifire as singer, with other band members including his brother Jessie 'Tambo' Buckingham, as well as Michael Kelly, Brett Collidge and John Salter.

== Move to NSW and early employment ==
Buckingham moved to Sydney in the mid 1990s, where he worked as forklift driver, hardware store salesman and builders' labourer.

Buckingham relocated to Orange in the central west of New South Wales in 1997, where he worked as production manager for monumental stonemason McMurtrie & Co. In his time at the stonemason, Buckingham worked on public works such as the Australian War Memorial in London, the Federation Square project and the Sydney Olympic Games site.

== Transition to politics ==
After a back injury rendered him unfit for heavy lifting, Buckingham enrolled and completed an Advanced Diploma in Ecological Agriculture and Land Management at the University of Sydney, which he completed in 2006. He continued to work as a stonemason until his election to state parliament in 2011.

Buckingham was married to Sarah Bradbury from 2000 until 2017. In 2020, Buckingham married Crystal Buckingham.

== Political career ==
=== Greens ===
Buckingham unsuccessfully contested the state Legislative Assembly seat of Orange in the 2003 and 2007 state elections. Buckingham was elected to the City of Orange council in 2004 and re-elected with an increased vote in 2008. He was the first member of the Australian Greens elected to a council west of the Great Dividing Range. As a councillor, he implemented Australia's first stormwater harvesting project for drinking water supply, initiated the city's first statement of commitment to the Aboriginal community, fought against homophobia and for the rights of same sex couples, campaigned to protect an agricultural research station from developers, and fought to protect water supplies from the Cadia gold mine that operates on the outskirts of Orange.

Buckingham was elected convenor of the Central West Greens in 2008, a position which he held until 2011.

Buckingham was the sixth candidate on the Greens' Senate ticket for the 2004 Australian federal election. He contested the lower house seat of Calare in the 2007 and 2010 federal elections without success. Buckingham was then preselected to third spot on the Greens' Legislative Council ticket in the 2011 state election. He was locked in a close race with Pauline Hanson and the Nationals for the final spots. After preferences were distributed he was elected with 2,437 votes ahead of Pauline Hanson, and 1,306 votes ahead of Sarah Johnston of the National Party.

After being elected, Buckingham campaigned against the expansion of the coal and coal seam gas (CSG) industries in New South Wales and Australia. He has managed to build broad links across both sides of politics in the CSG campaign, and has made a personal ally of conservative radio show host Alan Jones who alongside Buckingham was sued by the former leader of the National Party (Andrew Stoner) for defamation.

Buckingham initiated Australia's first parliamentary inquiry into coal seam gas. Buckingham introduced bills into the NSW Parliament attempting to restrict mining. The "Coal Seam Gas Moratorium Bill 2011" sought a moratorium on the granting of exploration licences for coal seam gas. The "Responsible Mining (Protecting Land, Water and Communities) Bill 2012" seeking to prohibit exploration and mining of minerals and petroleum in urban areas, National Parks, and drinking water catchments.

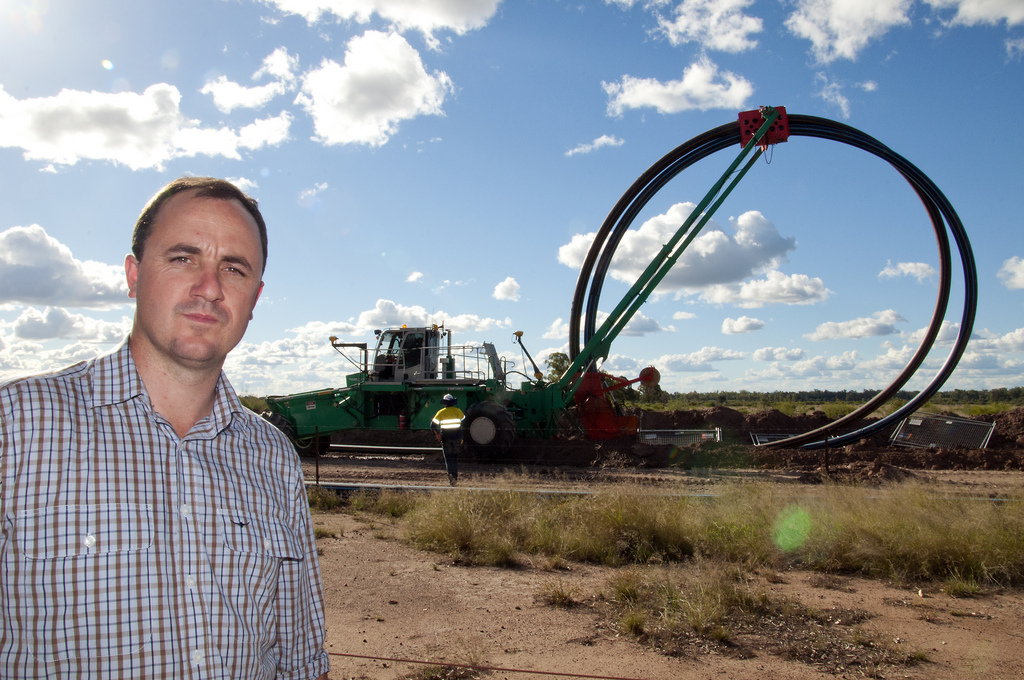
Jeremy Buckingham & CSG pipe layer

For the Greens, he held the portfolios of Mining and Resources, Primary Industries, Trade and Investment, Regional Infrastructure and Services, Agriculture, Health and Sport.

Alongside former Greens leader Christine Milne, Buckingham had set up a country arm of the Greens party and was convenor of the Australian Country Greens.

In October 2016, Buckingham tabled a motion in response to U.S. presidential candidate Donald Trump's recently leaked statements. This included the phrase stating the NSW parliament "agrees with those who have described Mr Trump as 'a revolting slug' unfit for public office". The president of the upper house, Don Harwin, found the term "revolting slug" was not unparliamentary language. The motion was passed.

In November 2018, Greens MP Jenny Leong used parliamentary privilege to accuse Jeremy Buckingham of sexual violence toward a staff member whose job he then allegedly threatened, and following this the Greens NSW State Delegates Council passed a motion calling for Buckingham to resign due to violations of their sexual harassment policy. In retaliation Buckingham threatened other party members and candidates with defamation proceedings if they supported the former staff member.

=== Independent ===
In December 2018, Buckingham resigned from the Greens NSW. His resignation followed a motion passed by more than three quarters of the Greens' branches asking that he step down from the 2019 election ticket following an allegation of sexual assault and other claims of internal bullying. Buckingham claimed that the allegations had seen party processes "abused and co-opted for factional purposes" and that the allegations had not been substantiated.

Buckingham described the party as "toxic", and said the NSW Greens had "abandoned the core principles they were founded on" and were more focused on "bringing down capitalism" and "divisive identity politics" than acting on climate change. He said that as an independent, he would run on a “real green” platform to “challenge the party’s Marxist agenda”.

Buckingham contested the 2019 election as an independent in Legislative Council. He ran on a platform of climate action and pressuring the market on gas. He also said he would team up with an independent candidate who would run against Jenny Leong in the lower house seat of Newtown.

Buckingham was unsuccessful in retaining his seat at the 2019 election.

=== Legalise Cannabis Party ===
In February 2023, the Legalise Cannabis Party announced that Buckingham would lead its Legislative Council ticket for the 2023 NSW Election. He was successful in being elected in eighteenth place out of twenty-one successful candidates. As he introduced a Bill to legalise homegrown cannabis, he became the first politician in Australian history to produce a bud of cannabis during a parliamentary session.

In October 2023, following lobbying by Buckingham, the New South Wales government announced an overhaul of the state's drug laws, including pre-court diversion for those caught with small quantities of illicit drugs including cannabis, cocaine, MDMA and methamphetimine.

In June 2024, he was named the chair of the Joint Standing Committee on Net Zero Future.

=== Inquiry into the regulatory framework for cannabis in New South Wales ===
On 20 March 2024, the NSW Legislative Council’s Portfolio Committee No. 1 – Premier and Finance was referred an inquiry entitled Impact of the regulatory framework for cannabis in New South Wales, with Jeremy Buckingham (Legalise Cannabis Party) appointed as Chair. The inquiry examined the historical development and implementation of cannabis regulation; socioeconomic and financial costs of prohibition; impacts on young people, public health, road safety, crime, and justice; effects on Aboriginal, LGBTIQA+, regional, multicultural, and low-income communities; alternative regulatory models; and the Drug Misuse and Trafficking Amendment (Regulation of Personal Adult Use of Cannabis) Bill 2023.

The Committee’s First Report was tabled on 31 October 2024, advocating a staged reform process—starting with de-escalating criminal penalties through expiation schemes and non-enforcement trials, accompanied by evaluation and a government response.

The Final Report, delivered on 20 June 2025, concluded that current cannabis regulation is unjust and ineffective, favouring those who can obtain prescriptions, while penalising others. It recommended immediate abolition of custodial sentences for minor possession and outlined a stepwise transition to decriminalisation and legal, regulated access.

Public hearings were livestreamed; video recordings are publicly accessible via the NSW Parliament’s official YouTube channel.

=== Hemp Industry Taskforce ===
In February 2024, the New South Wales Government announced the creation of the Hemp Industry Taskforce to support the expansion of the industrial hemp sector in the state. The twelve-member taskforce, comprising representatives from growers and industry associations, was tasked with identifying short-, medium- and long-term objectives for the industry, including assessing the role of industrial hemp in the transition to a net zero, circular economy; examining supply and value chains and barriers to production; identifying legislative barriers and opportunities for expansion; and considering options for harmonising industrial hemp regulation nationally.

The announcement followed the NSW Hemp Industry Roundtable in 2023, which Buckingham convened and hosted at the NSW Parliament, and which was attended by Minister for Agriculture Tara Moriarty. According to the Minister, the roundtable provided "an important opportunity to hear from hemp industry stakeholders" and contributed to the Government’s understanding of the sector’s potential.

Buckingham welcomed the creation of the taskforce, stating: "The establishment of this taskforce is a game-changer for an industry that promises massive potential for jobs and farming in NSW. This is a plant which is up to 25 times more effective at capturing carbon than forestry, and which offers almost unlimited potential in a wide range of areas including clothing, construction, foodstuffs, paper, medication and more."

== See also ==
- Members of the New South Wales Legislative Council, 2011–2015
- Members of the New South Wales Legislative Council, 2015–2019
