= Birrong Girls High School =

Location
- Cooper Road, Birrong, New South Wales; Australia; 33°53′23.37″S 151°1′35.14″E

Information
- Type: Government-funded single-sex comprehensive secondary day school
- Established: 29 January 1957; 69 years ago (as Birrong Home Science School)
- School district: Chullora; Metropolitan South
- Educational authority: New South Wales Department of Education
- Oversight: NSW Education Standards Authority
- Principal: Zena Dabaja
- Teaching staff: 55.4 FTE (2018)
- Years: 7–12
- Gender: Girls
- Enrolment: 786 (2018)
- Campus type: Suburban
- Website: birronggir-h.schools.nsw.gov.au

Birrong Girls High School is a government-funded single-sex comprehensive secondary day school for girls, located on Cooper Road, Birrong, a western suburb of Sydney, in New South Wales, Australia.

Established in 1957, the school enrolled approximately 790 students in 2018, from Year 7 to Year 12, of whom one percent identified as Indigenous Australians and 94 percent were from a language background other than English. The school is operated by the NSW Department of Education in accordance with a curriculum developed by the New South Wales Education Standards Authority; the principal is Zena Dabaja.

== Overview ==
The school was established on 29 January 1957 as Birrong Home Science School. It was officially reopened as a multi-lateral high school, with the new name Birrong Girls High School, on 25 September 1959.

Amongst its students there is a diverse range of cultural backgrounds representing 46 language groups, the majority of whom are from Arabic, Vietnamese, Chinese and Turkish backgrounds.

== Notable alumni ==
- Lynda Voltz – politician
- Helen Westwood – politician

== See also ==
- List of government schools in New South Wales: A–F
- Education in Australia
