= Peter Poulos (politician) =

Australian politician

Member of the New South Wales Legislative Council
- In office 6 May 2021 – 3 March 2023
- Preceded by: John Ajaka

Personal details
- Party: Liberal Party
- Spouse: Vicki Poulos
- Children: 3
- Profession: Politician

Peter John Poulos is an Australian politician. He was a Liberal member of the New South Wales Legislative Council from May 2021, when he was appointed to replace John Ajaka, until the 2023 election.

Poulos was born to Greek-born parents and grew up in Bardwell Park. He was educated at Bexley North Public School and Sydney Technical High School before attending the University of New South Wales, where he studied for a Bachelor of Commerce. He served on Rockdale City Council from 2004 to 2016; his wife Vicki served on Bayside Council from 2017 to 2021.

Poulos joined the Liberal Party in 1993. He served on the party's state executive from 2008 to 2012 and worked for a number of Liberal politicians, including Senator Concetta Fierravanti-Wells and state Environment Minister Matt Kean. In 2019, he contested the Liberal preselection for the NSW Legislative Assembly district of Hawkesbury, but lost to Robyn Preston. In 2021, he was selected by the Liberal Party to fill the Legislative Council vacancy arising from the resignation of John Ajaka, the outgoing President, defeating three other candidates.

In the lead-up to the 2023 New South Wales state election, Poulos was criticised because in 2018 (when he was a political staffer), he had shared an email containing explicit photos of Robyn Preston from a photo shoot for Penthouse Magazine she had done when she was 22 and published in 1980. She was seeking Liberal preselection for the lower house seat of Hawkesbury at the time. She won preselection and the ensuing election.

The NSW Liberal Party subsequently suspended Poulos for six months and he was disendorsed from his winnable spot on the upper house ticket at the 2023 state election.
