= Roy Smith (Australian politician) =

Australian politician

Roy Anthony Smith (1953/54 – 31 July 2010) was an Australian politician, and a former manager of the New South Wales Sporting Shooters Association of Australia. He was a member of the Shooters Party, and at the 2007 state election was elected to the New South Wales Legislative Council. Prior to entering politics, he worked as an electrical fitter. He attended Benedict College (Trinity Catholic College) in Sydney.

On 31 July 2010, Smith died in his sleep at his home in Werrington in Sydney's west, at age 56.
