= Tony Catanzariti =

Australian politician

Member of Legislative Council of New South Wales
- In office 22 March 2003 – 4 March 2011

Personal details
- Born: 17 September 1949 (age 77) Platì, Calabria, Italy
- Party: Labor Party
- Spouse: Mary Catanzariti
- Children: 3 (m), 1 (f)
- Occupation: Orchardist

Antonio (Tony) Catanzariti (born 17 September 1949) is a former Australian politician and a citrus farmer. Catanzariti represented the Labor Party in the New South Wales Legislative Council from the 2003 election until his retirement in 2011. On 31 January 2011, Catanzariti announced he would not recontest the next state election because he wanted to devote more time to his farming interests and family.

Catanzariti was born in Platì in Calabria, southern Italy. His father left Italy for Australia in late 1949 with the hope of finding work and stability to raise his family. His father first went to Adelaide and later moved to Griffith, New South Wales. His mother migrated to Australia when Catanzariti was just one year old and arrived in Griffith in September 1950.

Catanzariti joined the Labor party in 1969 and held a number of party positions prior to his election to the Legislative Council in 2003. He also served as a board member at Murrumbidgee Electricity and the Sydney Market Authority; and as a councillor at Griffith City Council.

During the 2007 election campaign, the opposition National Party accused Catanzariti of offering to fund independent candidate Mike Neville's campaign for the Nationals-held seat of Murrumbidgee. Catanzariti admitted he had suggested Neville stand for the seat, but denied that funding had been offered or provided. Neville was easily defeated in Murrumbidgee by sitting Nationals MP Adrian Piccoli.

Catanzariti is married to Mary Catanzariti and together they have three sons and one daughter.
