= Lynda Voltz =

Australian politician (born 1965)

Lynda Voltz MP

Member of the New South Wales Legislative Assembly for Auburn
- Incumbent
- Assumed office 23 March 2019
- Preceded by: Luke Foley

Member of the Legislative Council of New South Wales
- In office 24 March 2007 – 28 February 2019
- Succeeded by: Rose Jackson

Personal details
- Born: 1965 (age 60–61) Hornsby, New South Wales, Australia
- Party: Labor Party
- Children: Two
- Education: Birrong Girls High School
- Occupation: Soldier, clinical counsellor, political staffer

Military service
- Allegiance: Australia
- Branch/service: Australian Army
- Years of service: 1987–1993
- Unit: Royal Australian Corps of Military Police

Lynda Jane Voltz (born 1965) is an Australian politician. She is a Labor Party member of the New South Wales Legislative Assembly, representing Auburn since 2019.

== Career ==
Voltz joined the Australian Army Reserve in 1984, and in 1987 she became one of the first women to the join the regular Australian Army as one of the second group of women to train alongside men at Army Recruit Training Centre at Kapooka. She joined the Royal Australian Corps of Military Police, as it was one of the few field force units women were allowed to join.

After leaving the army, she worked as a political staffer for state MP Sandra Nori, federal member for Sydney Peter Baldwin, and then as an electoral officer for Senator John Faulkner. At the 1995 New South Wales state election, she contested the district of North Shore but was defeated by the Liberal candidate, Jillian Skinner. Voltz was elected as a member of the New South Wales Legislative Council in 2007 and re-elected in 2015. In 2016, Voltz replaced Guy Zangari as Shadow Minister for Sport and Veterans' Affairs in the shadow Ministry of Luke Foley, a position she retained in the shadow Ministry of Michael Daley.

Voltz resigned from the Legislative Council in February 2019 to contest the Legislative Assembly district of Auburn following the vacation of that seat by Luke Foley. Voltz was elected to the Assembly and appointed as Shadow Minister for Police and Counter Terrorism and Shadow Minister for Sport and Recreation in the shadow Ministry of Jodi McKay She retained these positions until the constitution of the shadow Ministry of Chris Minns, to which she was not appointed.

In October 2023, Murphy signed an open letter which condemned attacks against Israeli and Palestinian civilians during the Gaza war. In August 2025, Voltz attended the March for Humanity in Sydney, a large protest highlighting the plight of Palestinians in the Gaza conflict.

== Personal life ==
Voltz was born in Hornsby on Sydney's North Shore, and attended Birrong Girls High School. She has two daughters, Katerina and Anastasia.

New South Wales Legislative Assembly
Preceded by Luke Foley	Member for Auburn; 2019–present	Incumbent
