= Greg Donnelly =

Australian politician

The Honourable Greg Donnelly MLC

Member of the New South Wales Legislative Council
- In office 23 February 2005 – 2026
- Preceded by: Michael Egan
- Succeeded by: Bernard Govind

Personal details
- Party: Labor Party
- Spouse: Gaynor
- Children: 3

Gregory John Donnelly is an Australian politician, a member of the New South Wales Legislative Council from 2005 until 2026, representing the Labor Party.

== Background and early career ==
Donnelly was educated at Mandurah Primary, Christian Brothers College in Fremantle, and University of Western Australia studying industrial relations and economics. He became an official of Shop, Distributive and Allied Employees' Association in 1986, and was promoted to branch secretary. Donnelly is Catholic and has been outspoken about matters associated with his faith.

== Political career ==
Donnelly was appointed to a casual vacancy caused by the resignation of Treasurer Michael Egan and currently serves on several parliamentary committees.

Donnelly has written opinion pieces criticising the representation of women in advertising, a proposal for same sex couples to adopt in NSW and has spoken in NSW Parliament about his opposition to pornography, and has opposed a marriage equality bill put by the NSW Greens.

In November 2016, Donnelly wrote an opinion piece opposing the Safe Schools program.

In May 2017, Donnelly was one of three Labor MPs to vote with the Liberal Party and National Party to block a bill to decriminalise abortion in the state.

In June 2023, Donnelly attended and spoke at a pro-women event in NSW Parliament called "Why Can't Women Talk About Sex", attended by figures like Moira Deeming and One Nation MP Tania Mihailuk. He declared that "there will be a reckoning taking place", and expressed regret that more of his Labor colleagues did not attend. He has faced criticism online, and from the Greens, for his attendance, however, he has received no official condemnation from NSW Labor.
