= Results of the 1981 New South Wales Legislative Council election =

Legislative Council election for New South Wales, Australia in March 1981

New South Wales state election, 19 September 1981 Legislative Council
Enrolled voters	3,212,657				
Votes cast	2,927,971		Turnout	91.14	–1.63
Informal votes	200,367		Informal	6.84	+2.79
Summary of votes by party
Party	Primary votes	%	Swing	Seats won	Seats held
Labor	1,412,426	51.78	–3.13	8	24
Liberal/National Coalition	921,081	33.77	–2.49	5	18
Call to Australia	248,425	9.11	+7.80	1	1
Democrats	109,939	4.03	+1.25	1	1
Environmental Action	18,056	0.66	+0.66	0	0
Republican	10,184	0.37	+0.37	0	0
Progress	3,121	0.11	+0.11	0	0
Social Democrats	2,512	0.09	+0.09	0	0
Independent	24,786	0.07	–0.83	0	0
Total	2,727,604			15	

This is a list of results for the Legislative Council at the 1981 New South Wales state election.

The Call to Australia (subsequently Christian Democratic Party) would win its first seat in the Legislative Council. The party would win a seat at every election until 2019.

== Results ==
1981 New South Wales state election: Legislative Council
Party	Candidate	Votes	%	±%
Quota		170,476		
Labor	1. Paul Landa (elected 1); 2. Jack Hallam (elected 4); 3. Jack Garland (elected 6); 4. Barney French (elected 8); 5. Franca Arena (elected 10); 6. George Brenner (elected 12); 7. Ken Reed (elected 13); 8. Bryan Vaughan (elected 14); 9. Ann Symonds; 10. Fred Hankinson	1,412,426	51.8	−3.1
Liberal/National Coalition	1. Max Willis (elected 2); 2. Jack Doohan (elected 5); 3. Ted Pickering (elected 7); 4. John Matthews (elected 9); 5. Richard Killen (elected 11); 6. Derek Freeman; 7. Judy Jakins; 8. Bronwyn Bishop; 9. John Hagan; 10. Doug Moppett	921,081	33.8	−2.4
Call to Australia	1. Fred Nile (elected 3); 2. Graham McLennan; 3. Kevin Hume; 4. Thomas Toogood; 5. Percy Everingham	248,425	9.1	+9.1
Democrats	1. Elisabeth Kirkby (elected 15); 2. Paul McLean; 3. James Boow; 4. Christine Townend; 5. Laurence Bourke; 6. Ray Griffiths; 7. Ross McInnes; 8. Richard Beazley; 9. Joe Lake; 10. Elizabeth Poppleton	109,939	4.0	+1.2
Environmental Action	1. Keith Suter; 2. Dudley Leggett; 3. Jennifer Quealy; 4. Quentin Jacobsen	18,056	0.7	+0.7
Republican	1. Brian Buckley; 2. Marie McKern	10,184	0.4	+0.4
Progress	1. Henry Soper; 2. Marjorie Wisby; 3. William More	3,121	0.1	+0.1
Social Democrats	1. Walter Roach; 2. Johann Liszikam	2,152	0.1	+0.1
Independent	Louis Patmoy	994	0.04	+0.04
Independent	Rudolph Dezelin	866	0.03	0.00
Total formal votes		2,727,604	93.2	−2.8
Informal votes		200,367	6.8	+2.8
Turnout		2,927,971	91.1	−1.6

== Continuing members ==
The following MLCs were not up for re-election this year.

Member	Party	Term
Roy Turner	Labor	1976–1984
Peter Baldwin	Labor	1976–1982
Don Burton	Labor	1976–1984
John Morris	Labor	1976–1984
Delcia Kite	Labor	1976–1984
Johno Johnson	Labor	1976–1984
Clive Healey	Labor	1978–1988
Joe Thompson	Labor	1978–1988
Peter Watkins	Labor	1978–1988
Barrie Unsworth	Labor	1978–1986
Dorothy Isaksen	Labor	1978–1988
Marie Fisher	Labor	1978–1988
Norm King	Labor	1978–1988
Deirdre Grusovin	Labor	1978–1988
Jim Kaldis	Labor	1978–1988
Ron Dyer	Labor	1979–1984
Fred Duncan	Liberal	1976–1984
John Holt	Liberal	1976–1984
Bill Sandwith	Liberal	1976–1984
Nathanael Orr	Liberal	1976–1984
Virginia Chadwick	Liberal	1978–1988
Frank Calabro	Liberal	1978–1988
Lloyd Lange	Liberal	1978–1986
Peter Philips	Liberal	1978–1988
Derek Freeman*	Liberal	1981–1984
Adrian Solomons	National Country	1976–1984
Bill Kennedy	National Country	1976–1984
Bob Rowland Smith	National Country	1978–1988
Toby MacDiarmid	National Country	1978–1988

- While Derek Freeman was not elected at the election, he was appointed as a casual vacancy following the death of Fergus Darling, whose term would have continued until 1984.

== See also ==
- Results of the 1981 New South Wales state election (Legislative Assembly)
- Candidates of the 1981 New South Wales state election
- Members of the New South Wales Legislative Council, 1981–1984
