= Members of the New South Wales Legislative Council, 1981–1984 =

Members of the New South Wales Legislative Council who served in the 47th Parliament were elected at the 1978 and 1981 elections. One third of the council faced re-election at each general election, however as a result of the 1981 referendum the maximum terms were extended from a maximum of nine to twelve years. The 14 members who had been indirectly elected in 1976 served an eight-year term and did not face re-election until 1984, the 15 members elected in 1978 did not face re-election until 1988, while the 15 members elected in 1981 did not face re-election until 1992. The President was Johno Johnson.

| Name | Party | End Term | Years in office |
|---|---|---|---|
| Franca Arena | Labor | 1992 | 1981–1999 |
| Peter Baldwin (Note: Labor MLC Peter Baldwin resigned on 18 August 1982 in order to contest the Australian House of Representatives seat of Sydney at the 1983 federal election. Ann Symonds was appointed to the resulting casual vacancy on 8 September.) | Labor | 1984 | 1976–1982 |
| George Brenner | Labor | 1992 | 1981–1991 |
| Don Burton | Labor | 1984 | 1976–1984 |
| Frank Calabro | Liberal | 1988 | 1970–1988 |
| Virginia Chadwick | Liberal | 1988 | 1978–1999 |
| Fergus Darling (Note: Liberal MLC Fergus Darling died on 3 October 1981. Former MLC Dr Derek Freeman was appointed to the resulting casual vacancy on 18 November.) | Liberal | 1984 | 1976–1981 |
| Jack Doohan | National | 1992 | 1978–1991 |
| Fred Duncan | Liberal | 1984 | 1972–1984 |
| Ron Dyer | Labor | 1984 | 1979–2003 |
| Marie Fisher | Labor | 1988 | 1978–1988 |
| Derek Freeman | Liberal | 1984 | 1973–1981, 1981–1984 |
| Barney French | Labor | 1992 | 1973–1991 |
| Jack Garland | Labor | 1992 | 1981–1990 |
| Deirdre Grusovin | Labor | 1988 | 1978–1990 |
| Jack Hallam | Labor | 1992 | 1973–1991 |
| Fred Hankinson (Note: Labor MLC Paul Landa resigned on 3 March 1984 in order to contest the Legislative Assembly seat of Peats at the 1984 state election. Fred Hankinson was appointed to the resulting casual vacancy on 28 March.) | Labor | 1992 | 1984–1991 |
| Clive Healey | Labor | 1988 | 1970–1988 |
| John Holt | Liberal | 1984 | 1972–1984 |
| Dorothy Isaksen | Labor | 1988 | 1978–1988, 1990–1999 |
| Johno Johnson | Labor | 1984 | 1976–2001 |
| Jim Kaldis | Labor | 1988 | 1978–1999 |
| Bill Kennedy | National | 1984 | 1971–1984 |
| Richard Killen | National | 1992 | 1981–1991 |
| Norm King | Labor | 1988 | 1978–1988 |
| Elisabeth Kirkby | Democrats | 1992 | 1981–1998 |
| Delcia Kite | Labor | 1984 | 1976–1995 |
| Paul Landa | Labor | 1992 | 1973–1984 |
| Lloyd Lange | Liberal | 1988 | 1974–1986 |
| Toby MacDiarmid | National | 1988 | 1973–1988 |
| John Matthews | Liberal | 1992 | 1981–1991 |
| John Morris | Labor | 1984 | 1976–1984 |
| Fred Nile | Call to Australia | 1992 | 1981–2004, 2004–present |
| Nathanael Orr | Liberal | 1984 | 1976–1984 |
| Peter Philips | Liberal | 1988 | 1976–1988 |
| Ted Pickering | Liberal | 1992 | 1976–1995 |
| Ken Reed | Labor | 1992 | 1981–1991 |
| Bob Rowland Smith | National | 1988 | 1974–1999 |
| Bill Sandwith | Liberal | 1984 | 1976–1984 |
| Sir Adrian Solomons | National | 1984 | 1969–1991 |
| Ann Symonds | Labor | 1984 | 1982–1998 |
| Joe Thompson | Labor | 1988 | 1974–1988 |
| Roy Turner | Labor | 1984 | 1975–1984 |
| Bryan Vaughan | Labor | 1992 | 1981–1999 |
| Barrie Unsworth | Labor | 1988 | 1978–1986 |
| Peter Watkins | Labor | 1988 | 1978–1987 |
| Max Willis | Liberal | 1992 | 1970–1999 |
