= Members of the New South Wales Legislative Council, 1978–1981 =

Members of the New South Wales Legislative Council from 1978 to 1981 held office following the 1978 referendum which reduced the number of members from 60 to 43, provided for the direct election of members of the Legislative Council and that members would serve for 3 terms of the Legislative Assembly. Only 15 of the 43 members had been elected at the 1978 Legislative Council election. Under the transitional arrangements, 28 members had been indirectly elected by joint sittings of the New South Wales Parliament, with 14 of those members to retire at the next general election, held in 1981, and the remaining 14 members would retire at the following general election, held in 1984.

The President was Johno Johnson.

Name	Party	End term	Years in office
Kath Anderson	Labor	1981	1973–1981
Peter Baldwin	Labor	1984	1976–1982
Roger de Bryon-Faes	Liberal	1981	1961–1981
Don Burton	Labor	1984	1976–1984
Frank Calabro	Liberal	1987	1970–1988
Virginia Chadwick	Liberal	1987	1978–1999
Leo Connellan	National Country	1981	1969–1970, 1970–1981
Fergus Darling	Liberal	1984	1976–1981
Jack Doohan] (Note: Sir John Fuller (National) resigned on 1 August 1978. Jack Doohan was the first National candidate not elected at the 1978 Legislative Council election, and was declared to have been elected to the resulting casual vacancy on 6 December 1978.)	National Country	1981	1978–1991
John Ducker (Note: John Ducker (Labor) resigned on 5 September 1979. Ron Dyer was the only Labor candidate not elected at the 1978 Legislative Council election, and was declared to have been elected to the resulting casual vacancy on 14 September 1979.)	Labor	1984	1972–1979
Fred Duncan	Liberal	1984	1972–1984
Ron Dyer	Labor	1984	1979–2003
Marie Fisher	Labor	1987	1978–1988
Derek Freeman	Liberal	1981	1973–1981, 1981–1984
Barney French	Labor	1981	1973–1991
Deirdre Grusovin	Labor	1987	1978–1990
Jack Hallam	Labor	1981	1973–1991
Clive Healey	Labor	1987	1970–1988
John Holt	Liberal	1984	1972–1984
Dorothy Isaksen	Labor	1987	1978–1988, 1990–1999
Johno Johnson	Labor	1984	1976–2001
Jim Kaldis	Labor	1987	1978–1999
Bill Kennedy	National Country	1984	1971–1984
Norm King	Labor	1987	1978–1988
Delcia Kite	Labor	1984	1976–1995
Paul Landa	Labor	1981	1973–1984
Lloyd Lange	Liberal	1987	1974–1986
Vi Lloyd	Liberal	1981	1973–1981
Toby MacDiarmid	National Country	1987	1973–1988
Peter McMahon	Labor	1981	1973–1981
Herb McPherson	Labor	1981	1964–1981
Robert Melville	Labor	1981	1973–1981
John Morris	Labor	1984	1976–1984
Nathanael Orr	Liberal	1984	1976–1984
Peter Philips	Liberal	1987	1976–1988
Ted Pickering	Liberal	1981	1976–1988
Bob Rowland Smith	National Country	1987	1974–1999
Bill Sandwith	Liberal	1984	1976–1984
Adrian Solomons	National Country	1984	1969–1991
Joe Thompson	Labor	1987	1974–1988
Roy Turner	Labor	1984	1976–1984
Barrie Unsworth	Labor	1987	1978–1986
Peter Watkins	Labor	1987	1978–1987
Max Willis	Liberal	1981	1970–1999

== See also ==
- Second Wran ministry
- Third Wran ministry
