= Results of the 1978 New South Wales Legislative Council election =

Legislative Council election for New South Wales, Australia in October 1978

New South Wales state election, 7 October 1978 Legislative Council
| Enrolled voters | 3,085,661 | | | | |
| Votes cast | 2,862,616 | | Turnout | 92.77 | |
| Informal votes | 115,995 | | Informal | 4.05 | |
Summary of votes by party
| Party | Primary votes | % | Swing | Seats won | Seats held |
| Labor | 1,508,078 | 54.91 | | 9 | 23 |
| Liberal/National Coalition | 996,463 | 36.28 | | 6 | 20 |
| Communist | 79,794 | 2.91 | | 0 | |
| Democrats | 76,369 | 2.78 | | 0 | |
| Family Action Movement | 36,076 | 1.31 | | 0 | |
| Marijuana | 25,055 | 0.91 | | 0 | |
| Independent | 24,786 | 0.90 | | 0 | |
| Total | 2,746,621 | | | 15 | |

The 1978 New South Wales state election was the first direct election for the Legislative Council since the council was reconstituted in 1856 and the creation of the Legislative Assembly. This was the result of the 1978 referendum which also reduced the number of members from 60 to 43 and that provided that members would serve for 3 terms of the Legislative Assembly. Under the transitional arrangements, 28 members had been indirectly elected by joint sittings of the New South Wales Parliament.

Single transferable voting, in a state-wide district, was used to fill the 15 seats open that year.

This is the only Legislative Council election where no party other than Labor, Liberal or National held a seat.

== Results ==
1978 New South Wales state election: Legislative Council
| Party | Candidate | Votes | % | ±% |
|---|---|---|---|---|
| Quota | | 171,664 | | |
| Labor | 1. Joe Thompson (elected 1); 2. Dorothy Isaksen (elected 3); 3. Barrie Unsworth (elected 5); 4. Marie Fisher (elected 7); 5. Clive Healey (elected 9); 6. Deirdre Grusovin (elected 11); 7. Jim Kaldis (elected 12); 8. Norm King (elected 13); 9. Peter Watkins (elected 14); 10. Ron Dyer | 1,508,708 | 54.9 | |
| Liberal/National Coalition | 1. Virginia Chadwick (elected 2); 2. Bob Rowland Smith (elected 4); 3. Frank Calabro (elected 6); 4. Lloyd Lange (elected 8); 5. Toby MacDiarmid (elected 10); 6. Peter Philips (elected 15); 7. Greg Percival; 8. Jack Doohan; 9. Diana Downie; 10. Doug Moppett | 994,857 | 36.2 | |
| Communist | 1. Jack Mundey; 2. Melva Merletto; 3. Darrell Dawson | 79,794 | 2.9 | |
| Democrats | 1. Paul McLean; 2. Ronald Mallett; 3. Malcolm Hilbery; 4. Charles Boag; 5. Laurence Bourke; 6. James Boow; 7. Joan Kersey; 8. Bruce Irwin; 9. George Laron; 10. Anita Stiller | 76,369 | 2.8 | |
| Family Movement | 1. Frieda Brown; 2. Malcolm Garvin | 36,076 | 1.3 | |
| Marijuana | 1. Peter Livesey; 2. James Billington | 25,055 | 0.9 | |
| Group C | 1. Francesco Oliveri; 2. Norman Young | 14,033 | 0.5 | |
| Independent | Frank Arkell | 3,188 | 0.1 | |
| Independent | Ross Green | 3,160 | 0.1 | |
| Independent | Allen Hands | 1,262 | 0.05 | |
| Independent | Judith Courtney | 1,107 | 0.04 | |
| Independent | Rudolph Dezelin | 910 | 0.03 | |
| Independent | William Whitby | 584 | 0.02 | |
| Independent | Brian Brady | 542 | 0.02 | |
| Total formal votes | | 2,746,621 | 96.0 | |
| Informal votes | | 115,995 | 4.0 | |
| Turnout | | 2,862,616 | 92.8 | |

== Continuing Members ==
28 members retained their seats in the council, with 14 of those members to retire at the next general election, (Note: Of the 15 members whose terms were due to expire in 1985, Greg Percival (Liberal) did not retain a seat.) held in 1981, and the remaining 14 members would retire at the following general election, (Note: Of the 15 members whose terms were due to expire in 1988, Ronald Raines (National Country) did not retain a seat.) held in 1984.

| Name | Party | End term | Years in office |
|---|---|---|---|
| Kath Anderson | Labor | 1981 | 1973–1981 |
| Peter Baldwin | Labor | 1984 | 1976–1982 |
| Don Burton | Labor | 1984 | 1976–1984 |
| John Ducker | Labor | 1984 | 1972–1979 |
| Barney French | Labor | 1981 | 1973–1991 |
| Jack Hallam | Labor | 1981 | 1973–1991 |
| Johno Johnson | Labor | 1984 | 1976–2001 |
| Delcia Kite | Labor | 1984 | 1976–1995 |
| Paul Landa | Labor | 1981 | 1973–1984 |
| Peter McMahon | Labor | 1981 | 1973–1981 |
| Herb McPherson | Labor | 1981 | 1964–1981 |
| Robert Melville | Labor | 1981 | 1973–1981 |
| John Morris | Labor | 1984 | 1976–1984 |
| Roy Turner | Labor | 1984 | 1976–1984 |
| Roger de Bryon-Faes | Liberal | 1981 | 1961–1981 |
| Fergus Darling | Liberal | 1984 | 1976–1981 |
| Fred Duncan | Liberal | 1984 | 1972–1984 |
| Derek Freeman | Liberal | 1981 | 1973–1981, 1981–1984 |
| John Holt | Liberal | 1984 | 1972–1984 |
| Vi Lloyd | Liberal | 1981 | 1973–1981 |
| Nathanael Orr | Liberal | 1984 | 1976–1984 |
| Ted Pickering | Liberal | 1981 | 1976–1988 |
| Bill Sandwith | Liberal | 1984 | 1976–1984 |
| Max Willis | Liberal | 1981 | 1970–1999 |
| Leo Connellan | National Country | 1981 | 1969–1970, 1970–1981 |
| Jack Doohan (Note: Sir John Fuller (National Country) resigned on 1 August 1978, prior to the election. Jack Doohan was the first National Country candidate not elected at the 1978 Legislative Council election, and was declared to have been elected to the resulting casual vacancy on 6 December 1978.) | National Country | 1981 | 1978–1981 |
| Bill Kennedy | National Country | 1984 | 1971–1984 |
| Adrian Solomons | National Country | 1984 | 1969–1991 |

== See also ==
- Results of the 1978 New South Wales state election (Legislative Assembly)
- Candidates of the 1978 New South Wales state election
- Members of the New South Wales Legislative Council, 1978–1981
