= Members of the New South Wales Legislative Council, 1988–1991 =

Members of the New South Wales Legislative Council, 1988–1991

Members of the New South Wales Legislative Council who served in the 49th Parliament were elected at the 1981, 1984 and 1988 elections. Members served for three terms of the Legislative Assembly, which, as a result of the 1981 referendum meant the maximum term was twelve years. The 15 members elected in 1981 did not face re-election until 1992, the 15 members elected in 1984 did not face re-election until 1996 and the 15 members elected in 1988 did not face re-election until 2000. The terms of members were cut short by the 1991 referendum which reduced the term to two terms of the Legislative Assembly, a maximum of 8 years. The President was Johno Johnson.

Name	Party	End term	Years in office
Franca Arena	Labor	1992	1981–1999
Marie Bignold (Note: Marie Bignold was expelled from the Call to Australia Party in November 1988. She served out the remainder of her term as an independent.)	Call to Australia/Independent	1996	1984–1991
George Brenner	Labor	1992	1981–1991
Richard Bull	National	1996	1984–2000
Virginia Chadwick	Liberal	2000	1978–1999
Jack Doohan	National	1992	1978–1991
Ron Dyer	Labor	1996	1979–2003
Michael Egan	Labor	2000	1986–2005
Keith Enderbury	Labor	1996	1984–1995
Beryl Evans	Liberal	1996	1984–1995
Barney French	Labor	2000	1973–1991
Jack Garland (Note: Labor MLC Jack Garland resigned on 9 April 1990. Jeff Shaw was appointed to the resulting casual vacancy on 1 May.)	Labor	1992	1981–1990
Duncan Gay	National	2000	1988–2017
Marlene Goldsmith	Liberal	2000	1988–1999
Deirdre Grusovin (Note: Labor MLC Deirdre Grusovin resigned on 23 June 1990 in order to contest a by-election for the Legislative Assembly seat of Heffron. Former MLC Dorothy Isaksen was appointed to the resulting casual vacancy on 4 July.)	Labor	2000	1978–1990
Jack Hallam	Labor	1992	1973–1991
Fred Hankinson	Labor	1992	1984–1991
John Hannaford	Liberal	1992	1984–1999
Mick Ibbett	Labor	1992	1984–1991
Dorothy Isaksen	Labor	2000	1978–1988, 1990–1999
Judy Jakins	National	1996	1984–1991
John Jobling	Liberal	1996	1984–2003
Johno Johnson	Labor	1996	1976–2001
Richard Jones	Democrats	2000	1988–2003
Jim Kaldis	Labor	2000	1978–1999
Richard Killen	National	1992	1981–1991
Elisabeth Kirkby	Democrats	1992	1981–1998
Delcia Kite	Labor	1996	1976–1995
Ian Macdonald	Labor	2000	1988–2010
Andy Manson	Labor	2000	1988–2000
John Matthews	Liberal	1992	1981–1991
Stephen Mutch	Liberal	2000	1988–1996
Elaine Nile	Call to Australia	2000	1988–2002
Fred Nile	Call to Australia	1992	1981–2004, 2004–present
Paul O'Grady	Labor	2000	1988–1996
Brian Pezzutti	Liberal	2000	1988–2003
Ted Pickering	Liberal	1992	1976–1995
Ken Reed	Labor	1992	1981–1991
Bob Rowland Smith	National	2000	1974–1999
Jim Samios	Liberal	1996	1984–2003
Helen Sham-Ho	Liberal	2000	1988–2003
Jeff Shaw	Labor	1992	1990–2000
Sir Adrian Solomons	National	1996	1969–1991
Ann Symonds	Labor	1996	1982–1998
Bryan Vaughan	Labor	1992	1981–1999
Judith Walker	Labor	1996	1984–1995
Max Willis	Liberal	1992	1970–1999
