= Candidates of the 1981 New South Wales state election =

This is a list of candidates of the 1981 New South Wales state election. The election was held on 19 September 1981.

== Retiring Members ==
=== Labor ===
- Gordon Barnier MLA (Blacktown)
- Syd Einfeld MLA (Waverley)
- Harry Jensen MLA (Munmorah)
- Lew Johnstone MLA (Broken Hill)
- Cliff Mallam MLA (Campbelltown)
- Kath Anderson MLC
- Peter McMahon MLC
- Herb McPherson MLC
- Robert Melville MLC

=== Liberal ===
- Dick Healey MLA (Davidson)
- John Mason MLA (Dubbo)
- Roger de Bryon-Faes MLC
- Vi Lloyd MLC

=== National Country ===
- Tim Bruxner MLA (Tenterfield)
- George Freudenstein MLA (Young)
- Peter King MLA (Oxley)
- John Sullivan MLA (Sturt)
- Jim Taylor MLA (Temora)
- Leo Connellan MLC

== Legislative Assembly ==
Sitting members are shown in bold text. Successful candidates are highlighted in the relevant colour. Where there is possible confusion, an asterisk (*) is also used.

Electorate	Held by	Labor candidate	Coalition candidate	Other candidates
Albury	Labor	**Harold Mair**	Brian Moriarty (Lib)	
Ashfield	Labor	**Paul Whelan**	George Dryden (Lib)	Albert Jarman (Dem)
Auburn	Labor	**Peter Cox**	David Lynam (Lib)	
Balmain	Labor	**Roger Degen**	Dianne Street (Lib)	James Donovan (SPA); Denis Freney (CPA); Franco Paisio (Dem); Douglas Spedding (Ind)
Bankstown	Labor	**Ric Mochalski**	James McDonald (Lib)	Donna Hoban (Ind)
Barwon	NCP	Richard Emerson	**Wal Murray** (NCP)	
Bass Hill	Labor	**Neville Wran**	Paul Jones (Lib)	
Bathurst	Labor	**Mick Clough**	**Clive Osborne** (NCP)	
Blacktown	Labor	John Aquilina	David Bannerman (Lib)	
Bligh	Labor	Fred Miller	**John Barraclough** (Lib)	George Warnecke (Ind); Joseph Zingarelli (Dem)
Blue Mountains	Labor	Bob Debus	Reg Gillard (Lib)	Harry Marsh (Ind)
Broken Hill	Labor	Bill Beckroge	George Gleeson (NCP)	
Burrinjuck	Labor	**Terry Sheahan**	John Harvey (NCP)	Scott Milne (Dem)
Burwood	Labor	**Phil O'Neill**	Bruce MacCarthy (Lib)	Stephen Kirkham (Dem)
Byron	NCP	Thomas Hogan	**Jack Boyd** (NCP)	Kenneth Nicholson (Dem)
Cabramatta	Labor	**Eric Bedford**	Kerry Chikarovski (Lib)	
Camden	Labor	Ralph Brading	Peter Reynolds (Lib)	Raymond Guy (Dem)
Campbelltown	Labor	Michael Knight		William Dowsett (Ind); Gordon Fetterplace (Ind); William O'Donnell (Ind)
Canterbury	Labor	**Kevin Stewart**	Colin Thew (Lib)	
Castlereagh	NCP	**Jim Curran**	**Roger Wotton** (NCP)	
Cessnock	Labor	**Stan Neilly**	James White (Lib)	Gregory Mutton (Dem)
Charlestown	Labor	**Richard Face**	Robert Cowley (Lib)	
Clarence	Labor	**Don Day**	William Ralston (NCP)	
Coffs Harbour	NCP	Joseph Moran	**Matt Singleton** (NCP)	
Coogee	Labor	**Michael Cleary**	Kenneth Finn (Lib)	Michael Gluyas (Ind)
Corrimal	Labor	**Laurie Kelly**	Colin Bruton (Lib)	Carol Blond (Ind); Questa Gill (Dem)
Cronulla	Labor	**Michael Egan**	Stephen Mutch (Lib)	
Davidson	Liberal	Julie Sutton	Terry Metherell (Lib)	
Drummoyne	Labor	**Michael Maher**	Sarah Hewson (Lib)	Peter Nelson (Dem)
Dubbo	Liberal	Peter Morgan	Gerry Peacocke* (NCP); Eric Woods (Lib)	
Earlwood	Labor	**Ken Gabb**	Shirley Watson (Lib)	Paul Terrett (Dem)
East Hills	Labor	**Pat Rogan**	Paul Brazier (Lib)	Margaret Vitlin (Dem)
Eastwood	Liberal	Jeff Shaw	**Jim Clough** (Lib)	Peter Chambers (Dem)
Elizabeth	Labor	**Pat Hills**	John Davison (Lib)	Aileen Beaver (CPA)
Fairfield	Labor	Janice Crosio	Robert Goninon (Lib)	
Georges River	Labor	**Frank Walker**	Terence Morgan (Lib)	Wallace Burak (Dem); Bruce Galloway (Ind); Phillip Gerlach (Ind); Eric Stavely-Alexander (Ind)
Gladesville	Labor	**Rodney Cavalier**	Ivan Petch (Lib)	Robert Springett (Dem)
Gloucester	NCP	John Eastman	**Leon Punch** (NCP)	
Gordon	Liberal	George Doumanis	**Tim Moore** (Lib)	Ilse Robey (Dem)
Gosford	Labor	**Brian McGowan**	Andrew Fennell (Lib)	Paul Baker (Ind); Robert Bell (Dem); Barry Phillips (Ind)
Goulburn	NCP	Robert Stephens	**Ron Brewer** (NCP)	
Granville	Labor	**Pat Flaherty**	Florence Maio (Lib)	
Hawkesbury	Liberal	Bennett Fienberg	**Kevin Rozzoli** (Lib)	John Whittington (Ind)
Heathcote	Labor	**Rex Jackson**	Ron Phillips (Lib)	Warren Evans (Dem); Maree Jamieson (Ind)
Heffron	Labor	**Laurie Brereton**	Carolyn O'Connor (Lib)	
Hornsby	Liberal	Christopher Gorrick	**Neil Pickard** (Lib)	Timothy Daly (Ind); John Haydon (Dem)
Hurstville	Labor	**Kevin Ryan**	Frederick Harvison (Lib)	Frank Low (Dem)
Illawarra	Labor	**George Petersen**	Mervyn Lucke (Lib)	James Kay (Dem); Susan Sallans (Ind)
Ingleburn	Labor	Stan Knowles	Gary Lucas (Lib)	
Kiama	Labor	**Bill Knott**	James Chittick (Lib)	
Kogarah	Labor	**Bill Crabtree**	Patrick O'Brien (Lib)	Albert Ost (Dem)
Ku-ring-gai	Liberal	Ian Cameron	**Nick Greiner** (Lib)	Pamela Tuckwell (Dem)
Lachlan	NCP	Timothy West	Ian Armstrong (NCP)	
Lake Macquarie	Labor	**Merv Hunter**	Judith Ball (Lib)	Genady Levitch (Dem)
Lakemba	Labor	**Vince Durick**	Vivian Salama (Lib)	
Lane Cove	Liberal	Miron Shapira	**John Dowd** (Lib)	Gary Smith (Dem); Rhody Thomas (Ind)
Lismore	NCP	Alan Veavock	**Bruce Duncan** (NCP)	
Liverpool	Labor	**George Paciullo**	Raymond Marsh (Lib)	David Bransdon (Ind); Patrick Leyman (Ind)
Maitland	Labor	Allan Walsh	**Peter Toms** (Lib)	Jack Collins (Ind); James Roberts (Ind)
Manly	Labor	**Alan Stewart**	Nelson Meers (Lib)	Patricia Langworthy (Ind)
Maroubra	Labor	**Bill Haigh**	Mervyn Colbron (Lib)	
Marrickville	Labor	**Tom Cahill**	John Kekis (Lib)	Anthony Larkings (Dem); Christopher Taylor (SPA)
Merrylands	Labor	**Jack Ferguson**	Alan Byers (Lib)	
Miranda	Labor	**Bill Robb**	Lawrence Power (Lib)	Richard Hopkins (Dem)
Monaro	Labor	**John Akister**	David Barton (Lib); Susan Mitchell (NCP)	Christopher Kleiss (Ind)
Mosman	Liberal	Richard Lancaster	**David Arblaster** (Lib)	
Murray	NCP	Robert Allen	**Tim Fischer** (NCP)	Gregory Butler (Dem)
Murrumbidgee	Labor	**Lin Gordon**	John Armstrong (NCP)	Thomas Marriott (Ind)
Newcastle	Labor	**Arthur Wade**	Alex Bevan (Lib)	Kay Wicks (CPA)
Northcott	Liberal	Therese McGee	**Jim Cameron** (Lib)	Ian Irwin (Dem)
Northern Tablelands	NCP	**Bill McCarthy**	John Tregurtha (NCP)	
North Shore	Liberal	Maurice May	**Bruce McDonald** (Lib)	Ted Mack* (Ind); Norman Ward (Dem)
Orange	NCP	Harold Gartrell	**Garry West** (NCP)	
Oxley	NCP	Alick Rogers	**Jim Brown** (NCP)	
Parramatta	Labor	**Barry Wilde**	Paul Zammit (Lib)	Anthony Buhagiar (Ind); Barry Jacques (Dem)
Peats	Labor	**Keith O'Connell**	Raymond Carter (Lib)	John Aitken (Dem)
Penrith	Labor	**Peter Anderson**	Ross Shuttleworth (Lib)	
Pittwater	Liberal	Patrick Sewell	**Max Smith** (Lib)	
Riverstone	Labor	**Tony Johnson**	Kenneth Jessup (Lib)	John Cavenett (Dem)
Rockdale	Labor	**Brian Bannon**	John Tonkin (Lib)	
Ryde	Labor	**Garry McIlwaine**	Donald Wilkinson (Lib)	Christopher Dunkerley (Dem)
St Marys	Labor	**Ron Mulock**	Rodney Field (Lib)	
Seven Hills	Labor	Bob Christie	Heather Gow (Lib)	Peggy Cable (Dem)
South Coast	Independent			**John Hatton** (Ind)
Swansea	Labor	Don Bowman	Denis Dolan (Lib)	Lyn Godfrey (Dem)
Tamworth	NCP	Garrett Ryan	**Noel Park** (NCP)	Noel Cassell (Dem)
The Hills	Liberal	Barry Calvert	**Fred Caterson** (Lib)	Rona Samuels (Dem)
Tuggerah	Labor	Harry Moore	Joan Skaife (Lib)	Lynn Sawyer (Dem)
Upper Hunter	NCP	Ronald Brumpton	**Col Fisher** (NCP)	
Vaucluse	Liberal	Nance Loney	**Rosemary Foot** (Lib)	Brian Hillman (Dem); Mark Ure (Ind)
Wagga Wagga	Liberal	Thomas Watson	**Joe Schipp** (Lib)	Rodney Dominish (Dem)
Wakehurst	Labor	**Tom Webster**	Phillip Wearne (Lib)	Henri Rathgeber (Dem)
Wallsend	Labor	**Ken Booth**	Richard Noonan (Lib)	
Waratah	Labor	**Sam Jones**	Pauline Graham (Lib)	Christopher Dodds (CPA)
Waverley	Labor	Ernie Page	Albert Ross (Lib)	
Wentworthville	Labor	**Ernie Quinn**	Colin Edwards (Lib)	
Willoughby	Liberal	**Eddie Britt**	Peter Collins (Lib)	Kenneth Thomas (Ind)
Wollongong	Labor	**Eric Ramsay**	Ronald Brooks (Lib)	Frank Arkell (Ind); Ellen Love (Ind); Meg Sampson (Dem)
Woronora	Labor	**Maurie Keane**	Chris Downy (Lib)	

== Legislative Council ==
Sitting members are shown in bold text. Tickets that elected at least one MLC are highlighted in the relevant colour. Successful candidates are identified by an asterisk (*).

Labor candidates	Coalition candidates	Democrats candidates	CTA candidates	Environment candidates	Progress candidates
1. **Paul Landa***; 2. **Jack Hallam***; 3. Jack Garland*; 4. **Barney French***; 5. Franca Arena*; 6. George Brenner*; 7. Ken Reed*; 8. Bryan Vaughan*; 9. Ann Symonds; 10. Fred Hankinson	1. **Max Willis*** (Lib); 2. **Jack Doohan*** (NCP); 3. **Ted Pickering*** (Lib); 4. John Matthews* (Lib); 5. Richard Killen* (NCP); 6. **Derek Freeman** (Lib); 7. Judy Jakins (NCP); 8. Bronwyn Bishop (Lib); 9. John Hagan (Lib); 10. Doug Moppett (NCP)	1. Elisabeth Kirkby*; 2. Paul McLean; 3. James Boow; 4. Christine Townend; 5. Laurence Bourke; 6. Ray Griffiths; 7. Ross McInnes; 8. Richard Beazley; 9. Joe Lake; 10. Elizabeth Poppleton	1. Fred Nile*; 2. Graham McLennan; 3. Kevin Hume; 4. Tom Toogood; 5. Percy Everingham	1. Keith Suter; 2. Dudley Leggett; 3. Jennifer Quealy; 4. Quentin Jacobsen	1. Henry Soper; 2. Marjorie Wisby; 3. William More
Republican candidates	SDP candidates	Ungrouped candidates			
1. Brian Buckley; 2. Marie McKern	1. Walter Roach; 2. Johann Liszikam	Louis Patmoy; Rudolph Dezelin			

== See also ==
- Members of the New South Wales Legislative Assembly, 1981–1984
- Members of the New South Wales Legislative Council, 1981–1984
