= Members of the New South Wales Legislative Council, 1991–1995 =

Members of the New South Wales Legislative Council, 1991–1995

Members of the New South Wales Legislative Council who served in the 50th Parliament were affected by the 1991 referendum which reduced the number of members and reduced their term from three terms of the Legislative Assembly to two terms, meaning the maximum term was eight years. The Council consisted of 42 members, 12 elected in 1984, 15 elected in 1988 and 15 elected in 1991. Half of the council would face re-election in 1995 and half did not face re-election until 1999. The President was Johno Johnson until 3 July 1991 and then Max Willis.

Name	Party	End term	Years in office
Franca Arena	Labor	1999	1981–1999
Richard Bull	National	1995	1984–2000
Meredith Burgmann	Labor	1999	1991–2007
Jan Burnswoods	Labor	1999	1991–2007
Virginia Chadwick	Liberal	1999	1978–1999
Lloyd Coleman (Note: National Party MLC Sir Adrian Solomons resigned on 2 August 1991. Lloyd Coleman was appointed to the resulting casual vacancy on 21 August.)	National	1995	1991–1995
Ron Dyer	Labor	1995	1979–2003
Michael Egan	Labor	1995	1986–2005
Keith Enderbury	Labor	1995	1984–1995
Beryl Evans (Note: Beryl Evans was not selected for the Liberal ticket for the 1995 Legislative Council election and served the end of her term as a member of the Seniors party)	Liberal / Seniors	1995	1984–1995
Patricia Forsythe	Liberal	1999	1991–2006
Jenny Gardiner	National	1999	1991–2015
Duncan Gay	National	1995	1988–2017
Marlene Goldsmith	Liberal	1999	1988–1999
Jack Hallam (Note: Labor MLC Jack Hallam resigned on 12 September 1991. Eddie Obeid was appointed to the resulting casual vacancy on the same day.)	Labor	1999	1973–1991
John Hannaford	Liberal	1995	1984–1999
Dorothy Isaksen	Labor	1999	1978–1988, 1990–1999
John Jobling	Liberal	1995	1984–2003
Johno Johnson	Labor	1995	1976–2001
Richard Jones	Democrats	1995	1988–2003
Jim Kaldis	Labor	1999	1978–1999
Elisabeth Kirkby	Democrats	1999	1981–1998
Delcia Kite	Labor	1995	1976–1995
Ian Macdonald	Labor	1999	1988–2010
Andy Manson	Labor	1995	1988–2000
Doug Moppett	National	1999	1976–1978, 1991–2000
Stephen Mutch	Liberal	1995	1988–1996
Elaine Nile	Call to Australia	1995	1988–2002
Fred Nile	Call to Australia	1999	1981–2004, 2004–present
Paul O'Grady	Labor	1995	1988–1996
Eddie Obeid	Labor	1999	1991–2011
Brian Pezzutti	Liberal	1995	1988–2003
Ted Pickering	Liberal	1999	1976–1995
Bob Rowland Smith	National	1999	1974–1999
John Ryan	Liberal	1999	1991–2007
Jim Samios	Liberal	1995	1984–2003
Helen Sham-Ho	Liberal	1995	1988–2003
Jeff Shaw	Labor	1999	1990–2000
Sir Adrian Solomons	National	1995	1969–1991
Ann Symonds	Labor	1995	1982–1998
Bryan Vaughan	Labor	1999	1981–1999
Judith Walker	Labor	1995	1984–1995
Robert Webster	National	1999	1991–1995
Max Willis	Liberal	1999	1970–1999
