= Results of the 1991 New South Wales Legislative Council election =

Legislative Council election for New South Wales, Australia in March 1991

Party	Votes	%	+/–	Seats			
Party	Votes	%	+/–	Seats Won	Not Up	Total Seats	Seat Change
Liberal/National Coalition	1,453,441	46.02	▼0.81	7	13	20	▲1
Labor	1,195,324	37.85	▼0.22	6	12	18	▼3
Democrats	167,245	5.30	▲3.97	1	1	2	Steady
Call to Australia	114,648	3.63	▼2.16	1	1	2	▼1
Greens	106,325	3.37	New	0	0	0	New
EFF/Grey Power/CEC	49,077	1.55	▼0.87	0	0	0	Steady
Country Residents Party	21,628	0.68	New	0	0	0	New
No Toxic Incinerator Group	18,706	0.59	New	0	0	0	New
Marie Bignold Team	14,403	0.46	New	0	0	0	New
Others	17,598	0.56		0	0	0	Steady
Total	3,158,395	100.00	–	15	27	42	–
Valid votes	3,158,395	94.25					
Invalid/blank votes	192,718	5.75	▼2.64				
Total votes	3,351,113	100.00	–				
Registered voters/turnout	3,631,618	92.28	▲1.66				
Source: NSW Parliament

This is a list of results for the Legislative Council at the 1991 New South Wales state election.

== Results ==
1991 New South Wales state election: Legislative Council
Party	Candidate	Votes	%	±%
Quota		200,365		
Liberal/National Coalition	1. Ted Pickering (elected 1); 2. Robert Webster (elected 4); 3. Max Willis (elected 6); 4. Patricia Forsythe (elected 8); 5. Doug Moppett (elected 10); 6. John Ryan (elected 12); 7. Jenny Gardiner (elected 13); 8. Tony Gentile; 9. Marilyn Pidgeon; 10. Ian Brown	1,453,441	45.3	−0.8
Labor	1. Jack Hallam (elected 2); 2. Jeff Shaw (elected 5); 3. Bryan Vaughan (elected 7); 4. Meredith Burgmann (elected 9); 5. Franca Arena (elected 11); 6. Jan Burnswoods (elected 15); 7. Eddie Obeid; 8. Tony Kelly; 9. Graham Freudenberg; 10. Hatton Kwok	1,192,678	37.2	−0.2
Democrats	1. Elisabeth Kirkby (elected 3); 2. Jonathan King; 3. Ray Griffiths; 4. Meg Simpson	214,682	6.7	+4.0
Call to Australia	1. Fred Nile (elected 14); 2. Beville Varidel; 3. Bruce Coleman; 4. Peter Walker; 5. John Everingham	114,648	3.6	−2.2
Greens	1. Ian Cohen; 2. David Nerlich	106,325	3.3	+3.3
EFF/Grey Power/CEC	1. Eddy Azzopardi; 2. Robert Clarke; 3. Paul Galea; 4. Leone Hay	49,077	1.5	-0.9
Country Residents	1. William Gilmore; 2. Desmond Ayres; 3. John Kember	21,628	0.7	+0.7
No Toxic Incinerator	1. Ray Fardell; 2. Mark Findlay	18,706	0.6	+0.6
Marie Bignold Team	1. Alicia Bignold; 2. Brett Hartley; 3. Christine Smith; 4. Nancy Malcolm	14,403	0.5	+0.5
Group E	1. Andy Hart; 2. Paul Wilton; 3. George Vitanza; 4. Greg Hirst	8,080	0.3	+0.3
Group I	1. Patricia Poulos; 2. John Holley	6,885	0.2	+0.2
Independent	John Kouroupakis	1,030	0.03	+0.03
Independent	Lord Rolo	1,011	0.03	+0.03
Independent	John Hegarty	411	0.01	+0.01
Independent	Tony Galati	181	0.01	+0.01
Total formal votes		3,205,832	94.3	+2.6
Informal votes		192,718	5.7	−2.6
Turnout		3,398,550	93.6	+1.7

== Continuing members ==
The following MLCs were not up for re-election this year.

Member	Party	End term	Years in office
Virginia Chadwick	Liberal	1999	1988–1999
Beryl Evans	Liberal	1995	1984–1995
Marlene Goldsmith	Liberal	1999	1988–1999
John Hannaford	Liberal	1995	1984–1999
John Jobling	Liberal	1995	1984–2003
Stephen Mutch	Liberal	1999	1988–1996
Brian Pezzutti	Liberal	1999	1988–2003
Jim Samios	Liberal	1995	1984–2003
Helen Sham-Ho	Liberal	1999	1988–2003
Richard Bull	National	1995	1984–2000
Duncan Gay	National	1999	1988–2017
Judy Jakins	National	1995 (Note: The result of the 1991 referendum held at the same time was that only the first 12 elected at the 1984 election continued to be members and the last 3 elected ceased to be members.)	1984–1991
Bob Rowland Smith	National	1999	1988–1999
Adrian Solomons	National	1995	1984–1991
Ron Dyer	Labor	1995	1984–1995
Michael Egan	Labor	1995	1988–1995
Keith Enderbury	Labor	1995	1984–1995
Mick Ibbett	Labor	1995	1984–1991
Dorothy Isaksen	Labor	1999	1978–1988, 1990–1999
Johno Johnson	Labor	1995	1984–1995
Jim Kaldis	Labor	1999	1988–1999
Delcia Kite	Labor	1995	1984–1995
Ian Macdonald	Labor	1999	1988–2010
Andy Manson	Labor	1995	1988–1995
Paul O'Grady	Labor	1995	1988–1996
Ann Symonds	Labor	1995	1984–1995
Judith Walker	Labor	1995	1984–1995
Elaine Nile	Call to Australia	1999	1988–2002
Richard Jones	Democrats	1999	1988–2003
Marie Bignold	Marie Bignold Team	1995	1984–1991

== See also ==
- Results of the 1991 New South Wales state election (Legislative Assembly)
- Candidates of the 1991 New South Wales state election
- Members of the New South Wales Legislative Council, 1991–1995
