= 1981 New South Wales state election =

State election for New South Wales, Australia in September 1981

- 19 September 1981

All 99 seats in the New South Wales Legislative Assembly and 15 (of 44) seats in the New South Wales Legislative Council 50 Assembly seats needed for a majority
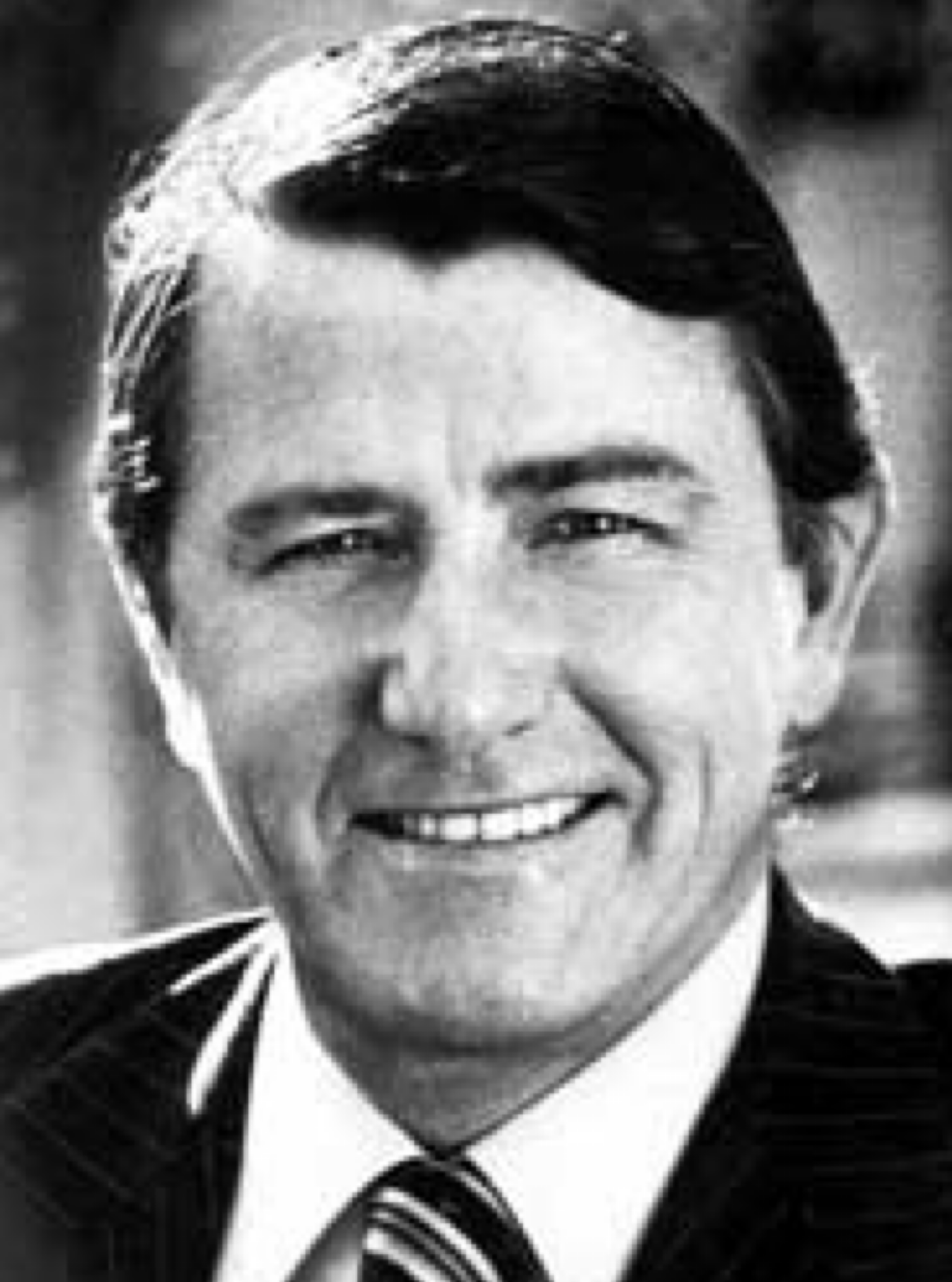
	First party	Second party
		L/NP
Leader	Neville Wran	Bruce McDonald
Party	Labor	Liberal/National coalition
Leader since	3 December 1973	1 June 1981
Leader's seat	Bass Hill	Kirribilli (contested North Shore; lost)
Last election	63 seats	35 seats
Seats won	69	28
Seat change	▲6	▼7
Popular vote	1,564,622	1,090,304
Percentage	55.73%	38.83%
Swing	▼2.04	▲1.95
TPP	58.70%	41.30%
TPP swing	▼2.00	▲2.00
- Two-candidate-preferred margin by electorate
Premier before election
Neville Wran
Labor
Elected Premier
Neville Wran
Labor

Elections were held in the state of New South Wales, Australia, on Saturday 19 September 1981. The result was a second "Wranslide": a landslide victory for the Labor Party under Neville Wran. Labor increased its already sizeable majority, winning what is still its biggest-ever share of seats in the New South Wales Legislative Assembly–69 out of 99 seats, 69.7 percent of the chamber until 2011 when it was surpassed by Barry O'Farrell’s landslide election win when the Liberal—National Coalition won 74% of seats.

The Liberals suffered the double indignity of losing the seat contested by their leader Bruce McDonald to an independent, and of being reduced to the same number of seats in parliament as their ostensible junior coalition partner, the National Country Party. In fact it was the second election in a row in which the sitting Liberal leader had failed to win a seat; Peter Coleman had been rolled in his own seat in 1978. Both the Liberals and National Country Party finished with 14 seats.

The election marked another milestone for electoral reform in New South Wales. The allocation of preferences became optional, and partisan gerrymandering was eliminated. Additionally, the practice of creating smaller rural seats to boost country representation was ended. Two further reforms were proposed—and passed—in referendums put to voters on the same day.

Ted Mack, mayor of North Sydney Council, won the seat of North Shore from Opposition Leader McDonald. John Hatton was re-elected unopposed in the seat of South Coast.

== Key dates ==
Date	Event
28 August 1981	The Legislative Assembly was dissolved, and writs were issued by the Governor to proceed with an election.
3 September 1981	Nominations for candidates for the election closed at noon.
19 September 1981	Polling day, between the hours of 8am and 6pm.
2 October 1981	The fourth Wran ministry was constituted.
23 October 1981	The writ was returned and the results formally declared.
28 October 1981	Parliament resumed for business.

== Results ==
=== Legislative Assembly ===
New South Wales state election, 19 September 1981 Legislative Assembly << 1978–1984 >>
Enrolled voters	3,178,225 (Note: There were 3,212,657 enrolled voters but 34,432 were enrolled in South Coast (Independent) which was uncontested at the election.)				
Votes cast	2,897,033		Turnout	91.15	–1.62
Informal votes	89,306		Informal	3.08	+0.80
Summary of votes by party
Party	Primary votes	%	Swing	Seats	Change
Labor	1,564,622	55.73	–2.04	69	+ 6
Liberal	775,463	27.62	+0.64	14	– 4
National Country	314,841	11.21	+1.31	14	– 3
Democrats	68,252	2.43	–0.22	0	± 0
Communist	6,150	0.22	–0.08	0	± 0
Independent	78,399	2.79	+0.55	2	+ 1
Total	2,807,727			99	
Two-party-preferred
Labor		58.7%	-2.0%		
Liberal/National		41.3%	+2.0%		

Popular vote
Labor	55.73%
Liberal	27.62%
National Country	11.21%
Independents	2.79%
Democrats	2.43%
Communist	0.22%
Two-party-preferred vote
Labor	58.7%
Coalition	41.3%
Parliamentary seats
Labor	69
Liberal	14
National Country	14
Independents	2

=== Legislative Council ===
New South Wales state election, 19 September 1981 Legislative Council
Enrolled voters	3,212,657				
Votes cast	2,927,971		Turnout	91.14	–1.63
Informal votes	200,367		Informal	6.84	+2.79
Summary of votes by party
Party	Primary votes	%	Swing	Seats won	Seats held
Labor	1,412,426	51.78	–3.13	8	24
Liberal/National Coalition	921,081	33.77	–2.49	5	18
Call to Australia	248,425	9.11	+7.80	1	1
Democrats	109,939	4.03	+1.25	1	1
Environmental Action	18,056	0.66	+0.66	0	0
Republican	10,184	0.37	+0.37	0	0
Progress	3,121	0.11	+0.11	0	0
Social Democrats	2,512	0.09	+0.09	0	0
Independent	24,786	0.07	–0.83	0	0
Total	2,727,604			15	

== Seats changing hands ==
Seat	Pre-1981			Swing	Post-1981		
Seat	Party	Member	Margin	Swing	Margin	Member	Party
Dubbo	Liberal	John Mason	3.4	N/A	9.2	Ian Glachan	National Country
Northern Tablelands	National Country	new seat	1.9	-4.8	2.9	Bill McCarthy	Labor
North Shore	Liberal	new seat	3.8	-8.4	4.6	Ted Mack	Independent

- Members listed in italics did not recontest their seats.
- In addition, the National Country held the seat of Murray, which it won from the Liberals in the 1980 by-election.

=== Redistribution affected seats ===
Seat	1978 election			1980 redistribution			Swing	1981 election		
Seat	Party	Member	Margin	Party	Member	Margin	Swing	Margin	Member	Party
Bathurst	National Country	Clive Osborne	2.7	Labor	Notional	7.7	-7.6	0.1	Mick Clough	Labor
Bligh	Liberal	John Barraclough	8.4	Labor	Notional	6.6	-3.9	2.7	Fred Miller	Labor
Castlereagh	Labor	Jim Curran	6.9	National Country	Notional	4.3	-0.9	3.4	Roger Wotton	National Country
Clarence	National Country	Matt Singleton	10.9	Labor	Notional	2.8	+3.8	6.6	Don Day	Labor
Hornsby	Liberal	Neil Pickard	0.8	Labor	Notional	1.7	-5.5	3.8	Neil Pickard	Liberal
Maitland	Liberal	Peter Toms	4.3	Labor	Notional	0.3	+7.2	7.5	Allan Walsh	Labor
Willoughby	Labor	Eddie Britt	0.8	Liberal	Notional	2.2	+1.5	3.7	Peter Collins	Liberal

- Sitting MP for Clarence Matt Singleton instead contested the new seat of Coffs Harbour and won.

== Post-election pendulum ==
Labor seats (69)
Marginal
Bathurst	Mick Clough	ALP	0.1%
Wollongong	Eric Ramsay	ALP	0.1% v IND
Manly	Alan Stewart	ALP	1.2%
Camden	Ralph Brading	ALP	2.0%
Bligh	Fred Miller	ALP	2.7%
Northern Tablelands	Bill McCarthy	ALP	2.9%
Miranda	Bill Robb	ALP	4.3%
Albury	Harold Mair	ALP	5.3%
Cronulla	Michael Egan	ALP	5.3%
Fairly safe
Campbelltown	Michael Knight	ALP	6.0% v IND
Clarence	Don Day	ALP	6.6%
Gosford	Brian McGowan	ALP	6.8%
Burwood	Phil O'Neill	ALP	6.9%
Wakehurst	Tom Webster	ALP	7.0%
Burrinjuck	Terry Sheahan	ALP	7.2%
Maitland	Allan Walsh	ALP	7.5%
Hurstville	Kevin Ryan	ALP	9.2%
Blue Mountains	Bob Debus	ALP	9.6%
Kiama	Bill Knott	ALP	9.9%
Safe
Gladesville	Rodney Cavalier	ALP	10.1%
Ryde	Garry McIlwaine	ALP	10.3%
Monaro	John Akister	ALP	11.4%
Woronora	Maurie Keane	ALP	12.1%
Earlwood	Ken Gabb	ALP	12.2%
Wentworthville	Ernie Quinn	ALP	12.6%
Murrumbidgee	Lin Gordon	ALP	13.9%
Ingleburn	Stan Knowles	ALP	14.3%
Parramatta	Barry Wilde	ALP	15.7%
Coogee	Michael Cleary	ALP	15.9%
Kogarah	Bill Crabtree	ALP	16.2%
Tuggerah	Harry Moore	ALP	16.8%
Ashfield	Paul Whelan	ALP	18.2%
Charlestown	Richard Face	ALP	18.3%
Bankstown	Ric Mochalski	ALP	18.7%
Maroubra	Bill Haigh	ALP	18.8%
Broken Hill	Bill Beckroge	ALP	19.0%
Georges River	Frank Walker	ALP	19.0%
Rockdale	Brian Bannon	ALP	19.2%
Seven Hills	Bob Christie	ALP	20.0%
Auburn	Peter Cox	ALP	20.3%
Peats	Keith O'Connell	ALP	20.8%
Penrith	Peter Anderson	ALP	20.8%
Newcastle	Arthur Wade	ALP	20.9%
Lake Macquarie	Merv Hunter	ALP	21.7%
Granville	Pat Flaherty	ALP	22.0%
Blacktown	John Aquilina	ALP	23.1%
Heathcote	Rex Jackson	ALP	23.1%
Waratah	Sam Jones	ALP	23.6%
Drummoyne	Michael Maher	ALP	23.8%
Riverstone	Tony Johnson	ALP	23.9%
Cabramatta	Eric Bedford	ALP	24.0%
Wallsend	Ken Booth	ALP	24.3%
East Hills	Pat Rogan	ALP	24.9%
Merrylands	Jack Ferguson	ALP	25.3%
Bass Hill	Neville Wran	ALP	25.7%
Corrimal	Laurie Kelly	ALP	25.7%
Heffron	Laurie Brereton	ALP	27.5%
St Marys	Ron Mulock	ALP	27.5%
Marrickville	Tom Cahill	ALP	28.0%
Canterbury	Kevin Stewart	ALP	28.6%
Lakemba	Vince Durick	ALP	28.6%
Swansea	Don Bowman	ALP	28.8%
Illawarra	George Petersen	ALP	29.6%
Fairfield	Janice Crosio	ALP	30.2%
Liverpool	George Paciullo	ALP	30.4%
Cessnock	Stan Neilly	ALP	30.5%
Balmain	Roger Degen	ALP	31.0%
Elizabeth	Pat Hills	ALP	34.7%

Liberal/NCP seats (28)
Marginal
Goulburn	Ron Brewer	NCP	1.8%
Castlereagh	Roger Wotton	NCP	3.4%
Orange	Garry West	NCP	3.5%
Willoughby	Peter Collins	LIB	3.7%
Hornsby	Neil Pickard	LIB	3.8%
Byron	Jack Boyd	NCP	4.3%
Fairly safe
Upper Hunter	Col Fisher	NCP	6.4%
Davidson	Terry Metherell	LIB	7.8%
Wagga Wagga	Joe Schipp	LIB	8.1%
Lachlan	Ian Armstrong	NCP	8.7%
Dubbo	Gerry Peacocke	NCP	9.2%
Coffs Harbour	Matt Singleton	NCP	9.3%
Eastwood	Jim Clough	LIB	9.7%
Safe
Gloucester	Leon Punch	NCP	10.2%
Pittwater	Max Smith	LIB	10.9%
Oxley	Jim Brown	NCP	11.5%
The Hills	Fred Caterson	LIB	11.7%
Tamworth	Noel Park	NCP	12.1%
Hawkesbury	Kevin Rozzoli	LIB	12.8%
Barwon	Wal Murray	NCP	13.2%
Lane Cove	John Dowd	LIB	14.1%
Northcott	Jim Cameron	LIB	14.1%
Mosman	David Arblaster	LIB	14.2%
Lismore	Bruce Duncan	NCP	18.9%
Murray	Tim Fischer	NCP	19.1%
Vaucluse	Rosemary Foot	LIB	20.1%
Ku-ring-gai	Nick Greiner	LIB	20.8%
Gordon	Tim Moore	LIB	27.2%
Crossbench seats (2)
North Shore	Ted Mack	IND	4.6% v LIB
South Coast	John Hatton	IND	unopp.

== See also ==
- Candidates of the 1981 New South Wales state election
