= Roy Turner =

Roy Turner may refer to:

- Roy J. Turner (1894–1973), Governor of Oklahoma
- Roy Turner (Australian politician) (1922–2004), Labor member of the New South Wales Legislative Council
- Roy Turner (soccer) (born 1943), former English American soccer player
