= Don Burton =

Donald or Don Burton may refer to:

- Don Burton (1907–after 1986), American owner of radio station WLBC-FM#History
- Don Burton (politician) (1920–2007), Australian legislator
- Donald Burton (1934–2007), English theatre and television actor
- Don Burton (born 1962), Canadian music manager (Dolores O'Riordan#Personal life)
