= Lloyd Coleman =

Australian politician

Lloyd Duncan Watt Coleman (born 9 July 1942) is a former Australian politician. He was a National Party member of the New South Wales Legislative Council from 1991 to 1995.

Born in Wellington, New South Wales, Coleman was a landscaper before entering politics, and a member of Central Council from 1982 to 1992. He also owned a farming and agricultural business. In 1991, he was appointed to the New South Wales Legislative Council to fill the vacancy caused by the departure of Adrian Solomons. He contested the 1995 state election in ninth position on the Coalition ballot, and was defeated.
