= Keith Suter =

Australian social scientist (1948–2025)

Keith Suter AM
- Born: Keith Douglas Suter; 25 July 1948; England
- Died: 10 December 2025 (aged 77)
- Occupations: Consultant; futurist; public speaker

Keith Douglas Suter AM (25 July 1948 – 10 December 2025) was an Australian consultant on strategic planning and a futurist.

== Life and career ==
Suter achieved three doctorates. His first doctorate was about the international law of guerrilla warfare (University of Sydney), the second about the social and economic consequences of the arms race (Deakin University) and the third on scenario planning (Sydney University). He was awarded the Australian Government's Peace Medal in 1986: The International Year of Peace and was Rostrum's "Communicator of the Year" in 1995.

In the 2019 Queen's Birthday Honours, Suter was appointed a Member of the Order of Australia (AM) for "significant service to international relations, and to the Uniting Church in Australia".

Suter was appointed to many roles throughout his career, including chairperson of the International Humanitarian Law Committee of the Australian Red Cross (NSW), chairperson of the International Commission of Jurists (NSW), director of studies at the International Law Association (Australian branch) and managing director of the Global Directions think tank.

Suter was a member of the Club of Rome from 1993 to 2025. The club is "an informal association of independent leading personalities from politics, business and science, men and women who are long-term thinkers interested in contributing in a systemic interdisciplinary and holistic manner to a better world. The Club of Rome members share a common concern for the future of humanity and the planet." The club has only 100 members, with Mikhail Gorbachev having been amongst them. From 2023 to 2025, Suter was the president of the Australian chapter of the Club of Rome.

Suter was a life member of the United Nations Association of Australia in recognition of his service. At various times from 1978 to 1999, he served as the national president of the organisation and took on the roles of Western Australia and New South Wales state president. He was the president of the Centre for Peace and Conflict Studies (1991–1998) at the University of Sydney and a consultant on social policy with the Wesley Mission for 17 years. In addition, he served as a consultant for a number of other organisations with a focus on local and international issues.

Suter was an active member of the Australian Institute of Company Directors. He frequently appeared on radio and television discussing politics and international affairs. He was for many years the foreign affairs editor on the Sunrise breakfast television program on the Seven Network.

Suter died on 10 December 2025 at the age of 77.

== Positions held ==
- President of the Australian Chapter of Club of Rome, the global think tank on economic and environmental matters
- President of the United Nations Association (NSW) and President of the Society for International Development (Sydney Chapter).
- Culture and politics guest speaker at the Wesley Institute, Drummoyne, New South Wales, Australia.
- Member, Australian Foreign Minister’s National Consultative Committee on International Security Issues, Canberra
- Consultant for the Conflict Resolution Network, Sydney
- Director of studies, International Law Association, Australian Branch
- Chairperson, International Humanitarian Law Committee of Australian Red Cross (NSW)
- Chairperson, International Commission of Jurists (NSW)
- Lecturer, Workers' Educational Association, Sydney
- Visiting lecturer, Department of Politics, Macquarie University
- Visiting lecturer, Sydney International Programs, Boston University, United States

== Published works ==
- An International Law of Guerrilla Warfare: The Global Politics of Law-Making, Palgrave Macmillan, London, 1984
- Is there Life after ANZUS: New Directions for the Peace Movement, Pluto, Sydney, 1987
- Antarctica: Private Property or Public Heritage?, Zed, London, 1991
- Global Agenda, Albatross, Sydney, 1994
- Global Change, Albatross, Sydney, 1996
- Legal Studies, Macmillan, Melbourne, 2000
- In Defence of Globalisation, University of NSW Press, Sydney, 2001
- Global Order and Global Disorder: Globalization and the Nation-State, Praeger, Westport, CONN, 2002
- Global Notebook, Random House, Sydney, 2005
- Teach Yourself Globalization, Hodder, London, 2006
- Local Notebook, Random House, Sydney, 2007
- All About Terrorism, Random House, Sydney, 2008
