= Don Day =

Australian politician

The Honourable Don Day

Personal details
- Born: 19 February 1924 Melbourne, Victoria
- Died: 18 May 2010 (aged 86) New South Wales
- Party: Labor Party
- Spouse: Marie Davis
- Children: Jenny, Bill and Suzanne
- Occupation: Motor vehicle dealer and cattle grazier

Donald Day (19 February 1924 – 18 May 2010) was an Australian politician and member of the New South Wales Legislative Assembly representing the electorates of Casino (1971–1981) and Clarence (1981–1984) for the Labor Party. Day held a range of ministerial responsibilities in the government of Neville Wran.

== Early years and background ==
Day was born in Melbourne, Victoria. His father, Alfred Day, was an engineer. Referring to his early years, Day was quoted as:

I grew up in the metropolitan area of Melbourne during the depression. My father deserted us when we were kids, so we had a fairly rough upbringing; my mother had to bring up three of us without the benefit of any deserted wives' pension. We scrabbled very hard and that sort of builds a fire in your guts. It leaves a mark on you really that never leaves you. The scars are there from charity handouts and all those rather soul-destroying experiences. That's why I'll always be Labor.

He was educated at Swinburne Technical College and trained as a fitter and turner. In 1941 he joined the Australian Imperial Forces as a private and later transferred to the Royal Australian Air Force to become a catalina pilot where he met and married Marie Davis.

Following his war service Day and his wife settled in her home town of Maclean and established a car and farm equipment dealership. He joined the Labor party at age 28 and served in local government.

== Political career ==
Day won Labor pre-selection and was subsequently elected as the member for Casino at the 1971 state election; the first time the seat had been held by Labor since the establishment of single member constituencies in 1927. He retained this seat until it was abolished in a redistribution prior to the 1981 state election. He subsequently contested and won the seat of Clarence. With the election of the Wran government in 1976, Day, one of the few rural based elected members of the Labor Party, became the Minister for Decentralisation and Development and Minister for Primary Industries. He continued in rural industry portfolios in the Wran government until his retirement prior to the 1984 state election.

New South Wales Legislative Assembly
New district	Member for Casino; 1971–1981	District abolished
Preceded by Matt Singleton	Member for Clarence; 1981–1984	Succeeded by Ian Causley
Political offices
Preceded by Milton Morris	Minister for Decentralisation and Development; Minister for Primary Industries; 1976–1978	Succeeded by Jack Hallam
Preceded by Bruce Cowan	Minister for Agriculture; 1978–1980	Succeeded by Jack Hallam
Preceded by Jack Hallam as Minister for Decentralisation	Minister for Industrial Development and Decentralisation; 1980–1984	Succeeded by George Paciullo as Minister for Industry and Decentralisation
Preceded by Neville Wran	Minister for Mineral Resources; 1984	Succeeded by Ken Gabb
