= Roger de Bryon-Faes =

Australian politician

Roger August Alfred Faes de Bryon-Faes OAM (2 October 1914 – 12 October 2001) was an Australian politician. He was a Liberal member of the New South Wales Legislative Council from 1961 until 1981.

He was born in Sydney to Roger August Faes, Count de Bryon Faes, who was with the Belgian diplomatic service, and Louisa Martha Clark. He was educated at St Aloysius' College in London and then Temple University in Pennsylvania, receiving his PhD in 1938 as a chemist and chiropodist; he qualified as a Doctor of Podiatric Medicine in Chicago in 1943. On 24 December 1941, he married Mary Doreen Harding, with whom he had a daughter, Monica Mary (born 5 July 1943, died 21 September 2016).

De Bryon-Faes was a foundation member of the Liberal Party's Manly branch. He continued to be active in his various medical positions until 1960, when he was elected to the New South Wales Legislative Council. He was made party whip in 1970. On 30 March 1978 his wife Mary died and on 29 December 1978, he married his second wife, Barbara Lyle. He retired from politics in 1981.

De Bryon-Faes was a member of the first elected Council of Macquarie University in 1967 and continued to hold this position until 1973. He was awarded the Medal of the Order of Australia (OAM) in the 1990 Australia Day Honours for "service to community health and to the New South Wales Parliament".

De Bryon-Faes died in 2001 in Canberra; his memorial service was held on 9 February 2002 at St Mary's Church in North Sydney. A Requiem mass was celebrated for him in St Christopher's Cathedral, Canberra, on 17 October 2001. He had been awarded several Roman Catholic honours; as well as receiving a Hereditary Grand Cross of the Order of St Hubert of Lorraine, he was a Knight Commander of the Sovereign Military Order of Malta (1966), a Knight Grand Cross of the Order of Saint Agatha (1969), and a Knight of the Order of St Lazarus of Jerusalem.
