= Clive Healey =

Australian politician and boilermaker

Clive Healey (4 October 1918 – 16 August 1997) was an Australian politician. He was a Labor member of the New South Wales Legislative Council from 1970 to 1988.

Born in Emmaville, New South Wales, to miner Joseph Healey and Alice Stephenson, he was educated locally before becoming a boilermaker. He enlisted with the AIF in World War II, serving in the Middle East, New Guinea, Morotai and Borneo from 1941 to 1945. He married Gloria Kenning on 16 June 1941, with whom he had two children. After returning from the war, he joined the Labor Party in 1949, and held various positions in the ensuing years, including fourteen years on the party's state executive. He was also a director of the Western Suburbs Hospital for many years.

In 1970, a joint sitting of parliament elected Healey to the New South Wales Legislative Council as a Labor member to a term ending in 1982. The Legislative Council was reformed as a directly elected body and he was elected at the first direct election in 1978 to a 9-year term ending in 1987. In 1982, he was one of three Labor MLCs to vote against their own government's bill to decriminalise homosexual activity between consenting adults in New South Wales. In 1981 the term of members elected in 1978 were extended until 1988. Although he never became a minister in his nearly eighteen years in parliament, he was Chairman of Committees from 8 November 1978 until his retirement on 22 February 1988.

Healey, a Methodist, died at Enfield on 16 August 1997 (aged 78) and his funeral was held at Rookwood Crematorium.

New South Wales Legislative Council
Preceded by Thomas McKay	Chairman of Committees; 1978–1988	Succeeded by Sir Adrian Solomons
