= Vi Lloyd =

Australian politician

Florence Violet Lloyd OBE (17 May 1923 – 11 February 2013) was an Australian politician. She was a Liberal member of the New South Wales Legislative Council from 1973 to 1981.

Born in Sydney, Lloyd was educated to intermediate levels at public schools and became an interior decorator. She married Charles Lloyd, with whom she had three children; her marriage ended in divorce on 7 July 1979. She joined the Liberal Party in 1958, and was Metropolitan Woman vice-president of the New South Wales party from 1971 to 1974. In 1973 she was elected to the New South Wales Legislative Council, serving until 1981. She was appointed an officer of the Order of the British Empire in 1982.
