= Peter McMahon =

Australian politician (1931–2022)

Peter McMahon AM (16 July 1931 – 13 March 2022) was an Australian politician. He was a Labor member of the New South Wales Legislative Council from 1973 to 1981.

== Life and career ==
McMahon was born in Wagga Wagga to Otho Thomas McMahon, of Irish descent, and wife Ida Braunsdorf, of German descent. He was educated at Ladysmith Public School (1936–1939), Mosman Public School (1940–1942) and North Sydney Technical High School (1943–1947), leaving at the age of sixteen. He joined the Citizen Military Forces in 1949 and became a sergeant in the 7th Field Regiment. In 1954, he joined the Labor Party, and visited Britain and Europe in 1961 under a scholarship from the Imperial Relations Trust. He became active in the union movement and internal Labor politics.

In 1973, McMahon was elected to the New South Wales Legislative Council, where he served until 1981. In 1982 he was made a member of the Order of Australia for services to trade unionism and the community. He was Deputy President of the Industrial Relations Commission of New South Wales from 1982 to 1992, and conducted an inquiry into workers' compensation in the State Rail Authority in 1985.

McMahon died on 18 March 2022, at the age of 90.
