= Robert Melville (Australian politician) =

Australian politician

Robert Gavin Melville (9 February 1919 – 18 May 1982) was an Australian politician. He was a Labor member of the New South Wales Legislative Council from 1973 to 1981.

Born in Kempsey to Robert Leslie and Caroline Melville, he was a building contractor and banana grower before entering politics. He served in the 2/13th Battalion for six months, and became an alderman of Kempsey Shire Council in 1954. He was Mayor of Kempsey in 1959. Active in the Labor Party, he was elected to the New South Wales Legislative Council in 1973 and served until 1981. Melville died in Kempsey in 1982.

As a testament to his commitment to the local community, the new high school in Kempsey was named in his honour, Melville High School
