= Social Democratic Party (Australia) =

Defunct Australian political party

- Founder: Ted Roach
- Founded: 1980
- Dissolved: c. 1983
- Headquarters: Sydney, New South Wales, Australia
- Ideology: Social democracy
- Political position: Centre-left

The Social Democratic Party (SDP) was a minor centre-left Australian political party active from 1980 to 1983.

The party was founded by Sydney businessman Ted Roach, a civil engineer living in Mosman, New South Wales. He announced its formation in Canberra on 13 April 1980. The SDP was based on a booklet by Roach titled "Progress Without Poverty and Conflict". It drew inspiration from the citizen-based social democratic parties of Western Europe in Switzerland, Germany and Sweden, as distinct from trade union controlled labour parties in Britain, Australia and New Zealand. It advocated more democracy in society such as citizen initiated referendums, workers elected onto the board of large companies to reduce strikes and overpayment of directors, and harmony between trade unions and big business.

The party stood a candidate at the 1983 Springvale state by-election in Victoria, polling 2.77 percent of the vote. The party unsuccessfully contested the 1983 Australian federal election and then supported the new Prime Minister, Bob Hawke, a social democrat, hoping for political reform.
