= Frank Calabro =

Australian politician

The Hon. Frank Calabro AM

Member of the New South Wales Legislative Council
- In office 12 March 1970 – 22 February 1988

Personal details
- Born: Francesco Calabro; 3 January 1925 Reggio Calabria, Kingdom of Italy
- Died: 13 January 2011 (aged 86)
- Party: Liberal Party
- Spouse: Rosa Polimeni (1963-2011; his death)
- Children: Six
- Occupation: Bus proprietor, Member of Parliament

Francesco "Frank" Calabro, AM (3 January 1925 – 13 January 2011) was an Australian politician. He was a Liberal member of the New South Wales Legislative Council from 1970 to 1988. He was the first Italian-born person of Italian descent elected to any Australian parliament.

Calabro was born in Sant'Alessio in Aspromonte near Reggio Calabria, Kingdom of Italy, to Antonio, a master bootmaker, and Maria Romeo. He arrived in Australia in 1934, having attended school in Italy; he then attended St Mary's Basilica Christian Brothers' at Sydney. In 1948, the family purchased a bus run at Bonnyrigg. In 1959, he was elected to Fairfield Councill, in which year he also became President of the Cabramatta Chamber of Commerce. He married Rosa Polimeni on 20 November 1963; they would have six children.

In 1966, Calabro was briefly Mayor of Fairfield (he served another term in 1969), and in that year was made a Commander of the Order of the Star of Italian Solidarity by the Italian Government. He also became active in the Liberal Party, having formed the Cabramatta branch in 1965. He left Fairfield Council in 1971, but returned in 1974, serving until 1977.

In 1970, Calabro was appointed to the New South Wales Legislative Council as a Liberal member. He served on the Council until 1988. After leaving the Council, he continued to be active in the community; on 1 January 2001 he was awarded the Centenary Medal for services to migrant welfare, and on 9 June 2003 he was made a Member of the Order of Australia for service to the Parliament of New South Wales and the Fairfield community. In May 2013, Frank was added to the New South Wales Government Multicultural Honour Roll for his role in assisting new migrants settle in Australia.
