= Jeff Shaw (politician) =

Australian politician

The Honourable Jeff Shaw QC

Judge of the Supreme Court of New South Wales
- In office 4 February 2003 – 12 November 2004

Minister for Industrial Relations
- In office 4 April 1995 – 28 June 2000
- Premier: Bob Carr
- Preceded by: Kerry Chikarovski (as Minister for Industrial Relations and Employment)
- Succeeded by: John Della Bosca

Attorney-General of New South Wales
- In office 4 April 1995 – 28 June 2000
- Premier: Bob Carr
- Preceded by: John Hannaford
- Succeeded by: Bob Debus

Minister for Fair Trading
- In office 30 April 1998 – 8 April 1999
- Premier: Bob Carr
- Preceded by: Brian Langton
- Succeeded by: John Watkins

Member of New South Wales Legislative Council
- In office 1 May 1990 – 4 July 2000

Personal details
- Born: 10 October 1949 Sydney, Australia
- Died: 11 May 2010 (aged 60) Sydney
- Party: Labor Party
- Spouse: Elizabeth Bryant
- Children: 2 sons
- Education: University of Sydney
- Occupation: barrister, judge, politician

Jeffrey William Shaw, QC (10 October 1949 – 11 May 2010) was an Australian lawyer, judge and Labor politician. A barrister who specialised in industrial law, he was a member of the New South Wales Legislative Council from 1990 to 2000 and served as Attorney General and Minister for Industrial Relations in the government of Bob Carr from 1995 to 2000.

Shaw was appointed a judge of the Supreme Court of New South Wales in 2003 but resigned the following year following a drink-driving incident. He returned to legal practice and teaching, and died in 2010.

== Early life and education ==
Shaw was educated at Boronia Park and Chatswood public schools, and Hunters Hill High School where he was a Sergeant in the school Cadet Corps. He graduated in Arts and Law at the University of Sydney in 1973, and also spent a period studying at Templeton College, Oxford.

He married Elizabeth Bryant on 21 December 1974 and they had two sons.

== Legal career ==
Shaw was admitted as a solicitor of the New South Wales Supreme Court in 1975 and as a barrister of that same court the following year. On 12 November 1986, Shaw was appointed Queen's Counsel. He specialised in industrial law.

== Politics ==
Shaw joined the Labor Party (ALP) in his youth and was active on its left in Sydney. A keen reader and organiser, he became secretary of his local Gladesville branch and was part of a group that ended the right wing's long dominance of NSW Young Labor; he went on to defeat Bob Carr for election as a National Young Labor delegate to the party's national conference. During this period he was an official of the Public Service Association of NSW and later a solicitor with the labour law firm Taylor & Scott.

Shaw was a candidate for the New South Wales Legislative Assembly seat of Eastwood in the 1981 NSW election. He was defeated by the incumbent, veteran Liberal Jim Clough.

Shaw was appointed to fill a casual vacancy in the New South Wales Legislative Council in May 1990, representing the Labor Party. The ALP was in opposition at the time, and Shaw served as Shadow Minister for Industrial Relations and Local Government from 1991 to 1995.

=== Minister ===
Upon the election of the ALP to government in March 1995, Shaw became Attorney General and Minister for Industrial Relations, positions he held until 2000. Shaw was also the Minister for Fair Trading from 1998 to 1999. As Attorney-General he led a push in 1996 to censor online information.

Shaw oversaw a range of law reforms as Attorney General and Minister for Industrial Relations. The Industrial Relations Act 1996 rewrote the state's industrial laws, with changes directed at pay equity, and he later revised its occupational health and safety legislation. He introduced the state's first privacy laws, created the Administrative Decisions Tribunal and a Drug Court, and extended property-law recognition to same-sex couples. He also changed the Dust Diseases Tribunal's rules to allow provisional awards and to let damages survive a claimant's death, reducing the need for deathbed hearings in asbestos cases.

=== Retirement ===
In 1998, Shaw failed to gain a winnable position on the ticket in left wing preselection for the Upper House. His career was eventually "saved" by the right wing Head Office group who moved him to top of the combined ticket.

Clearly disillusioned with factions, Shaw observed at the launch of the Henry Parkes Foundation on 4 June 1999 that "he (Parkes) helped pioneer the faction system that dogs state politics yet – and last year threatened the career of a brilliant Attorney General". Despite his conflicts with factional figures, however, Shaw was regarded as an "iconic figure" within the ALP.

Shaw retired from the Legislative Council in 2000.

== Judicial career ==
Shaw was sworn in as a Judge of the Supreme Court of New South Wales on 4 February 2003.

Despite Shaw being one of their political opponents, the Coalition Opposition welcomed Shaw's appointment to the Supreme Court and did not accuse the Government of appointing Shaw to this position based on partisanship.

On 13 October 2004, Shaw crashed his car into a parked vehicle near his Sydney home. He was taken to hospital, where a blood sample taken for testing recorded a blood alcohol concentration of 0.225. The sample then went missing, prompting an inquiry by the Police Integrity Commission; it was later found in Shaw's possession.

In November 2004, Shaw voluntarily surrendered a second blood sample (not the sample which disappeared in hospital) to the police, resigning from the Supreme Court on 12 November 2004. He was later charged with negligent driving and driving while drunk. Shaw lost his driving licence for a year and was fined A$3,000.

Shaw served as a Supreme Court justice for 647 days (1 year, 9 months and 8 days).

== Post-judicial career ==
After leaving the bench, Shaw was a director of The People's Solicitors, a Sydney law firm. He returned to the University of Sydney as a part-time lecturer on employment law. He was also an adjunct professor of law at the University of Technology, Sydney, a visiting professor at the University of New South Wales, deputy chairman at the Law Reform Commission of New South Wales and a member of the Legal Aid Commission's Panel on Appellate Criminal Law.

== Death ==
Shaw died on 11 May 2010. as a result of complications from pneumonia and other complications.

Parliament of New South Wales
Preceded by Jack Garland	Member of the New South Wales Legislative Council; 1990 – 2000	Succeeded by Amanda Fazio
Political offices
Preceded by John Hannaford	Attorney General of New South Wales; 1995 – 2000	Succeeded by Bob Debus
Preceded by Kerry Chikarovski as Minister for Industrial Relations and Employment	Minister for Industrial Relations; 1995 – 2000	Succeeded by John Della Bosca
Preceded by Brian Langton	Minister for Fair Trading; 1998 – 1999	Succeeded by John Watkins
