= Marie Fisher =

Australian politician

Member of the New South Wales Legislative Council
- In office 7 October 1978 – 22 February 1988

Personal details
- Born: Marie Claire Callinan; 9 June 1931 Paddington, New South Wales
- Died: 17 August 2008 (aged 77) Lismore, New South Wales
- Party: Labor Party
- Spouse: Dugald Fisher
- Children: 3
- Occupation: Schoolteacher

Marie Claire Fisher (9 June 1931 – 17 August 2008) was an Australian politician. She was a Labor member of the New South Wales Legislative Council from 1978 to 1988.

Fisher was born Marie Claire Callinan in Paddington, New South Wales, the daughter of Frank and Claire Callinan. Following her father's abandonment of their family Marie spent time in various orphanages. She was educated at Darlinghurst Public School, Crown Street High School and Sydney Girls High School. Fisher's interest in politics and social justice was sparked by her membership of the Eureka Youth League and her relationship with Edna Ryan, a feminist and trade unionist, who was a friend of her mother. Fisher studied arts at the University of Sydney, and then teaching at the Sydney Teachers College. In 1957, she began teaching English and history at Bourke High School. In 1960, she married Dugald Fisher, a local grazier, with whom she had three children. They lived on 'Galambo', a 24,300 ha pastoral property.

A member of the Labor Party since 1968, Fisher was active in Labor politics in the far west of New South Wales. She served as the Secretary of the Bourke and Cobar branches of the party, as well as Secretary of the Castlereagh State Electoral Council. In 1978, Fisher was elected to the New South Wales Legislative Council as a Labor member. She served until 1988. She died in 2008 at Lismore.
