= Peter Watkins (politician) =

Australian politician (born 1929)

- Born: Peter Francis Watkins; 15 September 1929 (age 96); Campsie
- Occupation: Australian politician
- Known for: Labor member of the New South Wales Legislative Council

Peter Francis Watkins (born 15 September 1929) is a former Australian politician. He was a Labor member of the New South Wales Legislative Council from 1978 to 1987.

== Early years ==
Born in Campsie to Jack and Daisy Watkins, he was educated at St Mel's Catholic School in Campsie and Christian Brothers College in Burwood.

== Career ==
He became a trade union official and was eventually Secretary of the New South Wales Clothing Trades Union.

== Family life ==
On 29 November 1952 he married Shirley May, with whom he had five children.

Watkins had joined the Labor Party in 1952, and in 1978 was elected to the New South Wales Legislative Council. He served until his resignation in 1987, when he was replaced by Tony Kelly.
