= John Morris (Australian politician) =

Australian politician

Senator for New South Wales
- In office 1 July 1985 – 30 June 1990

Personal details
- Born: 12 June 1936 Young Wallsend, New South Wales, Australia
- Died: 8 February 2013 (aged 76) Wallsend, New South Wales, Australia
- Party: Labor
- Spouse: Margaret Pettigrew (m. 1957)
- Occupation: Unionist

John Joseph Morris (12 June 1936 – 8 February 2013) was an Australian trade unionist and politician. He was a long-serving official of unions associated with the liquor industry in New South Wales, including the Federated Liquor and Allied Industries Employees' Union and Liquor Hospitality and Miscellaneous Workers' Union, holding various positions at state and federal level from the 1970s to the 2000s. He also represented the Australian Labor Party (ALP) in the New South Wales Legislative Council (1976–1984) and as a Senator for New South Wales (1985–1990). He retired from the Senate before the 1990 federal election following controversies over his attendance record, lifestyle and alleged union misconduct.

== Early life ==
Morris was born on 12 June 1936 in Young Wallsend, New South Wales. He was the youngest of six children born to Minnie Doreen (née Gavin) and Thomas Wallace Hope Morris. His family was active in the labour movement; his father worked as a boilermaker and his grandfather Thomas Morris had represented the ALP on the Fairfield Municipal Council.

After leaving school, Morris began working at the abattoir in Homebush as an apprentice slaughterman. He lost his apprenticeship due to a sporting injury and instead began working in the hospital industry, including at the bowls club in Beecroft.

== Union movement ==
Morris joined the Federated Liquor and Allied Industries Employees' Union of Australia – commonly known as the Liquor Trades' Union (LTU) – as a young man. He was elected to the union's state management committee in 1965 and began working as a paid organiser the following year.

In 1970, with the support of Neville Wran and Jim McClelland, Morris successfully sued the LTU in the Commonwealth Industrial Court, following allegations that the dominant faction associated with the Communist Party had unlawfully interfered in membership ballots. The court found that widespread misconduct had occurred and voided the union's 1969 election results. Morris led a "New Deal" ticket in the subsequent elections and was elected as state secretary, in what Graham Richardson later described as "one of the most bitter union fights in history".

Morris remained as state secretary of the LTU until 1981, when he was elected state president. He also served terms as national president of the union (1972–1975, 1984–1987) and as president of the Asia-Pacific division of the International Union of Food, Agricultural, Hotel, Restaurant, Catering, Tobacco and Allied Workers' Associations (1980–1985). Morris remained as LTU president throughout his terms in the Senate. The LTU merged into the Liquor Hospitality and Miscellaneous Workers' Union (LHMWU) in 1992, after which he became president of the new union's liquor division. In 1997, following an LHMWU restructure, Morris was given a redundancy package and instead made "honorary president" of the division.

Morris was known early in his career as a "strong defender of working conditions" with a "powerful appeal for the rank and file in the dispersed and casualised industry". In 1971 his union boycotted the Springbok tour in protest at apartheid. He led strike action on a number of occasions, including major strikes of hotel workers in 1977 and 1978. In 1986 he led a sit-in at Tooheys Brewery to protest superannuation entitlements.

In the late 1980s, allegations emerged from LTU opponents that Morris had neglected his duties as union president. After a narrow victory at the union's 1989 election he faced a legal challenge to the results as well as allegations of accounting irregularities in a union slush fund. The Sydney Morning Herald also reported that the LTU had employed several of his family members. In 1996, an Industrial Relations Commission of New South Wales judge criticised the union for "failing to apply for pay rises its membership had been legally entitled to for almost a decade" and alleged an "almost total lack of interest" from union officials in their employees. He was subject to further criticism in 1998 after it was reported that, despite receiving a redundancy package from the union, he had continued to receive substantial expense allowances and a free vehicle.

== State politics ==
Morris joined the Rydalmere branch of the Australian Labor Party in 1962. He joined the party's state administrative committee in 1971 and the state finance committee in 1980.

In 1976, Morris was elected to the New South Wales Legislative Council, as one of the final indirectly elected members prior to the Legislative Council's reconstitution as a fully elective body in 1978. He did not face direct election until the 1984 state election, when he was re-elected in fourth position on the ALP's statewide ticket. He resigned less than a year later to contest the next federal election.

Morris was associated with the right faction of the ALP in New South Wales (later known as Centre Unity), initially aligned with Graham Richardson and Paul Keating. In 1979 he unsuccessfully sought to become state president but was vetoed by Richardson, leading to a factional split in which Morris and the LTU sought to obtain a balance of power between the right and left factions. Morris's Senate preselection in 1984 was reportedly due to a factional deal in which the LTU agreed to realign itself with Centre Unity.

== Federal politics ==
Morris was elected to the Senate at the 1984 federal election, winning a term beginning on 1 July 1985. He spoke infrequently in the Senate, rarely engaging in debate although he was frequently tasked with posing Dorothy Dixers to government ministers. He did serve on a number of Senate committees, including as chair of the Senate Select Committee on Animal Welfare (1987–1989) and the Joint Statutory Committee on the Australian Security Intelligence Organisation (1988–1990).

Beginning in 1989, Morris was the subject of sustained criticism from the media and political opponents over his speaking and attendance record in the Senate, with The Daily Telegraph dubbing him "the silent senator" and Liberal senator Michael Baume alleging that he had missed 40 percent of votes in the Senate and missed 25 percent of meetings for Senate committees he chaired. He was nonetheless re-elected as the ALP's number-one Senate candidate in New South Wales in a preselection ballot in June 1989.

In February 1990, Morris announced that he would not recontest his seat at the 1990 federal election, with his term consequently expiring on 30 June 1990. In May 1990, the Sydney Morning Herald reported that "during his years as an LTU official and senator, Morris and his wife had purchased twenty-three properties across NSW and the ACT, one of which was sold in 1989 for $1.8 million". The Australian Financial Review attributed his resignation from the ticket to "public attacks over neglect of union members and his affluent lifestyle".

== Personal life ==
In 1957, Morris married Margaret Pettigrew, with whom he had two children. He and his wife were deeply involved in the greyhound racing industry, with his wife being a registered trainer. He served on the boards of the Greyhound Racing Authority and the Wentworth Park Sporting Complex.

Morris died on 8 February 2013, aged 76, while watching a greyhound race at The Gardens Greyhound and Sporting Complex in Newcastle.
