= Lloyd Lange =

Australian politician

William Lloyd Lange (27 June 1937 – 24 November 2013) was an Australian politician. He was a Liberal member of the New South Wales Legislative Council from 1974 to 1986, serving as Leader of the Opposition in the Legislative Council from 1981 to 1984, and as Opposition Spokesman for Minerals and Energy and Deputy Leader of the Liberal Party from 1984 to 1986.

Lange was born in Wagga Wagga to Herbert Norman Lange and Dorothy Olive White. He was educated at Wagga Wagga High School and Sydney Technical College, training as an accountant. On 22 November 1963 he married Pamela Marion Daley, with whom he had five children. In 1970 he became Chairman of the Liberal Party's New South Wales Rural Committee and the party's Country Vice President.

In 1974, Lange was elected to the New South Wales Legislative Council. He became the Opposition's Leader in the upper house in 1981, and in 1984 became Deputy Leader and Spokesman for Minerals and Energy. He resigned from the Council in 1986. He was appointed Chairman of the New South Wales Coal Compensation Board and Deputy Chairman of the New South Wales Government Insurance Office in 1988. He left the Insurance Office in 1992 to become Director of Abigail Group Ltd. He was also involved with Sydney Airports Corporation as director since 1998.
