= Nathanael Orr =

Australian politician

Member of the New South Wales Legislative Council
- In office 23 Apr 1976 – 5 Mar 1984

Personal details
- Born: Nathanael Montgomery Orr; 8 October 1917 Parkes, New South Wales, Australia
- Died: 16 April 2016 (aged 98) Parkes, New South Wales, Australia
- Party: Liberal Party
- Spouse: Mary Patricia Whitnell (m. 1946; died 2006)
- Children: 4

Nathanael Montgomery Orr (8 October 1917 – 16 April 2016) was an Australian politician. He was a Liberal member of the New South Wales Legislative Council from 1976 to 1984.

Born to John and Margaret Orr in Parkes, he left school at the age of thirteen to work on his father's property during the Great Depression. He qualified as a motor mechanic, and was also accredited as a lay preacher with the Presbyterian and later the Uniting Church. In 1941 he volunteered as a mechanic for the armed forces, serving in north Queensland and the Torres Strait until the end of World War II in 1945. On 1 August 1946 he married Mary Patricia Whitnell, with whom he had four children.

Orr joined the Liberal Party on its formation in 1945 and was the president of the Parkes branch from 1946 to 1973. He was president of the Dubbo Electoral Conference (1950–1975), president of the Western Regional Conference (1950–1974) and a member of the State Executive (1950–1974). In 1976 he was elected to the New South Wales Legislative Council, where he served until 1984.
