= Fred Hankinson =

Australian politician

Frederick Charles Hankinson (21 June 1925 – 7 October 1997) was an Australian politician. He was a Labor member of the New South Wales Legislative Council from 1984 to 1991.

Hankinson was born in Auburn, New South Wales, and was educated locally at public schools. After leaving school he became a meatworker, and became active in the union movement. He joined the Labor Party in 1959 and was State President of the Australian Metal Industry Employees Union and an executive member of the New South Wales Trades and Labour Council. He was also president of the Auburn State Electoral Council for five years. In 1984, he was appointed to the New South Wales Legislative Council after the resignation of Paul Landa; he served until 1991.

Hankinson died at Camperdown in 1997. He was cremated at Rookwood Cemetery.
