= Richard Killen =

Australian politician

Richard Weir Killen (26 January 1930 – 28 May 2012) was an Australian politician. He was a National Party member of the New South Wales Legislative Council from 1981 to 1991.

Born in Homebush, New South Wales, he was educated at Blackfriars Correspondence School (1934–42) and Sydney Grammar School (1942–46), receiving his Intermediate and leaving certificates. In 1946 he became a jackeroo in New South Wales and Queensland, and in 1948 joined the Country Party. In 1954, he married Lesley Cameron, with whom he had two children. He also was briefly the manager of "Mollee", a property near Narrabri and Tambar Springs, before managing "Papanui" at Merriwa from 1954 to 1958. He became secretary of the Tambar Springs Branch of the Country Party in 1955 and chairman in 1962, and was also secretary (1961–63) and chairman (1963–68) of the Upper Hunter State Electoral Council and chairman (1968–72) of the Burrendong State Electoral Council. He was secretary and then chairman of the party's Merriwa Branch 1965–77 and sat on the New South Wales Central Executive 1965–83, including a period as chairman 1978–83. He was the Australian vice-president of the party from 1978 to 1983.

In 1981, Killen was elected to the New South Wales Legislative Council as a National Party member. He served until 1991.
