= John Holt (Australian politician) =

Australian politician

Walter John Holt QC (7 May 1929 – 9 March 2012) was an Australian politician and judge. He was a Liberal member of the New South Wales Legislative Council from 1972 to 1984, and was Deputy Leader of the Opposition in the Upper House from 1976 to 1977.

Holt was born in Sydney, the son of Henry Thomas Eulert Holt QC, a judge of the District Court of New South Wales, and Gladys Amelia Withycombe. He was educated at Barker College in Hornsby from 1938 to 1944 and at the University of Sydney, where he was awarded a Bachelor of Law in 1952. In 1948 he joined the Liberal Party. An RAAF reserve, he was a pilot officer with the Sydney University Squadron in 1952, and was called to the bar in 1954. In 1959, he was elected to Woollahra Council; he was deputy mayor in 1963 and served until 1965. He married Eleanor Fell in 1960, with whom he had three children, Phoebe, Henry and Patrick.

He was president of the Liberal Party's Edgecliff branch in 1962, and directed the campaigns for the state seat of Bligh in 1965, 1968 and 1971, and for the federal seat of St George in 1972. In 1967 he became vice-president of the Civic Reform Association. In 1972 Holt was elected to the New South Wales Legislative Council. In 1976, the year he and his wife Eleanor divorced, he became Deputy Leader of the Opposition in the Legislative Council, holding that position until 1977. In 1980 he married Judith Little. He was appointed an Officer of the French National Order of Merit in 1982 and also became a QC in that year. Holt left the Council in 1984.

In 1987, Holt's second wife Judith died. He married Heather Lise Barritt in 1990. In 1993 he was appointed a Judge of the District Court, holding that position until 2002.
