= Jack Garland (Australian politician) =

Australian trade unionist and politician

The Honourable John 'Jack' Garland

Member of the New South Wales Legislative Council
- In office 1981–1990
- Succeeded by: Jeff Shaw

Personal details
- Born: 8 April 1922 Sydney, New South Wales
- Died: 3 September 1993 (aged 71) Sydney, New South Wales
- Party: Labor Party
- Occupation: Toolmaker

John Davis "Jack" Garland (8 April 1922 – 3 September 1993) was an Australian trade unionist and politician. He was a Labor member of the New South Wales Legislative Council from 1981 to 1990.

== Biography ==
Garland was born in Sydney, and after leaving school became a toolmaker. He was active in the trade union movement, serving as a shop steward and later a district official in the Amalgamated Engineering Union (AEU). Garland was elected National Secretary of the union in 1957 and continued in the role following its amalgamation into the Amalgamated Metal Workers Union in 1972. Garland held the post until 1981, when he was elected to the New South Wales Legislative Council for the Labor Party (ALP). He held ALP membership for over forty years, and was a delegate to State and Federal Electoral Councils, as well as a delegate to the party's national conference for 12 years. Garland served five years as vice-president of the New South Wales branch of the party. He served in the legislative council until his resignation in 1990, when he was replaced by Jeff Shaw.

Garland died in Sydney in 1993.
