= Derek Freeman (politician) =

Australian politician and dentist (1924–2018)

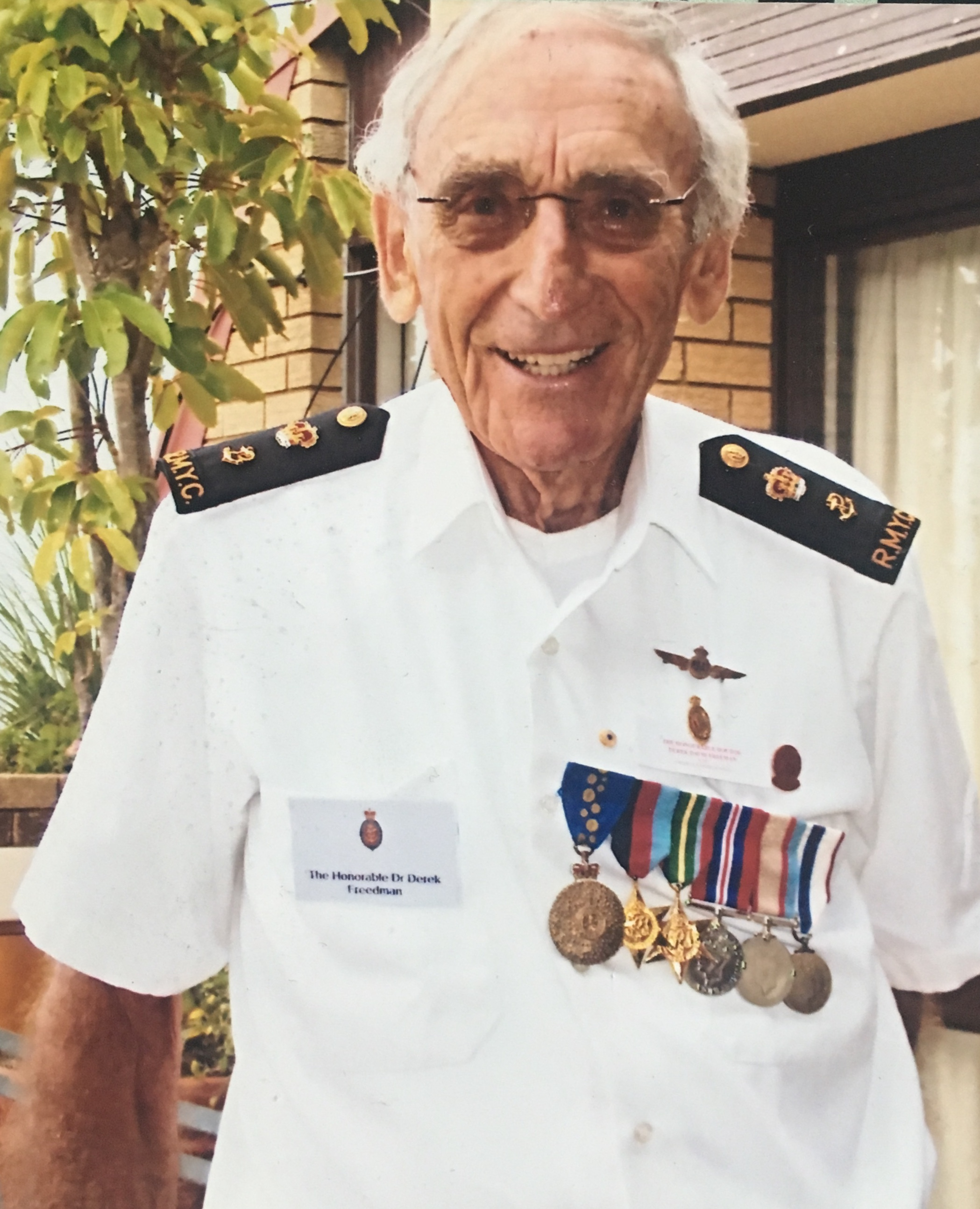
Derek Freeman Profile Image

Derek David Freeman AM (16 May 1924 – 2 February 2018) was an Australian politician and dentist. He was a Liberal member of the New South Wales Legislative Council from 1973 to 1981 and from 1981 to 1984.

Freeman was born in Sydney. He attended Bellevue Hill Public School and Sydney Boys' High School in 1936–41, before studying dentistry at the University of Sydney and the University of Toronto's dental school (then part of the Royal College of Dental Surgeons). He served in the RAAF from 1945 to 1946. On 23 August 1950 he married Phyllis, with whom he had four daughters. He ran a private dental practice, but was a fellow of the International College of Dentists and the Royal Australian College of Dental Surgeons and a president of the New South Wales branch of the Australian Dental Association. In 1960 he joined the Liberal Party, and was Eastern Metropolitan Regional President in 1972.

He was chair of the Fluoride Committee of the Australian Dental Association launched in 1958. Given fluoride's proven significant impact on oral health, he spearheaded the campaign for its widespread adoption, and worked tirelessly over the next 15 years, addressing and educating scores of meetings, officials and the public on the benefits of this landmark public health initiative.

In 1973, Freeman was elected to the New South Wales Legislative Council as a Liberal member. He served until his defeat at the 1981 state election, but was re-appointed later that year to fill the vacancy caused by the death of Fergus Darling. He left politics in 1984.

He was awarded the AM (Member in the General Division of the Order of Australia) in 1982 for his service to dentistry.

Freeman died in February 2018 at the age of 93.
