= Bill Sandwith =

Australian politician

William John Sandwith (29 October 1922 – 8 July 1999) was an Australian politician. He was a Liberal member of the New South Wales Legislative Council from 1976 to 1984.

Sandwith was born in Sydney, and worked as an engineer and company director before entering politics. He was a director of the New South Wales Permanent Building Society, the New South Wales Group of Terminating Building Societies, the World Permanent Building Society, Home Owners Insurance Pty Ltd, Residential Insurances Pty Ltd, Management and Financial Services Pty Ltd, and St George District Hospital. In 1960 he joined the Liberal Party, and held executive positions at local, state and federal level, serving on the state council from 1966 to 1976. In 1976 he was elected to the New South Wales Legislative Council. He was Opposition Whip from 1981 until 1984, when he left politics. Sandwith died in 1999 at Kyle Bay.
