= Peter Philips (politician) =

Australian politician

Peter Sydney Maitland Philips AM (12 May 1927 – 11 May 2009) was an Australian politician. He was a Liberal member of the New South Wales Legislative Council from 1976 to 1988.

Philips was born in Bellevue Hill. He was educated at Barker College in Hornsby from 1939 to 1944. He served in the AIF from 1945 to 1946, and later worked as a solicitor. He was a director of Macquarie Equities and Marlar International, and founded Merchant Bank and Philips First City Brandt, which later became Citinational. Active in the Liberal Party, Philips was a president of the electoral councils for the federal seat of Bradfield and the state seat of Hornsby.

In 1976, Philips was appointed as a Liberal member to the New South Wales Legislative Council. He was divorced from his first wife on 26 April 1979, and married his second wife Helen Larcombe in December 1980. Philips served in the council until his retirement in 1988. He was chairman of the Odyssey House McGrath Foundation from 1989 to 2000. Philips died in 2009 in Sydney.
