= Norm King =

Australian politician

Norman Leo King (24 June 1919 – 4 August 1992) was an Australian politician. He was a Labor member of the New South Wales Legislative Council from 1978 to 1988.

King was born in Junee, and was educated at Yanco Agricultural High School. He served as part of the AIF in World War II from 1940 to 1946, and was a prisoner of war at Singapore. After his return, he became a grazier breeding merino sheep. A member of the Labor Party, he was president of the Crookwell branch from 1971, and was secretary of the Rural Committee from 1979 to 1982. He also served on the electoral councils for the federal seat of Eden-Monaro and the state seat of Monaro.

King was elected to the New South Wales Legislative Council at the 1978 state election, the first time the council was elected directly by the public. He served until 1988.
