= George Brenner (politician) =

Australian politician (1929–2021)

George Brenner (17 June 1929 – 30 December 2021) was an Australian politician. He was a Labor member of the New South Wales Legislative Council from 1981 to 1991.

Brenner was born in Márkó, Hungary, and was educated in Veszprém from 1940 to 1947, before migrating to Australia. He worked as a jackeroo, plant operator and service station proprietor, and married Betty on 8 January 1955 (they had three daughters). He joined the Jugiong branch of the Labor Party in 1964, and served as a councillor on Demondrille Shire Council (1971–74) and Harden Shire Council (1974–75, 1977–83). He was the Labor candidate for the federal seat of Hume in 1975 and 1977, and was involved in the electoral councils for Hume and the state seat of Burrinjuck.

In 1981, Brenner was elected to the New South Wales Legislative Council as a Labor member. He served until 1991, including a period (1984–91) on the Joint Standing Committee Upon Road Safety.
