= Joe Thompson (Australian politician) =

Australian politician

Joe Slater Thompson AM (25 July 1923 – 14 May 2005) was an Australian politician. He was a Labor member of the New South Wales Legislative Council from 1974 to 1988.

Thompson was born in Manly and attended Christian Brothers College there before studying at Harvard as a Churchill Fellow. He then became a member of the Administrative Staff College Association, having completed a senior administration course at Mount Eliza. Afterwards Thompson served in the RAAF from 1942 to 1946 as a pilot in the 460 Squadron, and on his return became involved in trade unionism.

Thompson had joined the Labor Party in 1947 as a member of the Bellingen branch. He held various positions (including president, vice-president and secretary) in the Padstow, Belfield, Campsie and Bellingen branches, and was an executive member of the New South Wales branch from 1969 to 1970. He was elected to the New South Wales Legislative Council in 1974, serving until his retirement in 1988.

Thompson died in 2005 at Coffs Harbour.
