= John Matthews (Australian politician) =

Australian politician (1928–2019)

John Cyril James Matthews (11 February 1928 – 19 August 2019) was an Australian politician. He was a Liberal member of the New South Wales Legislative Council from 1981 to 1991.

Matthews was born in Sydney to Cyril Claude Matthews, a rubber technician, and Helen Cummings. He was educated at private schools Christian Brothers College, Rose Bay; St Stanislaus' College (Bathurst), and then the University of Sydney, where he studied for a Master of Pharmacy 1947–50. He worked as a pharmacist, and married Dympna Guthrie on 11 April 1955 at Bathurst; they would have six children. In 1965 he was elected to Bathurst City Council and was immediately elected mayor; he held both positions until 1976, and also served on Southern Mitchell Count Council 1968–77. In 1969 he established Devro Pty Ltd and Uncle Ben's Pet Foods Bathurst, and in 1970 opened Clyde Industries Ltd. He was a member of Mitchell College of Advanced Education (1972–76) and the New South Wales Pharmacy Guild (1967–80). In 1973 he became a member of the state executive of the Liberal Party, becoming country vice-president in 1974 and state treasurer in 1979.

In 1981, Matthews was elected to the New South Wales Legislative Council as a Liberal member. In 1984 he became Opposition Finance Spokesman, a position he held until 1987. Matthews left the Council in 1991.
