= Toby MacDiarmid =

Australian politician

Finlay Melrose "Toby" MacDiarmid OBE (9 May 1925 – 18 April 2003) was an Australian politician. He was a member of the New South Wales Legislative Council from 1973 to 1988, serving as a member of the National Party (formerly the Country Party) until 1985 and thereafter as an Independent.

MacDiarmid was born in Queanbeyan, and was educated at Sydney Church of England Grammar School. Although he began studying veterinary science at the University of Sydney, he did not graduate. He played rugby for the Sydney team and was a reserve for the New South Wales team before serving in the RAAF from 1945 to 1946. He subsequently took over his father's Hereford stud, moving it from Burra to Holbrook. From 1968 to 1972 he was President of the Graziers' Association.

In 1973, MacDiarmid was elected as a Country Party member to the New South Wales Legislative Council. He served as a backbencher until April 1985, when he resigned from the party to sit as an independent; he left the Council in 1988. MacDiarmid died in 2003.
