= Fergus Darling =

Australian politician

Fergus John Darling (15 December 1920 – 3 October 1981) was an Australian politician. He was a Liberal member of the New South Wales Legislative Council from 1976 to 1981.

Born in Perth, Darling served in World War II, and was taken as a prisoner of war; he was held in a German army camp for three years. Following his return in 1946, he became an active member of the Apex Club of Perth, and also joined the Liberal Party. He worked as an industrial advocate with the Western Australian Employers Federation from 1935, and in 1957 was elected to Nedlands City Council; he served seven years as deputy mayor. In 1966, Darling relocated to Sydney to become executive director of the New South Wales Employers' Federation.

In 1976, Darling was elected to the New South Wales Legislative Council as a Liberal member. He retired from his position with the Employers' Federation in 1980 due to ill health. He died in 1981 at Seaforth while still an MLC; his seat was filled by former MLC Derek Freeman.
