= Ken Reed (Australian politician) =

Australian politician

Kenneth Warren Reed (born 22 July 1944) is a former Australian politician. He was a Labor member of the New South Wales Legislative Council from 1981 to 1991.

Reed was born in Ryde, and worked in journalism, photography and advertising for the Hastings Gazette before acquiring a beef cattle property. He also sat on Hastings Municipal Council. A member of the Labor Party, he was elected to the New South Wales Legislative Council in 1981, serving until 1991.
