= Bill Kennedy (politician) =

Australian politician

James William Kennedy (8 July 1919 – 3 March 2001) was an Australian politician and a Country Party member of the New South Wales Legislative Council from 1971 to 1984.

Kennedy was born in Murrumbeena, Melbourne. He served in the Royal Australian Air Force from 1940 to 1946 and joined the Country Party on his return in 1947, then farmed and directed a company. In 1956 he was elected to Taree Municipal Council. He was its mayor and served on several local councils from 1965 to 1971.

In 1971, Kennedy was elected to the New South Wales Legislative Council. He served until 1984 and died in Taree in 2001.
