= Roy Turner (Australian politician) =

Australian politician

Roy Frederick Turner AM (7 September 1922 – 15 June 2004) was an Australian politician. He was a Labor member of the New South Wales Legislative Council from 1976 to 1984.

Turner was born in Surry Hills, and was educated at the University of Sydney where he received a Bachelor of Law. He worked as a solicitor, establishing Turner, Freeman and Partners as his firm. In 1939 he joined the Labor Party. In 1958 he was a member of the Sydney Mental Health Tribunal, and from 1963 was a member of the Council of the Law Society of New South Wales. The author of several books, he was also active in Aboriginal affairs, founding the Co-operative for Aboriginals in 1956 and the Aboriginal Legal Aid Service in 1971. In 1976 he was elected to the New South Wales Legislative Council serving until 1984. He died in 2004 at Strathfield.

He visited the Soviet Union in 1978 and wrote a book based on his observations titled Law in the USSR.

Turner was appointed a Member of the Order of Australia in the 1986 Australia Day Honours for service to the community.
