= Don Burton (politician) =

Australian politician (1920–2007)

Donald Ross Burton AM (3 March 1920 – 17 May 2007) was an Australian politician. He was a Labor member of the New South Wales Legislative Council from 1976 to 1984. Burton was born in Traralgon in Victoria, where he was educated at state schools. In 1941 he enlisted with the Civilian Military Forces, moving to the AIF in 1943. He left the armed services in 1946, and renewed his membership of the Labor Party (he had first joined in 1940) in 1948. On 30 November 1946, he married Claire Miller at Ashfield; they had one son. In 1950, he was made assistant secretary of the Vehicle Builders' Union, and in 1958 became New South Wales secretary of the Association of Architects, Engineers, Surveyors and Draughtsmen. He rose to further prominence in 1968 as National Secretary of the Australasian Transport Officers Federation.

In 1976, Burton was elected to the New South Wales Legislative Council as a Labor member. He served as Government Whip from 1981 to 1984. He left the Council in 1984. Burton died at the age of 87 in Tuncurry.
