= Bryan Vaughan =

Australian politician

Bryan Henry Vaughan (2 February 1931 – 17 June 2015) was an Australian politician and lawyer. He was a Labor member of the New South Wales Legislative Council from 1981 to 1999.

The son of jeweller Henry Michael Vaughan and his wife Myra Kelly, Bryan Vaughan was born in Sydney. He was educated at Marcellan College at Randwick before achieving a Bachelor of Laws at the University of Sydney. In October 1950 he joined the Labor Party. He was employed in various legal firms before establishing Bryan Vaughan & Co. in 1965.

In 1981, Vaughan was elected to the New South Wales Legislative Council as a Labor member. He was Shadow Minister for Small Business, Industrial Development and Tourism from 1990 to 1995 and Deputy Leader of the Opposition in the Senate from 1991 to 1995. In 1994 he was awarded the Order of the Lithuanian Grand Duke Gediminas. Vaughan retired in 1999. He died in Sydney in 2015.
