= Jack Doohan (politician) =

Australian politician

The Honourable Jack Doohan OBE

Member of the New South Wales Legislative Council
- In office 6 December 1978 – 3 May 1991
- Preceded by: Sir John Fuller

Personal details
- Born: John James Doohan; 25 February 1920 Bourke, New South Wales, Australia
- Died: 16 June 2007 (aged 87) Sydney, New South Wales, Australia
- Party: The Nationals
- Occupation: Grazier

Military service
- Allegiance: Australia
- Branch/service: Australian Army
- Years of service: 1942–1945

John James Doohan, OBE (25 February 1920 – 16 June 2007) was an Australian politician. He was a National Party member of the New South Wales Legislative Council from 1978 to 1991.

Doohan was born in Bourke, New South Wales, and was educated at St Joseph's College, Hunters Hill before becoming a grazier at Louth. He served in the 2nd Australian Imperial Force from 1942 to 1945 and in the 18th Ord Ammo Coy in New Guinea. He married Mena Beryl, with whom he had two children. He was a member of the Central Council (1957–78), including two periods as Vice-President (1965–68, 1971–73) and one as Treasurer (1969–71). He was also involved in many committees and organisations to do with the wool farming industry.

In 1978, he was elected to the New South Wales Legislative Council for the National Party. He was Vice-Chairman of the NSW National Party from 1979 to 1982, and served in the council until 1991.
