= Barney French =

Australian politician

Henry Bernard "Barney" French AM (7 August 1922 – 10 January 2005) was an Australian politician. He was a Labor member of the New South Wales Legislative Council from 1973 to 1991.

French was born in Camden, New South Wales, and served in the merchant navy from 1938 to 1945. In 1953 he became Assistant Secretary of the New South Wales Branch of the Australian Workers' Union, and became Federal President in 1970, serving until 1980. He was married to Pat, with whom he had four children. An active member of the Labor Party in the federal electorate of Blaxland and the state seat of Bankstown, he was vice-president of the ALP for ten years. In 1973 he was elected as a Labor member to the New South Wales Legislative Council. He was Government Whip from 1984 to 1988 and Opposition Whip from 1988 to 1989. He retired in 1991.

In 1985 French was appointed a Member of the Order of Australia for " service to the trade union movement ". He received the Centenary Medal in 2001.

French died in Sydney in 2005.
