= Ann Symonds =

Australian politician (1939–2018)

Ann Symonds AM

Member of the New South Wales Legislative Council
- In office 8 September 1982 – 30 April 1998
- Preceded by: Peter Baldwin
- Succeeded by: Carmel Tebbutt

Personal details
- Born: Elizabeth Ann Burley; 12 July 1939 Murwillumbah, New South Wales, Australia
- Died: 15 November 2018 (aged 79) Sydney, New South Wales, Australia
- Party: Labor Party
- Spouse: Maurice Symonds (m. 1965)
- Children: Five
- Education: University of New South Wales

Elizabeth Ann Symonds AM (/ˈsɪməndz/; née Burley; 12 July 1939 – 15 November 2018) was an Australian politician. She was a Labor member of the New South Wales Legislative Council from 1982 to 1998.

== Biography ==
Born in Murwillumbah, Ann Burley trained as a teacher at Armidale Teacher's College and the University of New South Wales. On 16 January 1965, she married Maurice Symonds, with whom she had five children. She joined the Labor Party in 1967. In 1974, she was elected to Waverley Municipal Council, becoming the municipality's first female Deputy Mayor in 1977.

In 1982, Symonds was appointed to the New South Wales Legislative Council as a Labor member following the resignation of Peter Baldwin, who was contesting the federal seat of Sydney in the upcoming federal election. She held her seat until 1998, when she resigned; the subsequent vacancy was filled by Carmel Tebbutt.

She was a founder of the Australian Parliamentary Group on Drug Law Reform (APGDLR), a cross party group of 100 MPs from State and Commonwealth parliaments. The group was set up in 1993 after a meeting in Canberra convened by Symonds and Michael Moore (ACT Assembly).

Symonds was Patron of SHINE for Kids, a charity supporting children which family members in the criminal justice system, from 1999 until her death. She was appointed a Member of the Order of Australia in the 2015 Australia Day Honours for "significant service to social justice, particularly through drug law reform, and to the Parliament of New South Wales".

Symonds died in St Vincent's Private Hospital, Darlinghurst, on 15 November 2018 after a long illness. The notice of her death ended with the epithet, "Well-behaved women rarely make history".
