= Dorothy Isaksen =

Australian politician (1930–2023)

Dorothy Isaksen AM

Member of the New South Wales Legislative Council
- In office 6 November 1978 – 22 February 1988
- Preceded by: Deirdre Grusovin
- In office 4 July 1990 – 5 March 1999

Personal details
- Born: Dorothy May Shepherd; 13 April 1930 North Sydney, New South Wales, Australia
- Died: 29 August 2023 (aged 93)
- Party: Labor Party
- Spouse: Neville Isaksen
- Children: Two

Dorothy May Isaksen AM (née Shepherd; 13 April 1930 – 29 August 2023) was an Australian politician. She was a Labor member of the New South Wales Legislative Council from 1978 to 1988 and from 1990 to 1999.

== Life and career ==
Dorothy May Shepherd was born in North Sydney, the daughter of Edward Chapman Shepherd, a foreman, and his wife Beatrice Taylor. She was educated at Catholic convents at Lavender Bay and Penrith before attending the Metropolitan Business College in 1945. She was employed in the Valuer General's Department 1946–50 and the Family Welfare Bureau 1952–55, working as a stenographer. In 1952 she married Neville Isaksen, with whom she had two daughters.

Isaksen joined the Labor Party in 1955, and held various positions on the Youth Council Executive (1957–58), the New South Wales Central Executive (1970–71) and the Administration Committee (1976–79). She was President of the New South Wales Labor Women's Committee 1973–79 and Secretary (1977–79) and President (1975–77) of the National Labor Women's Committee. She was the first woman state organiser for the Labor Party. In 1978 she was elected to the New South Wales Legislative Council, serving until her defeat in 1988. She returned to the Council in 1990, when she was appointed to the casual vacancy caused by the resignation of Deirdre Grusovin. She served as Government Whip from 1995 to 1999, when she retired from politics. She was made a life member of the Labor Party in 2002.

Isaksen was made a Member of the Order of Australia (AM) in the 2018 Australia Day Honours, for significant service to the Parliament of New South Wales, as an advocate for gender equality in politics, as a mentor, and to the community.

Isaksen died on 29 August 2023, at the age of 93.
