= Ron Dyer =

Australian politician

The Honourable Ron Dyer OAM

Member of the New South Wales Legislative Council
- In office 14 September 1979 – 28 February 2003
- Preceded by: John Ducker

Personal details
- Born: 11 April 1943 (age 83) St Leonards, New South Wales, Australia
- Party: Labor Party
- Spouse: Dorothy Jones (m. 1973)

Ronald David Dyer OAM (born 11 April 1943) is a former Australian politician. Born in St Leonards, he became a lawyer and was admitted to the New South Wales Supreme Court in 1972. He had earlier joined the Labor Party, and served as a member of the State Executive 1969–1971. On 3 February 1973 he married Dorothy Jones, with whom he had a son and a daughter.

In 1979, Dyer was appointed to the New South Wales Legislative Council as a Labor member following the resignation of John Ducker. In 1988 he entered the shadow ministry as Shadow Minister for Police and Emergency Services. He was shifted to Housing in 1989 and to Family, Community and Disability Services in 1991. When the Labor Party won power in 1995, he was appointed Minister for Community Services and Minister for Aged Services, and was the deputy leader of the Government in the Legislative Council. In 1997 he became Minister for Public Works and Services. He was also the Chair of the NSW Parliamentary Standing Committee on Law and Justice; Chair of the NSW Attorney-General's Caucus Committee; and a Member of the Council of Macquarie University. Dyer retired in 2003.

He also served as a member of the Australian Labor Party's (NSW Branch) Administration Committee from 1978 to 1989, as Secretary of NSW State Parliament Group of Amnesty International from 1992 to 1995, and on the Council of the University of Newcastle from 1982 until 1988. He is the Convenor of the Evatt Foundation's Democracy and Human Rights Committee.

In 2011, Brad Hazzard NSW Minister for Planning appointed Dyer as a Joint Chair of a Review of the NSW Planning System together with former NSW Environment Minister Tim Moore. In December 2011, he and Mr Moore released an Issues Paper based on an extensive, statewide community and stakeholder consultation process. After consideration of the more than 600 submissions to the Issues Paper (and earlier submissions), Volume 1 (Major Issues) and Volume 2 (Other Issues) of their Review Paper with recommendations for a new planning system in NSW were prepared and provided to the Minister for Planning and Infrastructure.

On Saturday 14 July 2012, the Minister released Mr Moore and Mr Dyer's Review Report, The Way Ahead for Planning in NSW Volume 1 (Major Issues) and Volume 2 (Other Issues), together with the Government's initial response to the Review, A New Planning System for NSW – Green Paper. The release of these papers marks the end of their work on the Review.
