= Jim Kaldis =

Australian politician

James Kaldis (20 August 1932 – 3 March 2007) was a Greek-born Australian politician. He was a Labor member of the New South Wales Legislative Council from 1978 to 1999.

Kaldis was born in Greece, migrated to Australia in 1950, and became a citizen in 1954. He worked as a journalist and newspaper editor, and then as an actor and stage director. He was a founding member and licensee of the radio station 2EA (later SBS Radio), and directed the Greek programmes for the station. He was also a founding member of the Ethnic Communities Council and was involved in various migrant organisations. In 1978 he was elected to the New South Wales Legislative Council as a Labor member, where he served until his retirement in 1999. He died in Sydney in 2007.
