= Bob Rowland Smith =

Australian politician

Robert Baron "Bob" Rowland Smith (15 October 1925 – 5 July 2012) was an Australian politician. He was a National Party member of the New South Wales Legislative Council from 1974 until 1999.

Born in Sydney, Rowland Smith was educated at Knox Grammar School, graduating in 1942. He served in the Royal Australian Navy from 1943 to 1947 and in the Naval Volunteer Reserve 1947–60, with the rank of lieutenant. After one year at the University of Sydney he became a wool grower and processor, joining the Country Party in 1956. He was Chairman of the Australian Merino Wool Campaign Committee and the Wool Buyers' Association. He was also the founder of Canobolas Wool Topmaking Pty Ltd in Orange.

In 1974, Rowland Smith was appointed to the New South Wales Legislative Council after Eben Vickery's death. He became Leader of the National Party in the Legislative Council in 1978 and Deputy Leader of the Government in 1988, when the Greiner Coalition won government. He was Minister for Sport, Recreation and Racing until 1991. He remained in the council until his retirement in 1999; he was granted retention of the title "The Honourable" for life. He died in July 2012.

Political offices
Preceded by Michael Cleary as Minister for Sport and Recreation and Minister for Racing	Minister for Sport, Recreation and Racing; 1988 – 1989	Succeeded by Himself
Preceded by Himself	Minister for Sport and Recreation; 1989 – 1991	Succeeded by George Souris as Minister for Sport, Recreation and Racing
Preceded by Himself	Minister for Racing; 1989 – 1991	Succeeded by George Souris as Minister for Sport, Recreation and Racing
