= Johno Johnson =

Australian trade unionist and Labor politician (1930–2017)

John Richard Johnson GCSG

President of the New South Wales Legislative Council
- In office 7 November 1978 – 3 July 1991

Member of the New South Wales Legislative Council
- In office 23 April 1976 – 4 September 2001
- Succeeded by: Michael Costa

Personal details
- Born: John Richard Johnson; 26 July 1930 Murwillumbah, New South Wales, Australia
- Died: 9 August 2017 (aged 87) Randwick, Sydney, New South Wales, Australia
- Party: Australian Labor Party
- Spouse: Pauline Christina Russell (m. 1962)
- Children: 2 sons, 2 daughters (adopted)
- Education: Mt St Patrick's Catholic School, Murwillumbah
- Occupation: Grocer, trade unionist, politician

John Richard "Johno" Johnson GCSG (26 July 1930 – 9 August 2017) was an Australian trade unionist and politician who served as a member of the New South Wales Legislative Council from 1976 to 2001. He held the presidency of the Legislative Council from 1978 to 1991, making him one of the longest-serving Presidents in the chamber's history, and was the first elected President to be voted out of office. Federal Labor leader Bill Shorten described him as "the heart, soul and sinews of NSW Labor", and former Prime Minister Paul Keating called him "a true prince of the Labor movement."

== Early life ==
Johnson was born on 26 July 1930 in Murwillumbah, northern New South Wales, the son of Nellie, a housewife, and Harry Johnson, a quarantine officer on the Queensland–NSW border. An early bout of tetanus delayed his schooling by two years. He was educated at Mt St Patrick's Catholic School in Murwillumbah. His father died suddenly when Johnson was a teenager, forcing him to leave school after nine months of secondary education to support the family. He worked in the family grocery store, then as a railway clerk, post office employee, credit union manager and shop assistant before finding his vocation in the labour movement. He was a full-time union official from 1962.

== Union career ==
Johnson became a delegate to the Shop Assistants' Union and rose through its ranks to the position of Assistant Secretary. He joined the Australian Labor Party at fifteen, having already handed out how-to-vote cards for John Curtin at the 1943 Australian federal election aged thirteen.

== Political activity ==
Within the ALP, Johnson held numerous organisational roles over several decades. He served as President of the ALP Youth Council, a member of the party's Central Executive, President of the Finance Committee, the Administrative Committee and the Centenary Committee, Honorary Finance Officer of the NSW Branch, and President of the ALP Maroubra Branch. He also served as Returning Officer for both the Maroubra State Electoral Council and the Kingsford-Smith Federal Electoral Council, and as Treasurer of the ALP (New South Wales Branch). He became well known for raising funds through raffles, Melbourne Cup sweeps and the patient cultivation of donors. He was made a life member of the Australian Labor Party.

Johnson lived through the ALP split of the mid-1950s and later described it as having brought everything he held dear within a whisker of being extinguished. A proud anti-communist and committed Catholic Laborite, he believed that the Church's social justice teachings were entirely compatible with social democracy. The historian Manning Clark described Labor's years from 1949 to 1972 as "the years of unleavened bread"; Johnson was among those of his generation who kept the faith through that long period of opposition, seeking allies in figures such as Gough Whitlam and Neville Wran — neither of them of the NSW Right, but both critically empowered by the factional coalition Johnson helped to sustain.

== Parliamentary career ==
=== Election to the Council ===
Johnson was elected to the New South Wales Legislative Council for the Labor Party at the November 1975 election, taking his seat on 23 April 1976. At that time the Council was an indirectly elected chamber, reconstituted under a system of direct election following the 1978 reforms which took effect from 1984.

=== Inaugural speech in Parliament ===
Johnson's inaugural speech was delivered on 10 November 1976 during the Second Reading of the Appropriation Bill. It covered two issues that would define his public life: opposition to abortion and the public funding of election campaigns.

He opened by paying tribute to John Ducker, president of the ALP, and Barrie Unsworth, assistant secretary of the Labor Council of New South Wales, for their help and guidance over many years. He also paid special tribute to four nuns of the Lismore Presentation Order who had shaped his thinking during his formative years: Sisters Mary Kieran, Aiden and Koska, and the late Sister Mary de Sales Daly.

On abortion, Johnson drew on the language of Catholic social teaching to make an uncompromising argument against the practice, calling those who performed abortions "new Herods" and calling on the government to fund pro-life clinics.

On election funding, Johnson made a detailed case for the public funding of political campaigns that proved ahead of its time. He surveyed international practice at length, noting that nine jurisdictions had already adopted public funding — Finland (1966), Denmark (1969), Sweden (1965), West Germany (1959), Austria (1961), Norway (1970), Italy (1974), Puerto Rico (1957), and the Canadian province of Quebec (1963) — and cited the United States post-Watergate reforms as a model for transparency and donation disclosure. He described Sweden's model in detail, noting that each returned member's party received $16,000 and that $4.5 million had been distributed to parties based on vote share. He argued that mandatory disclosure of donations would end corrupting influences, and looked forward to "the day when the bagmen of the political parties are put out of business." New South Wales did not introduce public funding of election campaigns until 1981, five years after the speech.

=== Presidency of the Legislative Council ===
On Melbourne Cup Day, 7 November 1978, Johnson was elected President of the New South Wales Legislative Council, the youngest member ever to hold that office. He broke with tradition by discarding the wig and gown previously worn in the role, preferring to preside in a suit. During his presidency, the new Parliament House buildings were constructed and the original buildings restored.

In 1988, the Coalition attempted to replace Johnson as President with one of their own members. With the support of the cross benches, Johnson survived the challenge. However, in July 1991, the Coalition — this time with the support of the Call to Australia Group — succeeded in removing him. Johnson thereby became the first elected President of the Legislative Council to be voted out of office. His presidency had lasted from 7 November 1978 to 3 July 1991.

=== Continued membership and retirement ===
Following the 1984 reconstitution of the Council as a directly elected chamber, Johnson was re-elected on 24 March 1984 and again on 25 March 1995. He remained a member of the Legislative Council until his resignation on 4 September 2001 — a parliamentary career spanning 25 years — and was succeeded by Michael Costa.

In his farewell speech in 2001 he said: "Unless we nurture the young, unless we pass on the heritage, our political parties will die and our political institutions will die. I hold certain principles, and I hold them very strongly." His personal motto throughout his career was "keep the faith – both of them", meaning his religious faith and his faith in the Labor movement.

When he retired, Johnson declined to write a memoir. His explanation was characteristic: "I want to keep my mates!" Even after leaving parliament, he continued to attend Trades Hall and the Polding Centre to promote his various causes — and did so even when moving was painful and required two walking sticks.

== Party and political influence ==
Johnson operated at the centre of the NSW Right faction of the ALP during its most powerful decades. He was a close ally of Labor Council of NSW leaders John Ducker (NSW ALP president from 1970 to 1979) and Barrie Unsworth, and worked within the coalition that sustained figures such as Gough Whitlam and Neville Wran.

NSW Opposition Leader Luke Foley said Johnson had been "a mentor, counsellor and confidante to half a dozen generations of Labor Party activists" and that "more than anyone I know, Johno personified the tradition within the Labor Party of fidelity to Catholic social teaching."

Keating paid tribute in terms that acknowledged the distance between Johnson's generation and the present: "John was part of a generation of believers. We can only trust the essence, commitment and intensity of those beliefs can stand as an example to another generation committed to social ideals and public virtue."

At one of Johnson's retirement functions, Neville Wran surveyed a room of Labor stalwarts, bishops, religious leaders and family and began his speech: "I can't think of a single thing Johno and I agree on" — before proceeding to pay deep-felt tribute to his courage, his convictions, and his arresting presence. Gough Whitlam was also present that evening. Johnson and Whitlam exchanged yearly birthday greetings. On that occasion Johnson teased Whitlam about his prospects for burial in the crypt of St Mary's Cathedral, a story Johnson told in public for the first time that night and which was subsequently retold widely in Labor circles.

Johnson was also known for identifying and encouraging political talent across party lines. As a young student politician and media commentator in the early 1980s, Tony Abbott had his political potential spotted by Johnson, who along with others attempted to recruit him to the ALP. An article in The Catholic Weekly in 1981 or 1982 quoted Abbott saying he felt more drawn to Labor than to the other side. Abbott later rose to become the 28th Prime Minister of Australia. Following Johnson's death, Abbott rose in the Australian House of Representatives to pay tribute, describing him as "a fine Australian" and stating: "Johno has not only been a great stalwart of the Labor Party but an exemplar of the committed citizen. He made his choices: to faith, to party, and to country and stuck unshakeably to them every moment of a long and productive life."

In his later years, even as his physical condition declined, Johnson continued to mentor politicians from his nursing home, receiving regular visits from former premiers Barrie Unsworth and Bob Carr and former Prime Minister Paul Keating.

== Faith and community service ==
Johnson was a devout Catholic and one of the most prominent Catholic laymen in New South Wales public life. His community roles included:

- Member of the board of Cancer Council Australia
- Director of the Prince of Wales and Prince Henry Hospital Group
- Chairman of the Catholic Newspaper Company Pty Ltd, publishers of The Catholic Weekly, where he oversaw a return to profitability
- Member of the Board of NSW Lotteries
- Chair of the Advisory Committee, Foodbank New South Wales
- Director of Randwick Labor Club
- Guildmaster, Catholic Evidence Guild
- Fellow of Warrane College, University of New South Wales

Cardinal George Pell articulated what he called the "Johno Effect": "His contribution encouraged an entire generation of Catholics and other Christians to be imbued with a solid understanding of Catholic social doctrine, within the Labor party in particular, and more generally within public life."

In 1997, on the passing of Mother Teresa, Johnson moved a condolence motion in the NSW Parliament, citing her personal card: "The fruit of silence is prayer; The fruit of prayer is faith; The fruit of faith is love; The fruit of love is service; The fruit of service is peace."

== Honours and awards ==
In 2001, Johnson was awarded the Centenary Medal.

In 2006, Pope Benedict XVI created Johnson a Knight Commander of the Order of St Gregory the Great (KCSG) for services to the Church in Australia, in recognition of his defence of Catholic social teaching in political life and his work with organisations including the Right to Life movement and the St Vincent de Paul Society. In 2016, Pope Francis elevated him to Knight Grand Cross (GCSG) of the same order, the highest rank available.

== Personal life ==
Johnson married Pauline Christina Russell on 6 January 1962. They adopted two sons and two daughters — Andrew, Michael, Monica and Naomi — whom he described in his maiden speech as his "four chosen children." His recreational interests included reading, fishing, gardening, cricket, and Irish affairs. The couple remained together until his death — 55 years of marriage.

== Death and state funeral ==
Johnson died peacefully in Randwick, Sydney, in the early hours of 9 August 2017, aged 87, in the company of his family. Former NSW Premier Barrie Unsworth went to Parliament House to request a state funeral, reportedly telling the Premier's Chief of Staff: "I'm entitled to one — can he have mine?" Premier Gladys Berejiklian agreed to the request. A state funeral was held at St Mary's Cathedral, Sydney on 18 August 2017.

In his eulogy at the Requiem Mass, Archbishop Anthony Fisher described Johnson as "a true believer: not in the sense of a zealot, but in the sense of a decent man with deep commitments, a man who practised what he preached with energy and compassion." Fisher noted that in retirement Johnson had continued to haunt Trades Hall and the Polding Centre, "promoting his many causes, even when moving was painful and required two sticks." Fisher also said: "Others will speak of his life in the labour movement and the party, as an MP and as President of the Legislative Council — but in all these matters Johno was a true believer."

The Vicar General of the Archdiocese of Sydney, Fr Gerald Gleeson, asked priests across the archdiocese to remember Johnson in their Masses, writing: "Johno was the Chairman of the Board of The Catholic Weekly for ten years and was outstanding in his commitment to the Church; always taking a strong stand in his political life to support the Right to Life movement, being outspoken against euthanasia, and providing his leisure time to assist causes within his Parish including the work of the St Vincent de Paul Society."

New South Wales Legislative Council
Preceded by	President of the New South Wales Legislative Council; 1978–1991	Succeeded by
