= Delcia Kite =

Australian politician

- Born: Delcia Ivy Smith; 25 August 1923; Sydney, Australia
- Died: August 21, 2012 (aged 88); Sydney, Australia
- Education: Sydney Technical College; Sydney Girls High School
- Spouse(s): Frederick Thomas-Kite (1946.10.26－)
- Children: 4
- Parent(s): Alexander Smith; Ivy Clarke

Delcia Ivy Kite, née Smith (25 August 1923 – 21 August 2012) was an Australian politician. She was a Labor member of the New South Wales Legislative Council from 1976 to 1995.

Kite, the daughter of shearer and publican Alexander Henry Smith and Ivy Margaret Clarke, was born in Sydney, and attended Garden's Road Primary School and Sydney Girls High School. She then attended Sydney Technical College, where she focused on engineering and drawing. In 1941 she was employed by the Commonwealth Department of the Interior as a draughtswoman. She married Frederick Thomas Kite on 26 October 1946; their marriage would produce four children. Kite joined the Labor Party in 1948, and held various positions including secretary of the Granville and Rose Bay branches, secretary of the state electorate councils for Granville and Vaucluse, and secretary of the federal electorate councils for Reid and Wentworth.

In 1976, Kite was appointed to the New South Wales Legislative Council. She served on that body until her retirement in 1995.
