= Jack Hallam (politician) =

Australian politician (born 1942)

The Honourable Jack Hallam

Minister for Agriculture
- In office 29 February 1980 – 25 March 1988
- Premier: Neville Wran; Barrie Unsworth
- Preceded by: Don Day
- Succeeded by: Ian Armstrong

Minister for Lands
- In office 4 July 1986 – 25 March 1988
- Premier: Barrie Unsworth
- Preceded by: John Aquilina (as Minister for Natural Resources)
- Succeeded by: Garry West

Minister for Forests
- In office 5 November 1986 – 25 March 1988
- Premier: Barrie Unsworth
- Preceded by: John Aquilina (as Minister for Natural Resources)
- Succeeded by: Garry West

Vice President of Executive Council Leader of the Government in the Legislative Council
- In office 5 November 1986 – 25 March 1988
- Preceded by: Barrie Unsworth
- Succeeded by: Ted Pickering

Minister for Fisheries
- In office 2 October 1981 – 4 July 1986
- Premier: Neville Wran
- Preceded by: New portfolio
- Succeeded by: Janice Crosio (as Minister for Water Resources)

Minister for Decentralisation
- In office 19 October 1978 – 29 February 1980
- Premier: Neville Wran
- Preceded by: New portfolio
- Succeeded by: Don Day

Member of the New South Wales Legislative Council
- In office 23 April 1973 – 12 September 1991
- Succeeded by: Eddie Obeid

Personal details
- Born: Jack Rowland Hallam; 10 September 1942 (age 83) Griffith, New South Wales, Australia
- Party: Labor
- Children: 2 daughters
- Occupation: Farmer

Jack Rowland Hallam (born 10 September 1942), a former Australian politician, was a member of the New South Wales Legislative Council from 1973 to 1991 representing Labor. Hallam held several ministerial posts in the state governments led by Neville Wran and Barrie Unsworth, notably Minister for Agriculture.

== Early years ==
Born in Griffith, New South Wales, Hallam worked as an apprentice plumber in 1956, a roustabout and wool classer from 1956 to 1959, a contract harvester and share farmer from 1959 to 1964, and a sheep farmer from 1967 to 1976. At various times he held membership of the Australian Workers' Union and the Federated Clerks' Union.

== Political career ==
In 1973 Hallam was appointed to the New South Wales Legislative Council to represent the New South Wales Labor Party. Five years later, Neville Wran having by this stage become Premier, Hallam was appointed Minister for Decentralisation, moving to Agriculture in 1980. He remained Agriculture Minister until 1988; he was also minister for Fisheries (1981–86), Lands (1986–88), Forests (1986–88) and vice-president of the Executive Council (1986–88). He was also Deputy Leader of the Government in the Legislative Council (1978–86), and Leader (1986–88).

In 1984, as the NSW Minister for Agriculture and Forestry, Hallam instigated a commemorative award, called the McKell Medal, in honour of the contribution that Sir William McKell had made to the development of a soil and water conservation ethic within Australia.

Hallam continued to lead the Opposition in the Legislative Council until he retired from politics in 1991.

== Published writings ==
- Hallam, Jack (1983). The untold story: Labor in rural NSW. Allen & Unwin. p. 144. ISBN 0-86861-167-0.

Political offices
Preceded by Don Day	Minister for Decentralisation; Minister Assisting the Premier; 1978–1980	Succeeded by Don Day
Preceded by Don Day	Minister for Agriculture; 1980–1988	Succeeded by Ian Armstrong
New title	Minister for Fisheries; 1981–1986	Succeeded by Janice Crosio as Minister for Natural Resources
Preceded by John Aquilina as Minister for Water Resources	Minister for Lands; Minister for Forests; 1986–1988	Vacant Title next held by Garry West
Preceded by Barrie Unsworth	Leader of the NSW Government in the Legislative Council; 1986–1988	Succeeded by Ted Pickering
