= Adrian Solomons =

Politician and solicitor in New South Wales, Australia

Sir Louis Adrian Solomons (9 June 1922 – 20 December 1991) was an Australian politician. He was a Country Party (later National Party) member of the New South Wales Legislative Council from 1969 to 1991.

Solomons was born in Tamworth and educated at local high schools. He attended the University of New England and the University of Sydney, where he graduated with a Bachelor of Arts in 1945 and a Doctor of Laws in 1949. He served in the 2nd Australian Infantry Force 1940–46, including overseas service with the 9th Australian Division. On 29 November 1944 he married Olwyn Bishop, with whom he had two sons. In 1949, the year he was admitted as a solicitor, he joined the Country Party. He was a member of the New South Wales Advisory Committee in the Australian Broadcasting Commission and chairman of Tamworth Celebrity Concerts from 1960 to 1967; he was also a delegate to the Constitutional Convention of 1976.

On 12 March 1969 Solomons was elected unopposed to the New South Wales Legislative Council for the Country Party to replace Alexander Armstrong (Country), who had been expelled from the council. He was re-elected to a 12 year term at a joint sitting of parliament on 27 November 1975. The Legislative Council was reformed as a directly elected body and he was elected at the election in 1984 to a 12 year term ending in 1996. He was National President of the National Country Party from 1974 to 1980, and was knighted in 1982 for public and community service. From 1988 to 1991 he was Chairman of Committees in the Council. Solomons retired from parliament in 1991.

Solomons died at Double Bay on 20 December 1991 (aged 69).

New South Wales Legislative Council
Preceded by Clive Healey	Chairman of Committees; 1988–1991	Succeeded by Duncan Gay
Party political offices
Preceded by Sidney Roberts	Federal President of the Country Party; 1974–1978	Succeeded by Tom Drake-Brockman
