= Ted Pickering =

Australian politician (1939–2025)

The Honourable Ted Pickering AM
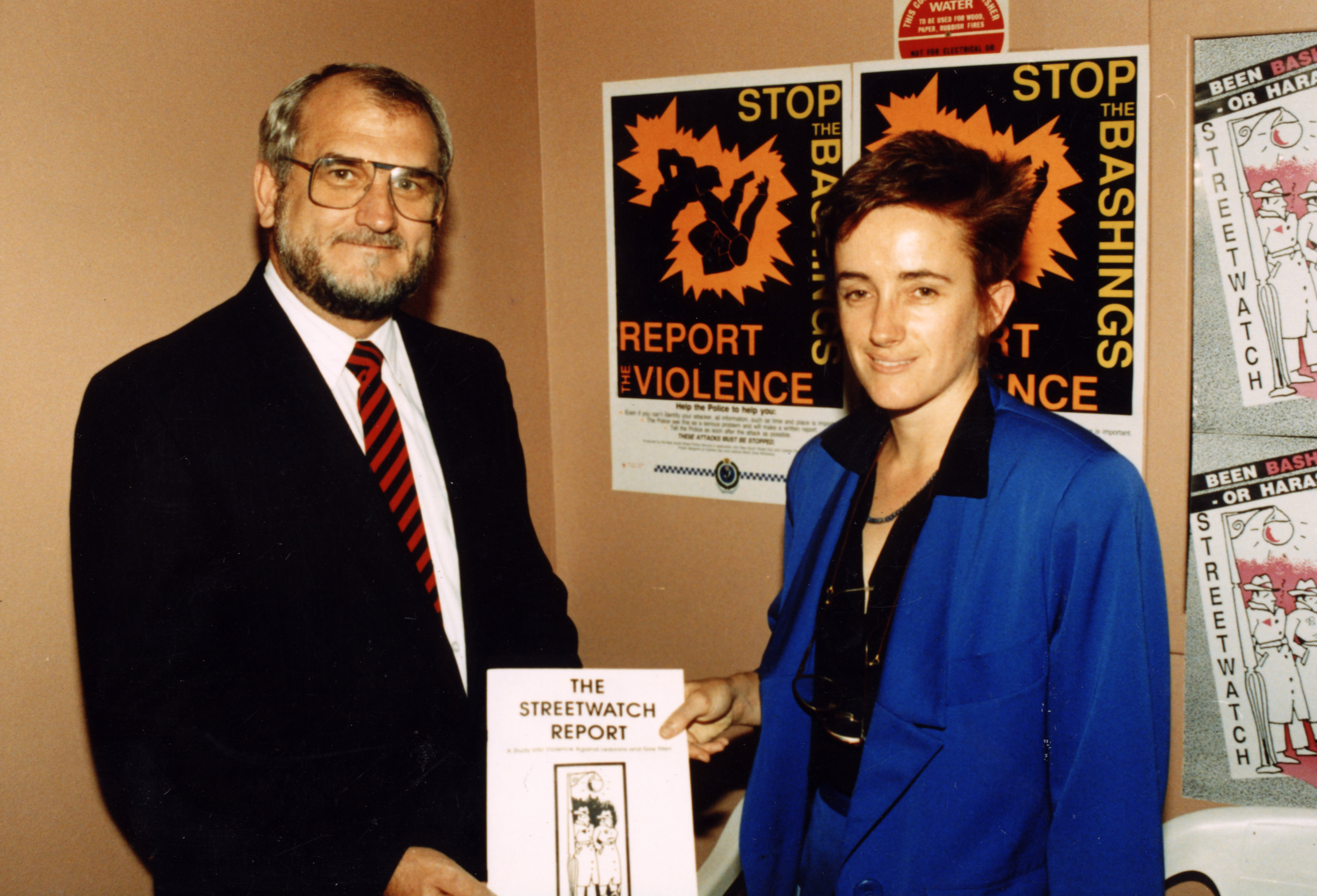
- Pickering and Sue Thompson at the launch of the Gay & Lesbian Rights Lobby's "Streetwatch Report" on 9 April 1990

Member of the New South Wales Legislative Council
- In office 13 October 1976 – 11 October 1995
- Succeeded by: Charlie Lynn

Personal details
- Born: Edward Phillip Pickering; 1 November 1939 Newcastle, New South Wales, Australia
- Died: 2 December 2025 Sydney, New South Wales, Australia
- Party: Liberal Party
- Education: University of New South Wales
- Profession: Chemical engineer

Edward Phillip Pickering AM (1 November 1939 – 2 December 2025) was an Australian politician. He was a Liberal Member of the New South Wales Legislative Council from 1976 to 1995.

== Life and career ==
Pickering was born in Newcastle, New South Wales. He studied for a Bachelor of Science majoring in chemical engineering at the University of New South Wales. He worked as a production executive and professional consultant for 28 years, travelling widely to many countries including the United States, Canada, the United Kingdom, Poland, Russia, France and Germany. He had served in the University Regiment from 1958 to 1968.

In 1976, Pickering was elected to the New South Wales Legislative Council as a member of the Liberal Party. In 1984, he was elected Leader of the Opposition in the Legislative Council. When the Coalition under Nick Greiner won government in 1988, Pickering was appointed Leader of the Government in the Legislative Council, Vice-President of the Executive Council and Minister for Police and Emergency Services.

His portfolio experienced some changes during 1992 when John Fahey became premier. It was during Fahey's early months as premier that Pickering was shifted from the police to justice ministry after a breakdown in relations between Pickering and police commissioner Tony Lauer. Pickering lasted in the justice portfolio for a month when he resigned.

In 1994, he returned to cabinet in a reshuffle and was appointed Minister for Energy and Local Government. Ironically, the reshuffle was caused by the resignation of Terry Griffiths his replacement as police minister.

Following the Coalition's election defeat in 1995, Pickering resigned from Parliament. His seat was filled by Charlie Lynn as part of a deal that saw John Fahey becoming the Liberal candidate for Macarthur at the 1996 election. Fahey was successful.

Pickering died on 2 December 2025 at the age of 86.

Political offices
Preceded by Garry West	Minister for Local Government and Co-operatives; 1994–1995	Succeeded by Ernie Page
