= Candidates of the 2023 New South Wales state election =

This is a list of the candidates of the 2023 New South Wales state election, which was held on 25 March 2023.

== Retiring MPs ==
The following members announced they would not be contesting the 2023 election:

=== Labor ===
- Walt Secord MLC – announced 19 August 2022
- Adam Searle MLC – lost preselection 15 September 2022
- Shaoquett Moselmane MLC – did not nominate for endorsement
- Guy Zangari MP (Fairfield) – announced 17 October 2022
- Paul Lynch MP (Liverpool) – not preselected November 2022
- Nick Lalich MP (Cabramatta) – announced 24 December 2022

=== Liberal ===
- Shelley Hancock MP (South Coast) – announced 18 December 2021
- Gabrielle Upton MP (Vaucluse) – announced 6 July 2022
- Kevin Conolly MP (Riverstone) – announced 15 August 2022
- Victor Dominello MP (Ryde) – announced 17 August 2022
- Geoff Lee MP (Parramatta) – announced 22 August 2022
- Jonathan O'Dea MP (Davidson) – announced 6 September 2022
- Rob Stokes MP (Pittwater) – announced 30 September 2022
- David Elliott MP (Baulkham Hills) – announced 22 October 2022
- Brad Hazzard MP (Wakehurst) – announced 24 October 2022
- Matthew Mason-Cox MLC – not preselected 22 December 2022
- Lou Amato MLC – not preselected 22 December 2022
- Shayne Mallard MLC – not preselected 22 December 2022
- Peter Poulos MLC – disendorsed 18 February 2023
- Scott Farlow MLC – not preselected (Note: Farlow assumed the casual vacancy created by Natasha Maclaren-Jones following the election.)

=== Nationals ===
- Stephen Bromhead (Note: Bromhead died on 16 March 2023.) MP (Myall Lakes) – announced 17 August 2022
- Chris Gulaptis MP (Clarence) – announced 22 August 2022
- Melinda Pavey MP (Oxley) – announced 28 August 2022

=== Independent ===
- Justin Field MLC – announced 17 October 2022
- John Sidoti MP (Drummoyne) – announced 24 November 2022

=== Other ===
- Jamie Parker MP (Balmain, Greens) – announced 14 October 2022
- Mark Pearson MLC (Animal Justice Party)

== Legislative Assembly ==
Sitting members are shown in bold text. Successful candidates are highlighted in the relevant colour. Where there is possible confusion, an asterisk (*) is also used. The candidates have been derived from the NSW Electoral Commission website.

| Electorate | Held by | Labor candidate | Coalition candidates | Greens candidate | SAP candidate | Other candidates |
|---|---|---|---|---|---|---|
| Albury | Liberal | Marcus Rowland | **Justin Clancy** (Lib) | Eli Davern | Ross Hamilton | Asanki Fernando (AJP); Geoffrey Robertson (LDP); Peter Sinclair (SFF) |
| Auburn | Labor | **Lynda Voltz** | Mohammed Zaman (Lib) | Masoomeh Asgari | Shelley Goed | Jamal Daoud (-) (Note: Endorsed by unregistered Australians United.); Julie Morkos Douaihy (LDP) |
| Badgerys Creek | Liberal | Garion Thain | **Tanya Davies** (Lib) | Nick Best | Peter Cooper | Benjamin Green (PHON) |
| Ballina | Greens | Andrew Broadley | Josh Booyens (Nat) | **Tamara Smith** | Peter Jenkins | Kevin Loughrey (Ind) |
| Balmain | Greens | Philippa Scott | Freya Leach (Lib) | Kobi Shetty | Stephen Bisgrove | Glen Stelzer (PEP) |
| Bankstown | Labor | **Jihad Dib** | Nathan Taleb (Lib) | Isaac Nasedra | Luke Habib | Dorlene Abou-Haidar (AJP); Yosra Alyateem (IMOP); Max Boddy (-) (Note: Endorsed by unregistered Socialist Equality Party.); Marianne Glinka (PEP) |
| Barwon | Independent | Joshua Roberts-Garnsey | Annette Turner (Nat) | Pat Schultz | | Paul Britton (SFF); **Roy Butler*** (Ind); Ben Hartley (LCP); Stuart Howe (Ind); Thomas McBride (PEP) |
| Bathurst | National | Cameron Shaw | **Paul Toole** (Nat) | Kay Nankervis | Michael Begg | Craig Sinclair (SFF); Martin Ticehurst (Ind); Burchell Wilson (LDP); Anthony Zbik (LCP) |
| Bega | Labor | **Michael Holland** | Russell Fitzpatrick (Lib) | Cathy Griff | Karin Geiselhart | Debra Abbott (SFF); Jeffrey Hawkins (Ind); Greg White (LCP) |
| Blacktown | Labor | **Stephen Bali** | Allan Green (Lib) | Leonard Hobbs | Patrick Murphy | Peter Foster (LCP); Emma Kerin (AJP); Alexander Mishalow (LDP) |
| Blue Mountains | Labor | **Trish Doyle** | Sophie-Anne Bruce (Lib) | Jenna Condie | Richard Marschall | Greg Keightley (AJP); Michelle Palmer (IMOP) |
| Cabramatta | Labor | Tri Vo | Courtney Nguyen (Lib) | Roz Chia Davis | | Kate Hoang (Ind); Randa Moussa (AJP); Mark Smaling (LDP) |
| Camden | Liberal | Sally Quinnell | **Peter Sidgreaves** (Lib) | Emily Rivera | Jessie Bijok | Garry Dollin (PHON) |
| Campbelltown | Labor | **Greg Warren** | Gypshouna Paudel (Lib) | Jayden Rivera | Howard Jones | Tofick Galiell (Ind); Rosa Sicari (LDP); Matt Twaddell (AJP); Adam Zahra (PHON) |
| Canterbury | Labor | **Sophie Cotsis** | Nemr Boumansour (Lib) | Bradley Schott | Joe Sinacori | Vanessa Hadchiti (LDP); Kacey King (AJP) |
| Castle Hill | Liberal | Tina Cartwright | Mark Hodges (Lib) | Tina Kordrostami | Eric Claus | Nathan Organ (Ind); My Trinh (LDP) |
| Cessnock | Labor | **Clayton Barr** | Asher Barnham (disendorsed) (Nat) | Llynda Nairn | Graham Jones | Victoria Davies (AJP); Andrew Fenwick (LCP); Quintin King (PHON) |
| Charlestown | Labor | **Jodie Harrison** | Jack Antcliff (Lib) | Greg Watkinson | Marie Rolfe | |
| Clarence | National | Leon Ankersmit | Richie Williamson (Nat) | Greg Clancy | George Keller | Brett Duroux (-) (Note: Endorsed by unregistered Indigenous-Aboriginal Party of Australia.); Nicki Levi (Ind); Debrah Novak (Ind); Mark Rayner (LCP) |
| Coffs Harbour | National | Anthony Judge | **Gurmesh Singh** (Nat) | Tim Nott | Ruth Cully | Tihema Elliston (LCP); Kellie Pearce (AJP); Sally Townley (Ind) |
| Coogee | Labor | **Marjorie O'Neill** | Kylie von Muenster (Lib) | Rafaela Pandolfini | Lluisa Murray | Alicia Mosquera (IMOP); Simon Garrod (AJP) |
| Cootamundra | National | Chris Dahlitz | **Steph Cooke** (Nat) | Jeff Passlow | Chris O'Rourke | Jake Cullen (SFF); Brian Fisher (Ind); Robert Young (Ind) |
| Cronulla | Liberal | Paul Constance | **Mark Speakman** (Lib) | Catherine Dyson | Richard Moran | Domna Giannakis (IMOP); Craig Ibbotson (PHON) |
| Davidson | Liberal | Karyn Edelstein | Matt Cross (Lib) | Caroline Atkinson | Andrew Wills | Janine Kitson (Ind) |
| Drummoyne | Independent | Julia Little | Stephanie Di Pasqua (Lib) | Charles Jago | Patrick Conaghan | |
| Dubbo | National | Joshua Black | **Dugald Saunders** (Nat) | Robyn Thomas | Anthony Nugent | Mark Littlejohn (LCP); Kate Richardson (SFF) |
| East Hills | Liberal | Kylie Wilkinson | **Wendy Lindsay** (Lib) | Natalie Hanna | | Christopher Brogan (Ind) |
| Epping | Liberal | Alan Mascarenhas | **Dominic Perrottet** (Lib) | Phil Bradley | Bradley Molloy | Carmen Terceiro (AJP); Victor Waterson (Ind) |
| Fairfield | Labor | David Saliba | Aaryen Pillai (Lib) | Monika Ball | | Robyn Leggatt (PEP); Severino Lovero (Ind); Hikmat Odesh (Ind); Jacob Potkonyak (LCP) |
| Gosford | Labor | **Liesl Tesch** | Deanna Bocking (Lib) | Hilary van Haren | Ineka Soetens | Lisa Bellamy (Ind); Larry Freeman (SFF); Emily McCallum (AJP) |
| Goulburn | Liberal | Michael Pilbrow | **Wendy Tuckerman** (Lib) | Gregory John Olsen | Margaret Logan | Andrew Wood (SFF) |
| Granville | Labor | **Julia Finn** | Anm Masum (Lib) | Janet Castle | | John Hadchiti (LDP); Rohan Laxmanalal (AJP); Charbel Saad (Ind) |
| Hawkesbury | Liberal | Amanda Kotlash | **Robyn Preston** (Lib) | Danielle Wheeler | Elissa Carey | Eddie Dogramaci (SBP); Angela Maguire (Ind); Tony Pettitt (Ind); Susane Popovski (PHON) |
| Heathcote | Liberal | Maryanne Stuart | **Lee Evans** (Lib) | Cooper Riach | Matthew Bragg | Sean Ambrose (SFF) (disendorsed); Arielle Perkett (AJP) |
| Heffron | Labor | **Ron Hoenig** | Francis Devine (Lib) | Philipa Veitch | Ann Godfrey | Rachel Evans (SAll); Sarina Kilham (Ind); Linda Paull (AJP) |
| Holsworthy | Liberal | Mick Maroney | Tina Ayyad (Lib) | Chris Kerle | | James Ingarfill (PHON); Deborah Swinbourn (Ind) |
| Hornsby | Liberal | Melissa Holie | **Matt Kean** (Lib) | Tania Salitra | Justin Thomas | Steve Busch (PHON); Benjamin Caswell (Ind); Adrian Dignam (Ind); Jeffrey Grimshaw (LDP) |
| Keira | Labor | **Ryan Park** | Noah Shipp (Lib) | Kit Docker | Andrew Anthony | |
| Kellyville | Liberal | Alex Karki | **Ray Williams** (Lib) | Thelma Ghayyem | Heather Boyd | Ingrid Akkari (AJP) |
| Kiama | Independent | Katelin McInerney | **Melanie Gibbons** (Lib) | Tonia Gray | John Gill | **Gareth Ward** (Ind) |
| Kogarah | Labor | **Chris Minns** | Craig Chung (Lib) | Tracy Yuen | | Troy Stolz (Ind) |
| Lake Macquarie | Independent | Stephen Ryan | Joshua Beer (Lib) | Kim Grierson | Felipe Gore-Escalante | Jason Lesage (SFF); **Greg Piper*** (Ind) |
| Lane Cove | Liberal | Penelope Pedersen | **Anthony Roberts** (Lib) | Heather Armstrong | Ben Wise | Victoria Davidson (Ind) |
| Leppington | Labor | Nathan Hagarty | Therese Fedeli (Lib) | Apurva Shukla | Danica Sajn | Mandar Tamhankar (PHON) |
| Lismore | Labor | **Janelle Saffin** | Alex Rubin (Nat) | Adam Guise | Ross Honniball | Matthew Bertalli (SFF); Allen Crossthwaite (Ind); James McKenzie (Ind); Vanessa Rosayro (AJP) |
| Liverpool | Labor | Charishma Kaliyanda | Richard Ammoun (Lib) | Amy Croft | | Milomir Andjelkovic (Ind); Gabriel Hancock (AJP); Linda Harris (Ind) |
| Londonderry | Labor | **Prue Car** | Snigdha Talakola (Lib) | David Maurice | David Bowen | Luke Tester (PHON) |
| Macquarie Fields | Labor | **Anoulack Chanthivong** | Khairul Chowdhury (Lib) | Seamus Lee | Michael Clark | Gemma Noiosi (LDP); Donna Wilson (AJP) |
| Maitland | Labor | **Jenny Aitchison** | Michael Cooper (Lib) | Campbell Knox | Sam Ferguson | Daniel Dryden (LCP); Alex Lee (Ind); Neil Turner (PHON) |
| Manly | Liberal | Jasper Thatcher | **James Griffin** (Lib) | Terry le Roux | Emanuele Paletto | Phillip Altman (Ind); Joeline Hackman (Ind); Bailey Mason (AJP) |
| Maroubra | Labor | **Michael Daley** | Bill Burst (Lib) | Kym Chapple | Monique Isenheim | Roderick Aguilar (IMOP); Holly Williamson (AJP) |
| Miranda | Liberal | Simon Earle | **Eleni Petinos** (Lib) | Martin Moore | Nick Hughes | Gaye Cameron (Ind) |
| Monaro | National | Steve Whan | **Nichole Overall** (Nat) | Jenny Goldie | James Holgate | Chris Pryor (SFF); Josie Tanson (LCP); Andrew Thaler (Ind) |
| Mount Druitt | Labor | **Edmond Atalla** | Kandathil Sunil Jayadevan (Lib) | Asm Morshed | | Andrew Dudas (AJP) |
| Murray | Independent | Mirsad Buljubasic | Peta Betts (Nat) | Amelia King | Michael Florance | Greg Adamson (Ind); Adrian Carle (LCP); **Helen Dalton*** (Ind); Kevin Farrell (PEP); Desiree Gregory (SFF); David Landini (Ind) |
| Myall Lakes | National | Mark Vanstone | Tanya Thompson (Nat) | Eleanor Spence | Maree McDonald-Pritchard | Jason Bendall (Ind); Keys Manley (LCP) |
| Newcastle | Labor | **Tim Crakanthorp** | Thomas Triebsees (Lib) | John Mackenzie | Freya Taylor | Tim Claydon (LCP); Niko Leka (SAll) |
| Newtown | Greens | David Hetherington | Fiona Douskou (Lib) | **Jenny Leong** | Christopher Thomas | |
| North Shore | Liberal | Godfrey Santer | **Felicity Wilson** (Lib) | James Mullan | Lachlan Commins | Michael Antares (IMOP); Helen Conway (Ind); Victoria Walker (Ind) |
| Northern Tablelands | National | Yvonne Langenberg | **Adam Marshall** (Nat) | Elizabeth O'Hara | Alan Crowe | Margaret Hammond (LDP); Gary Hampton (PEP); Michael Hay (SFF); Natasha Ledger (Ind); Peter O'Loghlin (LCP); Darshan Wood (Ind) |
| Oatley | Liberal | Ash Ambihaipahar | **Mark Coure** (Lib) | Taylor Vandijk | Glenn Hunt | Natalie Mort (Ind) |
| Orange | Independent | Heather Dunn | Tony Mileto | David Mallard | George Bate | Gillian Bramley (PEP); **Philip Donato*** (Ind); Patricia Holt (LCP); Aaron Kelly (SFF) |
| Oxley | National | Gregory Vigors | Michael Kemp (Nat) | Dominic King | Bianca Drain | Joshua Fairhall (Ind); Troy Irwin (Ind); Megan Mathew (LCP) |
| Parramatta | Liberal | Donna Davis | Katie Mullens (Lib) | Ben Hammond | David Moll | Mritunjay Singh (PHON) |
| Penrith | Liberal | Karen McKeown | **Stuart Ayres** (Lib) | Fatemeh Toussi | Geoff Brown | Vanessa Blazi (AJP); Belinda McWilliams (PHON); Timothy Pateman (LCP) |
| Pittwater | Liberal | Jeffrey Quinn | Rory Amon (Lib) | Hilary Green | Craig Law | Jacqui Scruby (Ind) |
| Port Macquarie | Liberal | Keith McMullen | Peta Pinson (Nat); **Leslie Williams*** (Lib) | Stuart Watson | Edward Coleman | Vivian McMahon (LCP); Silvia Mogorovich (IMOP); Benjamin Read (LDP) |
| Port Stephens | Labor | **Kate Washington** | Nathan Errington (Lib) | Jordan Jensen | Beverley Jelfs | Michelle Buckmaster (AJP); Angela Ketas (IMOP); Mark Watson (PHON) |
| Prospect | Labor | **Hugh McDermott** | Kalvin Biag (Lib) | Sujan Selventhiran | Peter Shafer | Emily Walsh (AJP) |
| Riverstone | Liberal | Warren Kirby | Mohit Kumar (Lib) | Rob Vail | Tim Horan | Anthony Belcastro (SFF); Tabitha Ponnambalam (Ind) |
| Rockdale | Labor | **Steve Kamper** | Muhammad Rana (Lib) | Peter Strong | James Morris | |
| Ryde | Liberal | Lyndal Howison | Jordan Lane (Lib) | Sophie Edington | Bradley Jelfs | Barry Devine (IMOP) |
| Shellharbour | Labor | **Anna Watson** | Mikayla Barnes (Lib) | Jamie Dixon | Kenneth Davis | Rita Granata (LDP); Chris Homer (Ind); Mia Willmott (LCP) |
| South Coast | Liberal | Liza Butler | Luke Sikora (Lib) | Amanda Findley | Deanna Buffier | Nina Digiglio (Ind); Robert Korten (SFF) |
| Strathfield | Labor | **Jason Li** | John-Paul Baladi (Lib) | Courtney Buckley | Wally Crocker | Maurie Saidi (AJP) |
| Summer Hill | Labor | **Jo Haylen** | Bowen Cheng (Lib) | Izabella Antoniou | Michael Swan | Sandra Haddad (AJP) |
| Swansea | Labor | **Yasmin Catley** | Megan Anderson (Lib) | Heather Foord | Alan Ellis | Paul Jackson (LDP) |
| Sydney | Independent | Skye Tito | Phyllisse Stanton (Lib) | Nick Ward | Mark Whitton | **Alex Greenwich** (Ind) |
| Tamworth | National | Kate McGrath | **Kevin Anderson** (Nat) | Ryan Brooke | Colin Drain | Rebecca McCredie (IMOP); Sue Raye (LCP); Mark Rodda (Ind); Matthew Scanlan (SFF) |
| Terrigal | Liberal | Sam Boughton | **Adam Crouch** (Lib) | Imogen da Silva | Wayne Rigg | |
| The Entrance | Labor | **David Mehan** | Nathan Bracken (Lib) | Ralph Stephenson | Georgia Lamb | Bentley Logan (LDP); Fardin Pelarek (AJP) |
| Tweed | National | Craig Elliot | **Geoff Provest** (Nat) | Ciara Denham | Ronald McDonald | Susie Hearder (AJP); Marc Selan (LCP) |
| Upper Hunter | National | Peree Watson | **Dave Layzell** (Nat) | Tony Lonergan | Callum Blair | Tom Lillicrap (LCP); Dale McNamara (Ind); James White (SFF) |
| Vaucluse | Liberal | Margaret Merten | Kellie Sloane (Lib) | Dominic Wy Kanak | Kay Dunne | Edward Cameron (AJP); Karen Freyer (Ind); Gail Stevens (LDP) |
| Wagga Wagga | Independent | Keryn Foley | Andriana Benjamin (Nat); Julia Ham (Lib) | Ray Goodlass | | Raymond Gentles (PEP); **Joe McGirr*** (Ind); Christopher Smith (SFF) |
| Wahroonga | Liberal | Parsia Abedini | **Alister Henskens** (Lib) | Tim Dashwood | Stephen Molloy | Kristyn Haywood (Ind) |
| Wakehurst | Liberal | Sue Wright | Toby Williams (Lib) | Ethan Hrnjak | Greg Mawson | Michael Regan* (Ind); Susan Sorensen (AJP) |
| Wallsend | Labor | **Sonia Hornery** | Callum Pull (Lib) | Rebecca Watkins | Paul Akers | Pietro di Girolamo (PHON); Anna Nolan (AJP); Joshua Starrett (Ind) |
| Willoughby | Liberal | Sarah Griffin | **Tim James** (Lib) | Edmund McGrath | Michael Want | Larissa Penn (Ind) |
| Winston Hills | Liberal | Sameer Pandey | **Mark Taylor** (Lib) | Damien Atkins | Anthony Chadszinow | |
| Wollondilly | Liberal | Angus Braiden | **Nathaniel Smith** (Lib) | Jason Webster | Ildiko Haag | Judy Hannan* (Ind); Rebecca Thompson (PHON) |
| Wollongong | Labor | **Paul Scully** | Joel Johnson (Lib) | Cath Blakey | | Kristen Nelson (AJP) |
| Wyong | Labor | **David Harris** | Matt Squires (Lib) (disendorsed) | Doug Williamson | Susan Newbury | Martin Stevenson (PHON) |

== Legislative Council ==
Sitting members are shown in bold text.

Half of the Legislative Council is not up for re-election. This includes seven Labor members (Tara Moriarty, Penny Sharpe, Greg Donnelly, Anthony D'Adam, Daniel Mookhey, Peter Primrose, and Mark Buttigieg), five Liberal members (Damien Tudehope, Taylor Martin, Natalie Ward, Natasha Maclaren-Jones (Note: Resigning to recontest the Legislative Council) and Aileen MacDonald), three Nationals members (Sarah Mitchell, Wes Fang and Sam Farraway), two Greens members (Abigail Boyd and Sue Higginson), two One Nation members (Mark Latham and Rod Roberts), one Shooters and Fishers member (Mark Banasiak) and one Animal Justice member (Emma Hurst).

The Labor Party is defending seven seats. The Liberal Party is defending six seats. The National Party is defending three seats. The Greens, the Shooters, Fishers and Farmers Party and the Animal Justice Party are each defending one seat. Independent Fred Nile, elected as a Christian Democratic member, is defending his seat; and independent Justin Field, elected as a Greens member, is not defending his seat.

| Labor candidates | Coalition candidates | Greens candidates | One Nation candidates | SFF candidates |
|---|---|---|---|---|
| 1. **Courtney Houssos***; 2. **Rose Jackson***; 3. Cameron Murphy*; 4. Emily Suvaal*; 5. **John Graham***; 6. Bob Nanva*; 7. Stephen Lawrence*; 8. Sarah Kaine*; 9. **Mick Veitch**; 10. Stewart Prins; 11. Michelle Miran; 12. Marion Browne; 13. Rizwan Chowdhury; 14. Shoaib Shams; 15. Paul Sekfy; 16. Pamela Ward; 17. Stef Chalmers; 18. Greg Davis; 19. Tori McGregor; 20. Lynne Fairey; 21. Lorraine Fordham | 1. Natasha Maclaren-Jones* (Lib); 2. **Bronnie Taylor*** (Nat); 3. **Chris Rath*** (Lib); 4. Susan Carter* (Lib); 5. **Ben Franklin*** (Nat); 6. Jacqui Munro* (Lib); 7. Rachel Merton* (Lib); 8. **Scott Barrett** (Nat); 9. Jag Dhaliwal (Lib); 10. Sophie White (Lib); 11. Ben Niland (Nat); 12. Ying Li-Cantwell (Lib); 13. Vicky McGahey (Lib); 14. Mirjana Cestar (Lib); 15. Steve Coxhead (Nat) | 1. **Cate Faehrmann***; 2. Amanda Cohn*; 3. Lynda-June Coe; 4. Jim Casey; 5. Trish Frail; 6. Elizabeth Thompson; 7. Jane Scott; 8. Kashmir Miller; 9. Eddie Lloyd; 10. Liz Atkins; 11. Mithra Cox; 12. Jan Davis; 13. Astrid O'Neill; 14. Vida Shahamat; 15. Tony Hickey; 16. Ismet Tastan; 17. Russell Weston; 18. Sylvie Ellsmore | 1. Mark Latham*; 2. Tania Mihailuk; 3. Amit Batish; 4. Colin Grigg; 5. Roger Smith; 6. Steven Tripp; 7. Charlie Fenton; 8. Richard Orchard; 9. Adrian Saker; 10. Vicki Saker; 11. Alan Lanyon; 12. Quenten Roberts; 13. Nicholas Turner; 14. Samuel Donovan; 15. Anastasia Whittaker; 16. Kellie Rugless | 1. **Robert Borsak***; 2. Shane Djuric; 3. Alain Noujaim; 4. Kyle Boddan; 5. Steven Richards; 6. William Thompson; 7. Alexander Powell; 8. Therese Noujaim; 9. Brian Boyle; 10. John Howden; 11. Kelly Lesage; 12. Raffaele Grasso; 13. Angelique Noujaim; 14. Moses El Salim; 15. Mark Van Bysterveld; 16. Grant Cappetta; 17. Joe Rossi |
| AJP candidates | Liberal Democratic candidates | SAP candidates | Legalise Cannabis candidates | IMOP candidates |
| 1. Alison Waters; 2. Louise Ward; 3. Matt Stellino; 4. Catherine Blasonato; 5. Petra Jones; 6. Patrick Murphy; 7. Naomi Woodgate; 8. Ann Janaway; 9. Catherine Ward; 10. Sussannah Waters; 11. Teresa Tomanovsky; 12. Jordy Bertram; 13. Kramer Thompson; 14. Ellie Robertson; 15. Christine Hahn; 16. Kate Paterson; 17. Lana Mueller | 1. John Ruddick*; 2. Millie Fontana; 3. Natalie Dumer; 4. Clinton Mead; 5. Elvis Sinosic; 6. John Larter; 7. Michael Wheeler; 8. Peter Whelan; 9. Phillip Beazley; 10. Michael Graham; 11. Robert Cribb; 12. Cameron Shamsabad; 13. Peter Runge; 14. Charles Rios; 15. Samuel Gunning; 16. Joaquim De Lima; 17. Matthew Manning | 1. William Bourke; 2. Hana Oh; 3. Bradd Morelli; 4. Deborah Smythe; 5. Herman Kuipers; 6. Xiaowei Yue; 7. Torsten Landwehr; 8. John Alden; 9. Lisa Hilleard; 10. Peter Reid; 11. Jill Green; 12. Ann Burke; 13. Mike Cottee; 14. David Taylor; 15. Susan Kitchener; 16. Michael Wilder; 17. Alison Noonan; 18. Robert Eggleton; 19. Cheryl Blacker; 20. Alan Magnusson; 21. Dean Winter | 1. Jeremy Buckingham*; 2. James Mathison; 3. Gail Hester; 4. Michael Balderstone; 5. Karen Burge; 6. Frances Hood; 7. Ross Smith; 8. Lincoln Ellis; 9. Nicole Lindner; 10. Elyas Dakhli; 11. Kathleen Williamson; 12. Ian Eden; 13. Louise Graves; 14. Donald Fuggle; 15. Max Green; 16. Michael Harper; 17. Crystal Best; 18. Reece Reynolds | 1. Michael O'Neill; 2. Marelle Burnum Burnum; 3. Lesley Kinney; 4. Kevin Mund; 5. Allison Dvies; 6. Robyn Curnow; 7. Megan Bennetts; 8. Christeena Middleton; 9. Karen Burke; 10. Gerard O'Neill; 11. Wan Otto; 12. Benjamin Fox; 13. Craig Grech; 14. Monica Shepherd; 15. Graham Taylor; 16. Karen Tittelbach; 17. Ian Davies; 18. John Fenwick |
| EFI candidates | Public Education candidates | Socialist candidates | Group A candidates (Note: Endorsed by unregistered Family First Party.) | Group B candidates (Note: Endorsed by unregistered United Australia Party.) |
| 1. Elizabeth Farrelly; 2. Teresa Russell; 3. Sunil Badami; 4. Philippa Murray; 5. Hugo Chan; 6. Jennifer Crawford; 7. Anne Crawford; 8. Caroline Pidcock; 9. Julie Walton; 10. Jane Stanham; 11. Rose Ricketson; 12. Andrew Potts; 13. Deni McKenzie; 14. Marie Sheehan; 15. Freddy Sharpe; 16. Edilla Ford | 1. Khalil Kay; 2. Cheryl McBride; 3. Anne Flint; 4. Peter Furness; 5. Edith McNally; 6. Barbara Reynolds; 7. Penelope Hackett; 8. Warren Poole; 9. Neil Robertson; 10. Sue Robertson; 11. Gemma Ackroyd; 12. Hugh Ackroyd; 13. Sandi Steep; 14. Harry Fox; 15. Lynne Fox; 16. Kerryanne Knox; 17. Vicki Walsh | 1. Steve O'Brien; 2. Paula Sanchez; 3. Andrew Chuter; 4. Samantha Ashby; 5. Joel McAlear; 6. Steffi Leedham; 7. Jim McIlroy; 8. Coral Wynter; 9. Isaac Nellist; 10. Pip Hinman; 11. Peter Boyle; 12. Federico Fuentes; 13. Ben Radford; 14. Duncan Roden; 15. James Wyner | 1. Lyle Shelton; 2. Barbara Helvadjian; 3. Don Modarelli; 4. Richard Stretton; 5. Jamie Green; 6. Robyn Butt; 7. Graham McLennan; 8. Craig Dengate; 9. Nathaniel Marsh; 10. Tracey Bradbury; 11. Penelope Windeyer; 12. Benjamin Irawan; 13. Prue Duignan; 14. Glen Ryan; 15. Michael Chaplin | 1. Craig Kelly; 2. Andrew Robertson; 3. Rosemary Saad; 4. Anne Khoury; 5. Dean Macklin; 6. Robert Nalbandian; 7. Amber Robertson; 8. M Wrightson; 9. Philip Kelly |
| Group E candidates (Note: Endorsed by the unregistered Call To Freedom Party.) | Group G candidates (Note: Endorsed by unregistered Revive Australia Party (Fred Nile Alliance).) (Note: Previously associated with the now-dissolved Christian Democratic Party.) | Group K candidates | Group P candidates | Group T candidates (Note: Endorsed by unregistered Christians For Community.) |
| 1. Milan Maksimovic; 2. Deborah Lions; 3. Mianda Villatora | 1. Silvana Nile; 2. **Fred Nile** | 1. Oscar Grenfell; 2. Mike Head | 1. Danny Lim; 2. Lee Lim | 1. Milton Caine; 2. Robert Skillin |
| Group U candidates (Note: Endorsed by unregistered AustraliaOne.) | Ungrouped candidates | | | |
| 1. Riccardo Bosi; 2. David Graham; 3. Jackie George; 4. Franco Todisco; 5. David Heath; 6. Garry McKinlay; 7. Frank Kloepfer; 8. Reagan Kloepfer; 9. Robyn George; 10. Logan George; 11. Scott Bowden; 12. Kevin Walker; 13. Luke George; 14. Brad Kirkels; 15. Barbara Kafer; 16. Noel Anderson; 17. Matt Polin; 18. Josephine Fsadni | Stefan Prasad; Colleen Fuller; Warren Grzic; Van Huynh; Archie Lea; Michelle Martin; Lee Howe (Note: Endorsed by unregistered Homes First.); Mick Allen; R Cheetham; Guitang Lu; George Potkonyak | | | |

== Disendorsements and resignations ==
| Date | Party | Candidate | Seat | Details |
|---|---|---|---|---|
| 12 March | National | Ash Barnham | Cessnock | Disendorsed for misogynistic and racist social media posts. |
| 13 March | Liberal | Matt Squires | Wyong | Disendorsed for homophobic, Islamophobic and anti-vaccine social media posts. |
| 23 March | SFF | Sean Ambrose | Heathcote | Disendorsed for support of Vladimir Putin and Russian invasion of Ukraine. |
