= Results of the 2019 New South Wales Legislative Council election =

Legislative Council election for New South Wales, Australia in March 2019

2019 New South Wales state election (Legislative Council)
- 26 March 2019

21 of the 42 seats on the Legislative Council 21 seats needed for a majority
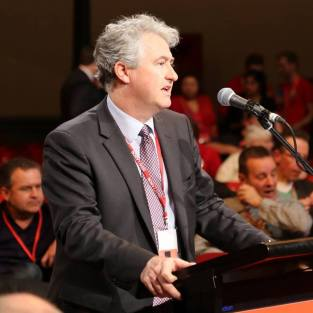

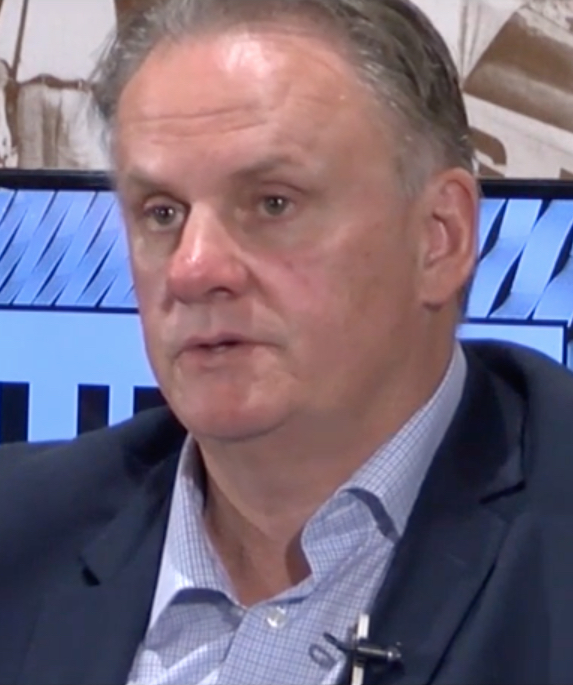

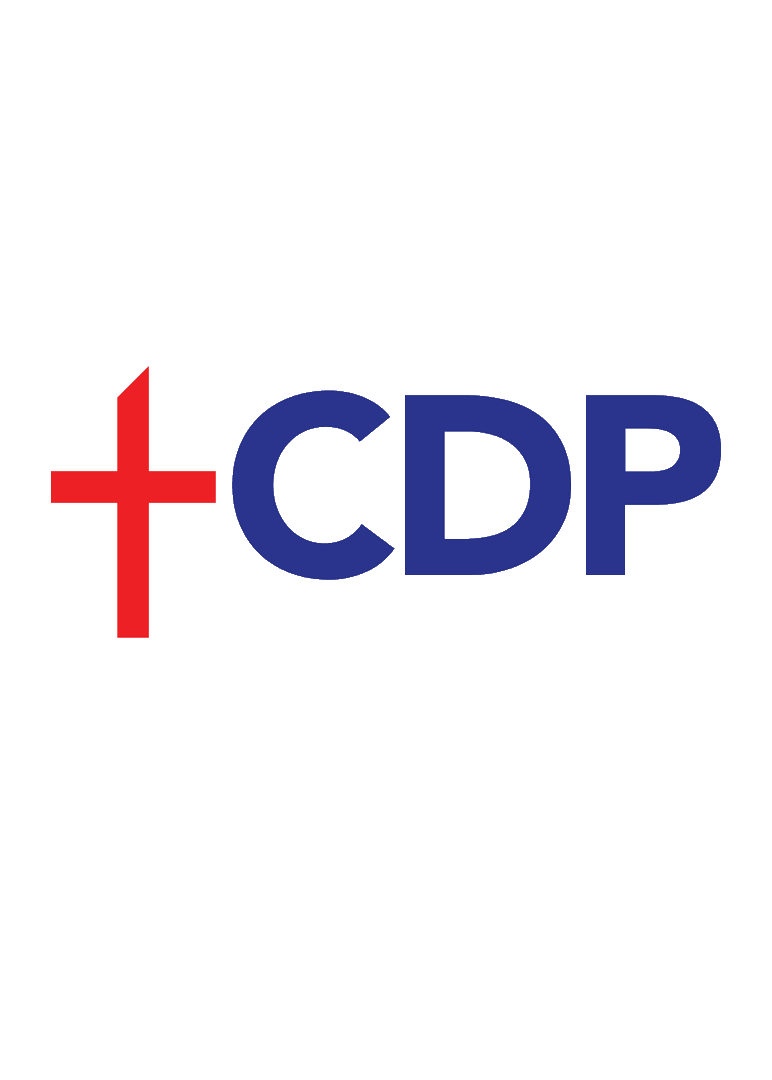
	First party	Second party	Third party
	L/NP
Leader	Don Harwin	Adam Searle	None
Party	Coalition	Labor	Greens
Seats before	19	12	3
Seats won	8	7	2
Seats after	17	14	3
Seat change	▼3	▲2	Steady
Popular vote	1,549,751	1,321,449	432,999
Percentage	34.82%	29.69%	9.73%
Swing	▼7.80pp	▼1.40pp	▼0.19pp
	Fourth party	Fifth party	Sixth party
		SFF
Leader	Mark Latham	Robert Borsak	Fred Nile
Party	One Nation	SFF	CDP
Seats before	0	2	2
Seats won	2	1	0
Seats after	2	2	1
Seat change	▲2	▲1	▼1
Popular vote	306,933	246,477	101,328
Percentage	6.90%	5.54%	2.28%
Swing	▲6.90pp	▲1.65pp	▼0.56pp
	Seventh party
	AJP
Leader	None
Party	Animal Justice
Seats before	1
Seats won	1
Seats after	2
Seat change	▲1
Popular vote	86,713
Percentage	1.95%
Swing	▲0.17pp

This is a list of results for the Legislative Council at the 2019 New South Wales state election.

Candidates of six parties were elected in the end. The quota was 202,325.

The final result was performed by computer on 12 April 2019.

== Results ==
2019 New South Wales state election: Legislative Council
Party	Candidate	Votes	%	±%
Quota		202,325		
Liberal/National Coalition	1. Catherine Cusack (Lib) (elected 1); 2. Niall Blair (Nat) (elected 6); 3. Damien Tudehope (Lib) (elected 9); 4. Taylor Martin (Lib) (elected 11); 5. Sarah Mitchell (Nat) (elected 13); 6. Natalie Ward (Lib) (elected 15); 7. Natasha Maclaren-Jones (Lib) (elected 17); 8. Wes Fang (Nat) (elected 18); 9. Peter Phelps (Lib); 10. Alan Akhurst (Lib); 11. Steven de Gunst (Nat); 12. Pallavi Sinha (Lib); 13. Pat Daley (Lib); 14. Amy Lee (Lib); 15. John Chanter (Nat)	1,549,751	34.82	−7.80
Labor	1. Tara Moriarty (elected 2); 2. Penny Sharpe (elected 7); 3. Greg Donnelly (elected 10); 4. Anthony D'Adam (elected 12); 5. Daniel Mookhey (elected 14); 6. Peter Primrose (elected 16); 7. Mark Buttigieg (elected 19); 8. Julie Sibraa; 9. Michelle Miran; 10. Tri Vo; 11. Sally Sitou; 12. Charlie Sheahan; 13. Aruna Chandrala; 14. Paul Sekfy; 15. Peter Kim; 16. Sabrin Farooqui; 17. Sharon Sewell; 18. Vanessa Keenan; 19. Ann Martin; 20. Kim Weller; 21. Pamela Ward	1,321,449	29.69	−1.40
Greens	1. David Shoebridge (elected 3); 2. Abigail Boyd (elected 8); 3. Dawn Walker; 4. Dominic Kanak; 5. Jane Scott; 6. Tom Kiat; 7. Monica Tan; 8. Tony Hickey; 9. Shaun Middlebrook; 10. Louise Ihlein; 11. Vicki Ross; 12. Philipa Veitch; 13. Tony Adams; 14. Louise Steer; 15. Rochelle Porteous; 16. Colin Hesse; 17. Roz Chia; 18. Lynne Saville; 19. Cath Blakey; 20. Adrian Jones; 21. Philippa Clark	432,999	9.73	−0.79
One Nation	1. Mark Latham (elected 4); 2. Rod Roberts (elected 21); 3. Mick Jackson; 4. Janet Kayes; 5. Jason Ross; 6. Bob Bourne; 7. Lynette Roberts; 8. Vicki Saker; 9. Adrian Saker; 10. Greville Bogard; 11. Peter Rees; 12. Cameron Roberts; 13. Damian Ottley; 14. Brian Olliver; 15. Quenten Roberts; 16. Margaret Cox; 17. John Cox	306,933	6.90	+6.90
Shooters, Fishers, Farmers	1. Mark Banasiak (elected 5); 2. Brett Cooke; 3. Holli Thomas; 4. Diane Cotroneo; 5. Alain Noujaim; 6. Raymond Mulligan; 7. Peter Richards; 8. Daniel Spears; 9. Benjamin Smith; 10. Kirsty Single; 11. Jason Lesage; 12. Jacqui Wood; 13. Howard Farrell; 14. Karen Romano; 15. Ray Hawkins; 16. John Howden; 17. Bob Shaw; 18. David Cook	246,477	5.54	+1.65
Christian Democrats	1. Paul Green; 2. Aaron Wright; 3. Lara Taouk Sleiman; 4. Ross Clifford; 5. Luke Cubis; 6. Matthew Burton; 7. Beth Smith; 8. Graeme Young; 9. Kiah Oosterbeek; 10. Benjamin Mirza; 11. Helen Clarke; 12. Lesley Kadwell; 13. Tania Piper; 14. Peter Banks; 15. Michelle Green; 16. Anne Argaet; 17. Gregory Clarke; 18. Cecille Coan; 19. Charles Knox	101,328	2.28	−0.65
Liberal Democrats	1. David Leyonhjelm; 2. Duncan Spender; 3. Codie Neville; 4. Andrew Hows; 5. Peter Runge; 6. Robert Nickols; 7. Charles Rios; 8. Joaquim De Lima; 9. Luke Zahra; 10. Clinton Mead; 11. Dax Love; 12. Charlie Chen; 13. Alan Bron; 14. James Klauzner; 15. James Pirie; 16. Samuel Duncan; 17. Keith Francis	96,999	2.18	+2.18
Animal Justice	1. Emma Hurst (elected 20); 2. Angela Pollard; 3. Greg Pointing; 4. Petra Jones; 5. Leon Gross; 6. Karl Hosking; 7. Charlotte Ward; 8. Ian Underwood; 9. Kathleen Costello; 10. Bryan McGrath; 11. Benjamin Costello; 12. Jason Whalley; 13. Susanne Briggs; 14. David Atwell; 15. Temple Eyre; 16. Timothy Summerson; 17. Carol Bellenger; 18. Christopher Moses; 19. William Waters	86,713	1.95	+0.17
Keep Sydney Open	1. Tyson Koh; 2. Jess Miller; 3. Jesse Matheson; 4. Daniel McNamee; 5. Tori Levett; 6. Wendell French; 7. Emily Nicol; 8. Stavros Yiannoukas; 9. Max Becker; 10. Jordan Smith; 11. Allison Sims; 12. Bianca Esteban; 13. Stephan Gyory; 14. Eoin Maher; 15. Matthew White; 16. Hugo Ferrer; 17. James Heathwood; 18. Katie Green; 19. Wei Thai-Haynes; 20. Louisa Parmeter; 21. Brian Walker-Catchpole	81,508	1.83	+1.83
Sustainable Australia	1. William Bourke; 2. Alexander Kreet; 3. Xiaowei Yue; 4. Ann Burke; 5. Torsten Landwehr; 6. Jenny Goldie; 7. Wing In (Catherine) Lui; 8. Bradd Morelli; 9. Alison Noonan; 10. Warren Grzic; 11. Chris O'Rourke; 12. John Alden; 13. Ashley Brunner; 14. Mike Cottee; 15. Kerry Waight; 16. Peter Reid; 17. Jill Green; 18. Michael Wilder; 19. Anthea Kerrison; 20. Alan Magnusson; 21. Dean Winter	65,102	1.46	+1.46
Voluntary Euthanasia	1. Shayne Higson; 2. Luke Ditchfield; 3. Penelope Hackett; 4. Julie Hanley; 5. David Newman; 6. Jessica Edwards; 7. David Pieper; 8. Jan Edwards; 9. Sharon Potocnik; 10. Bill Winning; 11. Jo Langham; 12. Brian Beaumont Owles; 13. Kym Kilpatrick; 14. Judith Daley; 15. Sandi Steep; 16. Kath Schilling	46,971	1.06	+0.11
Small Business	1. Angela Vithoulkas; 2. John Gereige; 3. Dianne Coleman; 4. Gary Adamson; 5. Harrison Finch; 6. Paula Wynyard; 7. Hoai Nguyen; 8. Helen Preketes; 9. James Tsolakis; 10. Constentine Vithoulkas; 11. Julia Campbell; 12. Jillian Pamplin; 13. Brett Nickisson; 14. Rhaad Fogarty; 15. Todd Matthews; 16. Tony Stevis; 17. Tatiana Coulter; 18. Frank Douskou	30,409	0.68	+0.68
Conservatives	1. Greg Walsh; 2. Ben Irawan; 3. Colin Grigg; 4. Robert Elliott; 5. Sonia Hibbert; 6. Tim Cairns; 7. Eric Lee; 8. Aaron Binns; 9. Daniel De Vries; 10. Samantha Samrani; 11. Sally-Anne Vincent; 12. Igor Palmer; 13. Cheryl Sardar; 14. Miguel Ribeiro; 15. Hengki Widjaja; 16. Allan Vincent; 17. Laclan McLean	26,303	0.59	+0.59
Flux	1. Max Kaye; 2. Ben Rushton; 3. Jason Gavriel; 4. Mansour Soltani; 5. Shane Greenup; 6. Kipling Crossing; 7. Ben Ballingall; 8. Jessica Payne; 9. Liam Jarvis; 10. Adam Ross-Hopkins; 11. Thomas Sesselmann; 12. Jesse Hanna; 13. Christopher May; 14. Jordon Dearing; 15. Adrian Guerrera	16,212	0.36	+0.36
Socialist Alliance	1. Rachel Evans; 2. Peter Boyle; 3. Sam Ashby; 4. Andrew Chuter; 5. Paula Sanchez; 6. Phil Craig; 7. Pip Hinman; 8. Raul Bassi; 9. Margaret Gleeson; 10. Jim McIlroy; 11. Coral Wynter; 12. Zebedee Parkes; 13. Semra Coban; 14. Duncan Roden; 15. Topia Ryan-Jones; 16. Joel McAlear; 17. Nicole McGregor; 18. John Coleman	14,194	0.32	+0.12
Group L	1. Jeremy Buckingham; 2. David Quince; 3. Jane Macallister; 4. John Watts; 5. Michele McKenzie; 6. Melinda Wilson; 7. Janelle Baylis; 8. Pete Wills; 9. Craig Shaw; 10. Chris Winslow; 11. Antony Lewis; 12. Mark Hutton; 13. Lorraine Beck; 14. Eve-Lyn Kennedy; 15. Patrick Darley-Jones	11,793	0.26	+0.26
Seniors United	1. Chris Osborne; 2. Warwick Stacey; 3. Ikaros Kyriacou; 4. Helen Ducker; 5. Kyriakos Koliadis; 6. Margaret Chaffey; 7. Paul Gerantonis; 8. Steven Campbell; 9. Frank Fitzpatrick; 10. John Tzemopoulos; 11. Christine Patrech; 12. Andrew Demas; 13. Neil Smith; 14. Nick Agnew; 15. Mark Osborne; 16. John Snell	6,543	0.15	+0.15
Advance Australia	1. Raymond Brown; 2. Ian Chandler; 3. Trisha Clements; 4. Kevin Cranfield; 5. Luke Van Jour; 6. Trina Rowston; 7. Geoffrey Craig; 8. Simon Costigan; 9. Eva Emrich; 10. Joel Marchant; 11. Michael O'Donnell; 12. Leslea Brown; 13. Benjamin Carruthers; 14. David Walter; 15. Helen Boland	3,928	0.09	-0.84 (Note: Combined vote totals of Building Australia (0.29%) and the Motorist Party (0.64%), of which Advance Australia is a merger)
James Jansson Team for NSW	1. James Jansson; 2. Andrea Leong; 3. Eve Slavich; 4. Brendan Clarke; 5. Liviu Constantinescu; 6. Saritha Manickam; 7. Majella Morello; 8. James Oberg; 9. Michael Maroske; 10. Raymond Zeng; 11. Daniel Powell; 12. Markus Pfister; 13. Aaron Hammond; 14. Michael Wigham; 15. Robyn Finno; 16. Nathan Page; 17. Jay Christiaens	3,207	0.07	+0.07
Group H	1. Anthony Monaghan; 2. Sharni Monaghan	322	0.01	+0.01
Independent	Danny Lim	644	0.01	
Independent	Tony Edwards	643	0.01	
Independent	Ellie Robertson	248	0.01	
Independent	Andre Brokman	145	0.00	
Independent	Ron Bogan	126	0.00	
Independent	Bryn Hutchinson	75	0.00	
Independent	John Hunter	65	0.00	
Independent	John Brett	59	0.00	
Total formal votes		4,451,146	93.65	
Informal votes		301,681	6.35	
Turnout		4,451,146	90.16	

== Continuing members ==
The following members of the Legislative Council were not up for re-election this year.

Party	Member
Labor	John Graham
Labor	Courtney Houssos
Labor	Shaoquett Moselmane
Labor	Adam Searle
Labor	Walt Secord
Labor	Mick Veitch
Labor	Lynda Voltz
Liberal	John Ajaka
Liberal	Lou Amato
Liberal	Scott Farlow
Liberal	Don Harwin
Liberal	Shayne Mallard
Liberal	Matthew Mason-Cox
National	Ben Franklin
National	Trevor Khan
National	Bronnie Taylor
Greens	Cate Faehrmann
Greens	Justin Field (Note: This figure includes Justin Field MLC, who was not up for election this year. He left the Greens to sit as an independent in April 2019, before the final composition of the Council was determined.)
Christian Democrats	Fred Nile
Shooters, Fishers, Farmers	Robert Borsak
Animal Justice	Mark Pearson

== See also ==
- Results of the 2019 New South Wales state election (Legislative Assembly)
- Candidates of the 2019 New South Wales state election
- Members of the New South Wales Legislative Council, 2019–2023
