= 2023 New South Wales state election =

- 25 March 2023

All 93 seats in the Legislative Assembly and 21 (of the 42) seats in the Legislative Council 47 Assembly seats needed for a majority
- Opinion polls
- Registered: 5,521,688
- Turnout: 4,861,148 (88.04%) (▼2.96 pp)
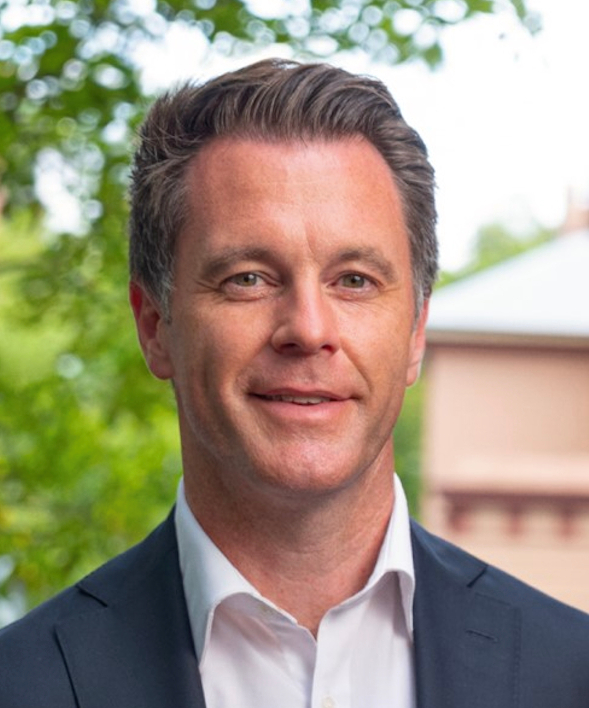

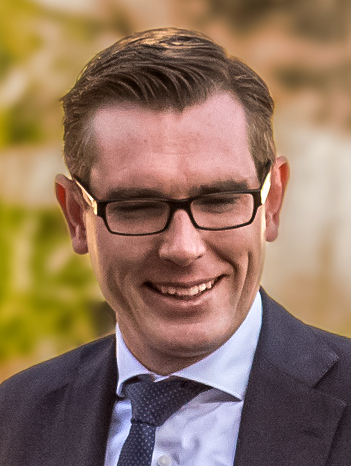

	First party	Second party	Third party
Leader	Chris Minns	Dominic Perrottet	No leader
Party	Labor	Liberal	Greens
Alliance		Liberal–National Coalition
Leader since	4 June 2021	5 October 2021	N/A
Leader's seat	Kogarah	Epping	N/A
Last election	36 seats	48 seats	3 seats
Seats before	36 (Note: Labor won the Liberal-held seat of Bega in February 2022, putting their total at 37 seats. In October 2022 Labor MP for Bankstown resigned from the party (later joining One Nation), bringing the total Labor seats back to 36.)	45 (Note: Since the previous election the Liberal Party has had two sitting MPs resign from the party (John Sidoti, Gareth Ward) and lost the 2022 Bega by-election.)	3
Seats won	45	36	3
Seat change	▲9	▼12	Steady
Preferential vote	1,738,081	1,663,215	455,960
Percentage	36.97%	35.37%	9.70%
Swing	▲3.66	▼6.21	▲0.13
TPP	54.26%	45.74%
TPP swing	▲6.29	▼6.29
Premier before election
Dominic Perrottet
Liberal–National Coalition
Subsequent Premier
Chris Minns
Labor

The 2023 New South Wales state election was held on 25 March 2023 to elect the 58th Parliament of New South Wales, including all 93 seats in the Legislative Assembly and 21 of the 42 seats in the Legislative Council. The election was conducted by the New South Wales Electoral Commission (NSWEC).

The incumbent minority Liberal–National Coalition government, led by Premier Dominic Perrottet, sought to win a fourth successive four-year term in office but was defeated by the Labor Party, led by Opposition Leader Chris Minns. The Greens, the Shooters, Fishers and Farmers Party, other minor parties and several independents also contested the election.

The outcome was the first Labor government in the state in 12 years, ending the longest period of Coalition government in New South Wales history.

The election was also the second time in history that the Australian Labor Party had gained control of the entirety of mainland Australia at the federal and state levels simultaneously (leaving Tasmania as the only state with a Liberal government), a feat that had last been achieved in 2007.

Though the Coalition was defeated, Labor was unable to win enough seats to govern with a majority, resulting in a hung parliament. However, Labor was able to form government with the support of independent MPs Alex Greenwich, Greg Piper, and Joe McGirr, who guaranteed Labor confidence and supply. Piper also made an agreement with Labor to become the Speaker of the Legislative Assembly, having previously served as a deputy speaker.

New South Wales has compulsory voting, with optional preferential, instant runoff voting in single-member electorates for the lower house, and single transferable voting with optional preferential above-the-line voting in the proportionally represented upper house.

The online voting system iVote was not used in the election. The NSW government had suspended the use of iVote after the 2021 NSW local council elections saw five wards affected by access outages, with three significant enough that an analysis suggested there was a 60% chance the wrong candidate had been elected. As a result, the NSW Supreme Court ordered that those elections be voided and re-run.

== Background ==
=== Previous election ===
At the 2019 election, the Coalition had won a third term in government for the first time since 1971, and Gladys Berejiklian became the first woman in New South Wales to lead a party to a state election victory. The Liberals won 35 seats, while the Nationals won 13 seats, giving the Coalition a combined total of 48 seats, one more than the minimum required for a majority.

The Labor Party won 36 seats and overtook the Liberals to become the largest single party in the Legislative Assembly. However, the party only managed to gain two seats from the Coalition, Coogee and Lismore.

The Greens strengthened their hold on the three seats they held prior to the election while the Shooters, Fishers and Farmers held onto Orange, a seat the party had won from the Nationals at a by-election, while also taking Barwon and Murray from the Nationals.

Independents Greg Piper and Alex Greenwich both retained their seats of Lake Macquarie and Sydney, respectively, while Joe McGirr successfully held on to the seat of Wagga Wagga he won in a by-election.

=== Change of premiership, resignations and minority government ===
Internal splits within the government became apparent in August and September 2020, when proposed laws protecting the habitats of koalas resulted in Nationals leader John Barilaro threatening to refuse to support government legislation and sit on the crossbench, while still holding ministerial positions. Berejiklian threatened to sack all Nationals ministers if they did not abandon their plan by 11 September 2020. Following a meeting between the Premier and Deputy Premier on the morning of 11 September, the Nationals backed down on their decision to move to the crossbench.

On 1 October 2021, Berejiklian resigned as Premier following the launch of an Independent Commission Against Corruption (ICAC) investigation into her having possibly breached public trust or encouraged corrupt behaviour during her relationship with the former member of Wagga Wagga, Daryl Maguire. At a subsequent Liberal party room meeting, Liberal deputy leader and New South Wales Treasurer Dominic Perrottet was chosen as her successor. Findings about the case were not released prior to the election. Despite this, Berejiklian still recorded high approval ratings, with psephologist Antony Green even claiming that should she have remained Premier, the Coalition would have been the favourites to win the election.

The government initially held a two-seat majority, which was technically only a one-seat majority with the omission of Liberal member Jonathan O'Dea as Speaker, who only has a casting vote. In May 2021 the government lost its majority on the floor of the parliament as Minister for Families, Communities and Disability Services Gareth Ward resigned from the ministry and moved to the crossbench after identifying himself as being the subject of an inquiry by the New South Wales Police Force's sex crimes and child abuse squad, for which he was later charged with offences. Ward denied the allegations, though in March 2022 he was suspended from the parliament, which remains in effect until the conclusion of the criminal proceedings. Less than two months prior to Ward's resignation from the ministry, Liberal member for Drummoyne John Sidoti also moved to the crossbench to sit as an independent, after ICAC announced it would open an inquiry into his personal property dealings. Both Sidoti and Ward's resignations meant the government was officially in minority status. This status was further cemented in February 2022, when the Liberals lost the seat of Bega at a by-election to the Labor Party, causing the Coalition to slip to 45 seats in the 93-seat Assembly.

In March 2022 a bill moved by the Greens, to change the state's constitution and allow MPs to meet virtually during a declared emergency such as a pandemic, passed the parliament and in so doing, became the first non-government bill opposed by the government to pass the parliament since the Liberal/National Coalition came to power at the 2011 state election. The following month the Opposition Leader Chris Minns stated the Labor Party would not move or support a motion of no confidence against the government or seek to deny it supply, indicating the government would be able to serve the full term and avoid a snap election. The success of the teal independents at the 2022 federal election prompted concern from Liberal MPs Tim James and Matt Kean, and along with other concerns caused Perrottet to portray himself as increasingly moderate.

On 29 March 2022 the Supreme Court of NSW dissolved the Christian Democratic Party. The race was the first NSW state election since 1981 at which the Christian Democratic Party ("Call to Australia" prior to 1998) did not contest.

On 20 October 2022 Tania Mihailuk MP resigned from the NSW Labor Party and announced on 17 January 2023, that she would be running second on the One Nation ticket in the election for the Legislative Council, behind party leader Mark Latham.

From a poll that followed the Nazi uniform scandal, 67% said it didn't make a difference to their vote, 20% said it would make them less likely to vote for the Coalition and 8% said the scandal would make them more likely to vote for the Coalition.

=== Possibility of a hung parliament ===
It was widely predicted that the election would lead to a hung parliament, meaning that a party wishing to form government must obtain confidence and supply from crossbenchers. The Greens were almost certain to side with Labor, while the three ex-Shooters, Fishers and Farmers party independents would have likely sided with the Coalition. Three other independents (Alex Greenwich, Greg Piper and Joe McGirr) had given confidence and supply to the Coalition. After the election, the three confirmed that they would give confidence and supply to Labor should it be required, as Labor only won 45 seats, two seats short of a majority.

== Campaign ==
On 12 January Premier Dominic Perrottet revealed that he had worn a Nazi uniform as fancy dress at his 21st birthday, apologising at a media conference after a cabinet minister was made aware of the incident. This announcement received extensive media coverage. Despite the scandal, Perrottet received the support of his ministerial colleagues, and Labor leader Chris Minns chose not to call for Perrottet's resignation. Robert Borsak, the leader of the Shooters, Fishers and Farmers Party, publicly threatened to refer Perrottet to police over the incident.

On 5 March 2023, the NSW Labor Party held their official campaign launch.

On 9 March a significant outage of the Sydney rail network caused by a communications failure saw Perrottet to apologise to customers and offer a fare-free day.

On 11 March the Greens NSW had their campaign launch, where they listed their balance of power objectives.

On 12 March the Liberal Party held their official campaign launch.

On 14 March confidential documents from KPMG and Clayton Utz consultants regarding the privatisation of Sydney Water were made public. Perrottet, who was the Treasurer at the time had previously declared in March 2020 that he had no plans to even do a study on privatisation, but the documents revealed that studies had taken place in January 2020 and later in November 2021, with the reporting making it clear the study was done due to direct pressure from the Government. The issue was widely discussed in Sydney newspapers and on right-wing talkback radio where commentators slammed the potential privatisation and declared that Perrottet was lying about his "lack of plans" to privatise Sydney Water.

On 21 March it was reported that Perrottet had been accused of seeking special treatment via the health minister when requesting ambulance services.

Labor recommended its supporters preference the Shooters, Fishers and Farmers Party to counter One Nation in some seats.

Upon conceding defeat to Labor leader Minns, Perrottet stated that this election had been a contest of ideas, while congratulating Minns and stating that this election campaign was a "race to the top".

=== Policies ===
In the election campaign, Chris Minns and Labor made election promises to invest further into public services and remove a wage cap set for public sector workers. They promised a $60 weekly toll cap. They also promised $315 in energy rebates for small businesses.

Minns was criticised for being reluctant to promise reform on money laundering in gambling, however on 16 January, Minns released a plan to reform gambling, banning donations from clubs to political parties and promising a cashless gaming card trial, which would last for 12 months and cover 500 of the approximately 86,480 (0.58%) pokies machines in the state. Premier Dominic Perrottet and the Liberals announced plans to introduce a cashless gaming card for pokie machines in clubs and pubs in NSW, but a transition period where non-metropolitan pokies may be excluded from the pilot program has been discussed.

One Nation ran on a platform of nuclear power and parental rights.

NSW Labor pledged to enshrine government ownership of Sydney Water in the NSW state constitution, a similar move that the Victorian government was doing with the state's SEC.

The Labor Party promised at this election to invest in a Great Koala National Park in the Mid North Coast to preserve habitat for the endangered species. The party also promised to invest in creating a new national park around the Georges River to protect koalas.

=== Leaders' debates ===
The first leaders' debate was held on Thursday, 9 February 2023 on 2GB. Perrottet was declared the winner, with the support 65% of voters in an online poll following the debate.

A Channel 7 leaders debate between Labor and Liberal leaders was held on 8 March 2023.

A Channel 9 leaders debate between Labor and Liberal leaders was held on 15 March 2023.

A Sky News Australia leaders debate was held on 22 March 2023.

2023 New South Wales state election debates
Date	Organisers	Moderators	P Present		References
Date	Organisers	Moderators	Perrottet	Minns	References
9 February; 05:30 AEDT	2GB Radio Sydney	Ben Fordham	P	P	
8 March; 12:00 AEDT	Seven News	Amelia Brace	P	P	
15 March; 12:00 AEDT	Nine News; The Sydney Morning Herald	Peter Overton	P	P	
22 March; 19:30 AEDT	Sky News Australia; The Daily Telegraph	Kieran Gilbert	P	P	

== Redistribution ==
Comparison between the old and new electoral district boundaries, coloured by party vote in the 2019 state election

The 2015 and 2019 elections were conducted using boundaries set in 2013. The state constitution requires the Electoral Commission to review electoral district boundaries after every two elections, to ensure that the number of voters in each district is within 10 per cent of the "quotient" – the number of voters divided by the number of Legislative Assembly seats. In 2020, the Commission began work on determining new boundaries for the 2023 election, a process commonly known as "redistribution". The projected population quotient in 2023 was 59,244, meaning that each district needed to have between 53,319 and 65,168 enrolled electors.

In November 2020 the proposed redistribution names and boundaries were released to the public for submission. All proposed abolished, created or renamed districts are within Sydney. In August 2021, the final determinations were gazetted.

The Labor-held district of Lakemba was abolished and largely replaced by the adjacent Bankstown. A new district of Leppington in south-west Sydney was created from Camden and Macquarie Fields.

A number of Liberal-held districts were renamed, to reflect the population centre in the districts’ new boundaries:

- Mulgoa – to be renamed Badgerys Creek
- Baulkham Hills – to be renamed Kellyville
- Ku-ring-gai – to be renamed Wahroonga
- Seven Hills – to be renamed Winston Hills

The Liberal-held Heathcote took in parts of the Illawarra from the Labor-held Keira and became a notionally marginal Labor seat.

Current seat	2019 election			New seat	2021 redistribution		
Current seat	Party	Member	Margin	New seat	Party	Member	Margin*
Baulkham Hills	Liberal	David Elliott	18.68	Kellyville	Liberal	Notional	23.1
Heathcote	Liberal	Lee Evans	4.96	Heathcote	Labor	Notional	1.7
Ku-ring-gai	Liberal	Alister Henskens	20.52	Wahroonga	Liberal	Notional	19.0
Lakemba	Labor	Jihad Dib	22.42	Abolished			
New seat				Leppington	Labor	Notional	1.5
Mulgoa	Liberal	Tanya Davies	10.13	Badgerys Creek	Liberal	Notional	9.7
Seven Hills	Liberal	Mark Taylor	6.36	Winston Hills	Liberal	Notional	5.7
*These margins are notional, being calculated by Antony Green to take account of the 2021 redistribution. As such, it may vary from the 2019 election results.

== Registered parties ==
Fifteen parties were registered with the New South Wales Electoral Commission (NSWEC) at the time of the election. Bold text indicates parties elected to parliament at the election.

- **Animal Justice Party**
- **Australian Labor Party**
- Elizabeth Farrelly Independents
- **The Greens NSW**
- Informed Medical Options Party
- Legalise Cannabis NSW
- Liberal Democratic Party
- **Liberal Party of Australia**
- **National Party of Australia**
- **Pauline Hanson's One Nation**
- Public Education Party
- **Shooters, Fishers and Farmers Party**
- Small Business Party
- Socialist Alliance
- Sustainable Australia

== Results ==
Winning party by electorate.

=== Legislative Assembly ===
Legislative Assembly (IRV) – (CV)
Party	Votes	%	Swing	Seats	Change
**Labor**	1,738,081	36.97	▲+3.66	45	▲9
Liberal	1,259,253	26.78	▼–5.21	25	▼10
National	403,962	8.59	▼–1.00	11	▼2
Coalition total	1,663,215	35.37	▼–6.21	36	▼12
Greens	455,960	9.70	▲+0.13	3	Steady
Sustainable Australia	104,697	2.23	▲+0.69	0	Steady
One Nation	84,683	1.80	▲+0.70	0	Steady
Shooters, Fishers and Farmers	73,359	1.56	▼–1.90	0	▼3
Legalise Cannabis	60,057	1.28	New	0	Steady
Animal Justice	51,548	1.10	▼–0.42	0	Steady
Liberal Democrats	39,480	0.84	▲+0.61	0	Steady
Informed Medical Options	11,529	0.25	New	0	Steady
Public Education	4,150	0.09	New	0	Steady
Small Business	2,025	0.04	▼−0.03	0	Steady
Socialist Alliance	1,464	0.03	+0.00	0	Steady
Independents	411,682	8.76	▲+3.98	9	▲6
Formal votes	4,701,930	96.72	▲+0.18	–	–
Informal votes	159,218	3.28	▼−0.18	–	–
Total	4,861,148	–	–	93	–
Registered voters / turnout	5,521,688	88.04	▼−2.96	–	–
Two-party-preferred vote
**Labor**	2,202,922	**54.27**	**▲+6.29**		
Coalition	1,856,227	45.73	▼–6.29		

==== Seats changing hands ====
Italics denotes MPs who did not contest at this election.

Seat	Pre-election			Swing	Post-election		
Seat	Party	Member	Margin	Swing	Margin	Member	Party
Bankstown	One Nation	Tania Mihailuk (Note: Mihailuk resigned from the Labor Party in 2022, becoming an independent. She later joined One Nation to contest the Legislative Council.)	20.5	–0.1 to LIB	20.3	Jihad Dib	Labor
Camden	Liberal	Peter Sidgreaves	7.3	10.3	3.0	Sally Quinnell	Labor
Drummoyne	Independent	John Sidoti (Note: Sidoti was sacked from the Liberal Party in 2021 and was suspended from parliament for corruption.)	13.6	–12.6 to ALP	1.0	Stephanie Di Pasqua	Liberal
East Hills	Liberal	Wendy Lindsay	0.1	1.8	1.7	Kylie Wilkinson	Labor
Heathcote (Note: Heathcote was notionally a marginal Labor seat following a redistribution.)	Liberal	Lee Evans	−1.7	8.3	9.9	Maryanne Stuart	Labor
Monaro	National	Nichole Overall	11.6	13.9	2.3	Steve Whan	Labor
Parramatta	Liberal	Geoff Lee	6.5	15.0	8.6	Donna Davis	Labor
Penrith	Liberal	Stuart Ayres	0.6	2.2	1.6	Karen McKeown	Labor
Riverstone	Liberal	Kevin Conolly	6.2	9.9	3.7	Warren Kirby	Labor
South Coast	Liberal	Shelley Hancock	10.6	14.3	3.8	Liza Butler	Labor
Wakehurst	Liberal	Brad Hazzard	21.9	N/A	4.5	Michael Regan	Independent
Wollondilly	Liberal	Nathaniel Smith	6.0	7.6	1.5	Judy Hannan	Independent

The statewide swing against the Coalition (and the swing to Labor) was highly concentrated in Sydney (particularly in Western Sydney) and on the South Coast. The Nationals lost just one seat (Monaro) and had swings against them in several National strongholds on the Mid North Coast and in the New South Wales countryside. No seats north of the Central Coast changed hands. Both Coalition parties ran candidates in the electorates of Port Macquarie (held by National-turned-Liberal MP Leslie Williams) and Wagga Wagga (held by independent member Joe McGirr). In Port Macquarie (which is a conservative seat even by regional standards), both Coalition parties made the two-party-preferred contest and Williams was re-elected as a Liberal. In Wagga Wagga, McGirr easily defeated the Nationals in the two-party-preferred contest.

Ultimately Labor gained four seats from the Coalition (Camden, Monaro, Parramatta and South Coast) due to swings of over 10 percentage points toward Labor and one seat (Riverstone) due to a swing of over 10 points against the Coalition on first-preference votes. On two-party-preferred measures Labor received a swing against them in five of their own seats (Bankstown, Cabramatta, Liverpool, Shellharbour and Summer Hill), as well as in eight Coalition-held seats (Albury, Badgerys Creek, Bathurst, Coffs Harbour, Cootamundra, Dubbo, Myall Lakes and Upper Hunter). The swing in Liverpool was 9.0 points to the Liberals, bucking the trend set by several other Sydney seats where swings against the Liberals were close to or larger than this.

Despite winning many federal seats in Sydney in 2022, only one teal independent (Judy Hannan in Wollondilly) won a seat at this election. This is likely due to optional preferential voting in New South Wales, meaning voters only need to number one box on the ballot paper (but can choose to number more), as preferences were vital for teal successes at the federal election. However, independents not affiliated with Climate 200 did win several seats; Northern Beaches Mayor Michael Regan gained the seat of Wakehurst from the Liberal Party and several other independents retained their seats (including the SFF-turned-independent members for Barwon, Orange and Murray, as well as the independent members of Lake Macquarie, Sydney and Wagga Wagga). Gareth Ward, a suspended Liberal MP turned independent, successfully held on to his seat of Kiama. The seat of Drummoyne (held by fellow suspended-Liberal-turned-independent John Sidoti, who did not seek re-election) was won by the Liberal challenger Stephanie Di Pasqua, technically retaining the seat for the Coalition, (Note: Sidoti ran and won as the Liberal nominee in 2019 before being suspended.) despite a 12.1% swing to Labor on two-party-preferred preferences.

All three seats held by the Greens were retained, although the party did not gain any seats. They did, however, finish second to Labor in Summer Hill. The seat of Balmain had a swing to Labor on two-party-preferred measures, while the Greens had swings to them in the two-party-preferred contests in their other two seats; Ballina (against the Nationals) and Newtown (against Labor).

One Nation, despite having a statewide swing to them, failed to win as many votes as predicted. However, the party finished second to Labor in Cessnock, a seat where the National Party candidate was disendorsed during the campaign for sexist and racist social media posts.

The Shooters, Fishers and Farmers Party had a statewide swing against them. While they did formerly hold three seats (Barwon, Orange and Murray), the members for these seats defected and became independents over disagreements with the party's leader, Robert Borsak.

On 8 April, two weeks after the election, Liberal Jordan Lane was declared the winner in Ryde, by just 50 votes over Labor candidate Lyndal Howison. This was the last seat to be called, while also ending up as the most marginal seat post-election, sitting at just 0.01% for the Coalition. A recount was held on 15 April 2023, increasing the Liberal lead to 54 votes.

=== Legislative Council ===
Legislative Council (STV) – Quota 209,858 – (CV)
Party	Votes	%	Swing	2023 seats	2019 seats	Total seats	Change
Labor	1,690,445	36.61	▲+6.93	8	7	15	▲1
Liberal/National joint ticket	1,374,857	29.78	▼–5.04	7	8	15	▼2
Greens	419,346	9.08	▼–0.64	2	2	4	▲1
One Nation	273,496	5.92	▼–0.97	1	2	3	▲1
Legalise Cannabis	169,482	3.67	New	1	0	1	▲1
Liberal Democrats	162,755	3.53	▲+1.35	1	0	1	▲1
Shooters, Fishers, Farmers	144,043	3.12	▼–2.42	1	1	2	Steady
Animal Justice	101,183	2.19	▲+0.24	0	1	1	▼1
Elizabeth Farrelly Independents	61,163	1.32	▼−0.51	0	0	0	Steady
Family First	58,361	1.26	New	0	0	0	Steady
Sustainable Australia	42,902	0.93	▼–0.53	0	0	0	Steady
Australia One	35,888	0.78	New	0	0	0	Steady
Public Education	34,523	0.75	New	0	0	0	Steady
Informed Medical Options	21,362	0.46	New	0	0	0	Steady
Socialist Alliance	17,056	0.37	▲+0.05	0	0	0	Steady
United Australia	3,891	0.08	New	0	0	0	Steady
Revive Australia	2,507	0.05	New	0	0	0	▼1
Independent	1,356	0.03	New	0	0	0	Steady
Ungrouped	965	0.02	New	0	0	0	▼1
Call To Freedom	722	0.02	New	0	0	0	Steady
Christians For Community	306	0.01	New	0	0	0	Steady
Socialist Equality	249	0.01	New	0	0	0	Steady
Formal votes	4,616,858	94.31	▲+0.66	–	–	–	–
Informal votes	278,477	5.69	▼−0.66	–	–	–	–
Total	4,895,335	100.00	–	21	21	42	–
Registered voters / turnout	5,521,688	88.66	▼−0.78	–	–	–	–

== Electoral pendulums ==
=== Pre-election pendulum ===
This is an excerpt of the pre-election pendulum, based on notional margins calculated by the ABC's Antony Green. Members in italics did not contest the election as a candidate for the seat they currently hold or its replacement. By-elections were held in some seats during this term of Parliament that changed their margins. See the footnotes for details.

**Liberal/National seats (46)**
**Marginal**
East Hills	Wendy Lindsay	LIB	0.1%
Upper Hunter	Dave Layzell (Note: Dave Layzell was elected to the district of Upper Hunter in the 2021 by-election after the resignation of Michael Johnsen.)	NAT	0.5% (Note: While the redistributed margin based on 2019 results is National 0.5%, the result of the 2021 by-election is a margin of 5.8% for The Nationals.)
Penrith	Stuart Ayres	LIB	0.6%
Goulburn	Wendy Tuckerman	LIB	3.1%
Tweed	Geoff Provest	NAT	5.0%
Winston Hills	Mark Taylor	LIB	5.7%
**Fairly safe**
Holsworthy	Melanie Gibbons	LIB	6.0%
Riverstone	Kevin Conolly	LIB	6.2%
Parramatta	Geoff Lee	LIB	6.5%
Oatley	Mark Coure	LIB	6.8%
Camden	Peter Sidgreaves	LIB	7.3%
Ryde	Victor Dominello	LIB	8.9%
Myall Lakes	Stephen Bromhead	NAT	9.3%
Badgerys Creek	Tanya Davies	LIB	9.7%
**Safe**
South Coast	Shelley Hancock	LIB	10.6%
Coffs Harbour	Gurmesh Singh	NAT	10.8%
Epping	Dominic Perrottet	LIB	11.3%
Monaro	Nichole Overall (Note: Nichole Overall was elected to the district of Monaro in the 2022 by-election after the resignation of John Barilaro.)	NAT	11.6% (Note: While the margin based on 2019 results is 11.6%, with Monaro's boundaries unchanged by the redistribution, the result of the 2022 by-election is a margin of 5.2% for the Nationals.)
Kiama	Gareth Ward (IND)	LIB	12.0%
Terrigal	Adam Crouch	LIB	12.3%
Drummoyne	John Sidoti (IND)	LIB	13.6%

**Labor seats (38)**
**Marginal**
Kogarah	Chris Minns	ALP	0.1%
Leppington	new seat	ALP	1.5%
Heathcote	Lee Evans (LIB)	ALP	1.7%
Lismore	Janelle Saffin	ALP	2.0%
Coogee	Marjorie O'Neill	ALP	2.3%
Londonderry	Prue Car	ALP	3.0%
Bega	Michael Holland (Note: Michael Holland was elected to the district of Bega in the February 2022 by-election after the resignation of Andrew Constance.)	ALP	5.1% (Note: The margin used in the pendulum is Labor's winning margin from the February 2022 by-election, which the Labor Party won with a margin of 5.1%. The margin based on 2019 election results is Liberal 6.9%. Bega's boundaries were unchanged by the redistribution.)
Strathfield	Jason Yat-Sen Li (Note: Jason Yat-Sen Li was elected to the district of Strathfield in the 2022 by-election after the resignation of Jodi McKay.)	ALP	5.2% (Note: While the redistributed margin based on 2019 results is Labor 5.2%, the result of the 2022 by-election is a margin of 5.8% for the Labor Party.)
The Entrance	David Mehan	ALP	5.3%
Port Stephens	Kate Washington	ALP	5.8%
**Fairly safe**
Gosford	Liesl Tesch	ALP	7.1%
Maroubra	Michael Daley	ALP	8.3%
**Crossbench seats (9)**
Murray	Helen Dalton (IND)	SFF	2.8% v NAT
Ballina	Tamara Smith	GRN	4.9% v NAT
Barwon	Roy Butler (IND)	SFF	6.6% v NAT
Balmain	Jamie Parker	GRN	10.0% v ALP
Newtown	Jenny Leong	GRN	11.4% v ALP
Sydney	Alex Greenwich	IND	11.8% v LIB
Orange	Philip Donato (IND)	SFF	15.2% v NAT
Wagga Wagga	Joe McGirr	IND	15.5% v NAT
Lake Macquarie	Greg Piper	IND	23.2% v ALP

=== Post-election pendulum ===
This is an excerpt of the pre-election pendulum, based on the results of the election.

**Labor seats (45)**
Seat	Member	Party	Margin
**Marginal**
Penrith	Karen McKeown	ALP	1.6%
East Hills	Kylie Wilkinson	ALP	1.7%
Monaro	Steve Whan	ALP	2.3% v NAT
Camden	Sally Quinell	ALP	3.0%
Riverstone	Warren Kirby	ALP	3.7%
South Coast	Liza Butler	ALP	3.8%
**Fairly safe**
The Entrance	David Mehan	ALP	7.8%
Liverpool	Charishma Kaliyanda	ALP	8.4%
Parramatta	Donna Davis	ALP	8.6%
Prospect	Hugh McDermott	ALP	8.7%
Leppington	Nathan Hagarty	ALP	8.9%
Heathcote	Maryanne Stuart	ALP	9.9%
**Safe**
Bega	Michael Holland	ALP	10.4%
Cabramatta	Tri Vo	ALP	11.8%

**Liberal/National seats (36)**
Seat	Member	Party	Margin
**Marginal**
Ryde	Jordan Lane	LIB	0.1% (Note: Jordan Lane won the seat by just 54 votes in the two-party-preferred contest against Labor candidate Lyndal Howison. Labor saw an 8.9% swing towards them on two-party-preferences, which was the exact margin that the Liberals won Ryde with in 2019 with Victor Dominello.)
Holsworthy	Tina Ayyad	LIB	0.4%
Pittwater	Rory Amon	LIB	0.7% v IND
Oatley	Mark Coure	LIB	0.8%
Terrigal	Adam Crouch	LIB	1.2%
Goulburn	Wendy Tuckerman	LIB	1.3%
Drummoyne	Stephanie Di Pasqua	LIB	1.3%
Winston Hills	Mark Taylor	LIB	1.8%
Miranda	Eleni Petinos	LIB	2.3%
Willoughby	Tim James	LIB	2.6% v IND
Tweed	Geoff Provest	NAT	3.6%
Upper Hunter	Dave Layzell	NAT	3.8%
Epping	Dominic Perrottet	LIB	4.8%
Manly	James Griffin	LIB	4.8% v IND
Lane Cove	Anthony Roberts	LIB	5.5%
North Shore	Felicity Wilson	LIB	5.7% v IND

**Crossbench seats (12)**
Seat	Member	Party	Margin
**Marginal**
Kiama	Gareth Ward	IND	0.8% v ALP
Wollondilly	Judy Hannan	IND	1.5% v LIB
Balmain	Kobi Shetty	GRN	1.8% v ALP
Wakehurst	Michael Regan	IND	4.5% v LIB
**Fairly safe**
Ballina	Tamara Smith	GRN	7.7% v NAT
**Safe**
Newtown	Jenny Leong	GRN	12.1% v ALP
Sydney	Alex Greenwich	IND	15.6% v ALP
Barwon	Roy Butler	IND	16.0% v NAT
Murray	Helen Dalton	IND	16.0% v NAT
**Very safe**
Orange	Philip Donato	IND	21.9% v NAT
Wagga Wagga	Joe McGirr	IND	22.4% v NAT
Lake Macquarie	Greg Piper	IND	24.1% v ALP

== Candidates and retiring MPs ==
The following members announced they would not be contesting the 2023 election:

=== Labor ===
- Walt Secord MLC – announced 19 August 2022
- Adam Searle MLC – lost preselection 15 September 2022
- Shaoquett Moselmane MLC – did not nominate for endorsement
- Guy Zangari MP (Fairfield) – announced 17 October 2022
- Paul Lynch MP (Liverpool) – not preselected November 2022
- Nick Lalich MP (Cabramatta) – announced 24 December 2022

=== Liberal ===
- Shelley Hancock MP (South Coast) – announced 18 December 2021
- Gabrielle Upton MP (Vaucluse) – announced 6 July 2022
- Kevin Conolly MP (Riverstone) – announced 15 August 2022
- Victor Dominello MP (Ryde) – announced 17 August 2022
- Geoff Lee MP (Parramatta) – announced 22 August 2022
- Jonathan O'Dea MP (Davidson) – announced 6 September 2022
- Rob Stokes MP (Pittwater) – announced 30 September 2022
- David Elliott MP (Baulkham Hills) – announced 22 October 2022
- Brad Hazzard MP (Wakehurst) – announced 24 October 2022
- Matthew Mason-Cox MLC – not preselected 22 December 2022
- Lou Amato MLC – not preselected 22 December 2022
- Shayne Mallard MLC – not preselected 22 December 2022
- Peter Poulos MLC – disendorsed 18 February 2023
- Scott Farlow MLC – not preselected (Note: Farlow assumed the casual vacancy created by Natasha Maclaren-Jones following the election.)

=== Nationals ===
- Stephen Bromhead (Note: Bromhead died on 16 March 2023.) MP (Myall Lakes) – announced 17 August 2022
- Chris Gulaptis MP (Clarence) – announced 22 August 2022
- Melinda Pavey MP (Oxley) – announced 28 August 2022

=== Independent ===
- Justin Field MLC – announced 17 October 2022
- John Sidoti MP (Drummoyne) – announced 24 November 2022

=== Other ===
- Jamie Parker MP (Balmain, Greens) – announced 14 October 2022
- Mark Pearson MLC (Animal Justice Party)

== Polling ==
=== Voting intention ===
==== Graphical summary ====
Aggregate data of voting intention from all opinion polling since the 2019 election. Local regression trends for each party.

=== Primary vote ===
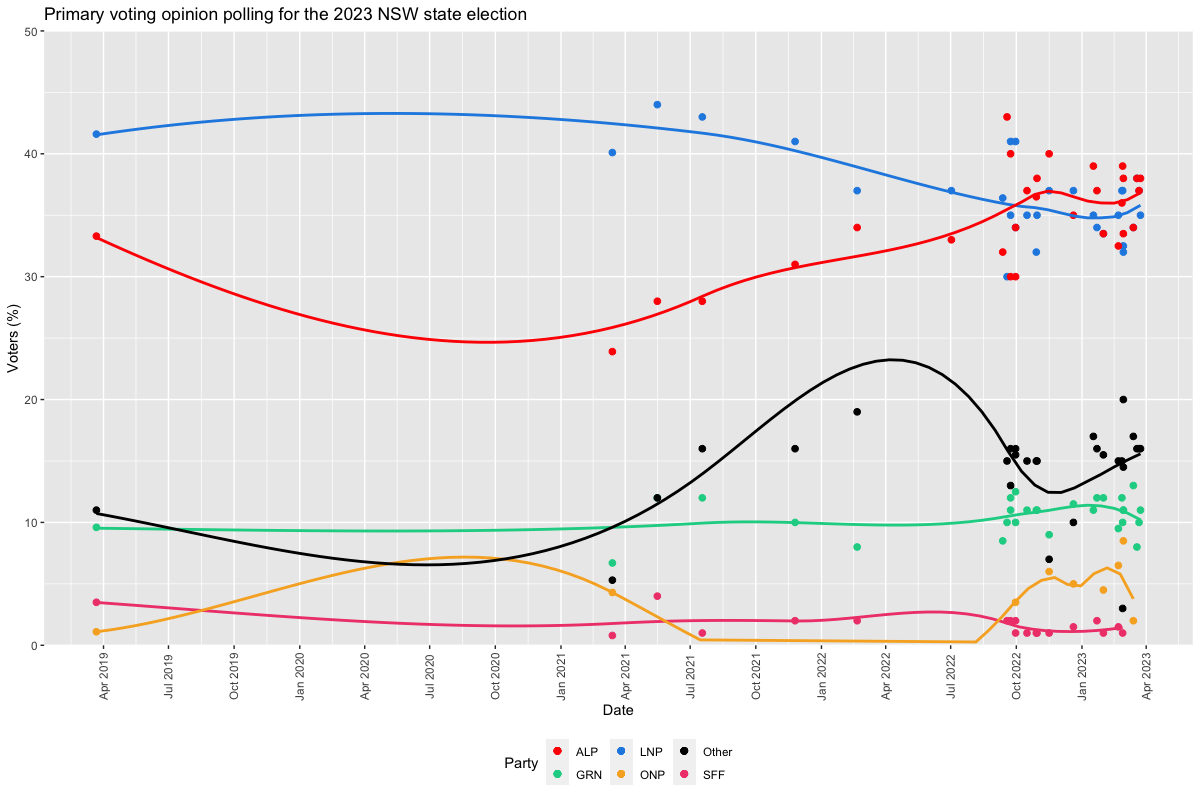

=== Two party preferred ===
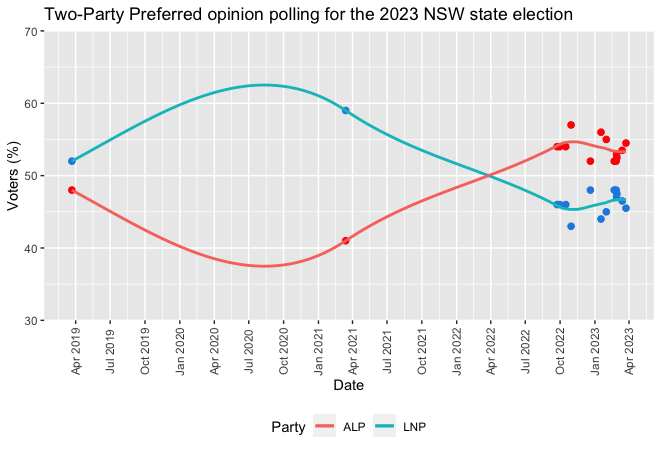

==== Opinion polls ====
Legislative Assembly polling
Date	Firm	Primary vote								TPP vote (Note: Resolve Strategic and Essential do not calculate TPP vote.)	
Date	Firm	LIB	NAT	ALP	GRN	SFF	ONP	OTH	UND	L/NP	ALP
24 March 2023	Newspoll	35%*		38%	11%	—N/a	—N/a	16%	—N/a	45.5%	54.5%
22 March 2023	Freshwater Strategy	37%*		37%	10%	—N/a	—N/a	16%	—N/a	47%	53%
19 March 2023	Resolve Strategic	38%*		38%	8%	—N/a	—N/a	16%	—N/a	—N/a	—N/a
10–14 March 2023	Roy Morgan	34%*		34%	13%	—N/a	2%	17%	—N/a	46.5%	53.5%
24–28 February 2023	Roy Morgan	32.5%*		33.5%	11%	—N/a	8.5%	14.5%	—N/a	47.5%	52.5%
28 February 2023	Resolve Strategic	32%*		38%	11%	—N/a	—N/a	20%	—N/a	—N/a	—N/a
27 February 2023	Freshwater Strategy	37%*		39%	10%	1%	—N/a	13%	—N/a	47%	53%
26 February 2023	Newspoll	37%*		36%	12%	—N/a	—N/a	15%	—N/a	48%	52%
21 February 2023	Roy Morgan	35%*		32.5%	9.5%	1.5%	6.5%	15% (Note: "teal independents" 0.5%, Animal Justice 1.5%, Legalise Cannabis 1%, Liberal Democrats 0.5%, Other parties/independents 11.5%)	—N/a	48%	52%
31 January 2023	Roy Morgan	33.5%*		33.5%	12%	1%	4.5%	15.5% (Note: UAP 1.5%, "teal independents" 1%, Animal Justice 1%, Legalise Cannabis 1%, Liberal Democrats 0.5%, Other parties 10.5%)	—N/a	45%	55%
22 January 2023	Resolve Strategic	34%*		37%	12%	2%	—N/a	16%	—N/a	—N/a	—N/a
14–17 January 2023	YouGov	33%*		39%	11%	—N/a	—N/a	17%	—N/a	44%	56%
20 December 2022	Roy Morgan	37%*		35%	11.5%	1.5%	5%	10% (Note: Animal Justice 0.5%, Legalise Cannabis 0.5%, Liberal Democrats 0.5%, UAP 0.5%, Independents 5.5%, "teal independents" 0.5%, Other parties 2%)	—N/a	48%	52%
16 November 2022	Private polling (Note: Polling was conducted by an unnamed industry group.)	33%	4%	40%	9%	1%	6%	7% (Note: Includes "teal independents" at 4%)	—N/a	—N/a	—N/a
October 2022	Roy Morgan	32%*		36.5%	9.5%	1%	5.5%	13% (Note: Animal Justice 1%, Legalise Cannabis 1.5%, Liberal Democrats 1%, UAP 1%, Independents 8.5%, "teal independents" 1%, Other parties 1.5%)	—N/a	43%	57%
30 October 2022	Resolve Strategic	35%*		38%	11%	1%	—N/a	15%	—N/a	—N/a	—N/a
13–16 October 2022	Freshwater Strategy	36%*		37%	11%	1%	—N/a	15%	—N/a	46%	54%
September 2022	Roy Morgan	34%*		34%	12.5%	1%	3.5%	15.5% (Note: Animal Justice 1.5%, Legalise Cannabis 2%, Liberal Democrats 0.5%, UAP 1%, Independents 7.5%, "teal independents" 0.5%, Other parties 2%)	—N/a	47%	53%
23 September 2022	Newspoll	35%*		40%	12%	—N/a	—N/a	13%	—N/a	46%	54%
18 September 2022	Resolve Strategic	30%*		43%	10%	2%	—N/a	15%	—N/a	—N/a	—N/a
12 September 2022	Essential	36.4%*		32%	8.5%	—N/a	—N/a	—N/a	13%	—N/a	—N/a
2 July 2022	Essential	37%*		33%	—N/a	—N/a	—N/a	—N/a	—N/a	—N/a	—N/a
20 February 2022	Resolve Strategic	37%*		34%	8%	2%	—N/a	19%	—N/a	—N/a	—N/a
25 November 2021	Resolve Strategic	41%*		31%	10%	2%	—N/a	16%	—N/a	—N/a	—N/a
5 October 2021 Dominic Perrottet succeeds Gladys Berejiklian as Liberal leader and Premier
23 September 2021	Resolve Strategic	41%*		30%	11%	2%	—N/a	16%	—N/a	—N/a	—N/a
18 July 2021	Resolve Strategic	43%*		28%	12%	1%	—N/a	16%	—N/a	—N/a	—N/a
4 June 2021 Chris Minns succeeds Jodi McKay as Labor leader and Leader of the Opposition
16 May 2021	Resolve Strategic	44%*		28%	12%	4%	—N/a	12%	—N/a	—N/a	—N/a
March 2021	Redbridge	37.0%	3.1%	23.9%	6.7%	0.8%	4.3%	5.3%	18.9%	59%	41%
29 June 2019 Jodi McKay succeeds Michael Daley becomes Labor leader and Leader of the Opposition
23 March 2019 election		32.0%	9.6%	33.3%	9.6%	3.5%	1.1%	11.0%	–	52.0%	48.0%
22 March 2019	Newspoll	41%*		35%	10%	—N/a	—N/a	14%	—N/a	51%	49% (Note: Preference allocation based on previous election.)
* Indicates a combined Liberal/National primary vote.
Newspoll polling is published in The Australian.

=== Preferred Premier and satisfaction ===
View source data.
View source data.
View source data.

==== Polling ====
Better Premier and satisfaction polling*
Date	Firm	Better Premier		Perrottet		Minns	
Date	Firm	Perrottet	Minns	Satisfied	Dissatisfied	Satisfied	Dissatisfied
24 March 2023	Newspoll	39%	41%	44%	47%	47%	33%
22 March 2023	Freshwater Strategy	46%	40%	not asked		not asked	
21 March 2023	Essential	36%	33%	not asked		not asked	
19 March 2023	Resolve Strategic	40%	34%	52%	32%	46%	26%
28 February 2023	Resolve Strategic	38%	34%	45%	40%	43%	28%
27 February 2023	Freshwater Strategy	46%	34%	not asked		not asked	
26 February 2023	Newspoll	43%	33%	50%	41%	41%	33%
21 February 2023	Essential	not asked		45%	42%	37%	26%
1–6 February 2023	SEC Newgate	34%	27%	not asked			not asked
7 February 2023	Essential	not asked		51%	33%	38%	25%
24 January 2023	Essential	not asked		47%	36%	38%	27%
22 January 2023	Resolve Strategic	33%	29%	not asked			not asked
16 November 2022	Private polling	not asked		39%	47%	42%	27%
30 October 2022	Resolve Strategic	30%	29%	not asked		not asked	
13–16 October 2022	Freshwater Strategy	38%	41%	37%	35%	26%	15%
23 September 2022	Newspoll	39%	35%	47%	41%	42%	27%
18 September 2022	Resolve Strategic	28%	28%	not asked		not asked	
2 July 2022	Essential	not asked		49%	35%	39%	22%
20 February 2022	Resolve Strategic	29%	32%	not asked		not asked	
25 November 2021	Resolve Strategic	34%	23%	not asked		not asked	
20–24 October 2021	Essential	not asked		47%	28%	not asked	
5 October 2021 Perrottet replaces Berejiklian as Premier		Berejiklian	Minns	Berejiklian		Minns	
23 September 2021	Resolve Strategic	48%	21%	not asked		not asked	
15–18 September 2021	Newspoll	not asked		56%	40%	not asked	
28 July 2021	Utting Research	not asked		56%	33%	not asked	
18 July 2021	Resolve Strategic	55%	16%	not asked		not asked	
4 June 2021 Minns replaces McKay as Opposition Leader		Berejiklian	McKay	Berejiklian		McKay	
16 May 2021	Resolve Strategic	57%	17%	50%	17%	13%	21%
11–16 November 2020	Essential	not asked		75%	17%	not asked	
28 October – 2 November 2020	Essential	not asked		68%	21%	not asked	
21–23 October 2020	Ipsos	58%	19%	64%	16%	22%	25%
14–19 October 2020	Essential	not asked		67%	22%	not asked	
16–17 October 2020	YouGov	not asked		68%	26%	not asked	
15–18 July 2020	Newspoll	not asked		64%	30%	not asked	
24–28 June 2020	Newspoll	not asked		68%	26%	not asked	
21–26 April 2020	Newspoll	not asked		69%	23%	not asked	
29 June 2019 McKay replaces Daley as Opposition Leader		Berejiklian	Daley	Berejiklian		Daley	
23 March 2019 election		–	–	–	–	–	–
22 March 2019	Newspoll	43%	35%	43%	42%	32%	49%
19 March 2019	YouGov–Galaxy	38%	36%	not asked			
10 March 2019	Newspoll	41%	34%	44%	38%	37%	38%
10 March 2019	UComms–ReachTEL	46.7%	53.3%	not asked			
* Remainder were "uncommitted" or "other/neither". † Participants were forced to choose.
Newspoll polling is published in The Australian.

=== Electoral district polling ===
Date	Firm	Electorate	Voting intention							2cp vote		
Date	Firm	Electorate	L/NP	ALP	GRN	ONP	SFF	IND	OTH	L/NP	ALP	IND
Mar 2023	Freshwater Strategy	Riverstone	—N/a	—N/a	—N/a	—N/a	—N/a	—N/a	—N/a	46%	54%	—N/a
Mar 2023	Climate 200	North Shore	—N/a	—N/a	—N/a	—N/a	—N/a	—N/a	—N/a	50.7%	—N/a	49.3%
27 Feb– 2 Mar 2023	Redbridge Group	Parramatta	—N/a	—N/a	—N/a	—N/a	—N/a	—N/a	—N/a	46%	54%	—N/a
27 Feb– 2 Mar 2023	Redbridge Group	Penrith	—N/a	—N/a	—N/a	—N/a	—N/a	—N/a	—N/a	51%	49%	—N/a
27 Feb 2023	Freshwater Strategy	Pittwater	41%	16%	4%	—N/a	—N/a	30%	9%	52%	—N/a	48%
Jan 2023	Internal polling	Holsworthy	—N/a	—N/a	—N/a	—N/a	—N/a	—N/a	—N/a	51%	49%	—N/a
Jan 2023	Internal polling	Londonderry	—N/a	—N/a	—N/a	—N/a	—N/a	—N/a	—N/a	49%	51%	—N/a
Jan 2023	Internal polling	Penrith	—N/a	—N/a	—N/a	—N/a	—N/a	—N/a	—N/a	50%	50%	—N/a
Jan 2023	Internal polling	Riverstone	—N/a	—N/a	—N/a	—N/a	—N/a	—N/a	—N/a	52%	48%	—N/a
Jan 2023	Internal polling	Winston Hills	—N/a	—N/a	—N/a	—N/a	—N/a	—N/a	—N/a	45%	55%	—N/a
Mar 2023	Sky News	Goulburn	35%	33%	9%	5%	13%	—N/a	—N/a	—N/a	—N/a	—N/a
Mar 2023	Sky News	Hornsby	37%	21%	—N/a	15%	—N/a	—N/a	—N/a	58%	42%	—N/a
Mar 2023	Sky News	Leppington	32%	40%	7%	16%	—N/a	—N/a	—N/a	48%	52%	—N/a
Mar 2023	Sky News	North Shore	34%	10%	12%	—N/a	—N/a	—N/a	28%	46%	—N/a	54%
Mar 2023	Sky News	Penrith	—N/a	—N/a	—N/a	—N/a	—N/a	—N/a	—N/a	51%	49%	—N/a
Mar 2023	Sky News	Wakehurst	41%	11%	3%	—N/a	—N/a	—N/a	37%	50%	—N/a	50%
Mar 2023	Sky News	Winston Hills	—N/a	—N/a	—N/a	—N/a	—N/a	—N/a	—N/a	59%	41%	—N/a

== Newspaper endorsements ==
In the lead-up to elections, many newspapers publish editorial endorsements. The Coalition received support from several newspapers during the 2023 campaign which has been the case since the 2011 election. Nine Entertainment's Sydney Morning Herald endorsed the Coalition, stating that they believed the Coalition leader, Dominic Perrottet, should be given the opportunity to demonstrate his abilities to the people of NSW. The Daily Telegraph did not publish an editorial, but one of its columnists, Vikki Campion, warned that a Labor victory could result in "wasted money and efforts on feasibility studies, planning, and designs for safer roads and better dams." The Australian and The Australian Financial Review, both national mastheads, also endorsed the Coalition, with the latter citing their belief that the Coalition offered the best chance for getting "New South Wales through the national economic downturn and into a new phase of growth." Meanwhile, the Illawarra Mercury did not explicitly endorse a party but emphasised to readers that "there's a very real chance of a change of government on Saturday, and you might want to play your part."

Newspaper	City	Owner	Endorsement
Illawarra Mercury	Wollongong	Australian Community Media	Change of government
The Australian	Sydney	News Corp	Coalition
The Australian Financial Review	Sydney	Nine Entertainment	Coalition
The Sydney Morning Herald	Sydney	Nine Entertainment	Coalition

== See also ==
- Candidates of the 2023 New South Wales state election
