= Amanda Cohn =

Australian politician

Amanda Cohn MLC
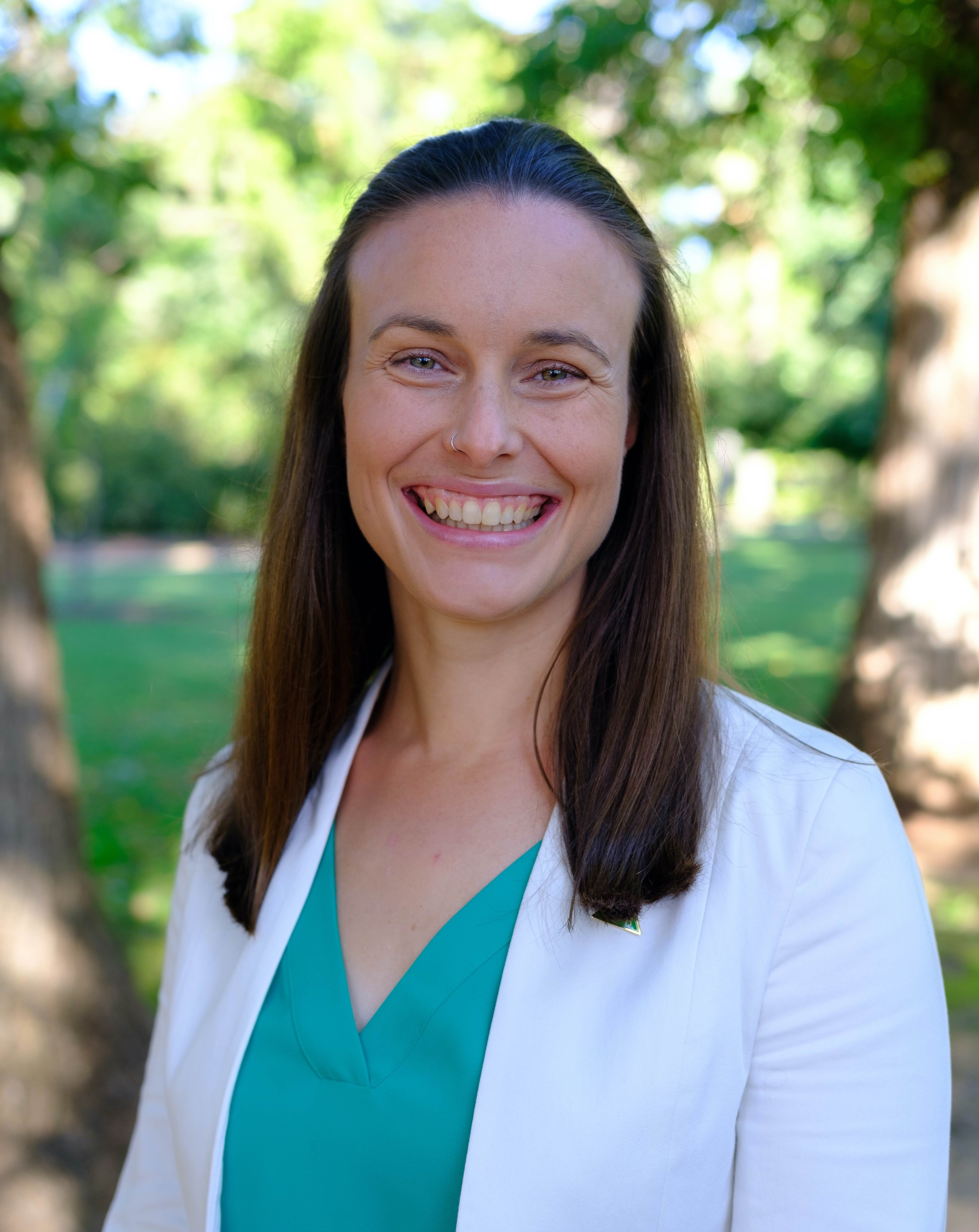

Member of the New South Wales Legislative Council
- Incumbent
- Assumed office 25 March 2023
- Preceded by: Justin Field

Deputy Mayor of Albury
- In office 10 September 2016 – 22 November 2021
- Preceded by: David Thurley
- Succeeded by: Steve Bowen

Councillor on Albury City Council
- In office 19 September 2016 – 2021
- Succeeded by: Ashley Edwards

Personal details
- Born: 5 December 1989 (age 36) Sydney
- Party: The Greens NSW
- Spouse: Geoffrey Hudson
- Education: University of New South Wales
- Occupation: Politician, general practitioner

Amanda Cohn (born 5 December 1989) is an Australian politician and former rural general practitioner (GP). She was elected to the New South Wales Legislative Council on 25 March 2023 as a member of The Greens NSW. Prior to entering state politics, she was a Councillor and Deputy Mayor at Albury City Council.

== Career ==
Prior to entering Parliament, Cohn was a GP and frontline emergency services volunteer.

As a GP, Cohn was a provider of medical abortion, gender-affirming care and health assessments for newly arrived refugees. She was an active campaigner for abortion decriminalisation in New South Wales, and published research on various medical topics.

== Political career ==
Cohn was first nominated as the Greens candidate for the division of Farrer in the House of Representatives at the 2016 federal election. In 2016, Cohn was elected to Albury City Council, making history as both the youngest female and first Greens candidate to be elected to the council. Subsequently, she was appointed Deputy Mayor by the council, and after one term retired from local government in 2021. In 2022, she was a candidate for the Senate at the 2022 federal election, on a ticket which elected David Shoebridge.

Cohn was elected to the New South Wales Legislative Council on the Greens ticket at the 2023 New South Wales state election after campaigning on rural and regional healthcare reform, abortion services, and LGBTQIA+ rights. She is currently responsible for the portfolios of Health (including Mental Health), LGBTQIA+, Youth, Local Government, Emergency Services, Air Quality, Waste, Sport & Recreation, Central West NSW, Western NSW, and the Riverina Murray region.

== Personal life ==
Cohn is a runner, cyclist, and bushwalker, and lives in Albury-Wodonga. In 2022, Cohn completed an Ironman distance triathlon.

In her opening speech to parliament, she identified that her paternal grandparents were Jewish German refugees who fled the holocaust.

Cohn is openly bisexual and lives with her partner Geoff in Albury.
