= Post-election pendulum for the 2023 New South Wales state election =

The following is the post-election pendulum for the 2023 New South Wales state election. It is based on notional margins calculated by psephologist Kevin Bonham.

== Post-election pendulum ==
This is the post-election pendulum, based on the results of the election.

Labor seats (45)
Seat	Member	Party	Margin
Marginal
Penrith	Karen McKeown	ALP	1.6%
East Hills	Kylie Wilkinson	ALP	1.7%
Monaro	Steve Whan	ALP	2.3% v NAT
Camden	Sally Quinell	ALP	3.0%
Riverstone	Warren Kirby	ALP	3.7%
South Coast	Liza Butler	ALP	3.8%
Fairly safe
The Entrance	David Mehan	ALP	7.8%
Liverpool	Charishma Kaliyanda	ALP	8.4%
Parramatta	Donna Davis	ALP	8.6%
Prospect	Hugh McDermott	ALP	8.7%
Leppington	Nathan Hagarty	ALP	8.9%
Heathcote	Maryanne Stuart	ALP	9.9%
Safe
Bega	Michael Holland	ALP	10.4%
Cabramatta	Tri Vo	ALP	11.8%
Coogee	Marjorie O'Neill	ALP	12.3%
Strathfield	Jason Yat-Sen Li	ALP	13.1%
Londonderry	Prue Car	ALP	13.7%
Lismore	Janelle Saffin	ALP	15.0% v NAT
Rockdale	Steve Kamper	ALP	15.4%
Gosford	Liesl Tesch	ALP	15.4%
Swansea	Yasmin Catley	ALP	15.4%
Summer Hill	Jo Haylen	ALP	16.3% v GRN
Shellharbour	Anna Watson	ALP	17.1% v IND
Very Safe
Kogarah	Chris Minns	ALP	18.3%
Maitland	Jenny Aitchison	ALP	18.6%
Maroubra	Michael Daley	ALP	18.7%
Port Stephens	Kate Washington	ALP	19.0%
Blacktown	Stephen Bali	ALP	19.1%
Wyong	David Harris	ALP	19.8%
Macquarie Fields	Anoulack Chanthivong	ALP	19.9%
Bankstown	Jihad Dib	ALP	20.3%
Fairfield	David Saliba	ALP	20.9%
Charlestown	Jodie Harrison	ALP	21.1%
Granville	Julia Finn	ALP	21.5%
Blue Mountains	Trish Doyle	ALP	21.9%
Mount Druitt	Edmond Atalla	ALP	22.4%
Newcastle	Tim Crakanthorp	ALP	22.6%
Campbelltown	Greg Warren	ALP	23.3%
Heffron	Ron Hoenig	ALP	23.3%
Cessnock	Clayton Barr	ALP	23.4% v ONP
Auburn	Lynda Voltz	ALP	24.0%
Keira	Ryan Park	ALP	24.2%
Wollongong	Paul Scully	ALP	24.3%
Canterbury	Sophie Cotsis	ALP	25.8%
Wallsend	Sonia Hornery	ALP	31.8%

Liberal/National seats (36)
Seat	Member	Party	Margin
Marginal
Ryde	Jordan Lane	LIB	0.1% (Note: Jordan Lane won the seat by just 54 votes in the two-party-preferred contest against Labor candidate Lyndal Howison. Labor saw an 8.9% swing towards them on two-party-preferences, which was the exact margin that the Liberals won Ryde with in 2019 with Victor Dominello.)
Holsworthy	Tina Ayyad	LIB	0.4%
Pittwater	Rory Amon	LIB	0.7% v IND
Oatley	Mark Coure	LIB	0.8%
Terrigal	Adam Crouch	LIB	1.2%
Goulburn	Wendy Tuckerman	LIB	1.3%
Drummoyne	Stephanie Di Pasqua	LIB	1.3%
Winston Hills	Mark Taylor	LIB	1.8%
Miranda	Eleni Petinos	LIB	2.3%
Willoughby	Tim James	LIB	2.6% v IND
Tweed	Geoff Provest	NAT	3.6%
Upper Hunter	Dave Layzell	NAT	3.8%
Epping	Dominic Perrottet	LIB	4.8%
Manly	James Griffin	LIB	4.8% v IND
Lane Cove	Anthony Roberts	LIB	5.5%
North Shore	Felicity Wilson	LIB	5.7% v IND
Fairly safe
Hornsby	Matt Kean	LIB	8.0%
Hawkesbury	Robyn Preston	LIB	9.8%
Safe
Badgerys Creek	Tanya Davies	LIB	10.5%
Wahroonga	Alister Henskens	LIB	10.6%
Port Macquarie	Leslie Williams	LIB	10.8% v NAT (Note: At this election, two Coalition candidates contested the seat of Port Macquarie, both of which made the two-party-preferred contest. The Liberal vs Labor margin is 16.7%.)
Castle Hill	Mark Hodges	LIB	10.9%
Kellyville	Ray Williams	LIB	11.0%
Oxley	Michael Kemp	NAT	12.8%
Vaucluse	Kellie Sloane	LIB	12.9% v IND
Coffs Harbour	Gurmesh Singh	NAT	13.2%
Cronulla	Mark Speakman	LIB	13.8%
Davidson	Matt Cross	LIB	13.9%
Clarence	Richie Williamson	NAT	14.3%
Tamworth	Kevin Anderson	NAT	15.8% v IND
Myall Lakes	Tanya Thompson	NAT	15.8%
Albury	Justin Clancy	LIB	16.3%
Very safe
Dubbo	Dugald Saunders	NAT	18.6%
Bathurst	Paul Toole	NAT	23.6%
Cootamundra	Steph Cooke	NAT	32.1%
Northern Tablelands	Adam Marshall	NAT	33.8%

Crossbench seats (12)
Seat	Member	Party	Margin
Marginal
Kiama	Gareth Ward	IND	0.8% v ALP
Wollondilly	Judy Hannan	IND	1.5% v LIB
Balmain	Kobi Shetty	GRN	1.8% v ALP
Wakehurst	Michael Regan	IND	4.5% v LIB
Fairly safe
Ballina	Tamara Smith	GRN	7.7% v NAT
Safe
Newtown	Jenny Leong	GRN	12.1% v ALP
Sydney	Alex Greenwich	IND	15.6% v ALP
Barwon	Roy Butler	IND	16.0% v NAT
Murray	Helen Dalton	IND	16.0% v NAT
Very safe
Orange	Philip Donato	IND	21.9% v NAT
Wagga Wagga	Joe McGirr	IND	22.4% v NAT
Lake Macquarie	Greg Piper	IND	24.1% v ALP
