= Pre-election pendulum for the 2023 New South Wales state election =

The following is the pre-election pendulum for the 2023 New South Wales state election. It is based on notional margins calculated by the ABC's Antony Green. Members in italics did not contest the election as a candidate for the seat they currently held or its replacement. However, the incumbent member for Holsworthy Melanie Gibbons contested the seat of Kiama. By-elections were held in some seats during this term of Parliament that changed their margins. See the footnotes for details.

Liberal/National seats (46)
Marginal
| East Hills | Wendy Lindsay | LIB | 0.1% |
| Upper Hunter | Dave Layzell (Note: Dave Layzell was elected to the district of Upper Hunter in the 2021 by-election after the resignation of Michael Johnsen.) | NAT | 0.5% (Note: While the redistributed margin based on 2019 results is National 0.5%, the result of the 2021 by-election is a margin of 5.8% for The Nationals.) |
| Penrith | Stuart Ayres | LIB | 0.6% |
| Goulburn | Wendy Tuckerman | LIB | 3.1% |
| Tweed | Geoff Provest | NAT | 5.0% |
| Winston Hills | Mark Taylor | LIB | 5.7% |
Fairly safe
| Holsworthy | Melanie Gibbons (Note: Melanie Gibbons will contest the seat of Kiama.) | LIB | 6.0% |
| Wollondilly | Nathaniel Smith | LIB | 6.0% v IND (Note: The alternative two-party-preferred margin after redistribution is LIB 14.2% v ALP.) |
| Riverstone | Kevin Conolly | LIB | 6.2% |
| Parramatta | Geoff Lee | LIB | 6.5% |
| Oatley | Mark Coure | LIB | 6.8% |
| Camden | Peter Sidgreaves | LIB | 7.3% |
| Ryde | Victor Dominello | LIB | 8.9% |
| Myall Lakes | Stephen Bromhead | NAT | 9.3% |
| Badgerys Creek | Tanya Davies | LIB | 9.7% |
Safe
| South Coast | Shelley Hancock | LIB | 10.6% |
| Coffs Harbour | Gurmesh Singh | NAT | 10.8% |
| North Shore | Felicity Wilson | LIB | 11.1% v IND (Note: The alternative two-party-preferred margin based on 2019 results is LIB 17.8% v ALP.) |
| Epping | Dominic Perrottet | LIB | 11.3% |
| Monaro | Nichole Overall (Note: Nichole Overall was elected to the district of Monaro in the 2022 by-election after the resignation of John Barilaro.) | NAT | 11.6% (Note: While the margin based on 2019 results is 11.6%, with Monaro's boundaries unchanged by the redistribution, the result of the 2022 by-election is a margin of 5.2% for the Nationals.) |
| Kiama | Gareth Ward (IND) | LIB | 12.0% |
| Terrigal | Adam Crouch | LIB | 12.3% |
| Drummoyne | John Sidoti (IND) | LIB | 13.6% |
| Miranda | Eleni Petinos | LIB | 14.4% |
| Clarence | Chris Gulaptis | NAT | 14.5% |
| Manly | James Griffin | LIB | 14.6% |
| Lane Cove | Anthony Roberts | LIB | 14.7% |
| Oxley | Melinda Pavey | NAT | 15.4% |
| Albury | Justin Clancy | LIB | 15.9% |
| Hawkesbury | Robyn Preston | LIB | 16.6% |
| Hornsby | Matt Kean | LIB | 16.9% |
| Bathurst | Paul Toole | NAT | 17.9% |
Very safe
| Dubbo | Dugald Saunders | NAT | 18.1% |
| Wahroonga | Alister Henskens | LIB | 19.0% |
| Cronulla | Mark Speakman | LIB | 19.6% |
| Port Macquarie | Leslie Williams (LIB) | NAT | 20.1% |
| Vaucluse | Gabrielle Upton | LIB | 20.6% |
| Willoughby | Tim James (Note: Tim James was elected to the district of Willoughby in the 2022 by-election after the resignation of Gladys Berejiklian.) | LIB | 20.7% (Note: While the redistributed two-party-preferred margin based on 2019 results would be Liberal 20.7%, the result of the 2022 by-election conducted in the old boundaries was a margin of 3.3% for the Liberals versus independent Larissa Penn.) |
| Wakehurst | Brad Hazzard | LIB | 21.9% |
| Pittwater | Rob Stokes | LIB | 22.4% |
| Castle Hill | David Elliott (Note: The new Castle Hill largely replaces Elliott's seat of Baulkham Hills. A new seat named Kellyville has been created to replace the seat that formerly held the name of Castle Hill.) | LIB | 22.4% |
| Kellyville | Ray Williams (Note: Kellyville largely replaces Williams's seat of Castle Hill. A different seat named Castle Hill has been created to replace Baulkham Hills.) | LIB | 23.1% |
| Davidson | Jonathan O'Dea | LIB | 24.8% |
| Cootamundra | Steph Cooke | NAT | 26.6% |
| Tamworth | Kevin Anderson | NAT | 28.0% |
| Northern Tablelands | Adam Marshall | NAT | 33.2% |

Labor seats (38)
Marginal
| Kogarah | Chris Minns | ALP | 0.1% |
| Leppington | new seat | ALP | 1.5% |
| Heathcote | Lee Evans (LIB) | ALP | 1.7% |
| Lismore | Janelle Saffin | ALP | 2.0% |
| Coogee | Marjorie O'Neill | ALP | 2.3% |
| Londonderry | Prue Car | ALP | 3.0% |
| Bega | Michael Holland (Note: Michael Holland was elected to the district of Bega in the February 2022 by-election after the resignation of Andrew Constance.) | ALP | 5.1% (Note: The margin used in the pendulum is Labor’s winning margin from the February 2022 by-election, which the Labor Party won with a margin of 5.1%. The margin based on 2019 election results is Liberal 6.9%. Bega's boundaries were unchanged by the redistribution.) |
| Strathfield | Jason Yat-Sen Li (Note: Jason Yat-Sen Li was elected to the district of Strathfield in the 2022 by-election after the resignation of Jodi McKay.) | ALP | 5.2% (Note: While the redistributed margin based on 2019 results is Labor 5.2%, the result of the 2022 by-election is a margin of 5.8% for the Labor Party.) |
| The Entrance | David Mehan | ALP | 5.3% |
| Port Stephens | Kate Washington | ALP | 5.8% |
Fairly safe
| Gosford | Liesl Tesch | ALP | 7.1% |
| Maroubra | Michael Daley | ALP | 8.3% |
| Prospect | Hugh McDermott | ALP | 8.6% |
| Granville | Julia Finn | ALP | 9.4% |
Safe
| Rockdale | Steve Kamper | ALP | 10.0% |
| Swansea | Yasmin Catley | ALP | 10.6% |
| Wyong | David Harris | ALP | 12.9% |
| Charlestown | Jodie Harrison | ALP | 13.1% |
| Blue Mountains | Trish Doyle | ALP | 13.6% |
| Auburn | Lynda Voltz | ALP | 13.7% |
| Maitland | Jenny Aitchison | ALP | 14.7% |
| Macquarie Fields | Anoulack Chanthivong | ALP | 14.9% |
| Canterbury | Sophie Cotsis | ALP | 15.3% |
| Heffron | Ron Hoenig | ALP | 15.3% |
| Campbelltown | Greg Warren | ALP | 16.0% |
| Blacktown | Stephen Bali | ALP | 16.7% |
| Fairfield | Guy Zangari | ALP | 16.8% |
| Liverpool | Paul Lynch | ALP | 17.4% |
| Newcastle | Tim Crakanthorp | ALP | 17.5% |
Very safe
| Keira | Ryan Park | ALP | 18.2% |
| Shellharbour | Anna Watson | ALP | 18.4% |
| Mount Druitt | Edmond Atalla | ALP | 18.5% |
| Cabramatta | Nick Lalich | ALP | 19.3% |
| Cessnock | Clayton Barr | ALP | 19.7% |
| Bankstown | Jihad Dib (Note: Bankstown largely replaces Dib's seat of Lakemba. The seat that formerly held the name of Bankstown was abolished.) | ALP | 20.5% |
| Summer Hill | Jo Haylen | ALP | 21.6% |
| Wollongong | Paul Scully | ALP | 22.9% |
| Wallsend | Sonia Hornery | ALP | 25.8% |
Crossbench seats (9)
Marginal
| Murray | Helen Dalton (IND) | SFF | 2.8% v NAT |
| Ballina | Tamara Smith | GRN | 4.9% v NAT |
Fairly safe
| Barwon | Roy Butler (IND) | SFF | 6.6% v NAT |
Safe
| Balmain | Jamie Parker | GRN | 10.0% v ALP |
| Newtown | Jenny Leong | GRN | 11.4% v ALP |
| Sydney | Alex Greenwich | IND | 11.8% v LIB |
| Orange | Philip Donato (IND) | SFF | 15.2% v NAT |
| Wagga Wagga | Joe McGirr | IND | 15.5% v NAT |
Very safe
| Lake Macquarie | Greg Piper | IND | 23.2% v ALP |
