= John Kaye (politician) =

Australian politician (1955–2016)

Dr John Kaye
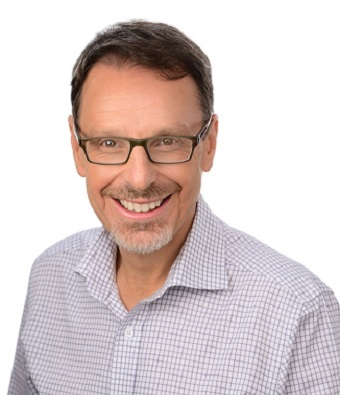
- John Kaye

Member of the New South Wales Legislative Council
- In office 24 March 2007 – 2 May 2016
- Succeeded by: Justin Field

Personal details
- Born: 23 October 1955 Melbourne, Victoria, Australia
- Died: 2 May 2016 (aged 60) Sydney, New South Wales, Australia
- Party: Greens New South Wales
- Website: johnkaye.org.au

John Kaye (23 October 1955 – 2 May 2016) was an Australian politician. He was a Greens member of the New South Wales Legislative Council, first elected at the 2007 state election. He was also the party's candidate for the 2004 federal election for the Senate. He criticised electricity industry privatisation and was a strong advocate for renewable energy and energy efficiency. He advocated for free public education, public schools, and Colleges of Technical and Further Education (TAFE).

== Early life and education ==
John Kaye was born on 23 October 1955.

He graduated first with a Bachelor of Engineering and then a Master's in Engineering Science at the University of Melbourne.

He earned a PhD from the University of California, Berkeley.

== Career ==
=== Engineering and academia ===
After graduating with his Master's, Kaye worked as an engineer for the State Electricity Commission of Victoria.

After earning his PhD, he was a postdoctoral fellow at the Australian National University for some time. He was later an academic in electrical engineering at the University of New South Wales, where he specialised in sustainable energy and greenhouse issues.

=== Politics ===
After leaving the Labor Party in the late 1980s, Kaye worked for independent community candidates and promoted what he saw as "sensible urban planning, genuine community consultation and participatory democracy." He joined the Australian Greens in 1997.

From 1998 to 2001, Kaye was the Greens policy coordinator and, from 1999 to 2002, was policy advisor to Greens MLC Lee Rhiannon, leading campaigns for public education; sustainable transport; the urban, rural, and natural environments; workers' rights; and developer donations to political parties. In the 2003 state election, he acted as the Greens campaign coordinator and policy coordinator.

In the 2004 federal election Kaye was the Greens' lead candidate for the Australian Senate from New South Wales. As lead candidate, the Greens vote increased to 7.3% but, due to unfavourable preference flows towards him, he failed to gain a seat by a margin of 0.5%.

At the 2007 state election he was elected as the second candidate on a Greens ticket headed by Lee Rhiannon.

Kaye's portfolio responsibilities included Premier & Cabinet, Treasury, Finance, Education and Training, Energy, Health Services, Science & Medical Research, Water Utilities, Fair Trading, Gaming and Racing, Infrastructure, and Commerce.

== Death and legacy ==
In February 2016, Kaye was diagnosed with cancer. He had been undergoing treatment, but died on 2 May 2016, aged 60.

When David Shoebridge was elected leader of the Greens on 30 September 2026, he paid tribute to Kaye, who had been his mentor during his first few years in the New South Wales Parliament, and, Shoebridge said, had taught him to do "politics with principle".
