= Danny Lim (activist) =

Australian activist and former politician

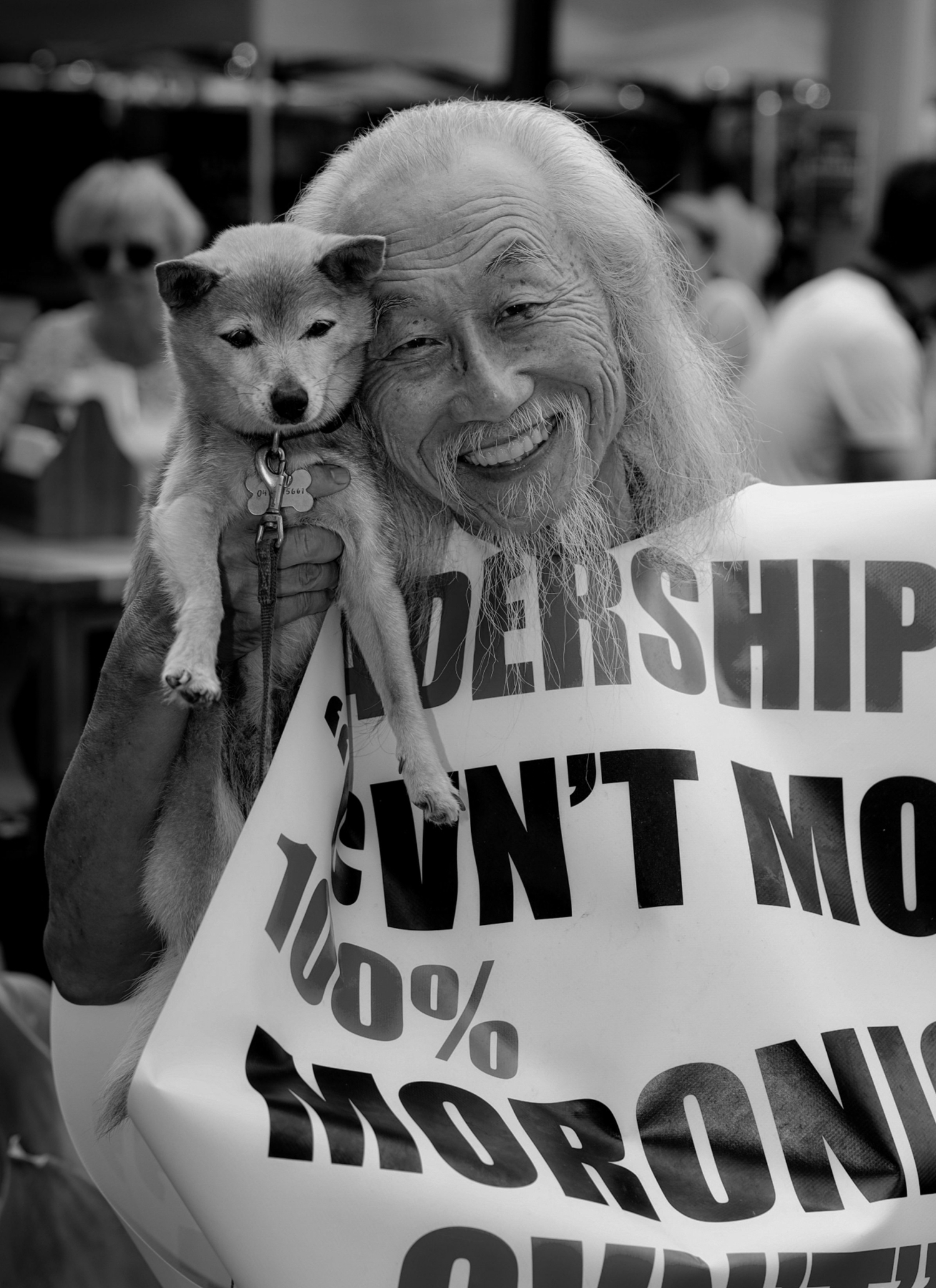

Councillor of the Municipality of Strathfield
- In office 13 September 2008 – 8 September 2012

Personal details
- Born: 1944 (age 81–82) Japanese Malaya
- Party: Independent
- Occupation: Former councillor and electrician

Danny Lim (born 1944) is an Australian activist and former politician. He is known for wearing political protest signs on a sandwich board.

== Early life ==
In 1963 Lim moved from Malaysia to Australia, where he began work as an electrical technician.

== Political career ==
=== Local government (2008–2012) ===
In 2008, Lim was elected to Strathfield Council as the lead candidate for an independent ticket, which received 13% of the vote. Lim ran on the policy of "openness, transparency, accountability and morality" in the council, and refused to get paid for his time in office.

=== State and Federal campaigns ===
During the 2016 federal election, Lim ran for the Australian Senate and received 0.01% of the vote in New South Wales. He also ran as an independent for the Legislative Council in the 2019 New South Wales election, gaining 644 votes (0.01%).

=== Film and music ===
Lim was a background actor in the movie Three Thousand Years of Longing. He played a storyteller, with his dog Smarty, attempting to squash the bloodlust of a tyrannical ruler.

Lim's infamous court case over the use of an offensive word on one of his signs was featured in the award-winning short documentary You Can You Cvn't.

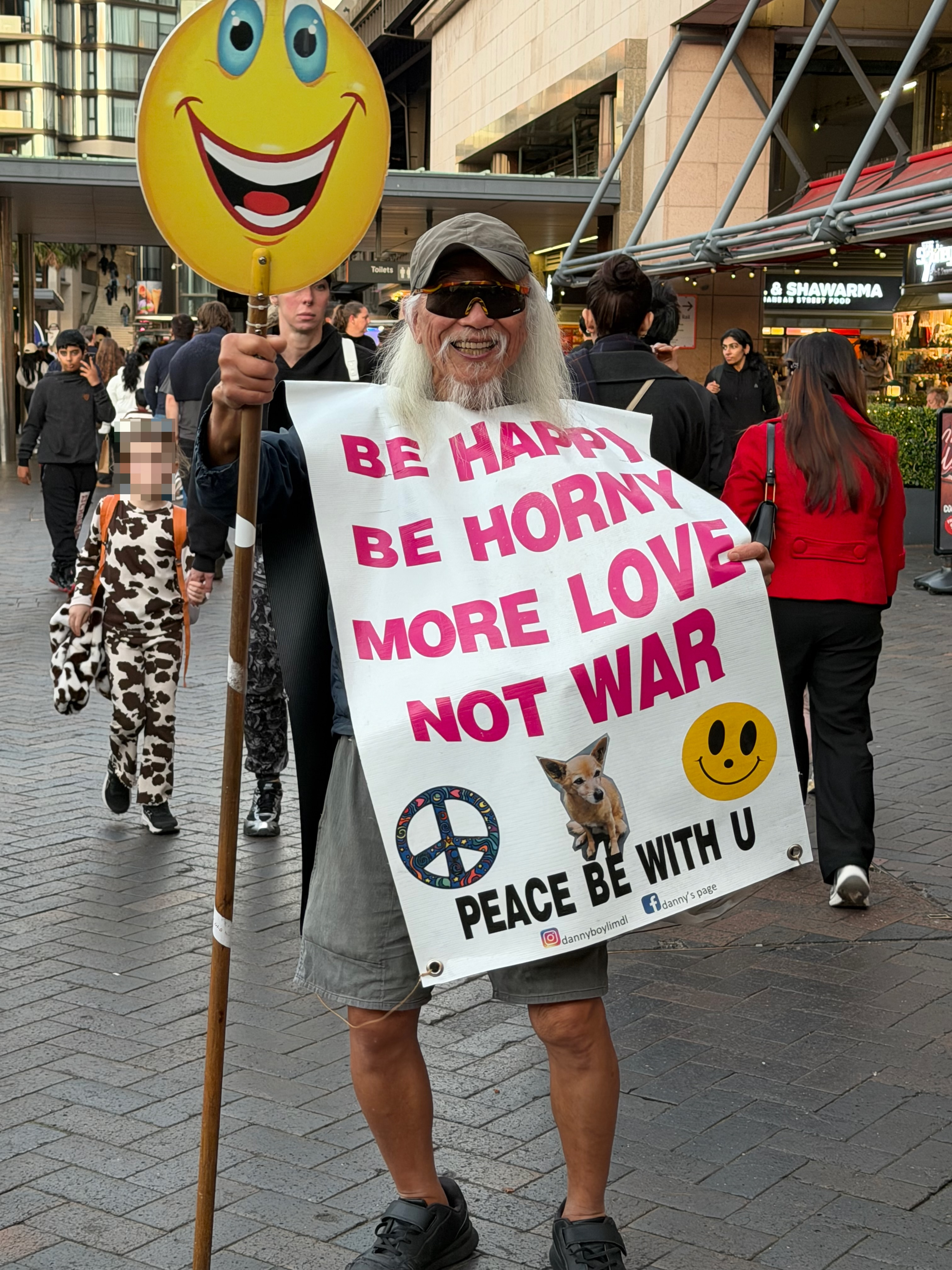
Danny Lim, Circular Quay, Sydney, 6 June 2026

Lim features on the album cover of Sticky Fingers Lekkerboy album.

Lim was featured in a cameo in season two of the 2022 series of Australian teen drama Heartbreak High. Lim also had a cameo in the 2024 film Furiosa: A Mad Max Saga and attended the premiere in Sydney.

== Legal issues ==
=== Offensive language court case ===
In 2015, Lim was fined $500 for offensive conduct after publicly wearing a sign which labelled the prime minister of Australia Tony Abbott a "C∀nt". A GoFundMe campaign by supporters raised enough money to cover the fine within less than an hour. However, Lim appealed and was acquitted, that court ruling that the word 'cunt' is not always offensive when said in public, compared to countries like the United States, and that a conviction would have restricted his freedom of political communication implicit in the Constitution. The case was seen by law academic Luke McNamara as a step towards protecting civil liberties.

=== Arrest at Barangaroo ===
Lim was arrested for offensive behaviour at Barangaroo in January 2019. This was due to a sign that included the word 'C∀nt', which a court had previously ruled to be legal. Lim commenced legal action against the charge as well as against the police officers who had arrested him. A rally to protest the arrest was reportedly attended by about 300 people. A magistrate dismissed the case on 30 August 2019.

=== Incident at the Queen Victoria Building, Sydney ===
On 22 November 2022, he sustained injuries during an arrest in the Queen Victoria Building, leaving him hospitalised. This arrest was later discontinued. On 24 November 2022, he was released from St Vincent's Hospital with "a plan in place for ongoing monitoring" after suffering bleeding on the brain.

=== Altercation with security guard, April 2023 ===
Lim was taken to hospital in April 2023 after an altercation with a security guard at Barangaroo.

=== Assaulted during Indigenous Voice referendum, September 2023 ===
On 22 September 2023, Lim was assaulted at Strathfield train station in Sydney by a 66-year-old man while advocating for a "Yes" vote in the Australian Indigenous Voice referendum. He was treated and taken to the Concord Repatriation General Hospital, where he received a CAT scan and was later reported to have an eye bleed injury.
