= Lou Amato =

Australian politician (born 1963)

NSW Parliamentary Secretary for Small Business
- In office 22 December 2021 – 3 March 2023
- Minister: Eleni Petinos (2021–2022); Victor Dominello (2022–2023)

Member of the New South Wales Legislative Council
- In office 28 March 2015 – 3 March 2023

Personal details
- Born: 1963 (age 62–63) Sydney, Australia
- Party: Liberal Party

Louis "Lou" Amato (pronounced [aˈmaːto]; born 1963) is an Australian politician. He was a Liberal member of the New South Wales Legislative Council from 2015 state election until the 2023 state election.

Immediately prior to his election to the NSW Parliament, he served as a Councillor and Deputy Mayor of the Wollondilly Shire Council. He was previously a motor mechanic.

Amato's preselection for the 2015 election was backed by powerbroker and state minister Jai Rowell, to replace the retiring Charlie Lynn. Lynn had supported Fairfield councillor Dai Le to replace him, which also had the support of state premier and party leader Mike Baird. However, Le was "persuaded" by Rowell not to run for preselection, and Amato was the only candidate in the pre-selection.
