= Natasha Maclaren-Jones =

Australian politician

The Honourable Natasha Maclaren-Jones MLC

Member of the New South Wales Legislative Council
- Incumbent
- Assumed office 20 April 2023
- In office 26 March 2011 – 6 March 2023
- Succeeded by: Scott Farlow

Minister for Families and Communities
- In office 21 December 2021 – 28 March 2023
- Preceded by: Alister Henskens
- Succeeded by: Kate Washington

Minister for Disability Services
- In office 21 December 2021 – 28 March 2023
- Preceded by: Alister Henskens
- Succeeded by: Kate Washington

Personal details
- Born: 11 March 1976 (age 50) Sydney, Australia
- Party: Liberal Party
- Spouse: Damien Jones
- Education: SCECGS Redlands
- Alma mater: University of Sydney; University of Technology, Sydney
- Profession: Nurse

Natasha Marianne Maclaren-Jones (born 11 March 1976) is an Australian politician, and is a Liberal Party member of the New South Wales Legislative Council since March 2011. Maclaren-Jones has served as the Minister for Families and Communities and the Minister for Disability Services from December 2021 until March 2023.

== Career ==
Before Parliament, Maclaren-Jones was a senior advisor to Helen Coonan and Bronwyn Bishop and was the state Liberal Party President that presided over the largest Coalition win in NSW political history in the 2011 state election.

Maclaren-Jones was nominated as the Liberal candidate for the President of the New South Wales Legislative Council in March 2021 after the resignation of John Ajaka. The Labor Opposition nominated Peter Primrose. Maclaren-Jones received 20 votes and Primrose 14, with eight informal votes. The clerk ruled that a majority of the 42 available votes was required for election, although the Liberal Party presented advice from the Crown Solicitor that a plurality of the votes was sufficient and congratulated Maclaren-Jones on her election. As the dispute over the presidency continued, Maclaren-Jones assumed the chair without being declared elected by the clerk on the night of 4 May 2021, before losing a vote of no confidence less than 90 minutes later. On the subsequent ballot to elect a new president, fellow Liberal Matthew Mason-Cox nominated for the role and won the election with 23 votes to Maclaren-Jones's 18 with the support of the opposition and the crossbench.

On 27 May 2021, Maclaren-Jones was appointed as Cabinet Secretary. In December 2021, she was appointed to the cabinet as Minister for Families and Communities and as Minister for Disability Services in the Perrottet ministry.

In December 2022, it was announced that Maclaren-Jones would resign mid-term and recontest the Legislative Council for a new 8-year term at the 2023 state election. On 6 March 2023, she resigned from the Legislative Council and resumed her seat on 20 April. She was subsequently appointed Shadow Minister for Families and Communities, Shadow Minister for Disability Inclusion, Shadow Minister for Homelessness and Shadow Minister for Youth in the Shadow ministry of Mark Speakman.

Political offices
Preceded by Alister Henskens as Minister for Families, Communities and Disability Services	Minister for Families and Communities; 2021–2023	Succeeded by Kate Washington
Preceded by Alister Henskens as Minister for Families, Communities and Disability Services	Minister for Disability Services; 2021–2023	Succeeded by Kate Washington
