= Public Education Party =

- Returning Officer: Glen Stelzer
- Founded: 2014; 12 years ago
- Preceded by: Voluntary Euthanasia Party; Reason NSW

Website
- https://www.publiceducationparty.org.au/

The Public Education Party is a minor political party in New South Wales. It was registered in early 2014 under the name Voluntary Euthanasia Party as the NSW branch of the federal party of the same name. It advocated for legislative change to allow voluntary euthanasia in New South Wales.

In 2019, the New South Wales branch voted to become the branch of the Reason Party. In late 2022, the NSW branch of Reason merged with the Fairer Education Party to become the Public Education Party.

== History ==
=== Voluntary Euthanasia Party (NSW) ===
Voluntary Euthanasia Party (NSW)
- Abbreviation: VEP
- Convenor: Shayne Higson
- Founders: Shayne Higson, Barry Shine
- Founded: 2014; 12 years ago
- Dissolved: December 2019
- Merged into: Reason Party
- Ideology: Single-issue politics

Website
- http://vep.org.au (defunct)

The party began its existence as the New South Wales branch of the Voluntary Euthanasia Party (VEP). The VEP was founded in 2013 to bring attention to the need for voluntary assisted dying law reform and to bring together advocates from the Dying with Dignity and Exit International movements. The immediate goal of the VEP was to make voluntary euthanasia a central issue at the September 2013 Federal election.

==== Federal ====
The New South Wales VEP nominated two candidates for the Senate at the 2013 Australian federal election and two candidates for the Senate at the 2016 Australian federal election. The VEP did not run any candidates in the 2019 Australian federal election, rather they focused on canvassing the views of major candidates in key electorates. The federal party voluntarily de-registered in March 2021.

==== State ====
The VEP stood sixteen candidates for the New South Wales Legislative Council in the 2015 New South Wales state election on 28 March 2015. The lead candidate was Shayne Higson. Higson began advocating for voluntary assisted dying legislation after her mother died from a brain tumour in 2012. The VEP received 40,710 votes (0.94% of votes).

The VEP stood sixteen candidates for the New South Wales Legislative Council in the 2019 New South Wales state election on 23 March 2019. Shayne Higson resumed her role as lead candidate. The VEP received 46,971 votes (1.06% of votes). Higson finished in 26th place out of 364 candidates; seats were awarded to those who finished in the top 21 places.

=== Reason Party (NSW) ===
Reason Party (NSW)
- Returning Officer: Shayne Higson
- Founded: 2019; 7 years ago
- Dissolved: December 2022
- Preceded by: Voluntary Euthanasia Party
- Succeeded by: Public Education Party
- Ideology: Civil libertarianism Progressivism; Secular liberalism Drug liberalisation
- Political position: Centre to centre-left
- Colours: Teal

Website
- reasonnsw.org.au/

In December 2019, the VEP's NSW branch voted overwhelmingly to become the NSW branch of the Reason Party, on the grounds that being a single issue political party was a liability, and the Reason party were established supporters of voluntary euthanasia. Reason party leader Fiona Patten also stated the merger made sense for Reason as they did not have a branch in NSW, where VEP was well established. In February 2022, Jane Caro announced that she was standing as a candidate for the party for a New South Wales Australian Senate seat in the 2022 Australian federal election. Caro was unsuccessful.

=== Public Education Party ===
In 2022, the NSW branch of Reason merged with the unregistered Fairer Education Party, going under the name of the Public Education Party. The party applied to change its name in December 2022. Shayne Higson initially remained as the Registered Officer but was eventually replaced in this role by Glen Stelzer, who stood as the party's candidate for Balmain in 2023.
