= Justin Field =

Australian politician

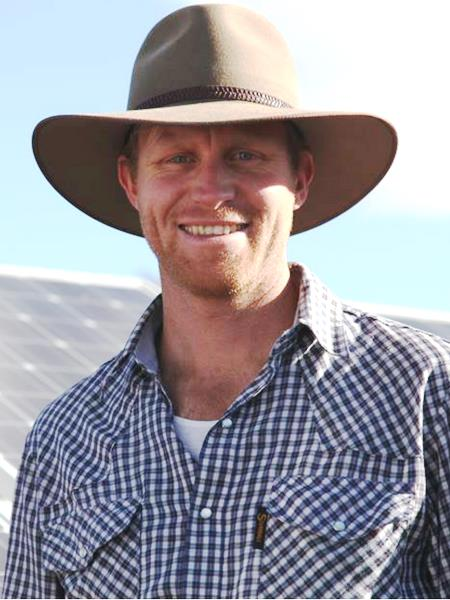

Member of the New South Wales Legislative Council
- In office 24 August 2016 – 3 March 2023
- Preceded by: John Kaye
- Succeeded by: Amanda Cohn

Personal details
- Party: Independent (2019–2023); Greens NSW (2016–2019)
- Spouse: Melissa Field
- Children: 1
- Education: Deakin University; Royal Military College, Duntroon
- Occupation: Politician; Army officer; Environmental campaigner; Policy adviser
- Military career
- Allegiance: Australia
- Branch: Australian Army
- Service years: 2000–2007
- Rank: Captain
- Unit: Australian Intelligence Corps

Justin Robert Field is an Australian environmental campaigner and former politician. He was a member of the New South Wales Legislative Council from 24 August 2016, when he filled a casual vacancy caused by the death of Greens MP John Kaye until 2023. Before entering parliament, Field campaigned for the Lock the Gate Alliance and the Nature Conservation Council, and formerly worked as a military intelligence officer. In April 2019, Field left the Greens to sit as an independent in the Legislative Council, citing problems with internal division and "hyper-partisanship" as reasons for quitting the party.
