= Scott Farlow =

Australian politician

The Honourable Scott Farlow MLC
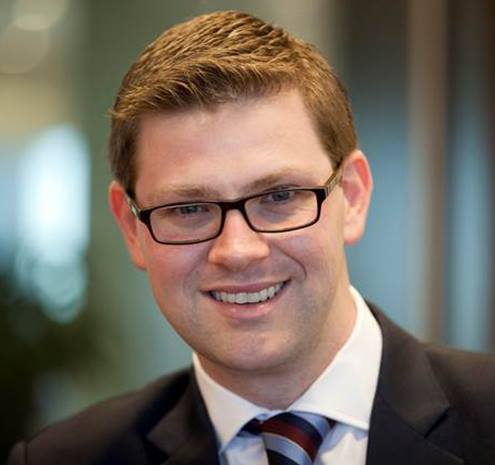

Member of the New South Wales Legislative Council
- Incumbent
- Assumed office 10 May 2023
- Preceded by: Natasha Maclaren-Jones
- In office 28 March 2015 – 3 March 2023

Government Whip in the Legislative Council
- In office 15 February 2022 – 28 March 2023
- Succeeded by: Mark Buttigieg

Parliamentary Secretary to the Treasurer
- In office 24 April 2019 – 20 December 2021
- Succeeded by: Felicity Wilson

Parliamentary Secretary to the Premier (Leader of the House) in the Legislative Council
- In office 1 February 2017 – 2 April 2019

Mayor of the Municipality of Strathfield
- In office 2007–2008
- Preceded by: Bill Carney
- Succeeded by: Paul Barron

Personal details
- Born: 20 October
- Party: Liberal Party
- Spouse: Penny George
- Children: 2
- Education: Sydney University

Scott Glynn Farlow is an Australian politician. He has been a Member of the New South Wales Legislative Council since the 2015 NSW state election, representing the Liberal Party.

Farlow previously served as Mayor of the Municipality of Strathfield, elected to the position at just 23 years of age.

Farlow is married to Penny George and together they have two children.

== Early life ==
Farlow grew up in Sydney's Inner Western suburbs. He was the first member of his family to study at university, graduating with degrees in Law and Commerce from the University of Sydney. He later graduated from the College of Law with a Diploma of Legal Practice.

Farlow got his start in politics by joining the Sydney University Liberal Club, becoming a member of the Liberal Party soon after. He became active in the Young Liberal Movement of NSW and in 2008 was elected president of the organisation, going on to become its longest-serving president.

In 2004, Farlow was elected to Strathfield City Council and became mayor in 2007. At the age of 23, Farlow was the youngest mayor in Australia at that time.

Farlow worked as an advisor to a number of federal and state MPs during his career.

Farlow has also worked as an analyst and lobbyist for firms such as Deloitte and Hill+Knowlton.

== Political career ==
Farlow was preselected by the Liberal Party to run as a candidate for the NSW Legislative Council at the March 2015 Election. He was subsequently elected and is serving an eight-year term set to expire in 2023.

In Farlow's inaugural speech to the NSW Parliament he highlighted increasing efficiency and transparency in government expenditure as one of his priority policy areas. He also spoke on the need to restore state rights in order to counter the issue of vertical fiscal imbalance and to restore competitive federalism.

Farlow has been appointed and chaired a number parliamentary committee's since entering the Upper House in 2015. In May 2015 he was appointed chair of the Legislative Council Standing Committee on Law and Justice. The same year Farlow was appointed a member of the Committee on the Ombudsman, the Police Integrity Commission and the Crime Commission. The following year Farlow was appointed to the Standing Committee on Social Issues, which he chaired whilst concurrently being a member of the General Purpose Standing Committee No. 6 as well as chairing the Standing Committee on Law and Justice. Farlow was appointed chair of the Regulation Committee as of December 2017.

In February 2017 Farlow was promoted to the position of Parliamentary Secretary to the Premier and Leader of the House in the Legislative Council; a position he held until April 2019. Following the 2019 New South Wales state election, in April 2019 Farlow was appointed as Parliamentary Secretary to the Treasurer, serving until 20 December 2021.

On 6 January 2026, Farlow was appointed Shadow Treasurer in the Sloane Shadow Ministry.
