= Electoral results for the district of Maitland =

Election results for Maitland, New South Wales, Australia

Maitland, an electoral district of the Legislative Assembly in the Australian state of New South Wales, was created in 1904 returning a single member. Between 1920 and 1927 it returned three member. It has returned a single member from 1927 to the present.

| Election | Member | Party | | | | |
|---|---|---|---|---|---|---|
| 1904 | John Gillies | Progressive | | | | |
| 1907 | John Gillies | Liberal Reform | | | | |
| 1910 | John Gillies | Independent Liberal | | | | |
| 1911 by | Charles Nicholson | Liberal Reform | | | | |
| 1913 | Charles Nicholson | Liberal Reform | | | | |
| 1917 | Charles Nicholson | Nationalist | Member | Party | Member | Party |
| 1920 | Walter O'Hearn | Labor | Walter Bennett | Progressive | William Cameron | Nationalist |
| 1922 | Walter O'Hearn | Labor | Walter Bennett | Nationalist | William Cameron | Nationalist |
| 1925 | Walter O'Hearn | Labor | Walter Bennett | Nationalist | William Cameron | Nationalist |
| 1927 | Walter O'Hearn | Labor | | | | |
| 1930 | Walter O'Hearn | Labor | | | | |
| 1932 | Walter Howarth | United Australia | | | | |
| 1935 | Walter Howarth | United Australia | | | | |
| 1938 | Walter Howarth | United Australia | | | | |
| 1941 | Walter Howarth | United Australia | | | | |
| 1944 | Walter Howarth | United Australia / Liberal | | | | |
| 1947 | Walter Howarth | Liberal | | | | |
| 1950 | Walter Howarth | Liberal | | | | |
| 1953 | Walter Howarth | Liberal | | | | |
| 1956 | Milton Morris | Liberal | | | | |
| 1959 | Milton Morris | Liberal | | | | |
| 1962 | Milton Morris | Liberal | | | | |
| 1965 | Milton Morris | Liberal | | | | |
| 1968 | Milton Morris | Liberal | | | | |
| 1971 | Milton Morris | Liberal | | | | |
| 1973 | Milton Morris | Liberal | | | | |
| 1975 | Milton Morris | Liberal | | | | |
| 1978 | Milton Morris | Liberal | | | | |
| 1981 by | Peter Toms | Liberal | | | | |
| 1981 | Allan Walsh | Labor | | | | |
| 1984 | Allan Walsh | Labor | | | | |
| 1984 | Allan Walsh | Labor | | | | |
| 1991 | Peter Blackmore | Liberal | | | | |
| 1995 | Peter Blackmore | Liberal | | | | |
| 1999 | John Price | Labor | | | | |
| 2003 | John Price | Labor | | | | |
| 2007 | Frank Terenzini | Labor | | | | |
| 2011 | Robyn Parker | Liberal | | | | |
| 2015 | Jenny Aitchison | Labor | | | | |
| 2019 | Jenny Aitchison | Labor | | | | |
| 2023 | Jenny Aitchison | Labor | | | | |

== Election results ==
=== Elections in the 2020s ===
==== 2023 ====
2023 New South Wales state election: Maitland
| Party | Candidate | Votes | % | ±% |
|---|---|---|---|---|
| Labor | Jenny Aitchison | 26,792 | 51.9 | +6.6 |
| Liberal | Michael Cooper | 11,745 | 22.7 | −2.6 |
| One Nation | Neil Turner | 4,404 | 8.5 | −2.7 |
| Greens | Campbell Knox | 3,725 | 7.2 | +1.1 |
| Legalise Cannabis | Daniel Dryden | 2,906 | 5.6 | +5.6 |
| Independent | Alex Lee | 1,200 | 2.3 | +2.3 |
| Sustainable Australia | Sam Ferguson | 861 | 1.7 | +0.1 |
| Total formal votes | | 51,633 | 96.5 | +0.5 |
| Informal votes | | 1,890 | 3.5 | −0.5 |
| Turnout | | 53,523 | 88.6 | −0.8 |
Two-party-preferred result
| Labor | Jenny Aitchison | 30,647 | 68.6 | +3.9 |
| Liberal | Michael Cooper | 14,012 | 31.4 | −3.9 |
| Labor hold | | Swing | +3.9 | |

=== Elections in the 2010s ===
==== 2019 ====
2019 New South Wales state election: Maitland
| Party | Candidate | Votes | % | ±% |
|---|---|---|---|---|
| Labor | Jenny Aitchison | 23,465 | 44.23 | +1.79 |
| Liberal | Sally Halliday | 14,137 | 26.65 | +1.82 |
| One Nation | Neil Turner | 5,785 | 10.90 | +10.90 |
| Greens | John Brown | 3,428 | 6.46 | +0.11 |
| Shooters, Fishers, Farmers | Nadrra Sarkis | 2,842 | 5.36 | +5.36 |
| Animal Justice | Amy Johnson | 1,454 | 2.74 | +2.74 |
| Keep Sydney Open | James Lawson | 1,108 | 2.09 | +2.09 |
| Sustainable Australia | Sam Ferguson | 831 | 1.57 | +1.57 |
| Total formal votes | | 53,050 | 96.11 | −0.47 |
| Informal votes | | 2,146 | 3.89 | +0.47 |
| Turnout | | 55,196 | 91.55 | −1.03 |
Two-party-preferred result
| Labor | Jenny Aitchison | 27,211 | 63.21 | −0.62 |
| Liberal | Sally Halliday | 15,835 | 36.79 | +0.62 |
| Labor hold | | Swing | −0.62 | |

==== 2015 ====
2015 New South Wales state election: Maitland
| Party | Candidate | Votes | % | ±% |
|---|---|---|---|---|
| Labor | Jenny Aitchison | 20,298 | 42.4 | +12.1 |
| Liberal | Steve Thomson | 11,877 | 24.8 | −14.7 |
| Independent | Philip Penfold | 11,124 | 23.3 | +23.3 |
| Greens | John Brown | 3,040 | 6.4 | −0.4 |
| Christian Democrats | Anna Balfour | 912 | 1.9 | −0.5 |
| No Land Tax | Tania Esposito | 577 | 1.2 | +1.2 |
| Total formal votes | | 47,828 | 96.6 | +0.2 |
| Informal votes | | 1,695 | 3.4 | −0.2 |
| Turnout | | 49,523 | 92.6 | +2.3 |
Two-party-preferred result
| Labor | Jenny Aitchison | 25,139 | 63.8 | +18.8 |
| Liberal | Steve Thomson | 14,246 | 36.2 | −18.8 |
| Labor gain from Liberal | | Swing | +18.8 | |

==== 2011 ====
2011 New South Wales state election: Maitland
| Party | Candidate | Votes | % | ±% |
|---|---|---|---|---|
| Liberal | Robyn Parker | 19,600 | 40.8 | +20.3 |
| Labor | Frank Terenzini | 14,160 | 29.5 | −10.2 |
| Hatton's Independent Team | Kellie Tranter | 9,890 | 20.6 | +12.4 |
| Greens | John Brown | 3,242 | 6.8 | +1.7 |
| Independent | Anna Balfour | 1,127 | 2.3 | +2.3 |
| Total formal votes | | 48,019 | 96.9 | −0.9 |
| Informal votes | | 1,535 | 3.1 | +0.9 |
| Turnout | | 49,554 | 94.5 | |
Two-party-preferred result
| Liberal | Robyn Parker | 22,057 | 56.3 | +16.0 |
| Labor | Frank Terenzini | 17,135 | 43.7 | −16.0 |
| Liberal gain from Labor | | Swing | +16.0 | |

=== Elections in the 2000s ===
==== 2007 ====
2007 New South Wales state election: Maitland
| Party | Candidate | Votes | % | ±% |
|---|---|---|---|---|
| Labor | Frank Terenzini | 17,823 | 39.7 | −9.2 |
| Independent | Peter Blackmore | 11,942 | 26.6 | +26.6 |
| Liberal | Bob Geoghegan | 9,218 | 20.5 | −11.4 |
| Independent | Kellie Tranter | 3,692 | 8.2 | +8.2 |
| Greens | Jan Davis | 2,262 | 5.0 | −0.5 |
| Total formal votes | | 44,937 | 97.8 | 0.0 |
| Informal votes | | 1,013 | 2.2 | 0.0 |
| Turnout | | 45,950 | 94.9 | |
Notional two-party-preferred count
| Labor | Frank Terenzini | 21,692 | 59.7 | −0.6 |
| Liberal | Bob Geoghegan | 14,628 | 40.3 | +0.6 |
Two-candidate-preferred result
| Labor | Frank Terenzini | 19,989 | 52.0 | −8.3 |
| Independent | Peter Blackmore | 18,463 | 48.0 | +48.0 |
| Labor hold | | Swing | −8.3 | |

==== 2003 ====
2003 New South Wales state election: Maitland
| Party | Candidate | Votes | % | ±% |
|---|---|---|---|---|
| Labor | John Price | 22,068 | 47.5 | +4.6 |
| Liberal | Bob Geoghegan | 15,382 | 33.1 | −7.9 |
| Independent | Ann Lawler | 3,405 | 7.3 | +6.5 |
| Greens | Aina Ranke | 2,595 | 5.6 | +2.6 |
| Independent | John Lee | 1,707 | 3.7 | +3.7 |
| One Nation | Christine Ferguson | 616 | 1.3 | −6.7 |
| Democrats | Sharon Davies | 455 | 1.0 | −0.8 |
| Unity | Loan Truong | 200 | 0.4 | +0.4 |
| Total formal votes | | 46,428 | 97.8 | −0.7 |
| Informal votes | | 1,025 | 2.2 | +0.7 |
| Turnout | | 47,453 | 95.1 | |
Two-party-preferred result
| Labor | John Price | 24,226 | 58.9 | +7.9 |
| Liberal | Bob Geoghegan | 16,891 | 41.1 | −7.9 |
| Labor hold | | Swing | +7.9 | |

=== Elections in the 1990s ===
==== 1999 ====
1999 New South Wales state election: Maitland
| Party | Candidate | Votes | % | ±% |
|---|---|---|---|---|
| Labor | John Price | 18,563 | 42.9 | −0.6 |
| Liberal | Peter Blackmore | 17,729 | 41.0 | −6.7 |
| One Nation | Phillip Harper | 3,452 | 8.0 | +8.0 |
| Greens | Jan Davis | 1,282 | 3.0 | −2.9 |
| Democrats | James Lantry | 766 | 1.8 | −1.2 |
| Christian Democrats | Paul Kerslake | 610 | 1.4 | +1.4 |
| Outdoor Recreation | Bob Taylor | 518 | 1.2 | +1.2 |
| Citizens Electoral Council | Ann Lawler | 359 | 0.8 | +0.8 |
| Total formal votes | | 43,279 | 98.6 | +2.3 |
| Informal votes | | 619 | 1.4 | −2.3 |
| Turnout | | 43,898 | 96.0 | |
Two-party-preferred result
| Labor | John Price | 20,102 | 51.0 | +1.9 |
| Liberal | Peter Blackmore | 19,347 | 49.0 | −1.9 |
| Labor gain from Liberal | | Swing | +1.9 | |

==== 1995 ====
1995 New South Wales state election: Maitland
| Party | Candidate | Votes | % | ±% |
|---|---|---|---|---|
| Liberal | Peter Blackmore | 19,008 | 50.9 | +14.2 |
| Labor | Tony Keating | 15,149 | 40.6 | +4.1 |
| Greens | Jan Davis | 1,973 | 5.3 | +5.3 |
| Democrats | Mike Bellamy | 1,208 | 3.2 | −0.1 |
| Total formal votes | | 37,338 | 96.7 | +4.2 |
| Informal votes | | 1,277 | 3.3 | −4.2 |
| Turnout | | 38,615 | 96.5 | |
Two-party-preferred result
| Liberal | Peter Blackmore | 19,863 | 54.1 | +3.5 |
| Labor | Tony Keating | 16,851 | 45.9 | −3.5 |
| Liberal hold | | Swing | +3.5 | |

==== 1991 ====
1991 New South Wales state election: Maitland
| Party | Candidate | Votes | % | ±% |
|---|---|---|---|---|
| Liberal | Peter Blackmore | 12,046 | 36.7 | +10.3 |
| Labor | Tony Keating | 11,973 | 36.5 | +3.4 |
| Independent | Bob Horne | 5,288 | 16.1 | +16.1 |
| Independent | Pat Hughes | 1,744 | 5.3 | +5.3 |
| Democrats | Malcolm Martin | 1,079 | 3.3 | +0.5 |
| Call to Australia | Tom Toogood | 672 | 2.0 | +2.0 |
| Total formal votes | | 32,802 | 92.5 | −5.2 |
| Informal votes | | 2,671 | 7.5 | +5.2 |
| Turnout | | 35,473 | 96.2 | |
Two-party-preferred result
| Liberal | Peter Blackmore | 14,680 | 50.6 | −6.8 |
| Labor | Tony Keating | 14,335 | 49.4 | +6.8 |
| Liberal gain from Labor | | Swing | −6.8 | |

=== Elections in the 1980s ===
==== 1988 ====
1988 New South Wales state election: Maitland
| Party | Candidate | Votes | % | ±% |
|---|---|---|---|---|
| Labor | Alan Walsh | 12,759 | 40.5 | −21.7 |
| Liberal | Graham Dunkley | 9,985 | 31.7 | +4.4 |
| Independent | Rodney Allen | 4,922 | 15.6 | +15.6 |
| Independent | Kevin Cousins | 3,319 | 10.5 | +10.5 |
| Democrats | Derek McCabe | 510 | 1.6 | +1.6 |
| Total formal votes | | 31,495 | 97.5 | −1.0 |
| Informal votes | | 803 | 2.5 | +1.0 |
| Turnout | | 32,298 | 95.7 | |
Two-party-preferred result
| Labor | Alan Walsh | 14,911 | 50.8 | −13.1 |
| Liberal | Graham Dunkley | 14,467 | 49.2 | +13.1 |
| Labor hold | | Swing | −13.1 | |

==== 1984 ====
1984 New South Wales state election: Maitland
| Party | Candidate | Votes | % | ±% |
|---|---|---|---|---|
| Labor | Allan Walsh | 18,178 | 56.9 | +3.9 |
| Liberal | Donald Wilkinson | 9,704 | 30.4 | −6.5 |
| National | Robert Gee | 4,052 | 12.7 | +12.7 |
| Total formal votes | | 31,934 | 98.6 | +0.2 |
| Informal votes | | 437 | 1.4 | −0.2 |
| Turnout | | 32,371 | 94.5 | 0.0 |
Two-party-preferred result
| Labor | Allan Walsh | | 58.9 | +1.4 |
| Liberal | Donald Wilkinson | | 41.1 | −1.4 |
| Labor hold | | Swing | +1.4 | |

==== 1981 ====
1981 New South Wales state election: Maitland
| Party | Candidate | Votes | % | ±% |
|---|---|---|---|---|
| Labor | Allan Walsh | 15,663 | 53.0 | +2.8 |
| Liberal | Peter Toms | 10,891 | 36.8 | −13.0 |
| Independent | Herbert Collins | 1,832 | 6.2 | +6.2 |
| Independent | James Roberts | 1,168 | 4.0 | +4.0 |
| Total formal votes | | 29,554 | 98.4 | |
| Informal votes | | 465 | 1.6 | |
| Turnout | | 30,019 | 94.5 | |
Two-party-preferred result
| Labor | Allan Walsh | 16,063 | 57.5 | +7.2 |
| Liberal | Peter Toms | 11,891 | 42.5 | −7.2 |
| Labor notional hold | | Swing | +7.2 | |

The sitting member was Peter Toms (Liberal), however Maitland had become notionally held by Labor due to the redistribution.

==== 1981 by-election ====
1981 Maitland by-election Saturday 21 February
| Party | Candidate | Votes | % | ±% |
|---|---|---|---|---|
| Liberal | Peter Toms | 13,014 | 48.0 | −6.3 |
| Labor | Allan Walsh | 12,201 | 45.0 | −0.7 |
| Independent | Daphne Unicomb | 1,887 | 7.0 | |
| Total formal votes | | 27,102 | 98.8 | |
| Informal votes | | 319 | 1.2 | |
| Turnout | | 27,421 | 90.1 | |
Two-party-preferred result
| Liberal | Peter Toms | 13,750 | 51.5 | −2.8 |
| Labor | Allan Walsh | 12,963 | 48.5 | +2.8 |
| Liberal hold | | Swing | −2.8 | |

Milton Morris (Liberal) resigned to unsuccessfully contest the seat of contested the federal seat of Lyne.

=== Elections in the 1970s ===
==== 1978 ====
1978 New South Wales state election: Maitland
| Party | Candidate | Votes | % | ±% |
|---|---|---|---|---|
| Liberal | Milton Morris | 14,800 | 54.3 | −5.5 |
| Labor | Noel Unicomb | 12,435 | 45.7 | +5.5 |
| Total formal votes | | 27,235 | 98.5 | −0.2 |
| Informal votes | | 419 | 1.5 | +0.2 |
| Turnout | | 27,654 | 96.2 | +0.8 |
| Liberal hold | | Swing | −5.5 | |

==== 1976 ====
1976 New South Wales state election: Maitland
| Party | Candidate | Votes | % | ±% |
|---|---|---|---|---|
| Liberal | Milton Morris | 15,565 | 59.8 | −4.6 |
| Labor | Kerry Ryan | 10,450 | 40.2 | +11.1 |
| Total formal votes | | 26,015 | 98.7 | +0.4 |
| Informal votes | | 348 | 1.3 | −0.4 |
| Turnout | | 26,363 | 95.4 | −0.8 |
| Liberal hold | | Swing | −9.8 | |

==== 1973 ====
1973 New South Wales state election: Maitland
| Party | Candidate | Votes | % | ±% |
|---|---|---|---|---|
| Liberal | Milton Morris | 15,295 | 64.4 | +6.4 |
| Labor | George Lyons | 6,894 | 29.1 | −6.6 |
| Democratic Labor | Reginald Hughes | 1,542 | 6.5 | +0.2 |
| Total formal votes | | 23,731 | 98.3 | |
| Informal votes | | 401 | 1.7 | |
| Turnout | | 24,132 | 96.2 | |
Two-party-preferred result
| Liberal | Milton Morris | 16,517 | 69.6 | +6.1 |
| Labor | George Lyons | 7,214 | 30.4 | −6.1 |
| Liberal hold | | Swing | +6.1 | |

==== 1971 ====
1971 New South Wales state election: Maitland
| Party | Candidate | Votes | % | ±% |
|---|---|---|---|---|
| Liberal | Milton Morris | 11,470 | 56.0 | −10.2 |
| Labor | Francis Murray | 7,721 | 37.7 | +9.2 |
| Democratic Labor | Herbert Collins | 1,299 | 6.3 | +1.0 |
| Total formal votes | | 20,490 | 98.7 | |
| Informal votes | | 260 | 1.3 | |
| Turnout | | 20,750 | 96.0 | |
Two-party-preferred result
| Liberal | Milton Morris | 12,509 | 61.0 | −9.4 |
| Labor | Francis Murray | 7,981 | 39.0 | +9.4 |
| Liberal hold | | Swing | −9.4 | |

=== Elections in the 1960s ===
==== 1968 ====
1968 New South Wales state election: Maitland
| Party | Candidate | Votes | % | ±% |
|---|---|---|---|---|
| Liberal | Milton Morris | 14,121 | 66.2 | +2.0 |
| Labor | George Lyons | 6,085 | 28.5 | −7.3 |
| Democratic Labor | Aubrey Barr | 1,128 | 5.3 | +5.3 |
| Total formal votes | | 21,334 | 98.4 | |
| Informal votes | | 350 | 1.6 | |
| Turnout | | 21,684 | 96.1 | |
Two-party-preferred result
| Liberal | Milton Morris | 15,023 | 70.4 | +6.2 |
| Labor | George Lyons | 6,311 | 29.6 | −6.2 |
| Liberal hold | | Swing | +6.2 | |

==== 1965 ====
1965 New South Wales state election: Maitland
| Party | Candidate | Votes | % | ±% |
|---|---|---|---|---|
| Liberal | Milton Morris | 13,158 | 64.2 | +6.3 |
| Labor | Wallace Fitzgerald | 7,344 | 35.8 | −6.3 |
| Total formal votes | | 20,502 | 98.9 | −0.2 |
| Informal votes | | 227 | 1.1 | +0.2 |
| Turnout | | 20,729 | 96.4 | +0.5 |
| Liberal hold | | Swing | +6.3 | |

==== 1962 ====
1962 New South Wales state election: Maitland
| Party | Candidate | Votes | % | ±% |
|---|---|---|---|---|
| Liberal | Milton Morris | 11,325 | 57.9 | +5.7 |
| Labor | George Lyons | 8,235 | 42.1 | +1.3 |
| Total formal votes | | 19,560 | 99.1 | |
| Informal votes | | 182 | 0.9 | |
| Turnout | | 19,742 | 95.9 | |
| Liberal hold | | Swing | +0.3 | |

=== Elections in the 1950s ===
==== 1959 ====
1959 New South Wales state election: Maitland
| Party | Candidate | Votes | % | ±% |
|---|---|---|---|---|
| Liberal | Milton Morris | 8,552 | 52.2 | |
| Labor | William Harvey | 6,681 | 40.8 | |
| Democratic Labor | Douglas Drinkwater | 1,011 | 6.2 | |
| Independent | Henry Ivins | 138 | 0.8 | |
| Total formal votes | | 16,382 | 98.7 | |
| Informal votes | | 212 | 1.3 | |
| Turnout | | 16,594 | 96.0 | |
Two-party-preferred result
| Liberal | Milton Morris | 9,430 | 57.6 | |
| Labor | William Harvey | 6,952 | 42.4 | |
| Liberal hold | | Swing | | |

==== 1956 ====
1956 New South Wales state election: Maitland
| Party | Candidate | Votes | % | ±% |
|---|---|---|---|---|
| Liberal | Milton Morris | 7,195 | 45.9 | −7.9 |
| Labor | Cecil Robinson | 6,580 | 42.0 | −4.2 |
| Independent | Leonard Neville | 918 | 5.9 | +5.9 |
| Independent | Edward Fletcher | 715 | 4.6 | +4.6 |
| Independent | Henry Ivins | 267 | 1.7 | +1.7 |
| Total formal votes | | 15,675 | 98.2 | −0.4 |
| Informal votes | | 289 | 1.8 | +0.4 |
| Turnout | | 15,964 | 95.8 | −0.8 |
Two-party-preferred result
| Liberal | Milton Morris | 8,778 | 56.0 | +2.1 |
| Labor | Cecil Robinson | 6,897 | 44.0 | −2.1 |
| Liberal hold | | Swing | +2.1 | |

==== 1953 ====
1953 New South Wales state election: Maitland
| Party | Candidate | Votes | % | ±% |
|---|---|---|---|---|
| Liberal | Walter Howarth | 8,520 | 53.8 | |
| Labor | Leonard Neville | 7,302 | 46.2 | |
| Total formal votes | | 15,822 | 98.6 | |
| Informal votes | | 216 | 1.4 | |
| Turnout | | 16,038 | 96.6 | |
| Liberal hold | | Swing | | |

==== 1950 ====
1950 New South Wales state election: Maitland
| Party | Candidate | Votes | % | ±% |
|---|---|---|---|---|
| Liberal | Walter Howarth | 8,653 | 62.1 | |
| Labor | Kevin Barlow | 5,274 | 37.9 | |
| Total formal votes | | 13,927 | 98.7 | |
| Informal votes | | 187 | 1.3 | |
| Turnout | | 14,114 | 86.1 | |
| Liberal hold | | Swing | | |

=== Elections in the 1940s ===
==== 1947 ====
1947 New South Wales state election: Maitland
| Party | Candidate | Votes | % | ±% |
|---|---|---|---|---|
| Liberal | Walter Howarth | 9,245 | 60.8 | +5.9 |
| Labor | Walter O'Hearn | 5,963 | 39.2 | −5.9 |
| Total formal votes | | 15,208 | 99.0 | +0.5 |
| Informal votes | | 154 | 1.0 | −0.5 |
| Turnout | | 15,362 | 97.1 | +3.7 |
| Liberal hold | | Swing | +5.9 | |

==== 1944 ====
1944 New South Wales state election: Maitland
| Party | Candidate | Votes | % | ±% |
|---|---|---|---|---|
| Democratic | Walter Howarth | 7,626 | 54.9 | +4.4 |
| Labor | William Lindsay | 6,275 | 45.1 | −4.4 |
| Total formal votes | | 13,901 | 98.5 | −0.2 |
| Informal votes | | 211 | 1.5 | +0.2 |
| Turnout | | 14,112 | 93.4 | −2.6 |
| Democratic hold | | Swing | +4.4 | |

==== 1941 ====
1941 New South Wales state election: Maitland
| Party | Candidate | Votes | % | ±% |
|---|---|---|---|---|
| United Australia | Walter Howarth | 6,934 | 50.5 | |
| Labor | William Lindsay | 6,798 | 49.5 | |
| Total formal votes | | 13,732 | 98.7 | |
| Informal votes | | 180 | 1.3 | |
| Turnout | | 13,912 | 96.0 | |
| United Australia hold | | Swing | | |

=== Elections in the 1930s ===
==== 1938 ====
1938 New South Wales state election: Maitland
| Party | Candidate | Votes | % | ±% |
|---|---|---|---|---|
| United Australia | Walter Howarth | 7,861 | 61.2 | +3.9 |
| Labor | Walter O'Hearn | 4,988 | 38.8 | −3.9 |
| Total formal votes | | 12,849 | 98.9 | +0.3 |
| Informal votes | | 137 | 1.1 | −0.3 |
| Turnout | | 12,986 | 97.9 | −0.2 |
| United Australia hold | | Swing | +3.9 | |

==== 1935 ====
1935 New South Wales state election: Maitland
| Party | Candidate | Votes | % | ±% |
|---|---|---|---|---|
| United Australia | Walter Howarth | 7,262 | 57.3 | +18.1 |
| Labor (NSW) | Walter O'Hearn | 5,420 | 42.7 | +3.0 |
| Total formal votes | | 12,682 | 98.6 | 0.0 |
| Informal votes | | 182 | 1.4 | 0.0 |
| Turnout | | 12,864 | 98.1 | +0.2 |
| United Australia hold | | Swing | −1.2 | |

==== 1932 ====
1932 New South Wales state election: Maitland
| Party | Candidate | Votes | % | ±% |
|---|---|---|---|---|
| Labor (NSW) | Walter O'Hearn | 4,872 | 39.7 | −14.2 |
| United Australia | Walter Howarth | 4,806 | 39.2 | −6.5 |
| Country | Alexander McDonald | 2,498 | 20.4 | +20.4 |
| Communist | James Heatherill | 92 | 0.7 | +0.2 |
| Total formal votes | | 12,268 | 98.6 | +0.1 |
| Informal votes | | 174 | 1.4 | −0.1 |
| Turnout | | 12,442 | 97.9 | −0.2 |
Two-party-preferred result
| United Australia | Walter Howarth | 7,175 | 58.5 | +12.7 |
| Labor (NSW) | Walter O'Hearn | 5,093 | 41.5 | −12.7 |
| United Australia gain from Labor (NSW) | | Swing | +12.7 | |

==== 1930 ====
1930 New South Wales state election: Maitland
| Party | Candidate | Votes | % | ±% |
|---|---|---|---|---|
| Labor | Walter O'Hearn | 6,479 | 53.9 | |
| Nationalist | Walter Howarth | 5,499 | 45.7 | |
| Communist | John Harvey | 54 | 0.5 | |
| Total formal votes | | 12,032 | 98.5 | |
| Informal votes | | 184 | 1.5 | |
| Turnout | | 12,216 | 98.1 | |
| Labor hold | | Swing | | |

=== Elections in the 1920s ===
==== 1927 ====
This section is an excerpt from 1927 New South Wales state election § Maitland

1927 New South Wales state election: Maitland
| Party | Candidate | Votes | % | ±% |
|---|---|---|---|---|
| Labor | Walter O'Hearn | 7,209 | 55.4 | |
| Nationalist | Walter Howarth | 5,803 | 44.6 | |
| Total formal votes | | 13,012 | 99.2 | |
| Informal votes | | 107 | 0.8 | |
| Turnout | | 13,119 | 86.5 | |
| Labor win | | (new seat) | | |

==== 1925 ====
This section is an excerpt from 1925 New South Wales state election § Maitland

1925 New South Wales state election: Maitland
| Party | Candidate | Votes | % | ±% |
|---|---|---|---|---|
| Quota | | 7,304 | | |
| Nationalist | Walter Bennett (elected 2) | 6,989 | 23.9 | +4.2 |
| Nationalist | William Cameron (elected 3) | 5,856 | 20.0 | +2.6 |
| Nationalist | Charles Nicholson | 2,729 | 9.3 | +9.3 |
| Labor | Walter O'Hearn (elected 1) | 11,075 | 37.9 | +7.1 |
| Labor | John Hynes | 782 | 2.7 | +2.7 |
| Labor | William McClelland | 292 | 1.0 | +1.0 |
| Protestant Labour | George Batey | 1,490 | 5.1 | +5.1 |
| Total formal votes | | 29,213 | 96.7 | +0.7 |
| Informal votes | | 990 | 3.3 | −0.7 |
| Turnout | | 30,203 | 68.3 | −1.2 |
Party total votes
| Nationalist | | 15,574 | 53.3 | 0.0 |
| Labor | | 12,149 | 41.6 | +7.4 |
| Protestant Labour | | 1,490 | 5.1 | +5.1 |

==== 1922 ====
This section is an excerpt from 1922 New South Wales state election § Maitland

1922 New South Wales state election: Maitland
| Party | Candidate | Votes | % | ±% |
|---|---|---|---|---|
| Quota | | 6,863 | | |
| Nationalist | Walter Bennett (elected 3) | 5,410 | 19.7 | +2.0 |
| Nationalist | William Cameron (elected 2) | 4,784 | 17.4 | +7.4 |
| Nationalist | George Walter | 4,446 | 16.2 | +16.2 |
| Labor | Walter O'Hearn (elected 1) | 8,461 | 30.8 | +12.8 |
| Labor | William Brennan | 801 | 2.9 | 2.9 |
| Labor | John Culbert | 117 | 0.4 | +0.4 |
| Progressive | Benjamin Gelling | 2,060 | 7.5 | +7.5 |
| Progressive | Cecil Tindale | 1,150 | 4.2 | −1.8 |
| Progressive | Herbert Ralston | 175 | 0.6 | +0.6 |
| Independent | Patrick Ferry | 47 | 0.2 | +0.2 |
| Total formal votes | | 27,451 | 96.0 | +4.5 |
| Informal votes | | 1,130 | 4.0 | −4.5 |
| Turnout | | 28,581 | 69.5 | +14.2 |
Party total votes
| Nationalist | | 14,640 | 53.3 | +21.2 |
| Labor | | 9,379 | 34.2 | −2.9 |
| Progressive | | 3,385 | 12.3 | −17.6 |
| Independent | Patrick Ferry | 47 | 0.2 | +0.2 |

==== 1920 ====
This section is an excerpt from 1920 New South Wales state election § Maitland

1920 New South Wales state election: Maitland
| Party | Candidate | Votes | % | ±% |
|---|---|---|---|---|
| Quota | | 4,824 | | |
| Labor | Walter O'Hearn (elected 2) | 3,477 | 18.0 | |
| Labor | William Brennan | 2,253 | 11.7 | |
| Labor | Dionysius McGuire | 1,419 | 7.4 | |
| Nationalist | Charles Nicholson (defeated) | 3,439 | 17.8 | |
| Nationalist | William Cameron (elected 3) | 1,925 | 10.0 | |
| Nationalist | Stephen Hungerford | 824 | 4.3 | |
| Progressive | Walter Bennett (elected 1) | 3,418 | 17.7 | |
| Progressive | William Roberts | 1,199 | 6.2 | |
| Progressive | Cecil Tindale | 1,162 | 6.0 | |
| Independent | Joseph Compton | 121 | 0.6 | |
| Independent | Thomas Hays | 57 | 0.3 | |
| Total formal votes | | 19,294 | 91.5 | |
| Informal votes | | 1,785 | 8.5 | |
| Turnout | | 21,079 | 55.3 | |
Party total votes
| Labor | | 7,149 | 37.1 | |
| Nationalist | | 6,188 | 32.1 | |
| Progressive | | 5,779 | 30.0 | |
| Independent | Joseph Compton | 121 | 0.6 | |
| Independent | Thomas Hays | 57 | 0.3 | |

=== Elections in the 1910s ===
==== 1917 ====
This section is an excerpt from 1917 New South Wales state election § Maitland

1917 New South Wales state election: Maitland
| Party | Candidate | Votes | % | ±% |
|---|---|---|---|---|
| Nationalist | Charles Nicholson | 4,012 | 61.7 | +11.1 |
| Labor | William Brennan | 2,492 | 38.3 | −11.1 |
| Total formal votes | | 6,504 | 99.2 | +1.6 |
| Informal votes | | 52 | 0.8 | −1.6 |
| Turnout | | 6,556 | 64.8 | −13.2 |
| Nationalist hold | | Swing | +11.1 | |

==== 1913 ====
This section is an excerpt from 1913 New South Wales state election § Maitland

1913 New South Wales state election: Maitland
| Party | Candidate | Votes | % | ±% |
|---|---|---|---|---|
| Liberal Reform | Charles Nicholson | 4,072 | 50.6 | |
| Labor | John Fletcher | 3,975 | 49.4 | |
| Total formal votes | | 8,047 | 97.6 | |
| Informal votes | | 195 | 2.4 | |
| Turnout | | 8,242 | 78.0 | |
| Liberal Reform gain from Independent Liberal | | | | |

- John Gillies (Independent Liberal) died in 1911. The by-election in October 1911 was won by Charles Nicholson (Liberal Reform) who retained the seat at the 1913 general election.

==== 1911 by-election ====
1911 Maitland by-election Saturday 28 October
| Party | Candidate | Votes | % | ±% |
|---|---|---|---|---|
| Liberal Reform | Charles Nicholson | 3,701 | 56.1 | |
| Labour | Laurence Vial | 2,902 | 43.9 | +7.8 |
| Total formal votes | | 6,603 | 99.0 | +0.8 |
| Informal votes | | 147 | 1.0 | −0.8 |
| Turnout | | 6,668 | 78.8 (Note: estimate based on an electoral roll of 8,457 at the 1910 election.) | +8.9 |
| Liberal Reform gain from Independent Liberal | | Swing | N/A | |

John Gillies (Independent Liberal) died.

==== 1910 ====
1910 New South Wales state election: Maitland
| Party | Candidate | Votes | % | ±% |
|---|---|---|---|---|
| Independent Liberal | John Gillies | 3,708 | 63.9 | −18.8 |
| Labour | Laurence Vial | 2,091 | 36.1 | +18.8 |
| Total formal votes | | 5,799 | 98.2 | +3.2 |
| Informal votes | | 109 | 1.8 | −3.2 |
| Turnout | | 5,908 | 69.9 | +10.8 |
| Member changed to Independent Liberal from Liberal Reform | | | | |

=== Elections in the 1900s ===
==== 1907 ====
This section is an excerpt from 1907 New South Wales state election § Maitland

1907 New South Wales state election: Maitland
| Party | Candidate | Votes | % | ±% |
|---|---|---|---|---|
| Liberal Reform | John Gillies | 3,563 | 82.7 | |
| Labour | Samuel Rees | 746 | 17.3 | |
| Total formal votes | | 4,309 | 95.0 | |
| Informal votes | | 229 | 5.1 | |
| Turnout | | 4,538 | 59.1 | |
| Member changed to Liberal Reform from Progressive | | | | |

==== 1904 ====
This section is an excerpt from 1904 New South Wales state election § Maitland

1904 New South Wales state election: Maitland
| Party | Candidate | Votes | % | ±% |
|---|---|---|---|---|
| Progressive | John Gillies | 2,803 | 51.5 | |
| Liberal Reform | James Brunker | 2,632 | 48.4 | |
| Independent | David Mackenzie | 4 | 0.1 | |
| Total formal votes | | 5,439 | 98.7 | |
| Informal votes | | 73 | 1.3 | |
| Turnout | | 5,512 | 70.4 | |
| Progressive win | | (new seat) | | |

Maitland was a new seat comprising parts of the abolished seats of East Maitland and West Maitland. John Gillies was the Independent member for West Maitland, while James Brunker was the Liberal Reform member for East Maitland.
