= 1981 Maitland state by-election =

Election results for Maitland, New South Wales, Australia

A by-election was held for the New South Wales Legislative Assembly electorate of Maitland on 21 February 1981 following the resignation of Milton Morris (Liberal) to unsuccessfully contest the federal seat of Lyne at the 1980 election.

By-elections for the seats of Cessnock, Oxley and Sturt were held on the same day.

The Liberal candidate Peter Toms retained the seat for the party despite a negative swing, defeating Labor candidate Allan Walsh. New South Wales premier Neville Wran attributed Walsh's defeat to the spoiler effect of Daphne Unicomb, who stood as an independent in protest at her husband's preselection defeat to Walsh.

== Dates ==
| Date | Event |
|---|---|
| 29 August 1980 | Resignation of Milton Morris. |
| 18 October 1980 | 1980 Australian federal election |
| 22 January 1981 | Writ of election issued by the Speaker of the Legislative Assembly and close of electoral rolls. |
| 29 January 1981 | Day of nomination |
| 21 February 1981 | Polling day |
| 13 March 1981 | Return of writ |

== Result ==
1981 Maitland by-election Saturday 21 February
| Party | Candidate | Votes | % | ±% |
|---|---|---|---|---|
| Liberal | Peter Toms | 13,014 | 48.0 | −6.3 |
| Labor | Allan Walsh | 12,201 | 45.0 | −0.7 |
| Independent | Daphne Unicomb | 1,887 | 7.0 | |
| Total formal votes | | 27,102 | 98.8 | |
| Informal votes | | 319 | 1.2 | |
| Turnout | | 27,421 | 90.1 | |
Two-party-preferred result
| Liberal | Peter Toms | 13,750 | 51.5 | −2.8 |
| Labor | Allan Walsh | 12,963 | 48.5 | +2.8 |
| Liberal hold | | Swing | −2.8 | |

== Aftermath ==
Peter Toms' career was to be short-lived, as he was defeated by Allan Walsh in the Labor "Wranslide" at the election in September 1981.

== See also ==
- Electoral results for the district of Maitland
- List of New South Wales state by-elections
