= Results of the 1981 New South Wales Legislative Assembly election =

State election for New South Wales, Australia in March 1981

New South Wales state election, 19 September 1981 Legislative Assembly << 1978–1984 >>
Enrolled voters	3,178,225 (Note: There were 3,212,657 enrolled voters but 34,432 were enrolled in South Coast (Independent) which was uncontested at the election.)				
Votes cast	2,897,033		Turnout	91.15	–1.62
Informal votes	89,306		Informal	3.08	+0.80
Summary of votes by party
Party	Primary votes	%	Swing	Seats	Change
Labor	1,564,622	55.73	–2.04	69	+ 6
Liberal	775,463	27.62	+0.64	14	– 4
National Country	314,841	11.21	+1.31	14	– 3
Democrats	68,252	2.43	–0.22	0	± 0
Communist	6,150	0.22	–0.08	0	± 0
Independent	78,399	2.79	+0.55	2	+ 1
Total	2,807,727			99	
Two-party-preferred
Labor		58.7%	-2.0%		
Liberal/National		41.3%	+2.0%		

The 1981 New South Wales state election involved 99 electoral districts returning one member each. The election was conducted on the basis of optional preferential voting system. There was a significant change from the 1978 election as a result of the passage of the Parliamentary Electorates and Elections (Amendment) Act 1979, and the Constitution (Amendment) Act 1979. The effect of these Acts was to end the electoral malapportionment requiring that the number of electors within each electoral district be within 10%. Under the previous zoning system, a seat in the "central area" had a quota of 34,067, but could be as high as 40,880 while a "country area" seat had a quota of 26,016 but could be as low as 20,813. The effect of the 1980 redistribution was to create 6 new seats in Sydney Newcastle and Wollongong and abolishing 6 country seats.

== Results by Electoral district ==
=== Albury ===
1981 New South Wales state election: Albury
Party	Candidate	Votes	%	±%
Labor	Harold Mair	15,850	55.3	+7.1
Liberal	Brian Moriarty	12,833	44.7	+5.5
Total formal votes		28,683	98.4	
Informal votes		466	1.6	
Turnout		29,149	90.1	
Labor hold		Swing	+7.6	

=== Ashfield ===
1981 New South Wales state election: Ashfield
Party	Candidate	Votes	%	±%
Labor	Paul Whelan	17,449	65.5	−2.7
Liberal	George Dryden	8,078	30.3	−1.6
Democrats	Albert Jarman	1,095	4.1	+4.1
Total formal votes		26,622	95.2	
Informal votes		1,338	4.8	
Turnout		27,960	88.1	
Two-party-preferred result
Labor	Paul Whelan	17,559	68.2	+0.1
Liberal	George Dryden	8,178	31.8	−0.1
Labor hold		Swing	+0.1	

=== Auburn ===
1981 New South Wales state election: Auburn
Party	Candidate	Votes	%	±%
Labor	Peter Cox	18,537	70.3	−3.2
Liberal	David Lynam	7,840	29.7	+5.4
Total formal votes		26,377	95.4	
Informal votes		1,262	4.6	
Turnout		27,639	91.4	
Labor hold		Swing	−4.8	

=== Balmain ===
1981 New South Wales state election: Balmain
Party	Candidate	Votes	%	±%
Labor	Roger Degen	14,444	59.2	−15.1
Liberal	Dianne Street	3,553	14.6	+0.3
Independent	Douglas Spedding	3,162	13.0	+13.0
Democrats	Franco Paisio	1,712	7.0	+7.0
Communist	Denis Freney	849	3.5	−0.5
Socialist	James Donovan	676	2.8	+2.8
Total formal votes		24,396	95.4	
Informal votes		1,167	4.6	
Turnout		25,563	86.3	
Two-party-preferred result
Labor	Roger Degen	19,044	81.0	−3.2
Liberal	Dianne Street	4,453	18.9	+3.2
Labor hold		Swing	−3.2	

=== Bankstown ===
1981 New South Wales state election: Bankstown
Party	Candidate	Votes	%	±%
Labor	Ric Mochalski	18,754	64.9	−8.1
Liberal	James McDonald	8,634	29.9	+9.2
Independent	Donna Hoban	1,513	5.2	+5.2
Total formal votes		28,901	95.8	
Informal votes		1,266	4.2	
Turnout		30,167	92.8	
Two-party-preferred result
Labor	Ric Mochalski	19,530	68.7	−7.1
Liberal	James McDonald	8,900	31.3	+7.1
Labor hold		Swing	−7.1	

=== Barwon ===
1981 New South Wales state election: Barwon
Party	Candidate	Votes	%	±%
National Country	Wal Murray	19,571	63.2	+4.9
Labor	Richard Emerson	11,389	36.8	−4.9
Total formal votes		30,960	98.1	
Informal votes		595	1.9	
Turnout		31,555	90.5	
National Country hold		Swing	+4.9	

=== Bass Hill ===
1981 New South Wales state election: Bass Hill
Party	Candidate	Votes	%	±%
Labor	Neville Wran	22,567	75.7	−2.8
Liberal	Paul Jones	7,263	24.3	+5.3
Total formal votes		29,830	96.6	
Informal votes		1,037	3.4	
Turnout		30,867	93.6	
Labor hold		Swing	−4.0	

=== Bathurst ===
1981 New South Wales state election: Bathurst
Party	Candidate	Votes	%	±%
Labor	Mick Clough	15,865	50.1	−7.6
National Country	Clive Osborne	15,834	49.9	+7.6
Total formal votes		31,699	98.0	
Informal votes		630	2.0	
Turnout		32,329	93.7	
Labor notional hold		Swing	−7.6	

The sitting member was Clive Osborne (National Country), however Bathurst had become notionally held by Labor due to the redistribution.

=== Blacktown ===
1981 New South Wales state election: Blacktown
Party	Candidate	Votes	%	±%
Labor	John Aquilina	20,777	73.1	0.0
Liberal	David Bannerman	7,644	26.9	+8.3
Total formal votes		28,421	95.9	
Informal votes		1,225	4.1	
Turnout		29,646	92.4	
Labor hold		Swing	−6.0	

=== Bligh ===
1981 New South Wales state election: Bligh
Party	Candidate	Votes	%	±%
Labor	Fred Miller	11,807	47.6	
Liberal	John Barraclough	10,997	44.3	
Democrats	Joseph Zingarelli	1,050	4.2	
Independent	George Warnecke	966	3.9	
Total formal votes		24,820	96.2	
Informal votes		977	3.8	
Turnout		25,797	82.8	
Two-party-preferred result
Labor	Fred Miller	12,876	52.7	−3.9
Liberal	John Barraclough	11,561	47.3	+3.9
Labor notional hold		Swing	−3.9	

The sitting member was John Barraclough (Liberal), however Bligh had become notionally held by Labor due to the redistribution.

=== Blue Mountains ===
1981 New South Wales state election: Blue Mountains
Party	Candidate	Votes	%	±%
Labor	Bob Debus	18,682	58.4	−3.5
Liberal	Reg Gillard	12,637	39.5	+39.5
Independent	Harry Marsh	696	2.2	+2.2
Total formal votes		32,015	97.6	
Informal votes		784	2.4	
Turnout		32,799	91.4	
Two-party-preferred result
Labor	Bob Debus	18,782	59.6	−0.5
Liberal	Reg Gillard	12,737	40.4	+40.4
Labor hold		Swing	−0.5	

=== Broken Hill ===
1981 New South Wales state election: Broken Hill
Party	Candidate	Votes	%	±%
Labor	Bill Beckroge	17,041	69.0	
National Country	George Gleeson	7,647	31.0	
Total formal votes		24,688	96.9	
Informal votes		779	3.1	
Turnout		25,467	88.8	
Labor hold		Swing	−3.0	

=== Burrinjuck ===
1981 New South Wales state election: Burrinjuck
Party	Candidate	Votes	%	±%
Labor	Terry Sheahan	17,709	55.6	−4.0
National Country	John Harvey	13,190	41.4	+1.0
Democrats	Scott Milne	939	3.0	+3.0
Total formal votes		31,838	98.7	
Informal votes		420	1.3	
Turnout		32,258	94.4	
Two-party-preferred result
Labor	Terry Sheahan	17,804	57.2	−2.4
National Country	John Harvey	13,299	42.8	+2.4
Labor hold		Swing	−2.4	

=== Burwood ===
1981 New South Wales state election: Burwood
Party	Candidate	Votes	%	±%
Labor	Phil O'Neill	14,976	55.2	+5.5
Liberal	Bruce MacCarthy	11,334	41.8	−4.9
Democrats	Stephen Kirkham	834	3.1	−0.5
Total formal votes		27,144	96.5	
Informal votes		970	3.5	
Turnout		28,114	90.3	
Two-party-preferred result
Labor	Phil O'Neill	15,076	56.9	+2.2
Liberal	Bruce MacCarthy	11,434	43.1	−2.2
Labor hold		Swing	+2.2	

=== Byron ===
1981 New South Wales state election: Byron
Party	Candidate	Votes	%	±%
National Country	Jack Boyd	15,855	52.2	+2.0
Labor	Thomas Hogan	13,334	43.9	+1.3
Democrats	Kenneth Nicholson	1,170	3.9	−0.9
Total formal votes		30,359	97.4	
Informal votes		821	2.6	
Turnout		31,180	90.2	
Two-party-preferred result
National Country	Jack Boyd	15,955	54.3	+0.7
Labor	Thomas Hogan	13,434	45.7	−0.7
National Country hold		Swing	+0.7	

=== Cabramatta ===
1981 New South Wales state election: Cabramatta
Party	Candidate	Votes	%	±%
Labor	Eric Bedford	19,137	74.0	−4.2
Liberal	Kerry Chikarovski	6,725	26.0	+4.2
Total formal votes		25,862	95.0	
Informal votes		1,367	5.0	
Turnout		27,229	89.9	
Labor notional hold		Swing	−4.2	

=== Camden ===
1981 New South Wales state election: Camden
Party	Candidate	Votes	%	±%
Labor	Ralph Brading	14,478	47.4	
Liberal	Peter Reynolds	13,975	45.7	
Democrats	Raymond Guy	2,109	6.9	
Total formal votes		30,562	97.1	
Informal votes		913	2.9	
Turnout		31,475	92.3	
Two-party-preferred result
Labor	Ralph Brading	15,657	52.0	−2.1
Liberal	Peter Reynolds	14,457	48.0	+2.1
Labor notional hold		Swing	−2.1	

=== Campbelltown ===
1981 New South Wales state election: Campbelltown
Party	Candidate	Votes	%	±%
Labor	Michael Knight	16,599	52.7	−14.9
Independent	Gordon Fetterplace	12,836	40.7	+40.7
Independent	William Dowsett	1,546	4.9	+4.9
Independent	William O'Donnell	543	1.7	+1.7
Total formal votes		31,524	97.6	
Informal votes		765	2.4	
Turnout		32,289	91.6	
Two-candidate-preferred result
Labor	Michael Knight		56.0	−15.5
Independent	Gordon Fetterplace		44.0	+44.0
Labor hold		Swing	−15.5	

=== Canterbury ===
1981 New South Wales state election: Canterbury
Party	Candidate	Votes	%	±%
Labor	Kevin Stewart	21,681	78.6	+4.6
Liberal	Colin Thew	5,917	21.4	−4.6
Total formal votes		27,598	95.0	
Informal votes		1,454	5.0	
Turnout		29,052	90.4	
Labor hold		Swing	+4.6	

=== Castlereagh ===
1981 New South Wales state election: Castlereagh
Party	Candidate	Votes	%	±%
National Country	Roger Wotton	16,636	53.4	
Labor	Jim Curran	14,529	46.6	
Total formal votes		31,165	98.5	
Informal votes		461	1.5	
Turnout		31,626	92.2	
National Country notional hold		Swing	−0.9	

The sitting member was Jim Curran (Labor), however Castlereagh had become notionally held by National Country due to the redistribution.

=== Cessnock ===
1981 New South Wales state election: Cessnock
Party	Candidate	Votes	%	±%
Labor	Stan Neilly	23,015	77.5	−1.6
Liberal	James White	5,406	18.2	−2.7
Democrats	Gregory Mutton	1,263	4.3	+4.3
Total formal votes		29,684	97.8	
Informal votes		659	2.2	
Turnout		30,343	94.5	
Two-party-preferred result
Labor	Stan Neilly	23,215	80.5	+1.4
Liberal	James White	5,606	19.5	−1.4
Labor hold		Swing	+1.4	

=== Charlestown ===
1981 New South Wales state election: Charlestown
Party	Candidate	Votes	%	±%
Labor	Richard Face	21,223	68.3	+0.9
Liberal	Robert Cowley	9,853	31.7	−0.9
Total formal votes		31,076	97.4	
Informal votes		840	2.6	
Turnout		31,916	93.2	
Labor hold		Swing	+0.9	

=== Clarence ===
1981 New South Wales state election: Clarence
Party	Candidate	Votes	%	±%
Labor	Don Day	18,035	56.6	
National Country	William Ralston	13,807	43.4	
Total formal votes		31,842	98.7	
Informal votes		412	1.3	
Turnout		32,254	92.9	
Labor notional hold		Swing	+3.8	

Clarence had become notionally held by Labor due to the redistribution and the sitting member Matt Singleton (National Country), successfully contested Coffs Harbour.

=== Coffs Harbour ===
1981 New South Wales state election: Coffs Harbour
Party	Candidate	Votes	%	±%
National Country	Matt Singleton	18,375	59.3	−0.8
Labor	Joseph Moran	12,626	40.7	+0.8
Total formal votes		31,001	98.2	
Informal votes		561	1.8	
Turnout		31,562	91.0	
National Country notional hold		Swing	−0.8	

Coffs Harbour was a new district, notionally held by National Country. Matt Singleton (National Country) was the sitting member for Clarence which had become notionally held by Labor due to the redistribution.

=== Coogee ===
1981 New South Wales state election: Coogee
Party	Candidate	Votes	%	±%
Labor	Michael Cleary	16,668	64.3	+0.9
Liberal	Kenneth Finn	8,576	33.1	+1.0
Independent	Michael Gluyas	665	2.6	+2.6
Total formal votes		25,909	96.5	
Informal votes		933	3.5	
Turnout		26,842	87.1	
Two-party-preferred result
Labor	Michael Cleary	16,768	65.9	−0.5
Liberal	Kenneth Finn	8,676	34.1	+0.5
Labor hold		Swing	−0.5	

=== Corrimal ===
1981 New South Wales state election: Corrimal
Party	Candidate	Votes	%	±%
Labor	Laurie Kelly	20,874	70.0	+2.2
Liberal	Colin Bruton	6,574	22.1	−3.1
Democrats	Questa Gill	1,725	5.8	−1.2
Independent	Carol Blond	629	2.1	+2.1
Total formal votes		29,802	96.8	
Informal votes		969	3.2	
Turnout		30,771	93.1	
Two-party-preferred result
Labor	Laurie Kelly	21,074	75.7	+3.2
Liberal	Colin Bruton	6,774	24.3	−3.2
Labor hold		Swing	+3.2	

=== Cronulla ===
1981 New South Wales state election: Cronulla
Party	Candidate	Votes	%	±%
Labor	Michael Egan	15,406	55.3	−3.3
Liberal	Stephen Mutch	12,435	44.7	+3.3
Total formal votes		27,841	98.1	
Informal votes		549	1.9	
Turnout		28,390	91.5	
Labor hold		Swing	−3.3	

=== Davidson ===
1981 New South Wales state election: Davidson
Party	Candidate	Votes	%	±%
Liberal	Terry Metherell	16,498	57.8	+0.4
Labor	Julie Sutton	12,037	42.2	−0.4
Total formal votes		28,535	97.0	
Informal votes		869	3.0	
Turnout		29,404	91.6	
Liberal hold		Swing	+0.4	

=== Drummoyne ===
1981 New South Wales state election: Drummoyne
Party	Candidate	Votes	%	±%
Labor	Michael Maher	19,139	69.2	+0.3
Liberal	Sarah Hewson	6,635	24.0	−7.1
Democrats	Peter Nelson	1,869	6.8	+6.8
Total formal votes		27,643	96.0	
Informal votes		1,137	4.0	
Turnout		28,780	91.6	
Two-party-preferred result
Labor	Michael Maher	20,139	73.8	+4.9
Liberal	Sarah Hewson	7,135	26.2	−4.9
Labor hold		Swing	+4.9	

=== Dubbo ===
1981 New South Wales state election: Dubbo
Party	Candidate	Votes	%	±%
Labor	Peter Morgan	11,256	37.5	−9.1
National Country	Gerry Peacocke	10,972	36.5	+36.5
Liberal	Eric Woods	7,831	26.0	−27.4
Total formal votes		30,059	98.2	
Informal votes		542	1.8	
Turnout		30,601	92.4	
Two-party-preferred result
National Country	Gerry Peacocke	17,494	59.2	+59.2
Labor	Peter Morgan	12,042	40.8	−5.8
National Country gain from Liberal		Swing	N/A	

=== Earlwood ===
1981 New South Wales state election: Earlwood
Party	Candidate	Votes	%	±%
Labor	Ken Gabb	17,265	60.7	+0.6
Liberal	Shirley Watson	10,404	36.6	−1.2
Democrats	Paul Terrett	756	2.7	+2.7
Total formal votes		28,435	96.5	
Informal votes		1,022	3.5	
Turnout		29,457	92.8	
Two-party-preferred result
Labor	Ken Gabb	17,465	62.2	+0.6
Liberal	Shirley Watson	10,614	37.8	−0.6
Labor hold		Swing	+0.6	

=== East Hills ===
1981 New South Wales state election: East Hills
Party	Candidate	Votes	%	±%
Labor	Pat Rogan	20,656	68.9	−4.3
Liberal	Paul Brazier	6,570	21.9	−0.1
Democrats	Margaret Vitlin	2,777	9.3	+4.5
Total formal votes		30,003	96.8	
Informal votes		975	3.2	
Turnout		30,978	94.0	
Two-party-preferred result
Labor	Pat Rogan	21,156	74.9	−0.7
Liberal	Paul Brazier	7,090	25.1	+0.7
Labor hold		Swing	−0.7	

=== Eastwood ===
1981 New South Wales state election: Eastwood
Party	Candidate	Votes	%	±%
Liberal	Jim Clough	15,857	55.0	+3.6
Labor	Jeff Shaw	10,601	36.8	−5.7
Democrats	Peter Chambers	2,387	8.3	+2.3
Total formal votes		28,845	97.7	
Informal votes		685	2.3	
Turnout		29,530	92.3	
Two-party-preferred result
Liberal	Jim Clough	16,857	59.7	+5.2
Labor	Jeff Shaw	11,401	40.3	−5.2
Liberal hold		Swing	+5.2	

=== Elizabeth ===
1981 New South Wales state election: Elizabeth
Party	Candidate	Votes	%	±%
Labor	Pat Hills	18,563	77.0	+4.6
Liberal	John Davison	3,420	14.2	−4.9
Communist	Aileen Beaver	2,115	8.8	+3.8
Total formal votes		24,098	93.4	
Informal votes		1,689	6.6	
Turnout		25,787	82.6	
Two-party-preferred result
Labor	Pat Hills	20,063	84.7	+3.3
Liberal	John Davison	3,620	15.3	−3.3
Labor notional hold		Swing	+3.3	

=== Fairfield ===
1981 New South Wales state election: Fairfield
Party	Candidate	Votes	%	±%
Labor	Janice Crosio	21,944	80.2	+4.8
Liberal	Robert Goninon	5,432	19.8	+1.9
Total formal votes		27,376	94.7	
Informal votes		1,532	5.3	
Turnout		28,908	90.2	
Labor hold		Swing	+1.8	

=== Georges River ===
1981 New South Wales state election: Georges River
Party	Candidate	Votes	%	±%
Labor	Frank Walker	17,368	60.9	−4.3
Liberal	Terence Morgan	7,692	27.0	−4.1
Independent	Phillip Gerlach	2,162	7.6	+7.6
Independent	Bruce Galloway	775	2.7	+2.7
Democrats	Wallace Burak	418	1.5	−2.2
Independent	Eric Stavely-Alexander	106	0.4	+0.4
Total formal votes		28,521	97.4	
Informal votes		752	2.6	
Turnout		29,273	93.5	
Two-party-preferred result
Labor	Frank Walker	17,568	69.0	+2.0
Liberal	Terence Morgan	7,892	31.0	−2.0
Labor hold		Swing	+2.0	

=== Gladesville ===
1981 New South Wales state election: Gladesville
Party	Candidate	Votes	%	±%
Labor	Rodney Cavalier	16,381	57.2	
Liberal	Ivan Petch	10,190	35.6	
Democrats	Robert Springett	2,065	7.2	
Total formal votes		28,636	96.7	
Informal votes		977	3.3	
Turnout		29,613	92.5	
Two-party-preferred result
Labor	Rodney Cavalier	16,881	60.1	−0.4
Liberal	Ivan Petch	11,190	39.9	+0.4
Labor notional hold		Swing	−0.4	

=== Gloucester ===
1981 New South Wales state election: Gloucester
Party	Candidate	Votes	%	±%
National Country	Leon Punch	19,261	60.2	
Labor	John Eastman	12,721	39.8	
Total formal votes		31,982	98.2	
Informal votes		578	1.8	
Turnout		32,560	93.7	
National Country hold		Swing	−5.4	

=== Gordon ===
1981 New South Wales state election: Gordon
Party	Candidate	Votes	%	±%
Liberal	Tim Moore	20,594	72.1	+2.9
Labor	George Doumanis	5,862	20.5	−3.4
Democrats	Ilse Robey	2,087	7.3	+0.4
Total formal votes		28,543	97.8	
Informal votes		631	2.2	
Turnout		29,174	90.4	
Two-party-preferred result
Liberal	Tim Moore	20,894	77.2	+3.2
Labor	George Doumanis	6,162	22.8	−3.2
Liberal hold		Swing	+3.2	

=== Gosford ===
1981 New South Wales state election: Gosford
Party	Candidate	Votes	%	±%
Labor	Brian McGowan	17,066	51.5	−5.9
Liberal	Andrew Fennell	13,419	40.5	+3.2
Democrats	Robert Bell	1,474	4.5	−0.4
Independent	Barry Phillips	639	1.9	+1.9
Independent	Paul Baker	522	1.6	+1.6
Total formal votes		33,120	97.7	
Informal votes		787	2.3	
Turnout		33,907	92.2	
Two-party-preferred result
Labor	Brian McGowan	18,066	56.8	−2.8
Liberal	Andrew Fennell	13,719	43.2	+2.8
Labor hold		Swing	−2.8	

=== Goulburn ===
1981 New South Wales state election: Goulburn
Party	Candidate	Votes	%	±%
National Country	Ron Brewer	14,999	51.8	
Labor	Robert Stephens	13,926	48.1	
Total formal votes		28,925	98.3	
Informal votes		509	1.7	
Turnout		29,434	92.9	
National Country hold		Swing	−0.5	

=== Granville ===
1981 New South Wales state election: Granville
Party	Candidate	Votes	%	±%
Labor	Pat Flaherty	19,188	72.0	+0.6
Liberal	Florence Maio	7,467	28.0	+9.3
Total formal votes		26,655	94.5	
Informal votes		1,547	5.5	
Turnout		28,202	91.1	
Labor hold		Swing	−6.6	

=== Hawkesbury ===
1981 New South Wales state election: Hawkesbury
Party	Candidate	Votes	%	±%
Liberal	Kevin Rozzoli	17,755	58.5	
Labor	Bennett Fienberg	10,317	34.0	
Independent	John Whittington	2,256	7.4	
Total formal votes		30,328	97.0	
Informal votes		930	3.0	
Turnout		31,258	89.7	
Two-party-preferred result
Liberal	Kevin Rozzoli	18,254	62.8	+4.2
Labor	Bennett Fienburg	10,833	37.2	−4.2
Liberal hold		Swing	+4.2	

=== Heathcote ===
1981 New South Wales state election: Heathcote
Party	Candidate	Votes	%	±%
Labor	Rex Jackson	18,771	67.3	−5.1
Liberal	Ron Phillips	6,609	23.7	+1.7
Independent	Maree Jamieson	1,310	4.7	+4.7
Democrats	Warren Evans	1,202	4.3	−1.3
Total formal votes		27,892	97.5	
Informal votes		714	2.5	
Turnout		28,606	93.4	
Two-party-preferred result
Labor	Rex Jackson	19,271	73.1	−2.1
Liberal	Ron Phillips	7,109	26.9	+2.1
Labor hold		Swing	−2.1	

=== Heffron ===
1981 New South Wales state election: Heffron
Party	Candidate	Votes	%	±%
Labor	Laurie Brereton	20,938	77.5	−2.5
Liberal	Carolyn O'Connor	6,094	22.5	+2.5
Total formal votes		27,032	94.8	
Informal votes		1,470	5.2	
Turnout		28,502	90.0	
Labor hold		Swing	−2.5	

=== Hornsby ===
1981 New South Wales state election: Hornsby
Party	Candidate	Votes	%	±%
Liberal	Neil Pickard	15,814	51.5	
Labor	Christopher Gorrick	13,507	44.0	
Democrats	John Haydon	996	3.2	
Independent	Timothy Daly	381	1.2	
Total formal votes		30,698	97.3	
Informal votes		845	2.7	
Turnout		31,543	92.9	
Two-party-preferred result
Liberal	Neil Pickard	16,314	53.8	+5.5
Labor	Christopher Gorrick	14,007	46.2	−5.5
Liberal notional gain from Labor		Swing	+5.5	

The sitting member was Neil Pickard (Liberal), however Hornsby had become notionally held by Labor due to the redistribution.

=== Hurstville ===
1981 New South Wales state election: Hurstville
Party	Candidate	Votes	%	±%
Labor	Kevin Ryan	16,053	57.3	−6.4
Liberal	Frederick Harvison	10,990	39.2	+2.9
Democrats	Frank Low	982	3.5	+3.5
Total formal votes		28,025	97.4	
Informal votes		749	2.6	
Turnout		28,774	91.7	
Two-party-preferred result
Labor	Kevin Ryan	16,353	59.2	−4.5
Liberal	Frederick Harvison	11,290	40.8	+4.5
Labor hold		Swing	−4.5	

=== Illawarra ===
1981 New South Wales state election: Illawarra
Party	Candidate	Votes	%	±%
Labor	George Petersen	20,094	69.1	+0.6
Liberal	Mervyn Lucke	4,574	15.7	−2.0
Democrats	James Kay	2,234	7.7	−6.1
Independent	Susan Sallans	2,193	7.5	+7.5
Total formal votes		29,095	95.0	
Informal votes		1,544	5.0	
Turnout		30,639	93.1	
Two-party-preferred result
Labor	George Petersen	21,787	79.6	+1.4
Liberal	Mervyn Lucke	5,587	20.4	−1.4
Labor hold		Swing	+1.4	

=== Ingleburn ===
1981 New South Wales state election: Ingleburn
Party	Candidate	Votes	%	±%
Labor	Stan Knowles	17,173	64.3	−7.7
Liberal	Gary Lucas	9,548	35.7	+7.7
Total formal votes		26,721	95.2	
Informal votes		1,354	4.8	
Turnout		28,075	89.9	
Labor notional hold		Swing	−7.7	

=== Kiama ===
1981 New South Wales state election: Kiama
Party	Candidate	Votes	%	±%
Labor	Bill Knott	17,951	59.9	
Liberal	James Chittick	11,995	40.1	
Total formal votes		29,946	97.1	
Informal votes		906	2.9	
Turnout		30,852	92.1	
Labor notional hold		Swing	−2.1	

=== Kogarah ===
1981 New South Wales state election: Kogarah
Party	Candidate	Votes	%	±%
Labor	Bill Crabtree	18,022	63.0	−4.9
Liberal	Patrick O'Brien	9,198	32.2	+0.1
Democrats	Albert Ost	1,374	4.8	+4.8
Total formal votes		28,594	97.2	
Informal votes		816	2.8	
Turnout		29,410	91.9	
Two-party-preferred result
Labor	Bill Crabtree	18,644	66.2	−1.7
Liberal	Patrick O'Brien	9,498	33.8	+1.7
Labor hold		Swing	−1.7	

=== Ku-ring-gai ===
1981 New South Wales state election: Ku-ring-gai
Party	Candidate	Votes	%	±%
Liberal	Nick Greiner	19,750	66.6	+1.1
Labor	Ian Cameron	6,970	23.5	−11.0
Democrats	Pamela Tuckwell	2,954	9.9	+9.9
Total formal votes		29,674	97.5	
Informal votes		764	2.5	
Turnout		30,438	90.7	
Two-party-preferred result
Liberal	Nick Greiner	20,550	70.8	+5.3
Labor	Ian Cameron	8,470	29.2	−5.3
Liberal hold		Swing	+5.3	

=== Lachlan ===
1981 New South Wales state election: Lachlan
Party	Candidate	Votes	%	±%
National Country	Ian Armstrong	16,538	58.7	+3.8
Labor	Timothy West	11,642	41.3	−3.8
Total formal votes		28,180	97.7	
Informal votes		672	2.3	
Turnout		28,852	92.4	
National Country notional hold		Swing	+3.8	

=== Lake Macquarie ===
1981 New South Wales state election: Lake Macquarie
Party	Candidate	Votes	%	±%
Labor	Merv Hunter	21,165	66.5	−4.7
Liberal	Judith Ball	7,716	24.2	−0.1
Democrats	Genady Levitch	2,968	9.3	+4.8
Total formal votes		31,849	97.7	
Informal votes		734	2.3	
Turnout		32,583	92.9	
Two-party-preferred result
Labor	Merv Hunter	22,134	71.7	−1.8
Liberal	Judith Ball	8,747	28.3	+1.8
Labor hold		Swing	−1.8	

=== Lakemba ===
1981 New South Wales state election: Lakemba
Party	Candidate	Votes	%	±%
Labor	Vince Durick	20,657	78.6	+3.7
Liberal	Vivian Salama	5,635	21.4	0.0
Total formal votes		26,292	95.4	
Informal votes		1,265	4.6	
Turnout		27,557	90.6	
Labor hold		Swing	+1.6	

=== Lane Cove ===
1981 New South Wales state election: Lane Cove
Party	Candidate	Votes	%	±%
Liberal	John Dowd	15,511	58.1	+5.9
Labor	Miron Shapira	8,464	31.7	−7.8
Democrats	Gary Smith	1,750	6.6	−1.7
Independent	Rhody Thomas	966	3.6	+3.6
Total formal votes		26,691	97.6	
Informal votes		646	2.4	
Turnout		27,337	89.4	
Two-party-preferred result
Liberal	John Dowd	16,511	64.1	+6.6
Labor	Miron Shapira	9,264	35.9	−6.6
Liberal hold		Swing	+6.6	

=== Lismore ===
1981 New South Wales state election: Lismore
Party	Candidate	Votes	%	±%
National Country	Bruce Duncan	20,848	68.9	+8.3
Labor	Alan Veacock	9,419	31.1	−2.0
Total formal votes		30,267	98.2	
Informal votes		555	1.8	
Turnout		30,822	91.7	
National Country hold		Swing	+5.1	

=== Liverpool ===
1981 New South Wales state election: Liverpool
Party	Candidate	Votes	%	±%
Labor	George Paciullo	19,733	76.5	−1.3
Liberal	Raymond Marsh	4,580	17.8	−1.6
Independent	David Bransdon	813	3.2	+3.2
Independent	Patrick Leyman	662	2.6	+2.6
Total formal votes		25,788	95.5	
Informal votes		1,214	4.5	
Turnout		27,002	90.7	
Two-party-preferred result
Labor	George Paciullo	20,033	80.4	−0.4
Liberal	Raymond Marsh	4,880	19.6	+0.4
Labor hold		Swing	−0.4	

=== Maitland ===
1981 New South Wales state election: Maitland
Party	Candidate	Votes	%	±%
Labor	Allan Walsh	15,663	53.0	+2.8
Liberal	Peter Toms	10,891	36.8	−13.0
Independent	Herbert Collins	1,832	6.2	+6.2
Independent	James Roberts	1,168	4.0	+4.0
Total formal votes		29,554	98.4	
Informal votes		465	1.6	
Turnout		30,019	94.5	
Two-party-preferred result
Labor	Allan Walsh	16,063	57.5	+7.2
Liberal	Peter Toms	11,891	42.5	−7.2
Labor notional hold		Swing	+7.2	

The sitting member was Peter Toms (Liberal), however Maitland had become notionally held by Labor due to the redistribution.

=== Manly ===
1981 New South Wales state election: Manly
Party	Candidate	Votes	%	±%
Labor	Alan Stewart	14,034	48.9	−2.5
Liberal	Nelson Meers	13,358	46.6	+2.9
Independent	Patricia Langworthy	1,284	4.5	+4.5
Total formal votes		28,676	97.6	
Informal votes		700	2.4	
Turnout		29,376	89.3	
Two-party-preferred result
Labor	Alan Stewart	14,600	51.2	−2.6
Liberal	Nelson Meers	13,893	48.8	+2.6
Labor hold		Swing	−2.6	

=== Maroubra ===
1981 New South Wales state election: Maroubra
Party	Candidate	Votes	%	±%
Labor	Bill Haigh	19,619	68.8	−1.5
Liberal	Mervyn Colbron	8,910	31.2	+6.0
Total formal votes		28,529	95.5	
Informal votes		1,336	4.5	
Turnout		29,865	90.9	
Labor hold		Swing	−3.7	

=== Marrickville ===
1981 New South Wales state election: Marrickville
Party	Candidate	Votes	%	±%
Labor	Tom Cahill	17,120	71.3	−2.9
Liberal	John Kekis	4,636	19.3	+0.4
Socialist	Christopher Taylor	1,533	6.4	−0.5
Democrats	Anthony Larkings	724	3.0	+3.0
Total formal votes		24,013	93.4	
Informal votes		1,703	6.6	
Turnout		25,716	87.4	
Two-party-preferred result
Labor	Tom Cahill	17,820	78.0	−1.8
Liberal	John Kekis	5,036	22.0	+1.8
Labor hold		Swing	−1.8	

=== Merrylands ===
1981 New South Wales state election: Merrylands
Party	Candidate	Votes	%	±%
Labor	Jack Ferguson	20,732	75.3	−1.1
Liberal	Alan Byers	6,794	24.7	+5.4
Total formal votes		27,526	95.3	
Informal votes		1,370	4.7	
Turnout		28,896	92.4	
Labor hold		Swing	−3.3	

=== Miranda ===
1981 New South Wales state election: Miranda
Party	Candidate	Votes	%	±%
Labor	Bill Robb	15,241	51.8	−1.7
Liberal	Lawrence Power	12,778	43.4	+1.9
Democrats	Richard Hopkins	1,407	4.8	−0.2
Total formal votes		29,426	97.7	
Informal votes		699	2.3	
Turnout		30,125	92.9	
Two-party-preferred result
Labor	Bill Robb	15,541	54.3	−2.2
Liberal	Lawrence Power	13,078	45.7	+2.2
Labor hold		Swing	−2.2	

=== Monaro ===
1981 New South Wales state election: Monaro
Party	Candidate	Votes	%	±%
Labor	John Akister	17,395	59.8	+3.4
Liberal	David Barton	8,852	30.4	+9.6
National Country	Susan Mitchell	2,384	8.2	−11.1
Independent	Christopher Kleiss	475	1.6	+1.6
Total formal votes		29,106	97.9	
Informal votes		621	2.1	
Turnout		29,727	89.8	
Two-party-preferred result
Labor	John Akister	17,495	61.4	+4.6
Liberal	David Barton	11,008	38.6	−4.6
Labor hold		Swing	+4.6	

=== Mosman ===
1981 New South Wales state election: Mosman
Party	Candidate	Votes	%	±%
Liberal	David Arblaster	17,187	64.2	+2.4
Labor	Richard Lancaster	9,572	35.8	−2.4
Total formal votes		26,759	97.1	
Informal votes		786	2.9	
Turnout		27,545	86.8	
Liberal hold		Swing	+2.4	

=== Murray ===
1981 New South Wales state election: Murray
Party	Candidate	Votes	%	±%
National Country	Tim Fischer	17,765	67.0	+67.0
Labor	Robert Allen	7,447	28.1	+3.4
Democrats	Gregory Butler	1,300	4.9	+4.9
Total formal votes		26,512	98.3	
Informal votes		445	1.7	
Turnout		26,957	87.6	
Two-party-preferred result
National Country	Tim Fischer	17,965	69.1	+5.0
Labor	Robert Allen	8,047	30.9	−5.0
National Country gain from Liberal		Swing	N/A	

=== Murrumbidgee ===
1981 New South Wales state election: Murrumbidgee
Party	Candidate	Votes	%	±%
Labor	Lin Gordon	15,865	53.5	
National Country	John Armstrong	7,320	24.7	
Independent	Thomas Marriott	6,483	21.8	
Total formal votes		29,668	98.5	
Informal votes		464	1.5	
Turnout		30,132	92.5	
Two-party-preferred result
Labor	Lin Gordon	17,365	63.9	+8.8
National Country	John Armstrong	9,820	36.1	−8.8
Labor hold		Swing	+8.8	

=== Newcastle ===
1981 New South Wales state election: Newcastle
Party	Candidate	Votes	%	±%
Labor	Arthur Wade	19,279	64.9	−3.8
Liberal	Alex Bevan	8,458	28.5	−2.8
Communist	Kay Wicks	1,987	6.7	+6.7
Total formal votes		29,724	96.4	
Informal votes		1,107	3.6	
Turnout		30,831	91.5	
Two-party-preferred result
Labor	Arthur Wade	20,708	70.9	+2.2
Liberal	Alex Bevan	8,508	29.1	−2.2
Labor hold		Swing	+2.2	

=== Northcott ===
1981 New South Wales state election: Northcott
Party	Candidate	Votes	%	±%
Liberal	Jim Cameron	19,173	61.3	+6.8
Labor	Therese McGee	10,322	33.0	−6.7
Democrats	Ian Irwin	1,763	5.6	−0.2
Total formal votes		31,258	97.3	
Informal votes		879	2.7	
Turnout		32,137	91.7	
Two-party-preferred result
Liberal	Jim Cameron	19,682	64.1	+6.7
Labor	Therese McGee	11,002	35.9	−6.7
Liberal hold		Swing	+6.7	

=== Northern Tablelands ===
1981 New South Wales state election: Northern Tablelands
Party	Candidate	Votes	%	±%
Labor	Bill McCarthy	15,474	52.9	+4.8
National Country	John Tregurtha	13,782	47.1	−4.8
Total formal votes		29,256	98.4	
Informal votes		468	1.6	
Turnout		29,724	92.2	
Labor notional gain from National Country		Swing	+4.8	

=== North Shore ===
1981 New South Wales state election: North Shore
Party	Candidate	Votes	%	±%
Liberal	Bruce McDonald	10,359	41.6	−12.2
Independent	Ted Mack	7,163	28.7	+28.7
Labor	Maurice May	7,036	28.2	−18.0
Democrats	Norman Ward	362	1.5	+1.5
Total formal votes		24,920	97.8	
Informal votes		559	2.2	
Turnout		25,479	84.1	
Two-candidate-preferred result
Independent	Ted Mack	13,130	54.6	+54.6
Liberal	Bruce McDonald	10,936	45.4	−8.4
Independent notional gain from Liberal		Swing	+54.6	

=== Orange ===
1981 New South Wales state election: Orange
Party	Candidate	Votes	%	±%
National Country	Garry West	15,555	53.5	+1.8
Labor	Harold Gartrell	13,504	46.5	−1.8
Total formal votes		29,059	98.1	
Informal votes		567	1.9	
Turnout		29,626	93.3	
National Country hold		Swing	+1.8	

=== Oxley ===
1981 New South Wales state election: Oxley
Party	Candidate	Votes	%	±%
National Country	Jim Brown	20,358	61.5	−1.0
Labor	Alick Rogers	12,754	38.5	+1.0
Total formal votes		33,112	98.0	
Informal votes		684	2.0	
Turnout		33,796	93.2	
National Country hold		Swing	−1.0	

=== Parramatta ===
1981 New South Wales state election: Parramatta
Party	Candidate	Votes	%	±%
Labor	Barry Wilde	15,517	56.7	
Liberal	Paul Zammit	7,131	26.1	
Independent	Anthony Buhagiar	4,008	14.6	
Democrats	Barry Jacques	713	2.6	
Total formal votes		27,369	96.3	
Informal votes		1,054	3.7	
Turnout		28,423	89.2	
Two-party-preferred result
Labor	Barry Wilde	17,517	65.7	−0.6
Liberal	Paul Zammit	9,131	34.3	+0.6
Labor hold		Swing	−0.6	

=== Peats ===
1981 New South Wales state election: Peats
Party	Candidate	Votes	%	±%
Labor	Keith O'Connell	18,046	64.5	−3.8
Liberal	Raymond Carter	7,014	25.0	+0.7
Democrats	John Aitken	2,937	10.5	+7.2
Total formal votes		27,997	96.3	
Informal votes		1,082	3.7	
Turnout		29,079	91.3	
Two-party-preferred result
Labor	Keith O'Connell	19,060	70.4	−0.4
Liberal	Raymond Carter	8,014	29.6	+0.4
Labor hold		Swing	−0.4	

=== Penrith ===
1981 New South Wales state election: Penrith
Party	Candidate	Votes	%	±%
Labor	Peter Anderson	22,850	70.8	−1.2
Liberal	Ross Shuttleworth	9,413	29.2	+1.2
Total formal votes		32,263	96.9	
Informal votes		1,038	3.1	
Turnout		33,301	92.2	
Labor hold		Swing	−1.2	

=== Pittwater ===
1981 New South Wales state election: Pittwater
Party	Candidate	Votes	%	±%
Liberal	Max Smith	16,910	60.9	+14.9
Labor	Patrick Sewell	10,872	39.1	−1.5
Total formal votes		27,782	96.2	
Informal votes		1,087	3.8	
Turnout		28,869	88.4	
Liberal hold		Swing	+9.5	

=== Riverstone ===
1981 New South Wales state election: Riverstone
Party	Candidate	Votes	%	±%
Labor	Tony Johnson	18,139	71.1	
Liberal	Kenneth Jessup	6,267	24.6	
Democrats	John Cavenett	1,090	4.3	
Total formal votes		25,496	94.6	
Informal votes		1,452	5.4	
Turnout		26,948	90.1	
Two-party-preferred result
Labor	Tony Johnson	18,339	73.9	−5.7
Liberal	Kenneth Jessup	6,467	26.1	+5.7
Labor notional hold		Swing	−5.7	

=== Rockdale ===
1981 New South Wales state election: Rockdale
Party	Candidate	Votes	%	±%
Labor	Brian Bannon	18,639	69.2	
Liberal	John Tonkin	8,294	30.8	
Total formal votes		26,933	96.1	
Informal votes		1,094	3.9	
Turnout		28,027	91.4	
Labor hold		Swing	−2.5	

=== Ryde ===
1981 New South Wales state election: Ryde
Party	Candidate	Votes	%	±%
Labor	Garry McIlwaine	15,570	57.0	
Liberal	Donald Wilkinson	10,160	37.2	
Democrats	Christopher Dunkerley	1,588	5.8	
Total formal votes		27,318	96.4	
Informal votes		1,032	3.6	
Turnout		28,350	90.6	
Two-party-preferred result
Labor	Garry McIlwaine	15,870	60.3	−3.4
Liberal	Donald Wilkinson	10,460	39.7	+3.4
Labor notional hold		Swing	−3.4	

=== St Marys ===
1981 New South Wales state election: St Marys
Party	Candidate	Votes	%	±%
Labor	Ron Mulock	22,820	77.5	−2.4
Liberal	Rodney Field	6,615	22.5	+2.4
Total formal votes		29,435	95.9	
Informal votes		1,271	4.1	
Turnout		30,706	90.6	
Labor notional hold		Swing	−2.4	

=== Seven Hills ===
1981 New South Wales state election: Seven Hills
Party	Candidate	Votes	%	±%
Labor	Bob Christie	17,290	64.8	
Liberal	Heather Gow	7,237	27.1	
Democrats	Peggy Cable	2,146	8.1	
Total formal votes		26,673	95.9	
Informal votes		1,145	4.1	
Turnout		27,818	91.8	
Two-party-preferred result
Labor	Bob Christie	17,690	70.0	−7.1
Liberal	Heather Gow	7,587	30.0	+7.1
Labor notional hold		Swing	−7.1	

=== South Coast ===
1981 New South Wales state election: South Coast
Party	Candidate	Votes	%	±%
Independent	John Hatton	unopposed		
Independent hold				

=== Swansea ===
1981 New South Wales state election: Swansea
Party	Candidate	Votes	%	±%
Labor	Don Bowman	22,375	71.2	−7.5
Liberal	Denis Dolan	4,976	15.8	−5.5
Democrats	Lyn Godfrey	4,060	12.9	+12.9
Total formal votes		31,411	96.4	
Informal votes		1,187	3.6	
Turnout		32,598	93.2	
Two-party-preferred result
Labor	Don Bowman	23,276	78.8	+0.1
Liberal	Denis Dolan	6,276	21.2	−0.1
Labor notional hold		Swing	+0.1	

=== Tamworth ===
1981 New South Wales state election: Tamworth
Party	Candidate	Votes	%	±%
National Country	Noel Park	17,504	58.4	+8.8
Labor	Garrett Ryan	10,689	35.7	−6.6
Democrats	Noel Cassel	1,782	5.9	0.0
Total formal votes		29,975	98.0	
Informal votes		596	2.0	
Turnout		30,571	93.0	
Two-party-preferred result
National Country	Noel Park	18,384	62.1	+8.8
Labor	Garrett Ryan	11,229	37.9	−8.8
National Country hold		Swing	+8.8	

=== The Hills ===
1981 New South Wales state election: The Hills
Party	Candidate	Votes	%	±%
Liberal	Fred Caterson	17,284	59.5	+7.3
Labor	Barry Calvert	10,124	34.8	−8.3
Democrats	Rona Samuels	1,660	5.7	+1.0
Total formal votes		29,068	97.7	
Informal votes		696	2.3	
Turnout		29,764	91.8	
Two-party-preferred result
Liberal	Fred Caterson	17,584	61.7	+6.9
Labor	Barry Calvert	10,924	38.3	−6.9
Liberal hold		Swing	+6.9	

=== Tuggerah ===
1981 New South Wales state election: Tuggerah
Party	Candidate	Votes	%	±%
Labor	Harry Moore	17,724	59.1	
Liberal	Joan Skaife	8,883	29.6	
Democrats	Lynn Sawyer	3,382	11.3	
Total formal votes		29,989	97.3	
Informal votes		817	2.7	
Turnout		30,806	91.0	
Two-party-preferred result
Labor	Harry Moore	19,108	66.8	−3.2
Liberal	Joan Skaife	9,503	33.2	+3.2
Labor notional hold		Swing	−3.2	

=== Upper Hunter ===
1981 New South Wales state election: Upper Hunter
Party	Candidate	Votes	%	±%
National Country	Col Fisher	16,640	56.4	+2.0
Labor	Ronald Brumpton	12,886	43.6	−2.0
Total formal votes		29,526	98.0	
Informal votes		589	2.0	
Turnout		30,115	92.8	
National Country hold		Swing	+2.0	

=== Vaucluse ===
1981 New South Wales state election: Vaucluse
Party	Candidate	Votes	%	±%
Liberal	Rosemary Foot	16,840	64.6	
Labor	Nance Loney	6,529	25.0	
Independent	Mark Ure	1,602	6.1	
Democrats	Brian Hillman	1,112	4.3	
Total formal votes		26,083	96.2	
Informal votes		1,018	3.8	
Turnout		27,101	86.3	
Two-party-preferred result
Liberal	Rosemary Foot	17,600	70.1	+7.9
Labor	Nance Loney	7,500	29.9	−7.9
Liberal hold		Swing	+7.9	

=== Wagga Wagga ===
1981 New South Wales state election: Wagga Wagga
Party	Candidate	Votes	%	±%
Liberal	Joe Schipp	15,351	51.3	−0.8
Labor	Thomas Watson	11,287	37.7	−6.8
Democrats	Rodney Dominish	3,270	10.9	+10.9
Total formal votes		29,908	98.5	
Informal votes		457	1.5	
Turnout		30,365	92.1	
Two-party-preferred result
Liberal	Joe Schipp	16,351	58.1	+4.3
Labor	Thomas Watson	11,787	41.9	−4.3
Liberal hold		Swing	+4.3	

=== Wakehurst ===
1981 New South Wales state election: Wakehurst
Party	Candidate	Votes	%	±%
Labor	Tom Webster	14,891	55.3	−0.8
Liberal	Phillip Wearne	11,194	41.6	−2.3
Democrats	Henri Rathgeber	837	3.1	+3.1
Total formal votes		26,922	97.0	
Informal votes		833	3.0	
Turnout		27,755	90.0	
Two-party-preferred result
Labor	Tom Webster	15,098	57.0	+0.9
Liberal	Phillip Wearne	11,394	43.0	−0.9
Labor hold		Swing	+0.9	

=== Wallsend ===
1981 New South Wales state election: Wallsend
Party	Candidate	Votes	%	±%
Labor	Ken Booth	21,392	74.3	−5.0
Liberal	Richard Noonan	7,387	25.7	+5.0
Total formal votes		28,779	97.3	
Informal votes		789	2.7	
Turnout		29,568	94.5	
Labor hold		Swing	−5.0	

=== Waratah ===
1981 New South Wales state election: Waratah
Party	Candidate	Votes	%	±%
Labor	Sam Jones	20,407	70.2	−2.4
Liberal	Pauline Graham	7,484	25.7	+1.6
Communist	Christopher Dodds	1,199	4.1	+0.9
Total formal votes		29,047	97.7	
Informal votes		687	2.3	
Turnout		29,734	94.8	
Two-party-preferred result
Labor	Sam Jones	21,107	73.6	−2.0
Liberal	Pauline Graham	7,574	26.4	+2.0
Labor hold		Swing	−2.0	

=== Waverley ===
1981 New South Wales state election: Waverley
Party	Candidate	Votes	%	±%
Labor	Ernie Page	16,796	61.9	−3.7
Liberal	Albert Ross	10,350	38.1	+10.7
Total formal votes		27,146	95.2	
Informal votes		1,375	4.8	
Turnout		28,521	85.8	
Labor hold		Swing	−6.9	

=== Wentworthville ===
1981 New South Wales state election: Wentworthville
Party	Candidate	Votes	%	±%
Labor	Ernie Quinn	17,182	62.6	
Liberal	Colin Edwards	10,279	37.4	
Total formal votes		27,461	96.0	
Informal votes		1,157	4.0	
Turnout		28,618	93.5	
Labor hold		Swing	−4.5	

=== Willoughby ===
1981 New South Wales state election: Willoughby
Party	Candidate	Votes	%	±%
Liberal	Peter Collins	13,185	49.9	
Labor	Eddie Britt	11,370	43.0	
Independent	Kenneth Thomas	1,880	7.1	
Total formal votes		26,435	96.9	
Informal votes		856	3.1	
Turnout		27,291	89.0	
Two-party-preferred result
Liberal	Peter Collins	13,902	53.7	+1.5
Labor	Eddie Britt	12,004	46.3	−1.5
Liberal notional hold		Swing	+1.5	

The sitting member was Eddie Britt (Labor), however Willoughby had become notionally held by Liberal due to the redistribution.

=== Wollongong ===
1981 New South Wales state election: Wollongong
Party	Candidate	Votes	%	±%
Labor	Eric Ramsay	13,223	46.5	−22.9
Independent	Frank Arkell	11,767	41.4	+41.4
Liberal	Ronald Brooks	2,346	8.2	−13.0
Democrats	Megan Sampson	974	3.4	−3.9
Independent	Ellen Love	142	0.5	+0.5
Total formal votes		28,452	96.0	
Informal votes		1,185	4.0	
Turnout		29,637	91.9	
Two-candidate-preferred result
Labor	Eric Ramsay	14,034	50.1	−23.7
Independent	Frank Arkell	13,983	49.9	+49.9
Labor hold		Swing	−23.7	

=== Woronora ===
1981 New South Wales state election: Woronora
Party	Candidate	Votes	%	±%
Labor	Maurie Keane	18,646	62.1	−4.5
Liberal	Chris Downy	11,405	37.9	+13.0
Total formal votes		30,051	97.6	
Informal votes		734	2.4	
Turnout		30,785	93.8	
Labor hold		Swing	−7.5	

== See also ==
- Results of the 1981 New South Wales state election (Legislative Council)
- Candidates of the 1981 New South Wales state election
- Members of the New South Wales Legislative Assembly, 1981–1984
