= 1911 Maitland state by-election =

Election result for Maitland, New South Wales, Australia

A by-election was held for the New South Wales Legislative Assembly electorate of Maitland on 28 October 1911, following the death of John Gillies (Independent Liberal).

== Dates ==
Date	Event
23 September 1911	John Gillies died.
14 October 1911	Writ of election issued by the Speaker of the Legislative Assembly.
20 October 1911	Day of nomination
28 October 1911	Polling day
14 November 1911	Return of writ

== Result ==
1911 Maitland by-election Saturday 28 October
Party	Candidate	Votes	%	±%
Liberal Reform	Charles Nicholson	3,701	56.1	
Labour	Laurence Vial	2,902	43.9	+7.8
Total formal votes		6,603	99.0	+0.8
Informal votes		147	1.0	−0.8
Turnout		6,668	78.8 (Note: estimate based on an electoral roll of 8,457 at the 1910 election.)	+8.9
Liberal Reform gain from Independent Liberal		Swing	N/A	

== See also ==
- Electoral results for the district of Maitland
- List of New South Wales state by-elections
