= Walter O'Hearn =

Walter O'Hearn may refer to:

- Walter O'Hearn (Australian politician) 1890–1950), member of the New South Wales Legislative Assembly
- Walter D. O'Hearn (1910–1969), Canadian journalist
- Walter J. A. O'Hearn (1879–1933), barrister and political figure in Nova Scotia, Canada
