= John Price (New South Wales politician) =

Australian politician

The Honourable John Price AM JP

1st Deputy Speaker of the Legislative Assembly
- In office 11 May 1999 – 2 March 2007
- Speaker: John Murray; John Aquilina
- Preceded by: New title
- Succeeded by: Tony Stewart

Member of the New South Wales Legislative Assembly for Maitland
- In office 27 March 1999 – 24 March 2007
- Preceded by: Peter Blackmore
- Succeeded by: Frank Terenzini

Member of the New South Wales Legislative Assembly for Waratah
- In office 24 March 1984 – 27 March 1999
- Preceded by: Sam Jones
- Succeeded by: District abolished

Alderman of the City of Newcastle
- In office 17 September 1977 – April 1984

Personal details
- Born: 14 May 1939 (age 87) Mayfield, New South Wales, Australia
- Died: 13 October 2026 (aged 87)
- Party: Labor Party
- Spouse: Elizabeth Price

John Charles Price (14 May 1939 – 13 October 2026) was an Australian politician, elected as a member of the New South Wales Legislative Assembly from 1984 to his retirement in 2007, including as the first Deputy Speaker of the Legislative Assembly from 1999 to 2007.

== Early life and career ==
Price was born in Mayfield, New South Wales and was educated at Mayfield East Public School and Newcastle Technical High School. Price later obtained certificates in marine engineering technology and structural engineering from Newcastle Technical College before gaining a second class certificate of engineering competency (steam) from the Commonwealth Department of Shipping and Transport. Price began a fitter and machinist apprenticeship with the State Dockyard in 1956 before spending many years as a draughtsman, marine engineer and manager in the shipbuilding industry.

== Political career ==
Price was first elected as an Alderman of the Newcastle City Council in 1977 to 1984. He also served as a Newcastle delegate Councillor on Shortland County Council (1977–1980).

Price represented Waratah from 1984 to 1999 and Maitland from 1999 to 2007 for the Labor Party. Price served on various committees, including as Chairman of the Standing Committee on Ethics (1999–2007) and as Chairman of the Parliamentary Committee for Centenary of Federation Celebration (1999–2001), for which he received the Centenary Medal. He was the first Deputy Speaker from 1999 to 2007, which replace the position of Chairman of Committees which he had held since 1995. Price retired at the March 2007 election.

== Later life and honours ==
Price was made a Member of the Order of Australia (AM) in the 2009 Australia Day Honours List for "service to the Parliament of New South Wales, and to the community through executive roles with youth, educational, church and broadcasting organisations."

Price was a longstanding Member of the Council of the University of Newcastle, serving as a Parliamentary appointee from 1984 to 1991 and 1995 to 2004 and from 2004 to 2014 as a City Council nominee. Price later served as Deputy Chancellor of the university and was acting Chancellor from October 2012 to June 2013 after the death in office of Chancellor Dr Ken Moss. Price retired as Deputy Chancellor in March 2014 and the University Council in May 2014. In November 2014, the University of Newcastle awarded him with an honorary degree of Doctor of Letters (Hon.D.Litt.).

Price died on 13 October 2026.

New South Wales Legislative Assembly
Preceded by Sam Jones	Member for Waratah; 1984–1999	District abolished
Preceded by Peter Blackmore	Member for Maitland; 1999–2007	Succeeded by Frank Terenzini
Preceded by John Turner	Chairman of Committees; 1995–1999	Replaced by Deputy Speaker
New title	Deputy Speaker of the Legislative Assembly; 1999–2007	Succeeded by Tony Stewart
