= Frank Terenzini =

Australian politician

Member of the New South Wales Parliament for Maitland
- In office 24 March 2007 – 26 March 2011
- Preceded by: John Price
- Succeeded by: Robyn Parker

Personal details
- Born: Francesco Terenzini; 19 August 1961 (age 64) Newcastle, New South Wales, Australia
- Party: Labor Party
- Spouse: Susan Terenzini
- Children: Angela and Katherine
- Occupation: Member of Parliament

Francesco "Frank" Terenzini (Italian: [franˈtʃesko terenˈtsiːni]; born 19 August 1961) is a former Australian politician. He was a Labor Party member of the New South Wales Legislative Assembly from 2007 until 2011, representing the electorate of Maitland. He was a lawyer and teacher before entering politics.

Terenzini was born 19 August 1961 at Newcastle to Giuseppe and Angela Terenzini. He attended public schools in the Hunter Valley. He left school at 16 to become an apprentice boilermaker at the BHP Newcastle Steelworks. He later completed an apprenticeship as a motor mechanic and spent the next 10 years in the motor repair industry, eventually becoming motor vehicle inspector with the Roads & Traffic Authority. He went on to teach apprentices at TAFE and eventually obtained a Diploma in Teaching from the University of Technology, Sydney.

He continued his studies and became interested in law. He studied at Macquarie University externally and was awarded a Bachelor of Legal Studies (B.Leg.S) On 30 June 1994, he was admitted as a solicitor of the Supreme Court of New South Wales. He worked in private practice as a solicitor and also in the Office of the Director of Public Prosecutions. He worked as a prosecutor for 10 years.

In 2007, he stood for election for the Legislative Assembly of New South Wales for the electorate of Maitland. His main competitors for the seat were Bob Geoghegan Liberal and Mayor of the Maitland and former Member for Maitland, Peter Blackmore as an Independent. Terenzini narrowly won Maitland with 19,989 votes (51.98%) to Blackmore's 18,463 (48.02%) after preferences.

He served as a Member of the Standing Committee on Parliamentary Privilege and Ethics from 2007 to 2010 and was the chair of the committee on the Independent Commission Against Corruption from 2007 to 2010.

== Ministerial career ==
On 21 May 2010 Terenzini was appointed to the frontbench as Minister for Small Business, Minister Assisting the Premier on Veterans' Affairs and Minister for Housing. He served until his retirement at the 2011 election.

== Personal life ==
He is married to Susan Terenzini and they have two daughters; Angela and Katherine. His interests include restoring vintage cars, Labor Party history and Australian history.

New South Wales Legislative Assembly
Preceded by John Price	Member for Maitland; 2007–2011	Succeeded by Robyn Parker
