= Jenny Aitchison =

Australian politician

The Honourable Jenny Aitchison MP
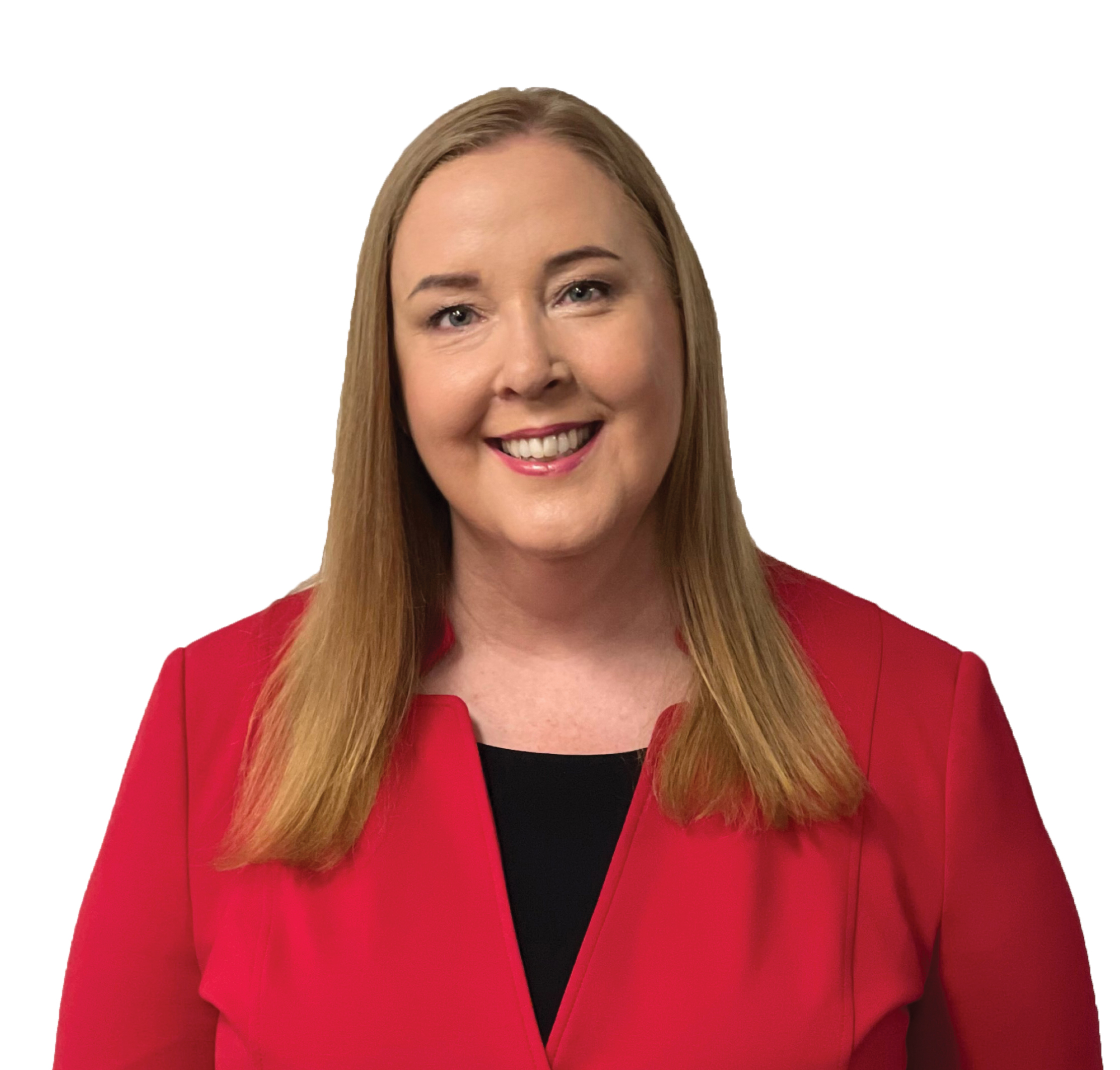

Minister for Roads Minister for Regional Transport
- Incumbent
- Assumed office 17 March 2025
- Premier: Chris Minns
- Preceded by: John Graham (as Minister for Roads); Herself (as Minister for Regional Transport and Roads)

Minister for Regional Transport and Roads
- In office 5 April 2023 – 17 March 2025
- Premier: Chris Minns
- Preceded by: Sam Farraway
- Succeeded by: Herself (as Minister for Roads and Minister for Regional Transport)

Member of the New South Wales Parliament for Maitland
- Incumbent
- Assumed office 28 March 2015
- Preceded by: Robyn Parker

Personal details
- Born: Canberra, Australian Capital Territory
- Party: Labor
- Spouse: Robert Aitchison
- Children: 2
- Education: Australian National University; University of Canberra; University of Sydney
- Occupation: Public servant, tourism and hospitality manager
- Website: www.jennyaitchison.com.au

Jennifer Kathleen Aitchison is an Australian politician who has served as Minister for Roads and Minister for Regional Transport in the Minns ministry since 2025. She previously served as Minister for Regional Transport and Roads from 2023 to 2025. She is a member of the Labor Party.

She has served in the New South Wales Legislative Assembly as the member for Maitland since the 2015 New South Wales state election. Before her election, Aitchison worked as a managing director of tourism and hospitality companies.

== Early years and background ==
Aitchison was born in Canberra, Australian Capital Territory, to Jim and Anne O'Connor, a library officer in the Commonwealth Public Service and also one of the first women to receive paid maternity leave for the birth of Jenny. Aitchison, at around eight years old, started to follow in her mother's footsteps and commenced working at her local library as a volunteer.

In 1985, during the first International Year of Youth, Aitchison was selected to represent her school on an interschool newspaper, which is where she later said was "the start of my activism".

=== Early career ===
At 21 years of age, in 1992, Aitchison joined the Australian Labor Party and later that year joined the Commonwealth Public Service (CPS) in the Department of Immigration and Ethnic Affairs, an experience where she has later said was "sad yet ultimately hopeful [hearing the] stories of the many thousands of people who had unsuccessfully applied to come to Australia as refugees or migrants. I read with a sense of deep shame and embarrassment a question from an overseas school student to the Minister, asking if it was really true that Australia had once had a policy that we would only let people with white skin into Australia". Aitchison then moved into the Social Justice Coordination Section; responsibilities here included drafting the department's Agenda for Women and consultations around Australia, in addition to hearing firsthand the stories of many refugee and migrant women.

=== Tourism and hospitality career ===
Aitchison was also managing director of tourism company Northern Highland Travel Pty Ltd, where she operated package coach tours across the region. At its peak, the company employed 35 employees and undertook tours all over Australia, specialising in providing unique tours showcasing regional and remote destinations and events.

Working in the tourism and hospitality industries, Aitchison has won approximately 20 local, regional, state and national tourism and business awards, including the NSW Tourism Awards three years in a row. In 2003, her company was inducted into the Tourism NSW Hall of Fame. In 2006, Aitchison won the BusNSW and the Bus Industry Confederation's National Young Achiever Award and her business was a finalist in the Telstra Business Awards. In 2005, Aitchison was awarded the Lower Hunter Business Woman of the Year.

== Political career ==
=== Pre-political activism ===
In 2005, Vicki Woods and Bronwyn Ridgway founded the non-party political Women's Network, Hunter NSW with the aim of increasing the number of women participating in decision-making roles in the community. At the time, there were no females representing Maitland at the State or Federal level and only two female councillors on Maitland City Council. Woods and Ridgway asked Aitchison to be the Foundation President of the organisation, which she went on to lead for seven years. On the resignation of Woods as Secretary, Aitchison then took on the role for an additional two years.

=== 2015: Member for Maitland ===
Aitchison was elected as member for Maitland at the 2015 New South Wales election with a vote of 63%, beating incumbent Robyn Parker on a swing of +18.8 points. Following the election, she was elected as the NSW Chair of Commonwealth Women Parliamentarians (CWP) and was elected as deputy chair of the CWP National Steering Committee in 2016.

In March 2016, Jodie Harrison resigned from the shadow ministry. Aitchison was promoted to replace her in the shadow cabinet and was appointed as Shadow Minister for the Prevention of Domestic Violence and Sexual Assault, and Shadow Minister for Small Business.

=== 2019: re-election and (Shadow) Minister for Regional Transport and Roads ===
At the 2019 New South Wales election, Aitchison was re-elected with a first-preference vote increase of +1.79 points, but the overall two-party vote suffered a small swing of −0.62 points against her this was likely due to 8 candidates contesting the seat. During the 2019 ALP NSW Leadership contest, Aitchison supported new leader Jodi McKay and following the shadow ministry reshuffle was promoted to Shadow Minister for Investment and Tourism, Medical Research, and Primary Industries.

Following the appointment of Chris Minns as the Leader of the Opposition in June 2021, Aitchison was designated as the Shadow Minister for Regional Transport and Roads.

=== 2023: Minister for Regional Transport and Roads ===
In March 2023, the Minns Labor Government took office. Aitchison retained the regional transport and roads portfolio.

=== 2025: Minister for Roads and Minister for Regional Transport ===
On 17 March 2025, Aitchison was sworn in as Minister for Roads and Minister for Regional Transport. As Minister for Roads, Aitchison has prioritised road safety.

== Personal life ==
In 1997, Aitchison met her husband, Robert, and relocated to Walcha, a small town in the New England Tableland. In 1999, her family was honoured with an Australia Day award for their contribution to tourism in Walcha. The following year, in 2000, Aitchison moved to Maitland with six-week-old son Joshua.

During 2010, Jenny faced significant health challenges, including the discovery of the BRCA2 gene mutation, which increased her risk of developing breast cancer. She underwent a double mastectomy and the removal of both ovaries, entering surgical menopause. In February 2025, Aitchison joined James O'Doherty from the Daily Telegraph for a 'High Steaks' interview where among other things, she revealed her "humiliating" phobia of dogs.

New South Wales Legislative Assembly
Preceded by Robyn Parker	Member for Maitland; 2015–present	Incumbent
Political offices
Preceded by Sam Farraway	Minister for Regional Transport and Roads; 2023–2025	Succeeded by Herself
Preceded by John Graham	Minister for Roads; 2025–present	Incumbent
Preceded by Herself	Minister for Regional Transport; 2025–present	Incumbent
