= Robyn Parker =

Australian politician

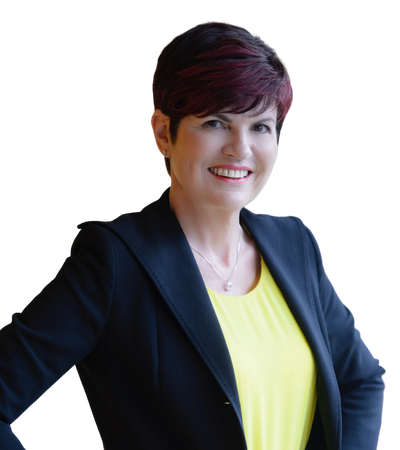

Member of the New South Wales Parliament for Maitland
- In office 26 March 2011 – 28 March 2015
- Preceded by: Frank Terenzini
- Succeeded by: Jenny Aitchison

Minister for the Environment
- In office 3 April 2011 – 23 April 2014
- Premier: Barry O'Farrell
- Preceded by: Frank Sartor
- Succeeded by: Rob Stokes

Minister for Heritage
- In office 3 April 2011 – 23 April 2014
- Premier: Barry O'Farrell
- Preceded by: Tony Kelly
- Succeeded by: Rob Stokes

Member of the Legislative Council of New South Wales
- In office 22 March 2003 – 26 March 2011

Personal details
- Born: 3 August 1958 (age 68)
- Party: Liberal Party
- Spouse: David Parker
- Occupation: Teacher and childcare worker

Robyn Mary Parker (born 3 August 1958) is an Australian former politician. She was a member of the New South Wales Legislative Assembly representing Maitland for the Liberal Party from 2011 to 2015 and was previously a member of the Legislative Council of New South Wales between 2003 and 2011. Parker was the New South Wales Minister for the Environment and the Minister for Heritage in the O'Farrell government from 2011 until April 2014. Parker was succeeded by Rob Stokes in the Baird cabinet.

== Early years and background ==
Parker was born to parents, Adeline and Campbell McEwen. Her family has its origins in the dairy farming district of Taranaki, New Zealand. She studied at the Palmerston North Teachers' College at Massey University, New Zealand and obtained a Diploma of Teaching. She subsequently worked as a development officer with a focus on Children's Services for the City of Sunshine between 1979 and 1980; a Family Day Care Co-ordinator for the City of Oakleigh between 1981 and 1982, and for Queensland Centacare between 1982 and 1983. After moving to Maitland in the mid-1980s, she was the Co-ordinator of a mobile resource service between 1984 and 1995 and she also taught child studies for TAFE between 1985 and 1992. At Maitland, she developed one of the first mobile community outreach programs for that city.

Her interest in politics became evident in 1999, when she became a political advisor to Senator John Tierney but left in November 2001 to become a manager at a skin cancer centre in Lake Macquarie. At the clinic she developed and implemented a program to encourage women to take leadership positions within politics, particularly the Liberal party.

Parker was the Vice-President of the Liberal Party of New South Wales in 1997–2000, and was the president of the NSW Women's Council in 2000–2003. As head of the Liberal Women's Forum, she supported the training and mentoring of women in all levels of Government and initiated the Pathways to Political Leadership Programme.

== Political career ==
=== Ministerial career ===
As Minister for the Environment, Parker has sought to increase penalties for pollution and develop an independent Environment Protection Authority. She pursued a science-based approach to recovery of threatened species and secured additional funding for these programs.

During Parker's ministry, the EPA also introduced an energy and waste policy aimed at business recycling across NSW, and programs to reduce the amount of waste going to landfill. In three years as heritage minister Parker delivered a record number of Maitland buildings to the state heritage register including Maitland's Jewish Cemetery.

During her time as Minister for the Environment, Parker also oversaw the creation of the most comprehensive air quality network in Australia Securing the International World Parks Congress for Sydney in November 2014, greater support for Taronga Zoo's conservation program, the introduction of legislation banning solaria, making NSW the second in the world to do so (a lead other states have followed) and provided increased funding for community, local government, not for profit and aboriginal heritage projects throughout New South Wales.

Parker and the Environment Protection Authority received a lot of criticism following a hexavalent chromium emission at Orica's ammonium nitrate plant in Newcastle in August 2011;. Parker refused to apologise for why there was a delay in informing the public of the spill claiming she was left off of a crucial departmental email. The Sydney Morning Herald reported " It was also reported that there was a pattern going back more than a decade with 32 documented serious pollution incidents in New South Wales since 1999 in which companies failed to notify authorities within 24 hours. Parker has been criticised for not notifying the public about the incident until Thursday afternoon, three days later, despite being informed on Wednesday evening." The Parliamentary report showed that Parker was notified about the incident by the Office of Environment and Heritage on 10 August 2011 at 4.23pm. In the morning of 11 August 2011, the Premier's Chief of Staff was notified by Parker's office and Parker informed the parliament at 3:30pm. It was reported that Parker received media training from journalist John Mangos to handle the crisis. The head of Orica claimed he tried to contact Parker about the spill three times with no success. Parker responded "The time for Orica to contact the Government and environmental authorities was as soon as the Kooragang Island leak occurred – not seven days later". In November 2011, NSW Opposition Leader John Robertson called on the Premier to sack Parker saying "the job of a minister is to take responsibility for protecting the community and from day one, Ms Parker has clearly failed to live up to that standard". An upper house inquiry into the Orica incident was released in February 2012, the inquiry's report stated "The delay by the Minister for the Environment in informing the public regarding the leak, whether by press statement, ministerial statement or other means, was unacceptable" The inquiry also stated "in this instance Minister Parker's actions led to a great deal of political debate ultimately increasing public concern and confusion about the leak."

Immediately after the Orica incident the Government held an independent inquiry with an independent chairperson. Brendan O'Reilly, the former director general of the NSW Premier's department. O'Reilly's report stated that "The public were exposed to the media reporting of the political debate with claims and counter claims being made. This resulted in increased concerns and confusion in the minds of the public."

On 11 October 2011, Parker introduced the Protection of the Environment Legislation Amendment Bill into the Parliament aimed at strengthening the ability of the Environment Protection Authority to regulate serious pollution incidents by significantly improving notification requirements and pollution incident response management provisions and increase penalties for non-compliance. The Bill was passed on 13 October 2011.

In a budget estimates hearing in 2011, Parker stated "logging protects koalas." In reference to this quote, Parker stated "[It] doesn't help koalas you know, this was a heated exchange," and "I was interrupted continuously and so I've missed a couple of words out in one sentence." Opposition environment spokesperson Luke Foley said that Parker had broken her government's promise of protecting koalas. Foley also said "Robyn Parker is allowing a national icon to be endangered thanks to her 'unsound ecological approach' "

In one of her last acts as Minister for Environment, Parker launched a master plan for Royal Botanic Gardens, Sydney. The plan was seen as controversial and criticised by the opposition and former Australian of the Year Ian Kiernan as commercialisation of the gardens. Former Prime Minister Paul Keating also criticised the plan saying "While the government is spending a lot of money on a cultured headland park at Barangaroo to the west, the same government, with the authority of environment minister Robyn Parker, is spending money to destroy the gardens to the east".

In 2014, Rob Stokes succeeded Parker as the new Minister for the Environment in Premier Mike Baird's cabinet. Despite being endorsed as the candidate for the seat of Maitland, Parker announced her retirement from Parliament and did not contest the election held in March 2015.

=== Legislative Council ===
Parker was first touted as a Liberal candidate in 2000 However, she had to wait until 2002 to be pre-selected for the fifth position on the Liberal ticket, and was the seventh person elected on the combined Liberal/National ticket.

Parker was elected to the Legislative Council in 2003. Parker delivered her Inaugural speech on 20 May 2003. During her time in Parliament Parker chaired a number of high-profile inquiries, including the Operation and Management of the NSW Ambulance Service, the Bullying of Children and Young People, and the Building the Education Revolution. She also served as the Shadow Parliamentary Secretary for Education and Aboriginal Affairs and was Chair of the NSW Opposition's Hunter Taskforce.

In 2004 she spoke on the debate of the Criminal Procedure Amendment Sexual Offences Bill in the New South Wales Parliament. She supported the introduction of closed circuit television for victims to give their evidence in court as she had been a victim when she was nineteen in New Zealand. In the debate she pointed out the different standards that apply to rape victims compared to other victims of crime. She said that if "an assailant held you at knifepoint, asked you for your wallet and you complied, there is no question that a crime was committed. You would not be asked if you consented. You would not be asked if you had tried to resist. Only survivors of sexual assault are asked these questions."

Parker delivered her Valedictory Speech on 2 December 2010.

Parker decided to seek election to the Legislative Assembly to fulfil a desire to become involved in politics at a more local level and was elected as the first female Member for Maitland in March 2011 Parker was appointed Minister for Environment and Minister for Heritage in April 2011.

=== Legislative Assembly ===
On 19 February 2010, Parker was pre-selected by the Liberal Party to contest the semi-marginal Lower House seat of Maitland. At the 2011 election, Parker was elected with a swing of 20.3 per cent and won the seat with 56.3 per cent of the two-party vote. Her main competitor was the incumbent sitting member, Labor's Frank Terenzini.

In her inaugural speech to the Parliament Parker noted her aspirations as a member of the Liberal party to follow the lead of Menzies who named the party as a party of long-term vision, progressive rather than reactionary. Parker delivered her inaugural speech on 3 May 2011.

Parker lobbied and achieved funding for a complete school rebuild for Hunter River Community School.

=== Post Political Career ===
After leaving parliament Parker resumed her career in community services. In 2015 Parker was appointed as Chief Executive Officer ageing and disability services, Delphis Australia. Parker has been appointed as a non-executive director to a number of not-for-profit and government boards including: Taronga Conservation Society, NextSense (formerly Royal Institute For Deaf And Blind Children), Hume Community Housing, Hunter Local Land Services, The Heritage Council of New South Wales.

== Personal life ==
Parker is married to David and has three children Dylan, Chelsea and Heath and two stepchildren Ben and Tim. Her husband stood for the seat of Newcastle in the 2003 election.

Parker told parliament in 2004 that she had been raped as a teenager and nailed her bedroom windows shut in the aftermath. In 2009, it was revealed that her eldest son, Dylan, then aged 22, made and flew paper planes and had become one of the world's best, while simultaneously dealing with the sudden discovery of a brain tumour. His story was broadcast in an episode of the ABC TV program Australian Story.

New South Wales Legislative Assembly
Preceded by Frank Terenzini	Member for Maitland; 2011–2015	Succeeded by Jenny Aitchison
Political offices
Preceded by Frank Sartor	Minister for the Environment; 2011–2014	Succeeded by Rob Stokes
Preceded by Tony Kelly	Minister for Heritage; 2011–2014	Succeeded by Rob Stokes
