= Peter Blackmore (politician) =

Australian politician

Peter Blackmore OAM
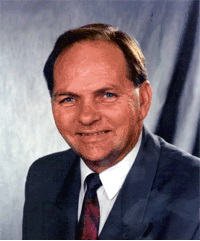

Member of the New South Wales Parliament for Maitland
- In office 25 May 1991 – 5 March 1999
- Preceded by: Allan Walsh
- Succeeded by: John Price

Mayor of Maitland
- In office 11 September 1999 – 9 September 2017
- Preceded by: Ron Eagle as Administrator; Henry Meskauskas as Mayor
- Succeeded by: Loretta Baker
- In office 1987 - 1990
- Preceded by: Patrick J Hughes
- Succeeded by: Ray Fairweather

Personal details
- Born: Peter Terrence Blackmore; 11 February 1945 (age 81) Newcastle, New South Wales
- Party: Independent
- Other political affiliations: Liberal
- Occupation: Salesman

Peter Terrence Blackmore OAM (born 11 February 1945) is an Australian politician, he was a member of the New South Wales Legislative Assembly, representing Maitland since from 1991 to 1999. He also served as Mayor of the City of Maitland from 1986 to 1990, and then from 1999 to 2017.

Born to George and Kathleen Blackmore, he attended Newcastle Technical High School and became a salesman, covering fields such as real estate and catering. From 1974 to 1990, he owned a service station. Blackmore has two daughters with his second wife, Lynette Ruth Steel. He also has two sons Rodney and Simon peter with his first wife.

In 1986 he was elected Mayor of Maitland, a position he held until 1990, and was reelected to the position of Mayor in September 1999 before concluding his term in 2017. In 1991 he was elected to the New South Wales Legislative Assembly for the seat of Maitland as a member of the Liberal Party. He held the seat until his defeat by Labor member for Waratah John Price in 1999.

Blackmore contested the seat as an independent after Price's retirement at the 2007 state election, but was narrowly defeated by Labor candidate Frank Terenzini.

New South Wales Legislative Assembly
Preceded by Allan Walsh	Member for Maitland; 1991 – 1999	Succeeded by John Price
