= Walter Howarth =

Australian politician

Member of the New South Wales Parliament for Maitland
- In office 11 June 1932 – 6 February 1956
- Preceded by: Walter O'Hearn
- Succeeded by: Milton Morris

Personal details
- Born: 14 March 1882 Campbelltown, Colony of New South Wales
- Died: 12 July 1958 (aged 76) Maitland, New South Wales, Australia
- Party: United Australia (1932—1945); Liberal Party (1945—1958)
- Spouse: Edith Letitia Margaret Langlands
- Children: Two sons, three daughter
- Profession: Politician/ Building contractor

Walter Arthur Harrex Howarth (14 March 1882 – 12 July 1958) was an Australian politician who represented the Maitland for the United Australia Party (1932–1945) and the Liberal Party (1945–1956). He was deputy leader of the New South Wales Liberal Party from 1946 to 1954.

== Early life ==
Howarth was born to parents Walter Arthur Howarth, a bootmaker, and Elizabeth Ellen Peetwn at Campbelltown. Howarth jnr Married Edith Letitia Margaret Langlands on 3 February 1906 at Lidcombe and had five children through their marriage: three daughters and two sons. He was a building contractor and a carpenter by trade.

== Political career ==
Howarth first entered politics in 1926 as a Councillor of Bolwarra Shire until 1932, during which he was Shire President for one term. He contested the New South Wales Lower House seat of Maitland for the United Australia Party and won election on 11 June 1932.

Howarth was re-elected to the seat of Maitland at the 1935, 1938, 1941, 1944, 1947, 1950 and 1953. Whilst a member of Parliament Howarth was party Whip from 1941 until 1946 and was Deputy Leader of the New South Wales Division of the Liberal Party from 1946 until 1954 under Leader Sir Vernon Treatt.

== Death ==
Howarth died on 12 July 1958. His funeral was held at Beresfield crematorium from Mackay Memorial Presbyterian church ministers at Rutherford.

New South Wales Legislative Assembly
Preceded by Walter O'Hearn	Member for Maitland; 1932 – 1956	Succeeded by Milton Morris
Party political offices
Preceded by Vernon Treatt	Deputy Leader of the New South Wales Liberal Party; 1946 – 1954	Succeeded by Robert Askin
