= Charles Edward Nicholson =

Australian politician

Charles Edward Nicholson VD (1854 – 24 September 1931) was an Australian politician.

He was born in West Maitland to grazier William Nicholson and Mary Ann Ryan. He was a solicitor's clerk before joining the Newcastle post office in 1876, soon rising to assistant postmaster and then postmaster in 1880. From 1882 he was crown lands agent at Coonabarabran; he resigned in 1888 to return to Maitland to farm. He served in the Boer War as a captain and was mentioned in despatches three times. He was elected to the New South Wales Legislative Assembly in 1911 as the Liberal member for Maitland. During World War I he served with the Hunter River Lancers and the Australian Light Horse as a major and then on Sea Transport staff from 1916 to 1917 as a lieutenant colonel. He was defeated in 1920, and after another unsuccessful run in 1925 retired from politics. Nicholson died in Maitland in 1931.

New South Wales Legislative Assembly
Preceded by John Gillies	Member for Maitland; 1911–1920	Succeeded by Walter Bennett; William Cameron; Walter O'Hearn
