= Electoral district of Maitland =

State electoral district of New South Wales, Australia

Maitland New South Wales—Legislative Assembly
- Interactive map of district boundaries from the 2023 state election
- State: New South Wales
- Dates current: 1904–present
- MP: Jenny Aitchison
- Party: Labor Party
- Namesake: Maitland
- Electors: 60,409 (2023)
- Area: 391.74 km^{2} (151.3 sq mi)
- Demographic: Provincial
Electorates around Maitland:
Upper Hunter	Upper Hunter	Port Stephens
Cessnock	Maitland	Port Stephens
Cessnock	Cessnock	Wallsend

Maitland is an electoral district of the Legislative Assembly in the Australian state of New South Wales.

The district encompasses most of the City of Maitland.

== History ==
Maitland was created in 1904, replacing East Maitland and West Maitland. With the introduction of proportional representation in 1920, it absorbed parts of Upper Hunter, Singleton, Cessnock and Durham and elected three members. With the end of proportional representation in 1927, Maitland was split into the single-member electorates of Maitland, Upper Hunter and Cessnock.

== Members for Maitland ==
(1904–1920, 1 member)
Member	Party	Term
John Gillies	Progressive	1904–1907
John Gillies	Liberal Reform	1907–1910
John Gillies	Independent Liberal	1910–1911
Charles Edward Nicholson	Liberal Reform	1911–1917
Charles Edward Nicholson	Nationalist	1917–1920

(1920–1927. 3 members)
Member	Party	Term	Member	Party	Term	Member	Party	Term
Walter Bennett	Progressive	1920–1922	William Cameron	Nationalist	1920–1927	Walter O'Hearn	Labor	1920–1927
Walter Bennett	Nationalist	1922–1927	William Cameron	Nationalist	1920–1927	Walter O'Hearn	Labor	1920–1927

(1927–present, 1 member)
Member	Party	Term
Walter O'Hearn	Labor	1927–1932
Walter Howarth	United Australia	1932–1945
Walter Howarth	Liberal	1945–1956
Milton Morris	Liberal	1956–1980
Peter Toms	Liberal	1981–1981
Allan Walsh	Labor	1981–1991
Peter Blackmore	Liberal	1991–1999
John Price	Labor	1999–2007
Frank Terenzini	Labor	2007–2011
Robyn Parker	Liberal	2011–2015
Jenny Aitchison	Labor	2015–present

== Election results ==
2023 New South Wales state election: Maitland
Party	Candidate	Votes	%	±%
Labor	Jenny Aitchison	26,792	51.9	+6.6
Liberal	Michael Cooper	11,745	22.7	−2.6
One Nation	Neil Turner	4,404	8.5	−2.7
Greens	Campbell Knox	3,725	7.2	+1.1
Legalise Cannabis	Daniel Dryden	2,906	5.6	+5.6
Independent	Alex Lee	1,200	2.3	+2.3
Sustainable Australia	Sam Ferguson	861	1.7	+0.1
Total formal votes		51,633	96.5	+0.5
Informal votes		1,890	3.5	−0.5
Turnout		53,523	88.6	−0.8
Two-party-preferred result
Labor	Jenny Aitchison	30,647	68.6	+3.9
Liberal	Michael Cooper	14,012	31.4	−3.9
Labor hold		Swing	+3.9	
