= Walter O'Hearn (Australian politician) =

Australian politician

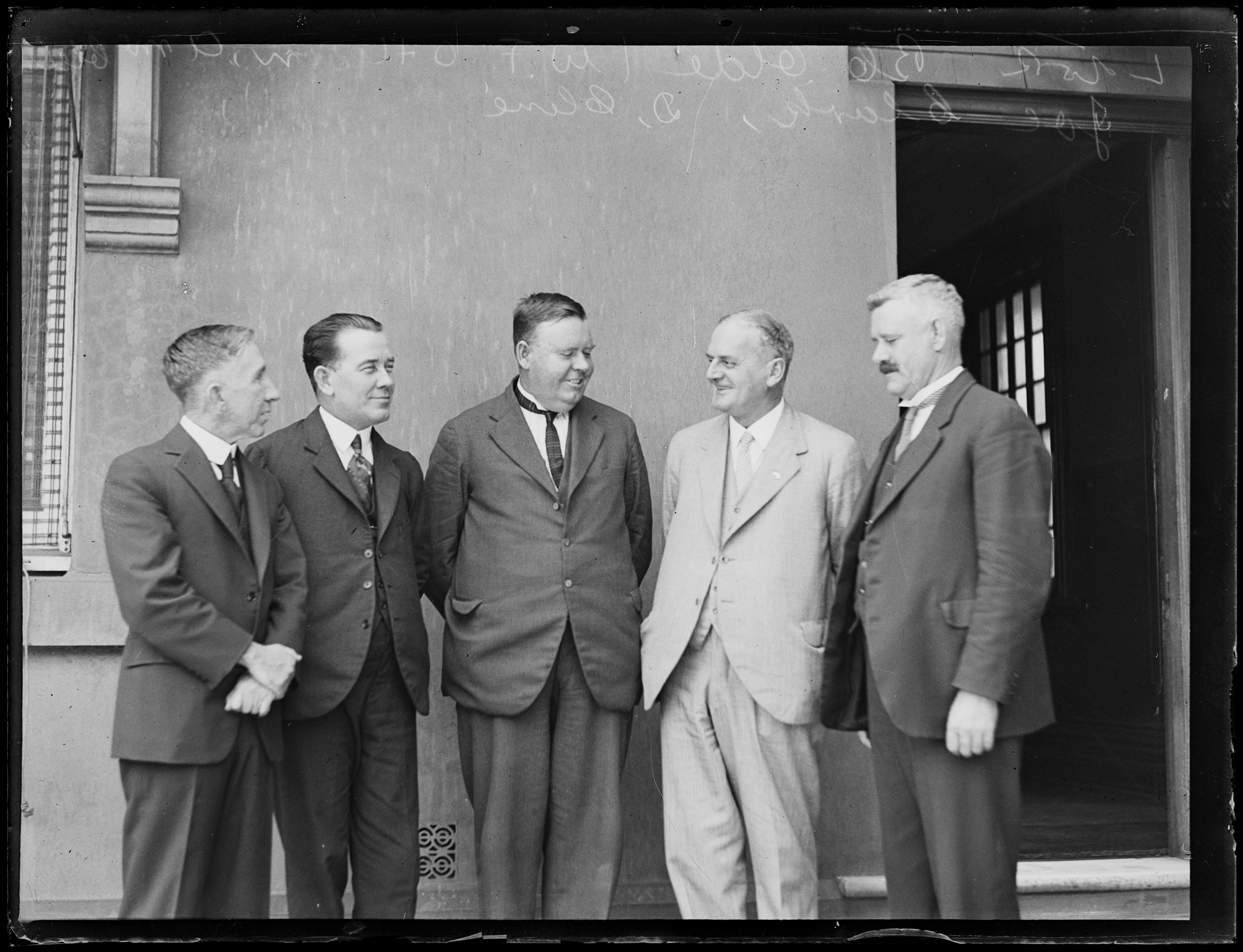
O'Hearn (second from left) with fellow Labor MPs Barney Olde, Alf McClelland, Joe Clark and Daniel Clyne

Walter Finlay O'Hearn (16 October 1890 – 16 September 1950) was an Australian politician, elected as a member of the New South Wales Legislative Assembly.

O'Hearn was born in West Maitland and educated to primary level. He worked at East Greta mine, but lost an arm and leg in pit-top accident. He became a poultry farmer and was later secretary of a small mining company at Louth Park. He married Catherine Ellen Walsh in 1918 and they had three daughters and two sons.

O'Hearn was elected as a Labor Party member for the Maitland in 1920 and retained the seat until 1932. He died in Maitland.

== Notes ==
New South Wales Legislative Assembly
Preceded by Charles Nicholson	Member for Maitland; 1920 – 1932; Served alongside: Bennett/None, Cameron/None	Succeeded by Walter Howarth
