= Milton Morris =

Australian politician (1924–2019)

The Honourable Milton Morris AO

Minister for Transport
- In office 13 May 1965 – 3 January 1975
- Premier: Sir Robert Askin
- Preceded by: John McMahon
- Succeeded by: Wal Fife

Member of the New South Wales Parliament for Maitland
- In office 3 March 1956 – 29 August 1980
- Preceded by: Walter Howarth
- Succeeded by: Peter Toms

Personal details
- Born: Milton Arthur Morris; 2 April 1924 Mayfield, New South Wales
- Died: 27 February 2019 (aged 94) Mayfield, New South Wales
- Party: Liberal Party
- Spouse: Colleen Joan Burgess
- Children: One son, three daughters
- Awards: Officer of the Order of Australia; Officer of the Order of Polonia Restituta (Poland)

Military service
- Allegiance: Australia
- Branch/service: Royal Australian Navy (1942); Australian Army (1942–45)
- Years of service: 1942–1945
- Rank: Private
- Unit: Volunteer Defence Corps
- Battles/wars: Second World War

Milton Arthur Morris AO (2 April 1924 – 27 February 2019) was an Australian politician who represented the Electoral district of Maitland between 3 March 1956 and 29 August 1980 for the Liberal Party. He helped pass several laws promoting automobile safety.

== Early life ==
He was born in April 1924 at Mayfield, New South Wales, to Arthur Henry Morris, a railway guard, and his wife Janet Thomson. He was educated at Wickham Public School and Newcastle Junior Boys High School. Morris briefly joined the Royal Australian Navy in 1942 before transferring to the part-time Volunteer Defence Corps, where he served as an anti-aircraft gunner from 1942 until 1945. He married Colleen Joan Burgess on 13 October 1945. They had one son and three daughters.

== Political career ==
Morris joined the Liberal Party in 1954 and was a member of the Tarro Branch of the Party. He was a Councillor on the Lower Hunter Shire (1954–1958). With the retirement of Incumbent member for Maitland, Walter Howarth, Morris was preselected by the Liberal Party and won the seat at that election. He subsequently won re-election at the 1956, 1959, 1962, 1965, 1968, 1971, 1973, 1976 and 1978 New South Wales State elections.

During his political career Morris held various portfolios in the Askin Government, Lewis Government and Willis Government including Minister for Transport (1965–1975). During his tenure of that portfolio, he introduced the breathalyser, radar speed traps, compulsory wearing of seat belts and a number of other road-safety initiatives partly though his formation of the scientifically-based Traffic Accident Research Unit, led by Dr Michael Henderson. He was also Minister for Lands, Minister for Forests (1975–1975) and Minister for Decentralisation and Development (1976–1976).

On 25 June 1972 in Sydney's The Sun-Herald newspaper, an article by motoring journalist, television commentator and successful rally driver Evan Green entitled "160 MPH 'Super Cars' Soon" about proposed high powered V8 engined cars from Holden, Ford and Chrysler Australia that were being developed for the annual Bathurst 500 mile race would and soon be on sale to the Australian public, quoted Morris as saying that he was appalled at these cars—which he labelled "bullets on wheels". This article and Morris' comment would set in motion the so-called Supercar scare which would see the V8 powered Holden LJ Torana GTR XU-1, Ford Falcon GTHO Phase IV and the Chrysler Valiant Charger scrapped by their respective manufacturers.

He resigned from his seat of Maitland on 29 August 1980 to contest the New South Wales Federal Seat of Lyne for the Liberal Party. The Lyne contest was a three cornered contest between the Labor Party candidate, National Country Party candidate Bruce Cowan and himself. The results of the 1980 Lyne election were close with Morris coming within 2.9% of out voting his National Country opponent and winning through preferences against the Labor candidate in a heavily conservative seat. On his departure from parliament, he was permitted by Queen Elizabeth II, on the Governor's recommendation, to continue to use the title "The Honourable".

== Later life ==
Morris had not contested any election since his Lyne campaign. In a 2008 interview with the Maitland Mercury it was noted that he had the nickname 'Mr Maitland'. In the interview he claimed that he had no regrets about not re-entering politics, but did say that if given the chance would jump at it. "I loved every minute of it [being Transport Minister]". Morris died in his sleep on 27 February 2019.

== Community activity and honours ==
- Chairman of Hunter Valley Training.
- Honorary Chairman of Lewis House Apprentice Hostel, Mayfield
- Patron of East Maitland sub branch, Returned Serviceman's League.
- Patron – The Mai-Wel Group.
- Patron – Waratah Brass
- Inaugural Inductee of the City of Maitland Hall of Fame
- Honorary Prefect of Hunter Christian School (formerly Mayfield Christian Community School)
- Patron - Sydney Heritage Fleet (1965-1986)

=== Honours ===
- Officer of the Order of Australia (AO) – 1988, for his contribution to politics, youth and the community.
- Officer's Cross of the Order of Polonia Restituta (Poland) – 1989, for service to Poland and its people.

New South Wales Legislative Assembly
Preceded by Walter Howarth	Member for Maitland; 1956–1980	Succeeded by Peter Toms
Political offices
Preceded by John McMahon	Minister for Transport; 1965–1975	Succeeded by Wal Fife
Preceded by Tom Lewis	Minister for Lands; 1975	Succeeded by John Mason
New title	Minister for Forests; 1975	Succeeded by John Mason
Preceded by Tim Bruxner	Minister for Decentralisation and Development; 1976	Succeeded by Don Day
