= Peter Toms (politician) =

Australian soldier and politician (1933–2017)

Peter Toms OAM

Member of the New South Wales Parliament for Maitland
- In office 21 February 1981 – 28 August 1981
- Preceded by: Milton Morris
- Succeeded by: Allan Walsh

Personal details
- Born: 30 August 1933 Collarenebri, New South Wales, Australia
- Died: 1 November 2017 (aged 84) Belmont, New South Wales, Australia
- Party: Liberal Party
- Spouse: Joan Pead (div. 1991)
- Children: One son, four daughters
- Occupation: Politician

Peter Macquarie Toms OAM (30 August 1933 – 1 November 2017) was an Australian politician who represented the Electoral district of Maitland between 21 February 1981 and 28 August 1981 for the Liberal Party.

== Early life and military ==
Born to parents Septimus Frank Toms, a postmaster, and Ninian Florence Toms in Collarenebri, New South Wales, Australia. He was the great-grandson of former member for Hastings and Manning, Joseph Andrews.

Toms was educated at Goulburn Infants School, Bombala Primary School, Hurlstone Agricultural High School and Hemingway Robertson Institute. He worked as a Clerk in Commonwealth Bank of Australia from 1949 until 1955 and as a Clerk in his Local Government Shire from 1955 until 1982. Toms served in Wauchope, Stroud and Dungog.

=== Military career ===
Toms has an extended Military career including: Citizens Military Forces/ Army Reserve 1952 – 1979, National service full time training in 1952, Commissioned as a Lieutenant, Parachutist Rifle Company Commander in 1955 and promoted to a Captain 1957. He served in units including the 17/18th Infantry Battalion North Shore Regiment, 2nd Infantry Battalion, City of Newcastle regiment, 13th Infantry Battalion the Macquarie regiment and 2nd Battalion Royal New South Wales Regiment. He was also a trained parachutist and proudly wore his wings on his sleeves.

Toms was attached to 5RAR on loan from 2RNSWR in Phuc Tuy Province Viet Nam. CMF officers of the rank of Captain and above were offered short term posting to Vietnam to gain experience in this theatre of operations. On 12 March 1969, whilst on patrol with an infantry unit, he was wounded to the head/shoulder and back from an RPG airburst in bamboo when the unit was ambushed by Viet Cong irregulars. He along with three other soldiers was evacuated by helicopter to the Australian Military Hospital in Vung Tau. He was later repatriated to Australia. Toms was the only serving member of the CMF to be wounded in Vietnam.

== Political career ==
Originally a branch member of the Country Party, Toms joined the Dungog branch of the Liberal Party in 1979.

Toms was elected as the member for the Electoral district of Maitland at the 1981 Maitland state by-election. He represented the seat for a total of six months and eight days.

== Personal life ==
He divorced wife Joan on 15 March 1991.

=== Community activity ===
- Defence Reserves Association
- Battle for Australia – Newcastle Committee
- Newcastle City Council Ex-service Remembrance Committee
- Wallsend Returned Serviceman's Leagues Club sub branch
- Vietnam Veterans Federation
- Fort Scratchley Historical Society
- Hunter Region Botanic Gardens
- Lord Baden Powell Society and;
- President and founding secretary/event organiser in 1998 for Reserve Forces Day Hunter Region Council.

=== Honours ===
- Medal of the Order of Australia (OAM) – 2002, for "service to the community of Newcastle, particularly through the Reserve Forces Day Newcastle Regional Council, and through local government".

New South Wales Legislative Assembly
| Preceded by Milton Morris | Member for Maitland; Feb-Sep 1981 | Succeeded by Allan Walsh |
