= Allan Walsh (Australian politician) =

Australian politician

Allan Peter Walsh (13 August 1940 – 17 September 2013) was an Australian politician. He was the Labor member for Maitland in the New South Wales Legislative Assembly from 1981 to 1991.

Born in Maitland, Walsh attended Manly Boys' High School and Sydney Technical College before receiving a Bachelor of Arts form the University of Newcastle and a Diploma of Education from the Newcastle College of Advanced Education. He served as a fighter pilot in the RAAF 1962–70, and was then a teacher at Newcastle and Maitland Technical College. On 3 September 1966 he married Marcia, with whom he had two children.

In 1981, when the local state Liberal MP for Maitland resigned, Walsh was selected as the Labor candidate to contest the by-election. He was narrowly defeated by the Liberal candidate Peter Toms. However, the 1981 redistribution made Maitland a solid Labor seat and Walsh easily defeated Toms in the state election later the same year. He was nearly defeated in 1988, surviving by 444 votes, and when the 1991 redistribution gave the seat a 7.4% Liberal margin, Walsh retired from politics.

New South Wales Legislative Assembly
Preceded by Peter Toms	Member for Maitland; 1981–1991	Succeeded by Peter Blackmore
