= Electoral results for the district of Tamworth =

Election results for Tamworth, New South Wales, Australia

Tamworth, an electoral district of the Legislative Assembly in the Australian state of New South Wales, has had two incarnations from 1890 until 1920 and from 1927 until the present. It initially returned two members until 1894 and has since returned a single member for all subsequent elections.

== Members ==
First incarnation (1880–1920)
Election	Member	Party	Member	Party
1880	Robert Levien	None	Sydney Burdekin	None
1882	Robert Levien	None	John Gill	None
1885	Robert Levien	None	Michael Burke	None
1887	Robert Levien	Protectionist	William Dowel	Protectionist
1889 by	Robert Levien	Protectionist	William Dowel	Protectionist
1891	Robert Levien	Protectionist	William Dowel	Protectionist
1894	George Dibbs	Protectionist		
1895	Albert Piddington	Free Trade		
1898	William Sawers	Protectionist		
1901	Raymond Walsh	Independent		
1903 by	John Garland	Liberal Reform		
1904	Robert Levien	Progressive		
1907	Robert Levien	Former Progressive		
1910	Robert Levien	Independent Liberal		
1913	Frank Chaffey (Note: Bill Chaffey was the son of former member Frank Chaffey.)	Farmers and Settlers		
1917	Frank Chaffey	Nationalist		
Second incarnation (1927–present)
Election	Member	Party		
1927	Frank Chaffey	Nationalist		
1930	Frank Chaffey	Nationalist		
1932	Frank Chaffey	United Australia		
1935	Frank Chaffey	United Australia		
1938	Frank Chaffey	United Australia		
1940 by	Bill Chaffey	United Australia		
1941	Bill Chaffey	Independent		
1944	Bill Chaffey	Independent		
1947	Bill Chaffey	Country		
1950	Bill Chaffey	Country		
1953	Bill Chaffey	Country		
1956	Bill Chaffey	Country		
1959	Bill Chaffey	Country		
1962	Bill Chaffey	Country		
1965	Bill Chaffey	Country		
1968	Bill Chaffey	Country		
1971	Bill Chaffey	Country		
1973	Noel Park	Country		
1976	Noel Park	Country		
1978	Noel Park	National Country		
1981	Noel Park	National Country		
1984	Noel Park	National		
1988	Noel Park	National		
1991	Tony Windsor	Independent		
1995	Tony Windsor	Independent		
1999	Tony Windsor	Independent		
2001 by	John Cull	National		
2003	Peter Draper	Independent		
2007	Peter Draper	Independent		
2011	Kevin Anderson	National		
2015	Kevin Anderson	National		
2019	Kevin Anderson	National		
2023	Kevin Anderson	National		

== Election results ==
=== Elections in the 2020s ===
==== 2023 ====
2023 New South Wales state election: Tamworth
Party	Candidate	Votes	%	±%
National	Kevin Anderson	27,333	51.7	−1.8
Independent	Mark Rodda	10,418	19.7	+4.0
Labor	Kate McGrath	6,864	13.0	+3.8
Shooters, Fishers, Farmers	Matthew Scanlan	3,705	7.0	−9.8
Greens	Ryan Brooke	1,786	3.4	+0.6
Legalise Cannabis	Sue Raye	1,554	2.9	+2.9
Informed Medical Options	Rebecca McCredie	887	1.7	+1.7
Sustainable Australia	Colin Drain	328	0.6	+0.5
Total formal votes		52,875	97.5	−0.3
Informal votes		1,374	2.5	+0.3
Turnout		54,249	89.3	−1.4
Notional two-party-preferred count
National	Kevin Anderson	32,433	74.2	−3.8
Labor	Kate McGrath	11,292	25.8	+3.8
Two-candidate-preferred result
National	Kevin Anderson	29,998	65.8	−5.0
Independent	Mark Rodda	15,601	34.2	+5.0
National hold		Swing	−5.0	

=== Elections in the 2010s ===
==== 2019 ====
2019 New South Wales state election: Tamworth
Party	Candidate	Votes	%	±%
National	Kevin Anderson	27,855	55.07	+0.00
Independent	Mark Rodda	8,283	16.38	+16.38
Shooters, Fishers, Farmers	Jeff Bacon	8,180	16.17	+16.17
Labor	Steve Mears	4,133	8.17	+2.40
Greens	Robin Gunning	1,367	2.70	+0.57
Animal Justice	Emma Hall	760	1.50	+1.50
Total formal votes		50,578	97.80	+0.11
Informal votes		1,136	2.20	−0.11
Turnout		51,714	91.12	−1.07
Two-party-preferred result
National	Kevin Anderson	32,700	79.47	+0.53
Labor	Steve Mears	8,448	20.53	−0.53
Two-candidate-preferred result
National	Kevin Anderson	30,522	71.11	+11.07
Independent	Mark Rodda	12,403	28.89	−11.07
National hold		Swing	+11.07	

==== 2015 ====
2015 New South Wales state election: Tamworth
Party	Candidate	Votes	%	±%
National	Kevin Anderson	26,990	55.1	+0.9
Independent	Peter Draper	16,855	34.4	–4.2
Labor	Joe Hillard	2,831	5.8	+1.2
Greens	Pat Schultz	1,047	2.1	+0.6
Christian Democrats	Michelle Ryan	655	1.3	+1.3
No Land Tax	Richard Nock	319	0.7	+0.7
	Stan Heuston	314	0.6	+0.6
Total formal votes		49,011	97.7	−0.5
Informal votes		1,156	2.3	+0.5
Turnout		50,167	92.2	+0.6
Notional two-party-preferred count
National	Kevin Anderson	30,783	78.9	−1.8
Labor	Joe Hillard	8,215	21.1	+1.8
Two-candidate-preferred result
National	Kevin Anderson	27,777	60.0	+3.2
Independent	Peter Draper	18,491	40.0	−3.2
National hold		Swing	+3.2	

==== 2011 ====
2011 New South Wales state election: Tamworth
Party	Candidate	Votes	%	±%
National	Kevin Anderson	25,235	55.0	+14.7
Independent	Peter Draper	17,237	37.6	−8.7
Labor	Paul Hobbs	2,167	4.7	−3.9
Greens	Dheera Smith	722	1.6	+0.4
Independent	Tony Gibson	510	1.1	+1.1
Total formal votes		45,871	98.5	−0.3
Informal votes		699	1.5	+0.3
Turnout		46,570	94.6	
Notional two-party-preferred count
National	Kevin Anderson	30,688	80.6	+5.7
Labor	Paul Hobbs	7,388	19.4	−5.7
Two-candidate-preferred result
National	Kevin Anderson	25,680	57.8	+12.5
Independent	Peter Draper	18,786	42.2	−12.5
National gain from Independent		Swing	+12.5	

=== Elections in the 2000s ===
==== 2007 ====
2007 New South Wales state election: Tamworth
Party	Candidate	Votes	%	±%
Independent	Peter Draper	20,531	46.2	+10.2
National	Kevin Anderson	17,912	40.3	+1.0
Labor	Denise McHugh	3,813	8.6	−4.5
Christian Democrats	Neville Mammen	963	2.2	−2.0
Greens	Bruce Taylor	537	1.2	−0.8
AAFI	Norman Parsons	435	1.0	+1.0
	Stan Heuston	209	0.5	+0.5
Total formal votes		44,400	98.8	+0.3
Informal votes		527	1.2	−0.3
Turnout		44,927	94.8	
Notional two-party-preferred count
National	Kevin Anderson	22,429	74.9	+5.7
Labor	Denise McHugh	7,521	25.1	−5.7
Two-candidate-preferred result
Independent	Peter Draper	22,690	54.8	+2.9
National	Kevin Anderson	18,721	45.2	−2.9
Independent hold		Swing	+2.9	

==== 2003 ====
2003 New South Wales state election: Tamworth
Party	Candidate	Votes	%	±%
Independent	Peter Draper	16,630	40.0	+40.0
National	John Cull	16,235	39.1	+27.5
Labor	Ray Tait	4,949	11.9	−0.5
Christian Democrats	Neville Mammen	1,901	4.6	+4.6
Greens	Chris Valentine	799	1.9	+1.9
One Nation	Terry Dwyer	700	1.7	−5.0
Independent	Richard Witten	320	0.8	+0.8
Total formal votes		41,534	98.5	−0.2
Informal votes		621	1.5	+0.2
Turnout		42,155	94.2	
Notional two-party-preferred count
National	John Cull	20,069	69.9	+15.2
Labor	Ray Tait	8,637	30.1	−15.2
Two-candidate-preferred result
Independent	Peter Draper	19,542	52.5	
National	John Cull	17,692	47.5	
Independent gain from Independent		Swing	N/A	

Tony Windsor (Independent) resigned in 2001 and John Cull (National) won the seat at the resulting by-election.

==== 2001 by-election ====
2001 Tamworth by-election Saturday 8 December
Party	Candidate	Votes	%	±%
National	John Cull	14,293	36.34	+24.77
Independent	James Treloar	8,934	22.72	
Independent	Warren Woodley	5,897	15.00	
Labor	Ray Tait	5,831	14.83	+0.06
Independent	Ken McKenzie	2,775	7.06	
Democrats	Marie Cowling	771	1.96	
Independent	Clint Kelly	466	1.18	
Independent	Andre Fritze	359	0.91	
Total formal votes		39,326	98.17	−0.57
Informal votes		735	1.83	+0.57
Turnout		40,061	90.14	−4.23
Two-candidate-preferred result
National	John Cull	19,862	58.68	
Independent	James Treloar	13,984	41.32	
National gain from Independent		Swing		

Tony Windsor (Independent) resigned.

=== Elections in the 1990s ===
==== 1999 ====
1999 New South Wales state election: Tamworth
Party	Candidate	Votes	%	±%
Independent	Tony Windsor	28,182	69.4	+2.0
Labor	Siobhan Barry	5,029	12.4	−4.0
National	John Cox	4,701	11.6	+0.9
One Nation	Daphney Mandel-Hayes	2,718	6.7	+6.7
Total formal votes		40,630	98.7	+2.4
Informal votes		520	1.3	−2.4
Turnout		41,150	94.4	
Notional two-party-preferred count
National	John Cox	13,867	54.8	−27.4
Labor	Siobhan Barry	11,456	45.2	+27.4
Two-candidate-preferred result
Independent	Tony Windsor	32,288	85.2	+3.1
Labor	Siobhan Barry	5,597	14.8	−3.1
Independent hold		Swing	+3.1	

==== 1995 ====
1995 New South Wales state election: Tamworth
Party	Candidate	Votes	%	±%
Independent	Tony Windsor	28,433	82.2	+45.9
Labor	Christine Robertson	4,985	14.4	−1.2
The Country Party	John Tracy	1,186	3.4	+3.4
Total formal votes		34,604	96.5	+0.7
Informal votes		1,271	3.5	−0.7
Turnout		35,875	94.8	
Two-party-preferred result
Independent	Tony Windsor	29,088	84.8	+25.0
Labor	Christine Robertson	5,215	15.2	+15.2
Independent hold		Swing	+25.0	

==== 1991 ====
1991 New South Wales state election: Tamworth
Party	Candidate	Votes	%	±%
Independent	Tony Windsor	12,097	36.2	+36.2
National	David Briggs	10,647	31.9	−37.6
Labor	Christine Robertson	5,220	15.6	−6.6
Independent	David Evans	4,718	14.1	+14.1
Democrats	Glen Hausfield	708	2.1	−5.4
Total formal votes		33,390	95.7	−2.3
Informal votes		1,490	4.3	+2.3
Turnout		34,880	95.4	
Two-candidate-preferred result
Independent	Tony Windsor	18,602	59.8	+59.8
National	David Briggs	12,503	40.2	−34.8
Independent gain from National		Swing	+59.8	

=== Elections in the 1980s ===
==== 1988 ====
1988 New South Wales state election: Tamworth
Party	Candidate	Votes	%	±%
National	Noel Park	21,083	70.0	+11.7
Labor	Christine Robertson	6,608	21.9	−12.8
Democrats	Ivan Bielefeld	2,444	8.1	+1.1
Total formal votes		30,135	98.1	−0.8
Informal votes		587	1.9	+0.8
Turnout		30,722	95.5	
Two-party-preferred result
National	Noel Park	22,230	75.4	+13.2
Labor	Christine Robertson	7,255	24.6	−13.2
National hold		Swing	+13.2	

==== 1984 ====
1984 New South Wales state election: Tamworth
Party	Candidate	Votes	%	±%
National	Noel Park	18,639	59.1	+0.7
Labor	Garry Ryan	10,459	33.1	−2.6
Democrats	Anne Irvine	2,463	7.8	+1.9
Total formal votes		31,561	98.9	+0.9
Informal votes		354	1.1	−0.9
Turnout		31,915	94.1	+1.1
Two-party-preferred result
National	Noel Park		63.4	+1.3
Labor	Garry Ryan		36.6	−1.3
National hold		Swing	+1.3	

==== 1981 ====
1981 New South Wales state election: Tamworth
Party	Candidate	Votes	%	±%
National Country	Noel Park	17,504	58.4	+8.8
Labor	Garrett Ryan	10,689	35.7	−6.6
Democrats	Noel Cassel	1,782	5.9	0.0
Total formal votes		29,975	98.0	
Informal votes		596	2.0	
Turnout		30,571	93.0	
Two-party-preferred result
National Country	Noel Park	18,384	62.1	+8.8
Labor	Garrett Ryan	11,229	37.9	−8.8
National Country hold		Swing	+8.8	

=== Elections in the 1970s ===
==== 1978 ====
1978 New South Wales state election: Tamworth
Party	Candidate	Votes	%	±%
National Country	Noel Park	13,033	49.6	−13.2
Labor	William Forrest	11,114	42.3	+5.1
Democrats	Peter McLoughlin	1,564	6.0	+6.0
Independent	Noel Cassel	564	2.1	+2.1
Total formal votes		26,275	98.6	0.0
Informal votes		362	1.4	0.0
Turnout		26,637	94.9	+0.4
Two-party-preferred result
National Country	Noel Park	14,002	53.3	−9.5
Labor	William Forrest	12,273	46.7	+9.5
National Country hold		Swing	−9.5	

==== 1976 ====
1976 New South Wales state election: Tamworth
Party	Candidate	Votes	%	±%
Country	Noel Park	15,508	62.8	+26.9
Labor	Noel Cassel	9,190	37.2	+19.5
Total formal votes		24,698	98.6	+2.7
Informal votes		347	1.4	−2.7
Turnout		25,045	94.5	+0.5
Country hold		Swing	−0.8	

==== 1973 ====
1973 New South Wales state election: Tamworth
Party	Candidate	Votes	%	±%
Country	Noel Park	7,884	35.9	−6.9
Liberal	Neil Roberts	5,902	26.9	+26.9
Labor	William Forrest	3,888	17.7	−17.3
Labor	William Bischoff	2,959	13.5	+13.5
Australia	Joan Byrne	559	2.6	+2.6
Independent	Leonard Hill	467	2.1	+2.1
Democratic Labor	Peter Young	304	1.4	+1.4
Total formal votes		21,963	95.9	
Informal votes		943	4.1	
Turnout		22,906	94.0	
Two-party-preferred result
Country	Noel Park	13,975	63.6	+5.5
Labor	William Forrest	7,988	36.4	−5.5
Country hold		Swing	+5.5	

==== 1971 ====
1971 New South Wales state election: Tamworth
Party	Candidate	Votes	%	±%
Country	Bill Chaffey	8,661	42.8	−12.9
Labor	Francis Briscoe-Hough	7,070	35.0	+35.0
Independent	Alexander Dickinson	1,758	8.7	+8.7
Independent	Ellis Wall	1,736	8.6	+8.6
Democratic Labor	Ian de Courcy Dutton	1,002	5.0	+5.0
Total formal votes		20,227	98.6	
Informal votes		295	1.4	
Turnout		20,522	95.0	
Two-party-preferred result
Country	Bill Chaffey	11,750	58.1	
Labor	Francis Briscoe-Hough	8,477	41.9	
Country hold		Swing	N/A	

=== Elections in the 1960s ===
==== 1968 ====
1968 New South Wales state election: Tamworth
Party	Candidate	Votes	%	±%
Country	Bill Chaffey	10,506	55.7	−3.2
Independent	Stanley Cole	4,976	26.4	+26.4
New Staters	Alexander Dickinson	3,370	17.9	+17.9
Total formal votes		18,852	98.1	
Informal votes		355	1.9	
Turnout		19,207	95.9	
Two-candidate-preferred result
Country	Bill Chaffey	12,191	64.7	+5.8
Independent	Stanley Cole	6,661	35.3	+35.3
Country hold		Swing	+5.8	

==== 1965 ====
1965 New South Wales state election: Tamworth
Party	Candidate	Votes	%	±%
Country	Bill Chaffey	11,708	58.9	−2.6
Labor	Stanley Cole	8,164	41.1	+2.6
Total formal votes		19,872	99.2	+0.1
Informal votes		164	0.8	−0.1
Turnout		20,036	95.6	+0.5
Country hold		Swing	−2.6	

==== 1962 ====
1962 New South Wales state election: Tamworth
Party	Candidate	Votes	%	±%
Country	Bill Chaffey	11,679	61.4	
Labor	Norman Turner	7,328	38.6	
Total formal votes		19,007	99.1	
Informal votes		173	0.9	
Turnout		19,180	95.1	
Country hold		Swing	N/A	

=== Elections in the 1950s ===
==== 1959 ====
1959 New South Wales state election: Tamworth
Party	Candidate	Votes	%	±%
Country	Bill Chaffey	unopposed		
Country hold				

==== 1956 ====
1956 New South Wales state election: Tamworth
Party	Candidate	Votes	%	±%
Country	Bill Chaffey	11,203	61.8	+7.2
Labor	Arthur Foran	6,921	38.2	−7.2
Total formal votes		18,124	99.1	+0.1
Informal votes		163	0.9	−0.1
Turnout		18,287	92.8	−3.1
Country hold		Swing	+7.2	

==== 1953 ====
1953 New South Wales state election: Tamworth
Party	Candidate	Votes	%	±%
Country	Bill Chaffey	9,741	54.6	
Labor	William Scully	8,084	45.4	
Total formal votes		17,825	99.0	
Informal votes		179	1.0	
Turnout		18,004	95.9	
Country hold		Swing		

==== 1950 ====
1950 New South Wales state election: Tamworth
Party	Candidate	Votes	%	±%
Country	Bill Chaffey	unopposed		
Country hold				

=== Elections in the 1940s ===
==== 1947 ====
1947 New South Wales state election: Tamworth
Party	Candidate	Votes	%	±%
Country	Bill Chaffey	6,004	56.8	+56.8
Labor	Cyril Cahill	6,076	43.2	+43.2
Total formal votes		14,080	98.9	
Informal votes		158	1.1	
Turnout		14,238	95.7	
Member changed to Country from Independent		Swing	N/A	

==== 1944 ====
1944 New South Wales state election: Tamworth
Party	Candidate	Votes	%	±%
Independent	Bill Chaffey	unopposed		
Independent hold				

==== 1941 ====
1941 New South Wales state election: Tamworth
Party	Candidate	Votes	%	±%
Ind. United Australia	Bill Chaffey (Note: Bill Chaffey had been elected as a UAP candidate at the 1940 Tamworth by-election. He continued to support the government however declined UAP endorsement for the 1941 election on the basis his support came from the Country Party as well as the UAP.)	6,535	49.6	
Labor	John Lyons	5,145	39.1	
United Australia	William McKnight	1,237	9.4	
Independent	Charles Luckett	258	2.0	
Total formal votes		13,175	98.4	
Informal votes		207	1.6	
Turnout		13,382	94.2	
After distribution of preferences
Ind. United Australia	Bill Chaffey	6,676	50.7	
Labor	John Lyons	5,189	39.4	
United Australia	William McKnight	1,310	9.9	
Member changed to Ind. United Australia from United Australia		Swing		

- Preferences were not distributed to completion.

==== 1940 by-election ====
1940 Tamworth by-election Saturday 10 August
Party	Candidate	Votes	%	±%
United Australia	Bill Chaffey	6,850	54.6	−5.4
Labor (N-C)	Thomas Ryan	2,958	23.6	
Labor	John Lyons	2,737	21.8	−12.3
Total formal votes		12,545	98.9	+0.5
Informal votes		142	1.1	−0.5
Turnout		12,687	87.9	−6.3
United Australia hold		Swing	−5.4	

Frank Chaffey (United Australia) died.

=== Elections in the 1930s ===
==== 1938 ====
1938 New South Wales state election: Tamworth
Party	Candidate	Votes	%	±%
United Australia	Frank Chaffey	8,255	60.0	−15.7
Labor	John Killalea	4,688	34.1	+7.9
Independent	Augustine Logue	804	5.9	+5.9
Total formal votes		13,747	98.5	+0.6
Informal votes		204	1.5	−0.6
Turnout		13,951	96.8	+0.8
United Australia hold		Swing	N/A	

- Preferences were not distributed.

==== 1935 ====
1935 New South Wales state election: Tamworth
Party	Candidate	Votes	%	±%
United Australia	Frank Chaffey	5,879	44.3	−16.6
Labor (NSW)	William McArdle	3,469	26.2	+1.0
Independent	William McKnight	2,096	15.8	+15.8
Independent	James Brownhill	1,221	9.2	−3.9
Independent	John Killalea	602	4.5	+4.5
Total formal votes		13,267	97.9	−0.5
Informal votes		283	2.1	+0.5
Turnout		13,550	96.0	−0.9
Two-party-preferred result
United Australia	Frank Chaffey	8,258	62.2	
Labor (NSW)	William McArdle	5,009	37.8	
United Australia hold		Swing	N/A	

==== 1932 ====
1932 New South Wales state election: Tamworth
Party	Candidate	Votes	%	±%
United Australia	Frank Chaffey	7,585	60.9	+6.0
Labor (NSW)	Thomas Normoyle	3,145	25.2	−18.1
Independent Country	James Brownhill	1,637	13.1	+13.1
Independent	James Neale	97	0.8	+0.8
Total formal votes		12,464	98.4	+0.5
Informal votes		198	1.6	−0.5
Turnout		12,662	96.9	+0.5
United Australia hold		Swing	N/A	

- Preferences were not distributed.

==== 1930 ====
1930 New South Wales state election: Tamworth
Party	Candidate	Votes	%	±%
Nationalist	Frank Chaffey	6,720	54.9	
Labor	Samuel Scully	5,296	43.3	
Independent	Francis Brennan	179	1.5	
Communist	Robert McCall	36	0.3	
Total formal votes		12,231	97.9	
Informal votes		265	2.1	
Turnout		12,496	96.4	
Nationalist hold		Swing		

=== Elections in the 1920s ===
==== 1927 ====
This section is an excerpt from 1927 New South Wales state election § Tamworth

1927 New South Wales state election: Tamworth
Party	Candidate	Votes	%	±%
Nationalist	Frank Chaffey	7,990	71.4	
Independent	Robert Levien	3,203	28.6	
Total formal votes		11,193	97.6	
Informal votes		270	2.4	
Turnout		11,463	78.8	
Nationalist win		(new seat)		

District recreated

==== 1920–1927 ====
District abolished

=== Elections in the 1910s ===
==== 1917 ====
This section is an excerpt from 1917 New South Wales state election § Tamworth

1917 New South Wales state election: Tamworth
Party	Candidate	Votes	%	±%
Nationalist	Frank Chaffey	3,682	53.1	+53.1
Independent	Robert Levien	3,246	46.9	+15.6
Total formal votes		6,928	99.1	+2.1
Informal votes		65	0.9	−2.1
Turnout		6,993	68.1	−6.1
Nationalist hold				

==== 1913 ====
1913 New South Wales state election: Tamworth
Party	Candidate	Votes	%	±%
Farmers and Settlers	Frank Chaffey (Note: Also endorsed by Liberal Reform.)	2,620	36.5	
Labor	John Lord	2,315	32.3	
Independent	Robert Levien (defeated)	2,243	31.2	
Total formal votes		7,178	97.0	
Informal votes		225	3.0	
Turnout		7,403	74.2	
Second round result
Farmers and Settlers	Frank Chaffey	3,779	51.0	
Labor	John Lord	3,624	49.0	
Total formal votes		7,403	99.5	
Informal votes		39	0.5	
Turnout		7,442	74.5	
Farmers and Settlers gain from Independent Liberal				

Robert Levien was the sitting member.

==== 1910 ====
This section is an excerpt from 1910 New South Wales state election § Tamworth

1910 New South Wales state election: Tamworth
Party	Candidate	Votes	%	±%
Independent Liberal	Robert Levien	3,997	60.9	+0.9
Labour	John Lord	2,562	39.1	+35.6
Total formal votes		6,559	97.1	+0.7
Informal votes		197	2.9	−0.7
Turnout		6,756	69.6	+5.9
Member changed to Independent Liberal from Progressive (defunct)				

=== Elections in the 1900s ===
==== 1907 ====
This section is an excerpt from 1907 New South Wales state election § Tamworth

1907 New South Wales state election: Tamworth
Party	Candidate	Votes	%	±%
Former Progressive	Robert Levien	2,783	60.0	
Independent	Samuel Walker	1,696	36.5	
Labour	Harold Farleigh (Note: The Worker listed Harold Farleigh as a Labour candidate, while the Sydney Morning Herald listed him as an Independent Labour candidate.)	162	3.5	
Total formal votes		4,641	96.5	
Informal votes		171	3.6	
Turnout		4,812	63.7	
Former Progressive hold				

==== 1904 ====
This section is an excerpt from 1904 New South Wales state election § Tamworth

1904 New South Wales state election: Tamworth
Party	Candidate	Votes	%	±%
Progressive	Robert Levien	2,933	60.6	
Liberal Reform	John Garland	1,907	39.4	
Total formal votes		4,840	99.5	
Informal votes		27	0.6	
Turnout		4,867	70.2	
Progressive gain from Independent				

Tamworth was expanded to include part of the abolished seat of Quirindi. Raymond Walsh (Independent) had won the 1901 election for Tamworth, however he was made bankrupt in 1903 and was defeated in the subsequent by-election, by John Garland (Liberal Reform). Robert Levien (Progressive) was the member for Quirindi and had previously been one of two members for Tamworth from 1880 until 1894.

==== 1903 by-election ====
1903 Tamworth by-election Saturday 4 April
Party	Candidate	Votes	%	±%
Liberal Reform	John Garland	688	48.8	+6.8
Progressive	Raymond Walsh (Note: Raymond Walsh had been elected as an independent at the 1901 election, however he joined the Progressive Party for the by-election.) (defeated)	551	39.1	−5.6
Labor	Thomas Thrower	164	11.6	
Independent	David Todd	6	0.4	
Total formal votes		1,409	99.1	−0.3
Informal votes		13	0.9	+0.3
Turnout		1,422	62.6 (Note: based on a roll of 2,270 at the 1901 election.)	−5.5
Liberal Reform gain from Independent		Swing		

Raymond Walsh (Progressive) was made bankrupt.

==== 1901 ====
This section is an excerpt from 1901 New South Wales state election § Tamworth

1901 New South Wales state election: Tamworth
Party	Candidate	Votes	%	±%
Independent	Raymond Walsh	687	44.7	
Liberal Reform	Albert Piddington	646	42.0	−6.8
Progressive	Geoffrey Codrington	204	13.3	−38.0
Total formal votes		1,537	99.4	+0.7
Informal votes		9	0.6	−0.7
Turnout		1,546	68.1	+2.8
Independent gain from Progressive				

The sitting member was William Sawers (Progressive) who did not contest the election as he had been elected in March 1901 to the federal seat of New England.

=== Elections in the 1890s ===
==== 1898 ====
This section is an excerpt from 1898 New South Wales colonial election § Tamworth

1898 New South Wales colonial election: Tamworth
Party	Candidate	Votes	%	±%
National Federal	William Sawers	674	51.2	
Free Trade	Albert Piddington	642	48.8	
Total formal votes		1,316	98.7	
Informal votes		17	1.3	
Turnout		1,333	65.3	
National Federal gain from Free Trade				

==== 1895 ====
This section is an excerpt from 1895 New South Wales colonial election § Tamworth

1895 New South Wales colonial election: Tamworth
Party	Candidate	Votes	%	±%
Free Trade	Albert Piddington	621	52.6	
Protectionist	George Dibbs	559	47.4	
Total formal votes		1,180	99.4	
Informal votes		7	0.6	
Turnout		1,187	70.4	
Free Trade gain from Protectionist				

==== 1894 ====
This section is an excerpt from 1894 New South Wales colonial election § Tamworth

1894 New South Wales colonial election: Tamworth
Party	Candidate	Votes	%	±%
Protectionist	George Dibbs	612	43.2	
Free Trade	Albert Piddington	492	34.8	
Independent Labour	Raymond Walsh	277	19.6	
Ind. Protectionist	James Toohey	35	2.5	
Total formal votes		1,416	99.2	
Informal votes		12	0.8	
Turnout		1,428	83.1	
Protectionist win		(previously 2 members)		

==== 1891 ====
This section is an excerpt from 1891 New South Wales colonial election § Tamworth

1891 New South Wales colonial election: Tamworth Wednesday 24 June
Party	Candidate	Votes	%	±%
Protectionist	Robert Levien (re-elected 1)	916	28.7	
Protectionist	William Dowel (re-elected 2)	887	27.8	
Labour	Raymond Walsh	755	23.6	
Free Trade	William Tribe	637	19.9	
Total formal votes		3,195	98.9	
Informal votes		35	1.1	
Turnout		2,074	52.2	
Protectionist hold 2				

=== Elections in the 1880s ===
==== 1889 by-election ====
1889 Tamworth by-election Tuesday 18 June
Party	Candidate	Votes	%	±%
Protectionist	Robert Levien (re-elected)	Unopposed		
Protectionist hold				

Robert Levien (Protectionist) resigned because the Supreme Court had found him guilty of dishonourable conduct.

==== 1889 ====
This section is an excerpt from 1889 New South Wales colonial election § Tamworth

1889 New South Wales colonial election: Tamworth Monday 4 February
Party	Candidate	Votes	%	±%
Protectionist	Robert Levien (elected 1)	1,011	35.3	
Protectionist	William Dowel (elected 2)	995	34.8	
Free Trade	William Tribe	855	29.9	
Total formal votes		2,861	99.4	
Informal votes		16	0.6	
Turnout		1,774	51.1	
Protectionist hold 2				

==== 1887 ====
This section is an excerpt from 1887 New South Wales colonial election § Tamworth

1887 New South Wales colonial election: Tamworth Monday 21 February
Party	Candidate	Votes	%	±%
Protectionist	Robert Levien (re-elected 1)	928	28.0	
Protectionist	William Dowel (elected 2)	829	25.0	
Free Trade	William Tribe	784	23.6	
Free Trade	Eustace Pratt	776	23.4	
Total formal votes		3,317	99.0	
Informal votes		32	1.0	
Turnout		1,784	58.2	

==== 1885 ====
This section is an excerpt from 1885 New South Wales colonial election § Tamworth

1885 New South Wales colonial election: Tamworth Wednesday 21 October
Candidate	Votes	%
Robert Levien (re-elected 1)	882	29.4
Michael Burke (elected 2)	772	25.8
John Gill (defeated)	707	23.6
William Dowel	402	13.4
A Sampson	235	7.8
Total formal votes	2,998	98.9
Informal votes	32	1.1
Turnout	1,676	58.4

==== 1882 ====
This section is an excerpt from 1882 New South Wales colonial election § Tamworth

1882 New South Wales colonial election: Tamworth Wednesday 13 December
Candidate	Votes	%
Robert Levien (re-elected 1)	1,021	44.2
John Gill (elected 2)	699	30.3
Michael Burke	591	25.6
Total formal votes	2,311	99.1
Informal votes	21	0.9
Turnout	1,387	46.0

The other sitting member Sydney Burdekin unsuccessfully contested South Sydney.

==== 1880 ====
This section is an excerpt from 1880 New South Wales colonial election § Tamworth

1880 New South Wales colonial election: Tamworth Thursday 2 December
Candidate	Votes	%
Sydney Burdekin (elected 1)	821	29.3
Robert Levien (elected 2)	820	29.3
Michael Burke	610	21.8
Hanley Bennett (defeated)	548	19.6
Total formal votes	2,799	99.1
Informal votes	25	0.9
Turnout	2,824	39.2
	(new seat)	

Hanley Bennett was the member for the abolished district of Liverpool Plains.
