= Candidates of the 2003 New South Wales state election =

This article provides information on candidates who stood for the 2003 New South Wales state election. The election was held on 22 March 2003.

== Retiring Members ==
=== Labor ===
- Richard Face MLA (Charlestown)
- Deirdre Grusovin MLA (Heffron)
- Gabrielle Harrison MLA (Parramatta)
- Faye Lo Po' MLA (Penrith)
- Col Markham MLA (Wollongong)
- Ian McManus MLA (Heathcote)
- Kevin Moss MLA (Canterbury)
- John Murray MLA (Drummoyne)
- Ernie Page MLA (Coogee)
- George Thompson MLA (Rockdale)
- Paul Whelan MLA (Strathfield)
- Harry Woods MLA (Clarence)
- Ron Dyer MLC
- Janelle Saffin MLC

=== Liberal ===
- Kerry Chikarovski MLA (Lane Cove)
- Peter Collins MLA (Willoughby)
- Ian Glachan MLA (Albury)
- Liz Kernohan MLA (Camden)
- Kevin Rozzoli MLA (Hawkesbury)
- Russell Smith MLA (Bega)
- John Jobling MLC
- Brian Pezzutti MLC
- Jim Samios MLC

=== Other ===
- Alan Corbett MLC – A Better Future For Our Children
- Richard Jones MLC – Independent, elected as Democrat
- Helen Sham-Ho MLC – Independent, elected as Liberal

== Legislative Assembly ==
Sitting members at the time of the election are shown in bold text. Successful candidates are highlighted in the relevant colour. Where there is possible confusion, an asterisk (*) is also used.

Electorate	Held by	Labor candidate	Coalition candidate	Greens candidate	One Nation NSW candidate	Christian Democrats candidate	Other candidates
Albury	Liberal	Nico Mathews	Greg Aplin (Lib)	Darran Stonehouse	John Morgans	Gail Schwartze	Robert Ballard (Ind); Claire Douglas (Ind); Sue Galley (AAFI); Heather Wilton (Ind)
Auburn	Labor	**Barbara Perry**	Levent Emirali (Lib)	Steve Maxwell	Kane O'Connor	Greg Kaitanovich	Shui Au (Unity); Keith Darley (Dem); Dale Francis (AAFI); Roberto Jorquera (SA); Thoria Yagoub (RLS)
Ballina	National	Sue Dakin	**Don Page** (Nat)	Jan Barham	Darren May		Nic Faulkner (Ind)
Bankstown	Labor	**Tony Stewart**	David Grabovac (Lib)	Sanaa Ghabbar	Bradley Torr	Janne Peterson	Joseph McDermott (Dem); Gregg Pringle (AAFI); Nasser Roumieh (Unity); Hanan Sowilam (RLS); Sam Wainwright (SA)
Barwon	National	Meryl Dillon	**Ian Slack-Smith** (Nat)	David Paull	Chris Spence		Richard Stringer (Ind); Jack Warnock (Ind)
Bathurst	Labor	**Gerard Martin**	Ann Thompson (Nat)	Brian Shoebridge			Warren Rowe (Ind); David Simpson (Ind); John Wilkie (AAFI)
Baulkham Hills	Liberal	Tony Hay	**Wayne Merton** (Lib)	Gabi Martinez		Tania Piper	Anne Bi (Unity); George Bilson (AAFI); Margaret van de Weg (Dem)
Bega	Liberal	Wilma Chinnock	Andrew Constance (Lib)	Annie Florence	Lynn Abrahams	Ursula Bennett	Chris Vardon (Ind)
Blacktown	Labor	**Paul Gibson**	Geoff Bisby (Lib)	Jason Bethune	Brian Zahner	Bob Bawden	Selmen Alameddine (Unity); Lindon Dedman (AAFI); David King (Dem); Goran Reves (Ind)
Bligh	Independent	Barri Phatarfod	Shayne Mallard (Lib)	Anita Ceravolo		Jon Phillips	Gary Burns (Ind); Malcolm Duncan (Ind); **Clover Moore*** (Ind); Stephen Pong (Unity)
Blue Mountains	Labor	**Bob Debus**	Quentin Cook (Lib)	Pippa McInnes	George Grivas	Brian Grigg	Esther Scholem (Dem); Ay Tan (Unity)
Burrinjuck	National	Michael McManus	**Katrina Hodgkinson** (Nat)	Bob Muntz	Michael MacDonald	Susan Pinsuti	Lindsay Cosgrove (Ind)
Cabramatta	Labor	**Reba Meagher**	Paul Newton (Lib)	Lee Grant	David Taunton-Webb	Sean Hampsey	Ross Treyvaud (Ind); Christopher Wong (Unity)
Camden	Liberal	Geoff Corrigan	Paul Masina (Lib)	Allen Powell	George Diamantes		Max Brazenall (AAFI); Cindy Cagney (Ind); Eva Campbell (Ind); Craig Digby (Dem)
Campbelltown	Labor	**Graham West**	David Wright (Lib)	Victoria Waldron Hahn	Rosemary Easton		Ghaleb Alameddine (Unity); Charles Byrne (AAFI); Leigh Ninham (Dem)
Canterbury	Labor	Linda Burney	Jack Kouzi (Lib)	Dominic Fitzsimmons			John Koutsouras (Ind); Ken Nam (Unity); Peter Siapos (SOS)
Cessnock	Labor	**Kerry Hickey**	Dale Troy (Nat)	Kerry Suwald	John Bailey		Graham Capararo (Dem); Patricia St Lawrence (Ind)
Charlestown	Labor	Matthew Morris	Fiona Glen (Lib)	Keith Parsons	John Phillips	Jennifer Boswell	James Bateman (AAFI); Kate Ferguson (Ind); Kathy Newnam (SA); Peter Nikoletatos (Ind)
Clarence	Labor	Terry Flanagan	Steve Cansdell (Nat)	Mark Purcell	Marjorie Burston	Brian Hughes	Doug Behn (Ind); Marie Mathew (Ind); Alec York (Dem)
Coffs Harbour	National	Pamela Stephenson	**Andrew Fraser** (Nat)	Gabrielle Tindall	Tenille Burston	Greg Holder	Evalds Erglis (Ind); Keith Rhoades (Ind); Jan Strom (Ind)
Coogee	Labor	Paul Pearce	David McBride (Lib)	Murray Matson			Lisa Li (Unity); Lindy Morrison (Dem); Barry Watterson (Ind)
Cronulla	Liberal	Scott Docherty	**Malcolm Kerr** (Lib)	John Vlamitsopoulos	Renata McCallum	Beth Smith	Siu Au (Unity); Warren Feinbier (AAFI); Tracie Sonda (Ind)
Davidson	Liberal	Angelo Rolos	**Andrew Humpherson** (Lib)	Conny Harris		Wally Vanderpoll	Zi Cai (Unity); John Collins (AAFI); Daniel Stevens (Dem)
Drummoyne	Labor	Angela D'Amore	Greg Long (Lib)	Mersina Soulos			Stephen Bathgate (Ind); Andrew Blake (Dem); Stephen Muller (Ind); Alexander Pini (AAFI); Salvatore Scevola (Ind); Tina Turrisi (Unity); Michael Wroblewski (Ind)
Dubbo	Independent	Leo Dawson	Mark Horton (Nat)	Steve Maier	Ian Hutchins		Ronald Atkins (AAFI); **Tony McGrane*** (Ind)
East Hills	Labor	**Alan Ashton**	Glenn Brookes (Lib)	Sonya McKay	Mark Potter	Karen Reid	Alan Cronin (Ind); Nabil Dabbagh (Dem); Howard Dakin (AAFI); Stanley Xie (Unity)
Epping	Liberal	Mark Lyons	**Andrew Tink** (Lib)	Matthew Benson		Owen Nannelli	David Chan (Unity); David Mudgee (AAFI); Philip Sparks (Dem)
Fairfield	Labor	**Joe Tripodi**	Awad Karam (Lib)	Roger Barsony	Nada Taunton-Henderson		Michael Chehoff (AAFI); Nguyen Truong (Unity)
Georges River	Labor	**Kevin Greene**	Joanne McCafferty (Lib)	Christine Welsh	Mary Kennedy		Michele Adair (Ind); Francis Bush (AAFI); John Lau (Unity)
Gosford	Liberal	Deborah O'Neill	**Chris Hartcher** (Lib)	Mark Dickinson			Ian Lamont (SOS); Yieu Mak (Unity); Allison Newman (Dem)
Granville	Labor	**Kim Yeadon**	Judy Irvine (Lib)	Wafaa Salti	Shane O'Connor	Karen Pender	John Drake (Ind); Colin McDermott (Dem); John McGrath (AAFI); Somchai Tongsumrith (Unity)
Hawkesbury	Liberal	Carl Bazeley	Steven Pringle (Lib)	Laurie Fraser	Noelene Saxiones		John Griffiths (Ind); Hugh McNaught (AAFI); Judy Pope (Ind); Rex Stubbs (Ind); Bruce van de Weg (Dem); Ngoc Vuong (Unity)
Heathcote	Labor	Paul McLeay	Peter Vermeer (Lib)	Tanya Leishman	Peter McCallum	Jim Bowen	Christopher Camp (HRP); Michael Toohey (AAFI)
Heffron	Labor	Kristina Keneally	Sarah Lawrance (Lib)	Will Smith			John Bush (Ind); Stephen Chanphakeo (Dem); Alan Lai (Unity); John Tullis (Ind); Margery Whitehead (Ind)
Hornsby	Liberal	Susan White	**Judy Hopwood** (Lib)	Wendy McMurdo		John Salvaggio	William Chan (Unity); Mick Gallagher (Ind); Kate Orman (Dem); David Wadsworth (AAFI)
Illawarra	Labor	**Marianne Saliba**	Benjamin Caldwell (Lib)	Margaret Johansen	Robert Kennedy	Richard Harris	John Cipov (AAFI); Barry Hennessy (Ind); Bill Heycott (Ind); Charles Mifsud (Ind); Chris Williams (SA)
Keira	Labor	**David Campbell**	Lee Evans (Lib)	Michael Sergent	Frederick Leach	George Carfield	Garth Fraser (AAFI)
Kiama	Labor	**Matt Brown**	Danielle Jones (Lib)	Howard Jones	Helga Green	John Cadwell	Henry Collier (Dem); Clive Curnow (AAFI)
Kogarah	Labor	**Cherie Burton**	Val Colyer (Lib)	Soraya Kassim			Alison Bailey (Dem); Naxin Liu (Unity)
Ku-ring-gai	Liberal	Andrew Hewitt	**Barry O'Farrell** (Lib)	Susie Gemmell		Witold Wiszniewski	Ian Boyd (Dem); Chiming Shea (Unity)
Lachlan	National	Stephen Pollard	**Ian Armstrong** (Nat)	Jenny McKinnon	Russell Constable		
Lake Macquarie	Labor	**Jeff Hunter**	Michael Chamberlain (Lib)	Howard Morrison	Trevor Gander		Leonard Hodge (AAFI)
Lakemba	Labor	**Morris Iemma**	Daniel Try (Lib)	Bashir Sawalha		Zarif Abdulla	Gregory Briscoe-Hough (Ind); Gengxing Chen (Unity); Mary Habib (RLS)
Lane Cove	Liberal	Gabrielle O'Donnell	Anthony Roberts (Lib)	Shauna Forrest			Pei Li (Unity); Suzanne McGillivray (Dem)
Lismore	National	Peter Lanyon	**Thomas George** (Nat)	John Corkill			Nick Fredman (SA); Angela Griffiths (Ind); Julia Melland (Dem)
Liverpool	Labor	**Paul Lynch**	Domenico Acitelli (Lib)	Michael Tierney	Michael Boland	Godwin Goh	Ahmad Alameddine (Unity); Victor Boyd (AAFI)
Londonderry	Labor	**Jim Anderson** (died)	Kevin Conolly (Lib)	Allan Quinn	Col Easton	John Phillips	Sonia Bennett (SOS); Jim Cassidy (Dem); Kurt Gelling (AAFI)
Londonderry	Labor	Allan Shearan		Allan Quinn	Col Easton	John Phillips	Boyd Falconer (Ind); Norman Hooper (Ind); Janey Woodger (AAFI)
Macquarie Fields	Labor	**Craig Knowles**	Jai Rowell (Lib)	Peter Butler	Rhonda McDonald	Jim Parkins	Mick Allen (Ind); William Body (Dem); James Grindrod (AAFI); Kek Tai (Unity)
Maitland	Labor	**John Price**	Bob Geoghegan (Lib)	Aine Ranke	Christine Ferguson		Sharon Davies (Dem); Ann Lawler (Ind); John Lee (Ind); Loan Truong (Unity)
Manly	Independent	Hugh Zochling	Jean Hay (Lib)	Keelah Lam		Marjorie Moffitt	**David Barr*** (Ind); Mark Norek (Ind); David Prior (AAFI); John Yuen (Unity)
Maroubra	Labor	**Bob Carr**	David Coleman (Lib)	Rik Jurcevic			Kirsten Bennell (Dem); Chuan Ren (Unity)
Marrickville	Labor	**Andrew Refshauge**	Ramzy Mansour (Lib)	Colin Hesse			Sue Johnson (SA); Henson Liang (Unity); David Mendelssohn (Dem); Richard Raw (Ind); Lorraine Thomson (SOS)
Menai	Labor	**Alison Megarrity**	Brett Thomas (Lib)	Tina Pallandinetti	Susan Oz		Michael Byrne (Ind); Thomas Su (Unity)
Miranda	Labor	**Barry Collier**	Kevin Schreiber (Lib)	Julie Simpson			Allan Duckett (AAFI); Gordon Hocking (SOS); John Moffatt (Ind); Lisan Yang (Unity)
Monaro	National	Steve Whan	**Peter Webb** (Nat)	Catherine Moore	Ian Hale		Carol Atkins (Ind)
Mount Druitt	Labor	**Richard Amery**	Allan Green (Lib)	Brent Robertson		Joseph Wyness	Peter Kerr (SOS); Alicia Lantry (Dem); Richard Newton (AAFI); John Uri (Unity)
Mulgoa	Labor	**Diane Beamer**	Christine Bourne (Lib)	William Gayed	Michael Church		Lorraine Dodd (Dem); Dennis Fordyce (AAFI); Jean Lopez (SOS)
Murray-Darling	Labor	**Peter Black**	Marsha Isbester (Nat)	Geoff Walsh	Tom Kennedy		Don McKinnon (Ind)
Murrumbidgee	National	Michael Kidd	**Adrian Piccoli** (Nat)	Martin Ducker			
Myall Lakes	National	Lisa Clancy	**John Turner** (Nat)	Linda Gill	Colleen Burston		John Chadban (Ind); Paul Hennelly (FP); Vickie Lantry (Dem); Ian McCaffrey (Ind); Barry Moulds (AAFI); Mick Tuck (Ind)
Newcastle	Labor	**Bryce Gaudry**	David Parker (Lib)	Ian McKenzie	Gladys Gander	Elaine Battersby	Brett Paterson (Dem); Nawal Sami (Unity); Harry Williams (Ind)
North Shore	Liberal	Tabitha Wilton	**Jillian Skinner** (Lib)	Ted Nixon			Allen Frick (Dem); Jim Reid (Ind); Xiaogang Zhang (Unity)
Northern Tablelands	Independent	Michaela Fogarty	Peter Bailey (Nat)	Brendon Perrin	James Donald	Isabel Strutt	John Irvine (Ind); **Richard Torbay*** (Ind)
Orange	National	Glenn Taylor	**Russell Turner** (Nat)	Jeremy Buckingham		Bruce McLean	Peter Hetherington (Ind)
Oxley	National	Gerard Hayes	**Andrew Stoner** (Nat)	Jeremy Bradley	Helen Fearn		
Parramatta	Labor	Tanya Gadiel	Chiang Lim (Lib)	Doug Wilkinson	Daniel Mullins	Michael Morgan	Ernest Chan (Unity); Les Vance (Ind); Lorraine Wearne (Ind); Tony Yoo (Dem)
Peats	Labor	**Marie Andrews**	Debra Wales (Lib)	Vicki Brooke			Mark Ellis (SOS); John Goldsmith (AAFI); Chris Holstein (Ind); Peter Moore (Ind); Geoff Ward (Dem)
Penrith	Labor	Karyn Paluzzano	Jim Aitken (Lib)	Lesley Edwards	Judith Danzie	Kenneth Nathan	Mitch Arvidson (Ind); Barbie Bates (SOS); Li Cai (Unity); Kevin Crameri (Ind); Ian Gelling (AAFI); Geraldine Waters (Dem)
Pittwater	Liberal	Ben Carpentier	**John Brogden** (Lib)	Hunter Walters		Andrew Amos	George Atkinson (AAFI); Hue Lee (Unity); Jane Rowe (Dem)
Port Jackson	Labor	**Sandra Nori**	Nick Dyer (Lib)	Jamie Parker			Paul Benedek (SA); Polly Chan (Unity); Simon Glastonbury (Dem); Victor Shen (FP)
Port Macquarie	National	Robert Hough	Charlie Fenton (Nat)	Susie Russell		Kerry Medway	James McLeod (AAFI); Graeme Muldoon (Ind); **Rob Oakeshott*** (Ind)
Port Stephens	Labor	**John Bartlett**	Sally Dover (Lib)	Tom Griffiths	Paul Fuller	Brian Milton	Felicity Boyd (Dem); Tony King (Ind)
Riverstone	Labor	**John Aquilina**	Ray Williams (Lib)	Sheryl Jarecki	Paul Cluderay	Greg Tan	Norm Parsons (AAFI); Tom Peacock (Dem)
Rockdale	Labor	Frank Sartor	Jan Brennan (Lib)	Lesa de Leau		Stephan Winter	Eoin Coghlan (Dem); Mark Curran (SOS); Thomas Foley (AAFI); Mahmoud Ghalayini (Ind); John Nikolovski (Ind); Kevin Ryan (Ind); Cong Tran (Unity)
Ryde	Labor	**John Watkins**	Paul Nicolaou (Lib)	Jimmy Shaw		David Collins	Lawrence Chan (Unity); Chris Owens (Dem)
Smithfield	Labor	**Carl Scully**	Essam Benjamin (Lib)	Johnn Fonseca	Gerald Cluderay	Manny Poularas	Steve Chung (Unity); David Holloway (Dem)
South Coast	Liberal	**Wayne Smith**	Shelley Hancock (Lib)	Jane Bange	Carmelo Savoca	Steve Ryan	Pam Arnold (Ind); Barry McCaffery (Ind); Greg Watson (Ind)
Southern Highlands	Liberal	Noeline Brown	**Peta Seaton** (Lib)	Jim Clark	Nathan McDonald		Jean McClung (Ind)
Strathfield	Labor	Virginia Judge	Joe Tannous (Lib)	Mary Hawkins			Anna Garrett (Dem); Morris Mansour (Ind); Alfred Tsang (Unity)
Swansea	Labor	**Milton Orkopoulos**	Dell Tschanter (Lib)	Charmian Eckersley	James Flowers		John Ingram (AAFI); Peter Lee (Dem); Anthony Meany (SOS)
Tamworth	National	Ray Tait	**John Cull** (Nat)	Chris Valentine	Terry Dwyer	Neville Mammen	Peter Draper* (Ind); Richard Witten (Ind)
The Entrance	Labor	**Grant McBride**	Phil Walker (Lib)	Gwen Parry-Jones	Peter Chermak	Steve Wild	Bryan Ellis (SOS); Carolyn Hastie (Dem); Garry Oates (AAFI)
The Hills	Liberal	Anthony Ellard	**Michael Richardson** (Lib)	Jocelyn Howden		Ken Gregory	Albert Dowman (AAFI); Kamran Keshavarz Talebi (Dem); Robert McLeod (Unity); Rob Stanton (Ind)
Tweed	Labor	**Neville Newell**	Sue Vinnicombe (Nat)	Tom Tabart	Trent Burston		Casey Balk (Dem); Ned Kelly (FP)
Upper Hunter	National	Chris Connor	**George Souris** (Nat)	Neil Strachan	David Churches		Steven Lawler (Ind)
Vaucluse	Liberal	Alice Salomon	**Peter Debnam** (Lib)	Rory O'Gorman			Teck Yong (Unity)
Wagga Wagga	Liberal	Col McPherson	**Daryl Maguire** (Lib)	Jim Rees	Daniel Chermak		Rex Graham (Dem)
Wakehurst	Liberal	Chris Sharpe	**Brad Hazzard** (Lib)	Peter Forrest		Mike Hubbard	Tony Howells (Dem); Rita Lee (Unity); Vincent de Luca (Ind); Anthony Mavin (AAFI)
Wallsend	Labor	**John Mills**	David Williams (Lib)	Michael Osborne	Edna Phillips	Jim Kendall	Sharyn Csanki (Dem); Di Gibson (Ind)
Wentworthville	Labor	**Pam Allan**	Brett Murray (Lib)	Darren Reader		Sam Baissari	Lyndon Shepherd (AAFI); Cynthia Su (Unity); Ian Swallow (Dem)
Willoughby	Liberal	Imogen Wareing	Gladys Berejiklian (Lib)	Mike Steele		Leighton Thew	Robert Butler (Ind); Sylvia Chao (Unity); Caroline Mayfield (Dem); Pat Reilly (Ind)
Wollongong	Labor	Noreen Hay	George Pride (Lib)	Meredith Henderson		Phil Latz	David Hughes (AAFI); Van Mach (Unity); David Moulds (Ind); Anne Wood (Ind)
Wyong	Labor	**Paul Crittenden**	Ben Morton (Lib)	Scott Rickard	Joanne May	Gerda Hailes	Joyce Moylan (AAFI); Dianne Smith-Di Francesco (Ind); Christopher Stennett (Dem)

== Legislative Council ==
Sitting members are shown in bold text. Tickets that elected at least one MLC are highlighted in the relevant colour. Successful candidates are identified by an asterisk (*).

Labor candidates	Coalition candidates	Greens candidates	Christian Democrats candidates	Shooters candidates
1. **Michael Egan***; 2. **Carmel Tebbutt***; 3. **Michael Costa***; 4. **Ian West***; 5. **Tony Kelly***; 6. **Peter Primrose***; 7. Tony Burke*; 8. Christine Robertson*; 9. Kayee Griffin*; 10. Tony Catanzariti*; 11. Alison Peters; 12. Warren Mundine; 13. Pierre Esber; 14. Sophie Cotsis; 15. Lois Boswell; 16. Linda Kirgan; 17. Gerald Ng; 18. Carly Learson	1. **Mike Gallacher*** (Lib); 2. **Duncan Gay*** (Nat); 3. **Greg Pearce*** (Lib); 4. David Clarke* (Lib); 5. **Rick Colless*** (Nat); 6. Catherine Cusack* (Lib); 7. Robyn Parker* (Lib); 8. Gerald Anderson (Nat); 9. Greg Hansen (Lib); 10. Rachel Creek (Lib); 11. Avis Kennedy (Nat); 12. David Poole (Lib); 13. Terence Tang (Lib); 14. Michael Darby (Lib); 15. Jeff Herdegen (Nat); 16. Coral Slattery (Lib); 17. Elizabeth Hill (Lib); 18. Dean Gillespie (Lib); 19. Nick de Stefani (Lib)	1. **Ian Cohen***; 2. Sylvia Hale*; 3. Carol Berry; 4. Jan Davis; 5. John Kaye; 6. Emelia Holdaway; 7. Mithra Cox; 8. Jeff Poole; 9. Imogen Schoots; 10. Alison Lyssa; 11. Philip Myers; 12. Judy Greenwood; 13. Wendy White; 14. Julie-Anne Richards; 15. Margaret Henry; 16. Cathy Rytmeister; 17. James Diack; 18. Kylie Hitchman; 19. Susan Jarnason; 20. Mora Main; 21. Stewart Jackson	1. **Gordon Moyes***; 2. Ross Clifford; 3. Peter Walker; 4. Graham McLennan; 5. George Capsis; 6. Alasdair Webster; 7. Kevin Hume; 8. Gamil Helmy-Kostandy; 9. Shirley Grigg; 10. Elwyn Sheppard; 11. Donald Baker; 12. Barry Small; 13. Beverly Pitt; 14. Warwick Copeland; 15. Ruth Nannelli	1. **John Tingle***; 2. Robert Brown; 3. Dan Field; 4. Suzanne O'Connell; 5. Robyn Bourke; 6. Jo Hall; 7. Joan Maraldo; 8. Don Stewart; 9. Jenny Coates; 10. Ali Ambs; 11. Roger Thwaites; 12. Kenneth Moore; 13. Klaus Schwartz; 14. Dave Cook; 15. John Howden; 16. Janos Beregszaszi; 17. Dal Birrell; 18. Neil McCosker; 19. Colin Fraser; 20. Leon Belgrave; 21. Darryl Cheal
One Nation NSW candidates	Democrats candidates	Unity candidates	Hanson candidates	RLS candidates
1. Brian Burston; 2. Graham Burston; 3. John Cantwell; 4. Mark Booth; 5. Rosalyn Wright; 6. Stuart McBeth; 7. Kevin Bristow; 8. James O'Brien; 9. Ricky Bailey; 10. Larissa Bailey; 11. Lyn Stackman; 12. Tristen Peden; 13. Edwin Farnsworth; 14. Patricia Vaughan; 15. Sylvia Haley; 16. Jillian Burnage	1. James Lantry; 2. Peter Furness; 3. Nina Burridge; 4. Matthew Baird; 5. Vicki Dimond; 6. Peter Zakrzewski; 7. Scilla Rosenberg; 8. Harry Boyle; 9. Pamela Clifford; 10. Sandy King; 11. Brian Day; 12. Theo Phillip; 13. Mary de Merindol; 14. Kate Botting; 15. Julian Swallow; 16. Carolyn McLean; 17. Roy Day; 18. Brenda Padgett; 19. Robyn Kirk	1. Ernest Wong; 2. Hanh Nguyen; 3. Robert Donnelly; 4. Victoria Paramonov; 5. Silma Ihram; 6. Shan Chin Su; 7. Melanie Vere; 8. Vannara Kim; 9. Jason Pham; 10. Parkcie Lam; 11. Thi Nga Tran; 12. Kam Leung; 13. Michael Tongsumrith; 14. Kit Fok; 15. Ping Law; 16. Wayne Yip; 17. Bich Le; 18. Nghiep Lu	1. Pauline Hanson; 2. Trevor Clarke; 3. Zojka Cleary; 4. Peter Carver; 5. Peter Sayegh; 6. John Rose; 7. Ray Wallis; 8. Philip Downey; 9. Colin Rogers; 10. Kay Earl; 11. Andy Frew; 12. Bill Healey; 13. Marian Hills; 14. Peter Fairall; 15. Noel Clarke; 16. Mark Marinkovich; 17. Michael Kordek	1. Ahmed Sokarno; 2. Mike Davis; 3. Valerie Murphy; 4. Antoinette Housego; 5. Wayne Lawrence; 6. Terry Hines; 7. Janette Warby; 8. Catherine Byrne; 9. Maree Breen; 10. Pam Laidler; 11. Elizabeth Thomas; 12. Arthur Kraulis; 13. Gustav Herstik; 14. Gordon The; 15. Terry Bell
Socialist candidates	AAFI candidates	FP/HRP/4WD candidates	SOS candidates	NPP candidates
1. Lisa Macdonald; 2. John Morris; 3. Raul Bassi; 4. Angela Budai; 5. Jamal Darwand; 6. Naomi Arrowsmith; 7. Darcy Byrne; 8. Michael Schembri; 9. Karol Florek; 10. Pip Hinman; 11. Kieran Latty; 12. Margaret Perrott; 13. Kylie Witt; 14. John Percy; 15. Ashisha Cunningham; 16. Geoff Payne; 17. Osama Yousif; 18. Angela Luvera; 19. Kim Bullimore; 20. Stephen O'Brien; 21. Jim Knight	1. Janey Woodger; 2. David Kitson; 3. Edwin Woodger; 4. Ken O'Leary; 5. Bob Girvan; 6. Peter James; 7. Frank Corrigan; 8. Roy Butler; 9. Hugh Watkins; 10. Craig Jeffriess; 11. Rex Dobson; 12. John Campbell; 13. Paul Higgins; 14. Tom Moody; 15. Kenneth Spragg	1. Robert Smith; 2. Glenn Druery; 3. Ruth Green; 4. Frank Sanzari; 5. David Wiseman; 6. Debra Avis; 7. Philip Gilham; 8. Stewart Paterson; 9. Fiona Meller; 10. David Bennis; 11. Deanne Shepherd; 12. Wendy Smallwood; 13. Dean Carpenter; 14. David Hitchcock; 15. Michelle Carpenter; 16. Steven Kaskaniotis; 17. Michael Butcher; 18. Graham Crossley; 19. Antonio Gabrielle; 20. Phillip Bell; 21. Chris Hodgson	1. Tony Recsei; 2. Noel Plumb; 3. Jean Lennane; 4. Marga van Gennip; 5. Giselle Mawer; 6. Rex Hill; 7. Ross Collins; 8. June Hefferan; 9. Pat Hancock; 10. Hugh Bennett; 11. Colin Audet; 12. Monica Wangmann; 13. Jean Posen; 14. Leigh Wallbank; 15. Carolyn O'Connell; 16. Leanne Gavagna; 17. Andrew Rider; 18. Bernard Laughlan; 19. Mary Minns; 20. Colin Freeman; 21. Ann Mills	1. Samir Bargashoun; 2. Mohammed Daher; 3. Mohamed Derbas; 4. Nivin El Kassir; 5. Maisa Samman; 6. Hussein El-Massri; 7. Mark Ekermawi; 8. Hala Sangari; 9. Mervet Abdallah; 10. Omar Samman; 11. Steven Ajaj; 12. Mariam Derbas; 13. Jennifer Lozi; 14. Norm Chalak; 15. Leila Hbous; 16. Steven Alameddine; 17. Fayez Mahfoud; 18. Ahmad Haddad; 19. Mahmoud Rashid; 20. Ahmed Ibrahim
Ungrouped candidates				
Alexandra Rivers; F Ivor; Brian Ellis; Simon Mitchell; Peter Consandine; Mary Mockler; Michael Middleton				

== See also ==
- Members of the New South Wales Legislative Assembly, 2003–2007
- Members of the New South Wales Legislative Council, 2003–2007
