= 1903 Tamworth state by-election =

Election result for Tamworth, New South Wales, Australia

A by-election was held for the New South Wales Legislative Assembly electorate of Tamworth on 4 April 1903 because of the bankruptcy of Raymond Walsh (Progressive).

== Dates ==
| Date | Event |
|---|---|
| 27 February 1903 | Raymond Walsh was made bankrupt. |
| 12 March 1903 | Writ of election issued by the Speaker of the Legislative Assembly. |
| 24 March 1903 | Nominations |
| 4 April 1903 | Polling day |
| 25 April 1903 | Return of writ |

== Results ==
1903 Tamworth by-election Saturday 4 April
| Party | Candidate | Votes | % | ±% |
|---|---|---|---|---|
| Liberal Reform | John Garland | 688 | 48.8 | +6.8 |
| Progressive | Raymond Walsh (Note: Raymond Walsh had been elected as an independent at the 1901 election, however he joined the Progressive Party for the by-election.) (defeated) | 551 | 39.1 | −5.6 |
| Labor | Thomas Thrower | 164 | 11.6 | |
| Independent | David Todd | 6 | 0.4 | |
| Total formal votes | | 1,409 | 99.1 | −0.3 |
| Informal votes | | 13 | 0.9 | +0.3 |
| Turnout | | 1,422 | 62.6 (Note: based on a roll of 2,270 at the 1901 election.) | −5.5 |
| Liberal Reform gain from Independent | | Swing | | |

== See also ==
- Electoral results for the district of Tamworth
- List of New South Wales state by-elections
