= 1889 Tamworth colonial by-election =

By-election in New South Wales, Australia

A by-election was held for the New South Wales Legislative Assembly electorate of Tamworth in June 1889 because of the resignation of Robert Levien (Protectionist). The Supreme Court had found Levien guilty of the dishonourable conduct of permitting his unqualified clerk to have acted as an attorney, fined him £100 and suspended him from practice for twelve months.

== Dates ==
Date	Event
31 May 1889	Decision of the Supreme Court handed down and Robert Levin resigned.
1 June 1889	Writ of election issued by the Speaker of the Legislative Assembly.
10 June 1889	Nominations
18 June 1889	Polling day
25 June 1889	Return of writ

== Results ==
1889 Tamworth by-election Tuesday 18 June
Party	Candidate	Votes	%	±%
Protectionist	Robert Levien (re-elected)	Unopposed		
Protectionist hold				

== See also ==
- Electoral results for the district of Tamworth
- List of New South Wales state by-elections
