= Electoral results for the district of Quirindi =

Election results for Quirindi, New South Wales, Australia

Quirindi, an electoral district of the Legislative Assembly in the Australian state of New South Wales was created in 1894 and abolished in 1904.

Election	Member	-
1894	Robert Levien	Protectionist
1895	Robert Levien	Protectionist
1898	Robert Levien	Independent
1901	Robert Levien	Progressive

== Election results ==
=== Elections in the 1900s ===
==== 1901 ====
1901 New South Wales state election: Quirindi
Party	Candidate	Votes	%	±%
Progressive	Robert Levien	808	58.5	+4.7
Liberal Reform	John Rodgers	380	27.5	
Labour	Hugh Ross	194	14.0	−30.3
Total formal votes		1,382	99.2	−0.1
Informal votes		11	0.8	+0.1
Turnout		1,393	59.8	−3.0
Member changed to Progressive from Independent				

=== Elections in the 1890s ===
==== 1898 ====
1898 New South Wales colonial election: Quirindi
Party	Candidate	Votes	%	±%
Independent	Robert Levien	645	53.8	
Labour	John Perry (b 1849)	532	44.4	
National Federal	William Clapin	22	1.8	
Total formal votes		1,199	99.3	
Informal votes		8	0.7	
Turnout		1,207	62.8	
Member changed to Independent from National Federal				

==== 1895 ====
1895 New South Wales colonial election: Quirindi
Party	Candidate	Votes	%	±%
Protectionist	Robert Levien	585	59.0	
Labour	John Perry (born 1849)	407	41.0	
Total formal votes		992	99.5	
Informal votes		5	0.5	
Turnout		997	59.5	
Protectionist hold				

==== 1894 ====
1894 New South Wales colonial election: Quirindi
Party	Candidate	Votes	%	±%
Protectionist	Robert Levien	635	47.9	
Labour	Ramsay McKillop	420	31.7	
Ind. Protectionist	W Hawker	220	16.6	
Free Trade	A J C Agassiz	33	2.5	
Ind. Free Trade	T S Grehan	17	1.3	
Total formal votes		1,325	92.9	
Informal votes		101	7.1	
Turnout		1,426	88.1	
Protectionist win		(new seat)		
