= 2003 New South Wales state election =

- 22 March 2003

All 93 seats in the New South Wales Legislative Assembly and 21 (of the 42) seats in the New South Wales Legislative Council 47 Assembly seats were needed for a majority
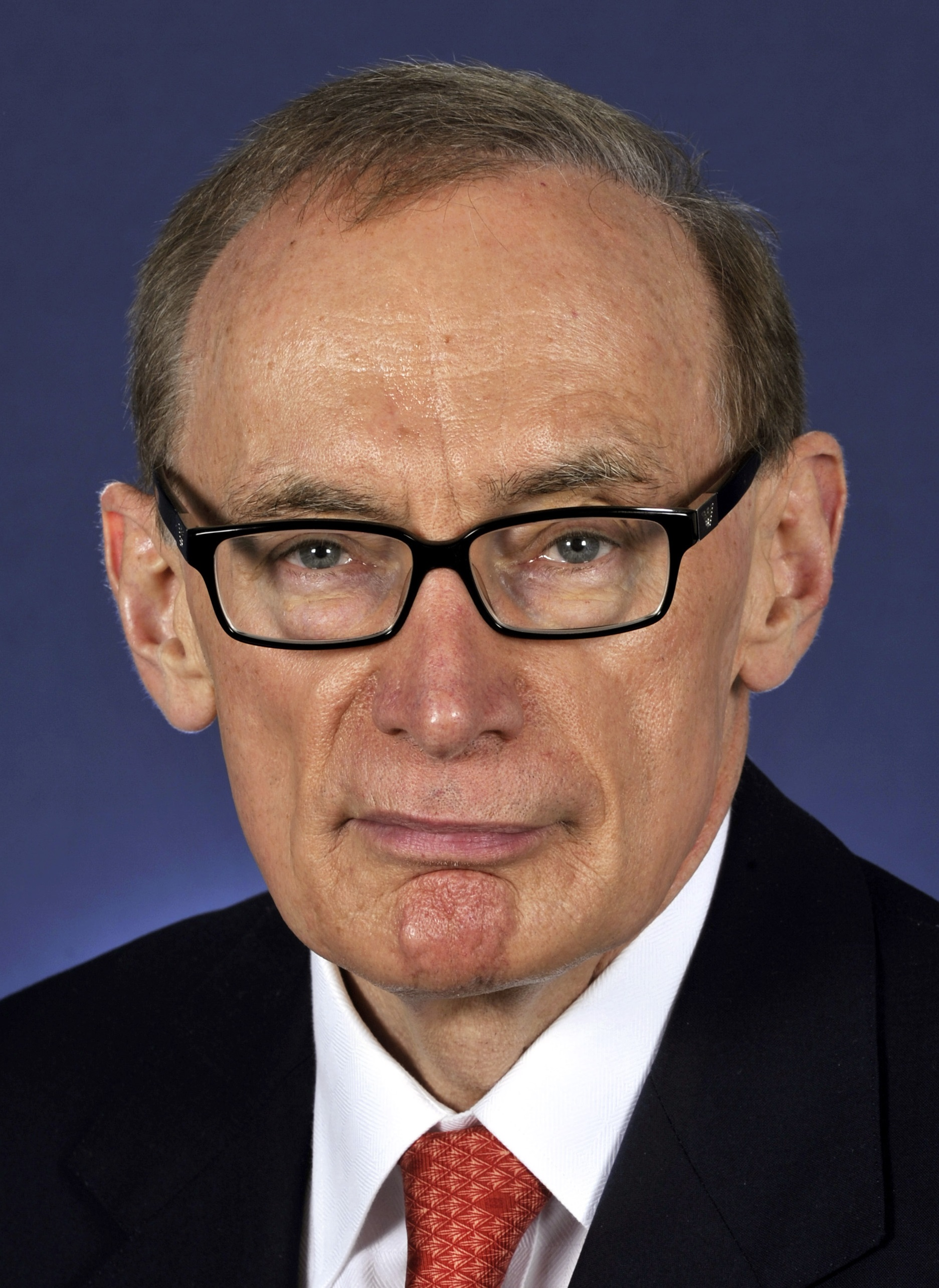

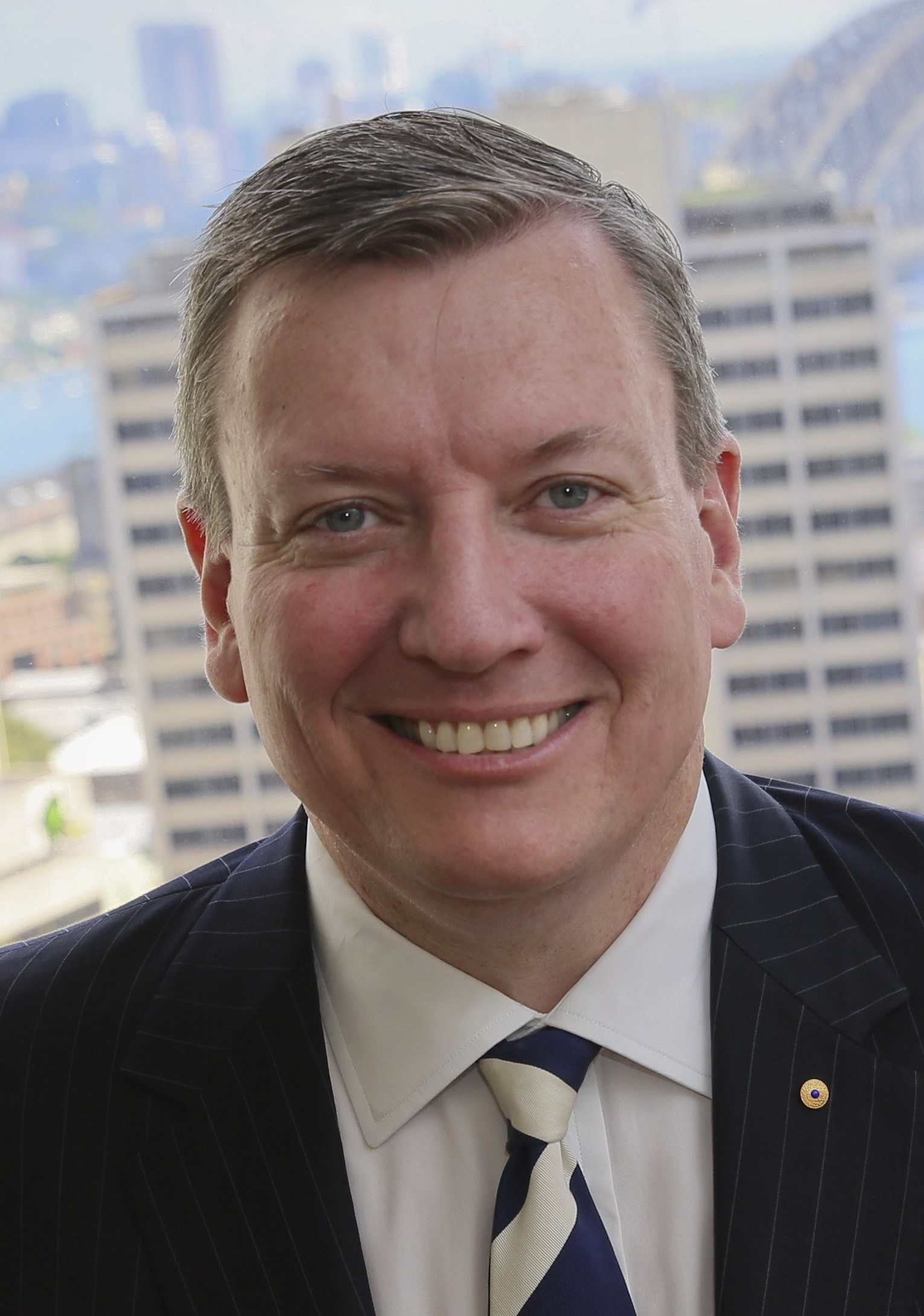
	First party	Second party
Leader	Bob Carr	John Brogden
Party	Labor	Liberal/National coalition
Leader since	6 April 1988	28 March 2002
Leader's seat	Maroubra	Pittwater
Last election	55 seats	33 seats
Seats won	55	32
Seat change	Steady	▼1
Popular vote	1,631,018	1,312,892
Percentage	42.68%	34.35%
Swing	▲0.47	▲0.66
TPP	56.18%	43.82%
TPP swing	▲0.22	▼0.22
- Two-candidate-preferred margin by electorate
Premier before election
Bob Carr
Labor
Elected Premier
Bob Carr
Labor

The 2003 New South Wales state election was held on Saturday 22 March 2003. All seats in the Legislative Assembly and half the seats in the Legislative Council were up for election. The Labor Party led by Bob Carr won a third four-year term against the Liberal–National Coalition led by John Brogden.

Future New South Wales premiers, Gladys Berejiklian and Kristina Keneally, entered parliament at this election.

This election saw the New South Wales division of the Liberal Party record its lowest ever primary vote at a state election.

== Background ==
In the 18 months following the 1999 election politics was swamped by the Olympics. The only problem in this period was an administrative disaster in organising the ballot to purchase tickets. Games organisers were trying to hold back tickets originally promised at a lower price to the public in an attempt to deal with the financial viability of the Olympics. Chikarovski remained as Liberal leader after the 1999 election, partly because no-one wanted the job before the Olympics, but also because there was no clear alternative. A challenge finally occurred in March 2002, and Pittwater MP John Brogden, after six years in Parliament, was elected to the leadership on his 33rd birthday.

After the Olympics, the Government faced two major problems. The first was the police. The Government had appointed an outsider, Englishman Peter Ryan, as new Commissioner to implement the reforms proposed by the Police Royal Commission. By 2001, police issues had moved on from corruption and returned to law and order, with the Government in particular under pressure over so-called "ethnic" crime in Western Sydney. Both Police Minister Paul Whelan and Commissioner Ryan were pushed into retiring, and new Minister Michael Costa was brought in to control the issue in the run-up to the 2003 election.

The second problem was the rail system. In a bid to create efficiencies, the Government had split the rail system into distinct organisations covering track, rolling stock, freight and passengers. Following a spate of accidents, including fatalities at Springwood in December 1999, a commission of inquiry was appointed. Its findings were that the accidents stemmed from confusion in the new structure of the rail system, and also a failure by the railway organisation to view safety as an operational goal. Another accident at Waterfall a month before the official start of the election campaign looked set to make rail safety a critical election issue, but the cause turned out to be the demise of the driver at the controls. Events after the election were to reveal major problems in the rail system, but they were not to become major issues in the campaign.

The 2003 election was almost a repeat of the 1999 result. The Liberal Party regained South Coast but lost the outer Sydney seat of Camden. The National Party regained Clarence with the retirement of Harry Woods, but lost Monaro to the Labor Party. Worse for the National Party, both Tamworth and Port Macquarie were lost to Independents: Tamworth after having been regained at a 2001 by-election, Port Macquarie after the decision of the National MP to leave the Party.

On the surface the result looked a repeat of 1999, but on closer analysis, Labor had increased its hold on Government. Despite a statewide two-party swing of just 0.2% to Labor, the party increased its margins in key seats. The seats clustered around the bottom of the electoral pendulum ahead of the 1999 election were now all safe seats for the Government. With another redistribution due before the next election in 2007 election, Labor appeared to have entrenched itself in power.

The election was the second to be fought by Carr as the incumbent Premier and became the first incumbent Premier to fight back to back elections since Neville Wran. To date Carr is also the last Premier to fight a second consecutive election.

In his concession speech Brogden promised that he will be back for the 2007 election but it was a promise that was not kept as he resigned as Liberal leader and then from Parliament in 2005.

== Electoral system ==
The New South Wales Legislative Assembly consists of 93 members, elected in single-member electorates by optional preferential voting.

The New South Wales Legislative Council consists of 42 members, elected at large by optional preferential single transferable voting, with 21 elected at each election to serve two Legislative Assembly terms.

Terms are fixed at four years, with elections being held in late March.

== Results ==
=== Overview ===
In the New South Wales Legislative Assembly:

- the Labor Party won 55 seats
- the Liberal Party won 20 seats
- the National Party won 12 seats
- independent candidates won 6 seats

Elections were held for half the seats in the New South Wales Legislative Council:

- the Labor Party won 10 seats for a total of 18
- the Liberal Party won 5 seats for a total of 9
- the National Party won 2 seats for a total of 4
- the Greens won 2 seats for a total of 3
- the Christian Democratic Party won 1 seat for a total of 2
- the Shooters Party won 1 seat for a total of 1
- the Australian Democrats won 0 seats for a total of 1
- One Nation NSW won 0 seats for a total of 1
- the Unity Party won 0 seats for a total of 1
- the Outdoor Recreation Party won 0 seats for a total of 1
- Reform the Legal System won 0 seats for a total of 1

=== Legislative Assembly ===
Party	Votes	%	+/–	Seats	+/–
Labor	1,631,018	42.68	▲0.47	55	Steady
Liberal	944,888	24.72	▼0.10	20	Steady
National	368,004	9.63	▲0.76	12	▼1
Greens	315,370	8.25	▲4.37	0	Steady
Independents	313,106	8.19	▲3.09	6	▲1
Christian Democrats	65,937	1.73	▲0.23	0	Steady
Unity	49,597	1.30	▲0.24	0	Steady
One Nation NSW	48,846	1.28	▼6.25	0	Steady
Democrats	35,477	0.93	▼2.40	0	Steady
Others	49,561	1.30	▼0.41	0	Steady
Total	3,821,804	100.00	–	93	–
Valid votes	3,821,804	97.38			
Invalid/blank votes	102,872	2.62	▲0.11		
Total votes	3,924,676	100.00	–		
Registered voters/turnout	4,272,104	91.87	▼1.25		
Source: NSW Elections - 2003 Results
Two-party-preferred
Labor	1,867,386	56.18	▼3.92		
Liberal/National	1,456,640	43.82	▲3.92		
Total	3,324,026	100.00	–		

Popular vote
Labor	42.68%
Liberal	24.72%
National	9.63%
Greens	8.25%
Independent	8.19%
Christian Democrats	1.73%
Unity	1.30%
One Nation	1.28%
Democrats	0.93%
Others	1.30%
Two-party-preferred vote
Labor	56.18%
Coalition	43.82%
Parliamentary seats
Labor	55
Liberal	20
National	12
Independent	6

=== Legislative Council ===
Party	Votes	%	+/–	Seats		
Party	Votes	%	+/–	Not Up	Won	Total seats
Labor	1,620,190	43.57	▲6.27	8	10	18
Liberal/National Coalition	1,239,107	33.32	▲5.91	6	7	13
Greens	320,010	8.61	▲5.69	1	2	3
Christian Democrats	112,865	3.04	▼0.14	1	1	2
Shooters	76,133	2.05	▲0.38	0	1	1
Hanson Group	71,386	1.92	New	New	0	0
Democrats	55,484	1.49	▼2.44	1	0	1
One Nation NSW	55,396	1.49	▼4.85	1	0	1
Unity	52,979	1.42	▲0.44	1	0	1
Fishing Party (& Associates)	39,315	1.06	▲0.85	0	0	0
Against Further Immigration	33,409	0.90	▲0.59	0	0	0
Save Our Suburbs	18,033	0.48	▲0.48	0	0	0
Legal System Reform	9,644	0.26	▼0.74	1	0	1
No Privatisation Peoples Party	6,652	0.18	▲0.12	0	0	0
Socialist Alliance	5,428	0.15	New	New	0	0
Independents	2,434	0.07	▲0.05	0	0	0
Outdoor Recreation				1	0	1
Total	3,718,465	100.00	–	21	21	42
Valid votes	3,718,465	94.66				
Invalid/blank votes	209,851	5.34	▼1.83			
Total votes	3,928,316	100.00	–			
Registered voters/turnout	4,272,104	91.95	▼1.11			
Source: NSW Legislative Council Elections 2003

== Seats changing hands ==
Seat	Pre-2003			Swing	Post-2003		
Seat	Party	Member	Margin	Swing	Margin	Member	Party
Camden	Liberal	Liz Kernohan	3.5	-8.9	5.4	Geoff Corrigan	Labor
Clarence	Labor	Harry Woods	0.2	-1.8	1.6	Steve Cansdell	National
Monaro	National	Peter Webb	0.2	-3.5	3.3	Steve Whan	Labor
South Coast	Labor	Wayne Smith	0.5	-3.3	2.8	Shelley Hancock	Liberal
Tamworth^{§}	National	John Cull	8.7	-11.2	2.5	Peter Draper	Independent

^{§} Tamworth was won by the Nationals in a 2001 by-election and the shown swing is based on it. At the 1999 election it was won by independent Tony Windsor.

- Members' names shown in italics did not recontest their seats.

== Post-election pendulum ==
Labor seats (55)
Marginal
Monaro	Steve Whan	ALP	3.3%
Tweed	Neville Newell	ALP	3.8%
Camden	Geoff Corrigan	ALP	5.4%
Fairly safe
Penrith	Karyn Paluzzano	ALP	6.1%
Murray-Darling	Peter Black	ALP	6.7%
Port Jackson	Sandra Nori	ALP	7.3% v GRN
Drummoyne	Angela D'Amore	ALP	8.7%
Heathcote	Paul McLeay	ALP	8.7%
Maitland	John Price	ALP	8.9%
Miranda	Barry Collier	ALP	9.1%
Port Stephens	John Bartlett	ALP	9.3%
Menai	Alison Megarrity	ALP	9.5%
The Entrance	Grant McBride	ALP	9.6%
Peats	Marie Andrews	ALP	9.7%
Safe
Marrickville	Andrew Refshauge	ALP	10.7% v GRN
Wyong	Paul Crittenden	ALP	11.1%
Coogee	Paul Pearce	ALP	12.6%
Parramatta	Tanya Gadiel	ALP	13.4%
Georges River	Kevin Greene	ALP	13.7%
Bathurst	Gerard Martin	ALP	14.1%
Lake Macquarie	Jeff Hunter	ALP	14.5%
Charlestown	Matthew Morris	ALP	14.7%
Blue Mountains	Bob Debus	ALP	14.8%
Newcastle	Bryce Gaudry	ALP	14.8%
Wentworthville	Pam Allan	ALP	14.8%
Londonderry	Allan Shearan	ALP	15.3% v IND
Cessnock	Kerry Hickey	ALP	15.5%
Ryde	John Watkins	ALP	15.5%
Strathfield	Virginia Judge	ALP	15.8%
Rockdale	Frank Sartor	ALP	15.9%
Riverstone	John Aquilina	ALP	16.1%
Kiama	Matt Brown	ALP	16.9%
Wollongong	Noreen Hay	ALP	17.3% v IND
Mulgoa	Diane Beamer	ALP	17.9%
East Hills	Alan Ashton	ALP	18.5%
Kogarah	Cherie Burton	ALP	19.2%
Granville	Kim Yeadon	ALP	19.5%
Campbelltown	Graham West	ALP	19.6%
Wallsend	John Mills	ALP	20.7%
Macquarie Fields	Craig Knowles	ALP	22.5%
Keira	David Campbell	ALP	22.5% v GRN
Maroubra	Bob Carr	ALP	23.5%
Heffron	Kristina Keneally	ALP	23.9%
Blacktown	Paul Gibson	ALP	24.5%
Illawarra	Marianne Saliba	ALP	24.8%
Mount Druitt	Richard Amery	ALP	26.8%
Fairfield	Joe Tripodi	ALP	27.0%
Auburn	Barbara Perry	ALP	27.3%
Lakemba	Morris Iemma	ALP	27.4%
Canterbury	Linda Burney	ALP	27.6%
Smithfield	Carl Scully	ALP	27.8%
Bankstown	Tony Stewart	ALP	28.6%
Liverpool	Paul Lynch	ALP	30.7%
Cabramatta	Reba Meagher	ALP	31.7%

Liberal/National seats (32)
Marginal
Willoughby	Gladys Berejiklian	LIB	0.2% v IND
Gosford	Chris Hartcher	LIB	0.3%
Clarence	Steve Cansdell	NAT	1.6%
South Coast	Shelley Hancock	LIB	2.8%
Hornsby	Judy Hopwood	LIB	3.1%
Lane Cove	Anthony Roberts	LIB	3.2%
Bega	Andrew Constance	LIB	3.9%
Burrinjuck	Katrina Hodgkinson	NAT	4.1%
Baulkham Hills	Wayne Merton	LIB	5.9%
Fairly safe
Epping	Andrew Tink	LIB	6.9%
Coffs Harbour	Andrew Fraser	NAT	6.9% v IND
Orange	Russell Turner	NAT	7.1%
Southern Highlands	Peta Seaton	LIB	7.6%
Ballina	Don Page	NAT	9.0%
Cronulla	Malcolm Kerr	LIB	9.3%
Safe
Oxley	Andrew Stoner	NAT	10.0%
Vaucluse	Peter Debnam	LIB	10.3%
Albury	Greg Aplin	LIB	11.5% v IND
The Hills	Michael Richardson	LIB	11.6%
North Shore	Jillian Skinner	LIB	12.3%
Wakehurst	Brad Hazzard	LIB	12.7%
Upper Hunter	George Souris	NAT	12.7%
Lismore	Thomas George	NAT	12.8%
Wagga Wagga	Daryl Maguire	LIB	13.7%
Hawkesbury	Steven Pringle	LIB	14.1%
Myall Lakes	John Turner	NAT	15.4%
Barwon	Ian Slack-Smith	NAT	16.2%
Murrumbidgee	Adrian Piccoli	NAT	17.8%
Davidson	Andrew Humpherson	LIB	19.7%
Pittwater	John Brogden	LIB	20.1%
Lachlan	Ian Armstrong	NAT	21.2%
Ku-ring-gai	Barry O'Farrell	LIB	21.6%
Crossbench seats (6)
Manly	David Barr	IND	1.3% v LIB
Tamworth	Peter Draper	IND	2.5% v NAT
Dubbo	Tony McGrane	IND	5.0% v NAT
Bligh	Clover Moore	IND	14.7% v ALP
Northern Tablelands	Richard Torbay	IND	32.4% v NAT
Port Macquarie	Rob Oakeshott	IND	32.8% v NAT

== See also ==
- Candidates of the 2003 New South Wales state election
- Post-election pendulum for the 2003 New South Wales state election
