= Attorney General Garland =

Attorney General Garland may refer to:

- Augustus Hill Garland (1832–1899), Attorney General of the United States
- John Garland (Australian politician) (1862–1921), Attorney General of New South Wales
- Merrick Garland (born 1952), Attorney General of the United States
