= Dungowan =

- Town
- Coordinates: 31°12′54″S 151°7′4″E
- Country: Australia
- State: New South Wales
- LGA: Tamworth Regional Council
- Location: 411 km (255 mi) N of Sydney; 23 km (14 mi) SE of Tamworth

Government
  - State electorate: Tamworth
  - Federal division: New England

Population
  - Total: 366 (2021 census)
- Postcode: 2340

Dungowan is a village in the New England region of New South Wales, Australia. It is located 23 km (14 mi) southeast of Tamworth. At the 2021 census, Dungowan had a population of 366.

== History ==
Dungowan was first gazetted on 10 May 1974.

== Notable people ==
Politician Peter Draper has resided in Dungowan since 1984.

Jack Todd, a current NRL player for the Canterbury Bulldogs
