= Post-election pendulum for the 2003 New South Wales state election =

The Mackerras New South Wales election pendulum, 2005 shows the state of the major political parties ahead of the 2007 New South Wales state election. The table shows seats in the New South Wales Legislative Assembly arranged in the form of a Mackerras pendulum. The figures have been calculated on the basis of a redistribution completed in 2005.

A uniform swing against the incumbent Labor Party government would deliver seats on the left of the table to the opposition Liberal and National parties. A swing in the government's favour would deliver seats on the right of the table to Labor.

MPs shown in italics did not contest the 2007 election.

== Very safe seats ==
District	Member	Party	Margin	District	Member	Party	Margin
Port Maccquarie	Rob Oakeshott	Independent	31.9 points
Cabramatta	Reba Meagher	Labor	31.8 points
Marrickville	Carmel Tebbutt	Labor	31.6 points
Liverpool	Paul Lynch	Labor	30.8 points
Northern Tablelands	Richard Torbay	Independent	30.0 points
Lakemba	Morris Iemma	Labor	28.8 points
Canterbury	Linda Burney	Labor	27.6 points
Wollongong	Noreen Hay	Labor	27.4 points
Shellharbour	Marianne Saliba	Labor	27.0 points
Mount Druitt	Richard Amery	Labor	26.8 points
Auburn	Barbara Perry	Labor	26.5 points
Bankstown	Tony Stewart	Labor	26.4 points
Fairfield	Joe Tripodi	Labor	26.0 points
Smithfield	Carl Scully	Labor	25.9 points
Blacktown	Paul Gibson	Labor	24.9 points
Keira	David Campbell	Labor	24.0 points
Heffron	Kristina Keneally	Labor	23.9 points
Maroubra	Michael Daley	Labor	23.5 points
Macquarie Fields	Steven Chaytor	Labor	22.6 points	Albury	Greg Aplin	Liberal	22.5 points
Wallsend	John Mills	Labor	20.1 points	Davidson	Andrew Humpherson	Liberal	20.9 points

== Safe seats ==
District	Member	Party	Margin	District	Member	Party	Margin
Campbelltown	Graham West	Labor	19.6 points
Granville	Kim Yeadon	Labor	19.4 points
Kogarah	Cherie Burton	Labor	19.3 points
East Hills	Alan Ashton	Labor	18.6 points
Cessnock	Kerry Hickey	Labor	18.5 points
Balmain	Sandra Nori	Labor	17.6 points
Swansea	Vacant	Labor	17.1 points
Toongabbie	Pam Allan	Labor	16.7 points
Mulgoa	Diane Beamer	Labor	16.6 points
Rockdale	Frank Sartor	Labor	16.0 points
Newcastle	Bryce Gaudry	Labor	15.4 points	Murrumbidgee	Adrian Piccoli	National	18.9 points
Strathfield	Virginia Judge	Labor	14.9 points	Ku-ring-gai	Barry O'Farrell	Liberal	18.8 points
Blue Mountains	Bob Debus	Labor	14.8 points	Sydney	Clover Moore	Independent	15.0 points
Ryde	John Watkins	Labor	14.7 points	Barwon	Ian Slack-Smith	National	14.7 points
Oatley	Kevin Greene	Labor	14.2 points	Hawkesbury	Steven Pringle	Liberal	14.6 points
Parramatta	Tanya Gadiel	Labor	13.5 points	Myall Lakes	John Turner	National	13.9 points
Bathurst	Gerard Martin	Labor	13.4 points	Wakehurst	Brad Hazzard	Liberal	13.2 points
Charlestown	Matthew Morris	Labor	13.3 points	Wagga Wagga	Daryl Maguire	Liberal	12.7 points
Coogee	Paul Pearce	Labor	13.2 points	Burrinjuck	Katrina Hodgkinson	National	12.4 points
Riverstone	John Aquilina	Labor	13.1 points	North Shore	Jillian Skinner	Liberal	12.3 points
Heathcote	Paul McLeay	Labor	12.3 points	Coffs Harbour	Andrew Fraser	National	11.9 points
Wyong	Paul Crittenden	Labor	12.2 points	Vaucluse	Peter Debnam	Liberal	10.9 points
Lake Macquarie	Jeff Hunter	Labor	11.6 points	Castle Hill	Michael Richardson	Liberal	10.8 points

== Fairly safe seats ==
District	Member	Party	Margin	District	Member	Party	Margin
Maitland	John Price	Labor	9.8 points
The Entrance	Grant McBride	Labor	9.6 points
Miranda	Barry Collier	Labor	8.9 points
Drummoyne	Angela D'Amore	Labor	8.8 points
Menai	Alison Megarrity	Labor	8.4 points	Oxley	Andrew Stoner	National	9.7 points
Camden	Geoff Corrigan	Labor	8.3 points	Ballina	Don Page	National	9.1 points
Londonderry	Allan Shearan	Labor	8.2 points	Cronulla	Malcolm Kerr	Liberal	8.6 points
Gosford	Marie Andrews	Labor	8.2 points	Lismore	Thomas George	National	8.1 points
Kiama	Matt Brown	Labor	8.1 points	Epping	Andrew Tink	Liberal	7.6 points
Port Stephens	John Bartlett	Labor	7.2 points	Willoughby	Gladys Berejiklian	Liberal	7.4 points
Penrith	Karyn Paluzzano	Labor	6.6 points	Upper Hunter	George Souris	National	7.2 points

== Marginal seats ==
District	Member	Party	Margin	District	Member	Party	Margin
				Orange	Russell Turner	National	5.9 points
				Clarence	Steve Cansdell	National	5.3 points
				Bega	Andrew Constance	Liberal	4.7 points
Pittwater	Alex McTaggart	Independent	5.4 points	Goulburn	Peta Seaton	Liberal	4.5 points
Wollondilly	New seat	Labor	4.6 points	Hornsby	Judy Hopwood	Liberal	4.2 points
Monaro	Steve Whan	Labor	4.4 points	Baulkham Hills	Wayne Merton	Liberal	4.0 points
Tweed	Neville Newell	Labor	4.0 points	Lane Cove	Anthony Roberts	Liberal	2.8 points
Tamworth	Peter Draper	Independent	1.9 points	South Coast	Shelley Hancock	Liberal	1.6 points
Manly	David Barr	Independent	1.2 points	Murray-Darling	Peter Black	Labor	−1.4 points
Dubbo	Dawn Fardell	Independent	0.3 points	Terrigal	Chris Hartcher	Liberal	0.6 points

== Independents ==
A version of the table published in The Australian on 19 February 2007 showed all seats as effectively Coalition or Labor depending on the favoured major party among the electorate's voters. On this interpretation, Clover Moore's seat of Sydney is shown on the government side, alone among the seven sitting independents.
