= Michael Burke (New South Wales colonial politician) =

Australian politician

Michael Burke (11 October 1843 – 21 March 1909) was an Australian politician.

He was born at Tamworth to shepherd Thomas Burke and Margaret Dwyer. He was a carpenter and possibly a policeman before entering politics. On 20 September 1866 he married Catherine Agnes Leahy, with whom he had six children (one of these was Frank Burke, later Speaker of the New South Wales Legislative Assembly). In 1885 he was elected to the New South Wales Legislative Assembly for Tamworth, but he did not re-contest in 1887. Burke died at Newtown in 1909.

New South Wales Legislative Assembly
Preceded by John Gill	Member for Tamworth; 1885–1887; Served alongside: Robert Levien	Succeeded by William Dowel
