= 1940 Tamworth state by-election =

Election result for Tamworth, New South Wales, Australia

A by-election was held for the New South Wales Legislative Assembly electorate of Tamworth on 10 August 1940 because of the death of Frank Chaffey (United Australia).

The UAP held a five-way preselection which was won by Chaffey's son, Bill Chaffey, a farmer who had returned to the district about twelve months previously. He won preselection over Tamworth station agent P. Marsh, grazier and Peel River Shire councillor J. Scott, Tamworth grain expert W. H. Lye and former federal MP Roland Green. The Country Party did not contest the seat after forming an agreement with the UAP, mindful of the UAP having not contested an earlier by-election in the Country Party-held seat of Upper Hunter. Two Labor parties contested the seat as a result of the second Lang Labor split: insurance agent and future MP Thomas Ryan (for the Labor Party (Non-Communist)) and solicitor John Lyons (for the official Labor Party).

Chaffey comfortably won the seat with a majority of the primary vote.

== Dates ==
Date	Event
9 July 1940	Death of Frank Chaffey.
19 July 1940	Writ of election issued by the Speaker of the Legislative Assembly.
25 July 1940	Nominations
10 August 1940	Polling day
24 August 1940	Return of writ

== Results ==
1940 Tamworth by-election Saturday 10 August
Party	Candidate	Votes	%	±%
United Australia	Bill Chaffey (Note: Bill Chaffey was the son of former member Frank Chaffey.)	6,850	54.6	−5.4
Labor (N-C)	Thomas Ryan	2,958	23.6	
Labor	John Lyons	2,737	21.8	−12.3
Total formal votes		12,545	98.9	+0.5
Informal votes		142	1.1	−0.5
Turnout		12,687	87.9	−6.3
United Australia hold		Swing	−5.4	

== See also ==
- Electoral results for the district of Tamworth
- List of New South Wales state by-elections
