= 2001 Tamworth state by-election =

Election result for Tamworth, New South Wales, Australia

A by-election was held for the New South Wales Legislative Assembly electorate of Tamworth on 8 December 2001 because Tony Windsor (Independent) resigned to successfully contest the federal seat of New England at the 2001 election.

== Results ==
2001 Tamworth by-election Saturday 8 December
Party	Candidate	Votes	%	±%
National	John Cull	14,293	36.34	+24.77
Independent	James Treloar	8,934	22.72	
Independent	Warren Woodley	5,897	15.00	
Labor	Ray Tait	5,831	14.83	+0.06
Independent	Ken McKenzie	2,775	7.06	
Democrats	Marie Cowling	771	1.96	
Independent	Clint Kelly	466	1.18	
Independent	Andre Fritze	359	0.91	
Total formal votes		39,326	98.17	−0.57
Informal votes		735	1.83	+0.57
Turnout		40,061	90.14	−4.23
Two-candidate-preferred result
National	John Cull	19,862	58.68	
Independent	James Treloar	13,984	41.32	
National gain from Independent		Swing		

== See also ==
- Electoral results for the district of Tamworth
- List of New South Wales state by-elections
