= John Gill (Australian politician) =

Irish-born Australian politician

John Gill (15 September 1823 – 25 January 1889) was an Irish-born Australian politician.

He was born in Newtownstewart in County Tyrone to merchant Jeremiah Gill and his wife Mary Jane. He arrived in New South Wales in 1842 and worked as a labourer in Singleton. Around 1849 he married Mary Jane Sherwood, with whom he had five children. Now running a coaching business, he also acquired squatting runs near Tamworth also property around New England and the Liverpool Plains. In 1882 he was elected to the New South Wales Legislative Assembly for Tamworth, but he was defeated in 1885. He died at Rockvale in 1889.

New South Wales Legislative Assembly
Preceded by Sydney Burdekin	Member for Tamworth; 1882–1885; Served alongside: Robert Levien	Succeeded by Michael Burke
