= William Dowel =

English-born Australian politician

William Springthorpe Dowel (1837 – 25 November 1905) was an English-born Australian politician.

He was born at Hammersmith in Kent to stonemason David Dowel and Elizabeth Springthorpe. The family moved to New South Wales around 1841. Dowel was farming at Tamworth by 1860, and around 1863 he married Elizabeth Lloyd, with whom he had three children. In 1887 he was elected to the New South Wales Legislative Assembly as the member for Tamworth; a Protectionist, he served until his defeat in 1894. He then moved to Queensland, where he became a mining surveyor and unsuccessfully contested the state seat of Herberton. He died at Herberton in 1905.

New South Wales Legislative Assembly
Preceded by Michael Burke	Member for Tamworth; 1887–1894; Served alongside: Robert Levien	Succeeded by George Dibbs
