= Noel Park (politician) =

Australian politician

Ernest Noel Park OAM, known as Noel Park (5 December 1920 – 16 September 1994) was an Australian soldier, grazier and politician, affiliated with the National Party and elected as a member of the New South Wales Legislative Assembly.

Park served as the Member for Tamworth between 1973 and 1991.

In the 1995 Australia Day Honours Park was posthumously award the Medal of the Order of Australia for "service to the New South Wales Parliament and to the community".

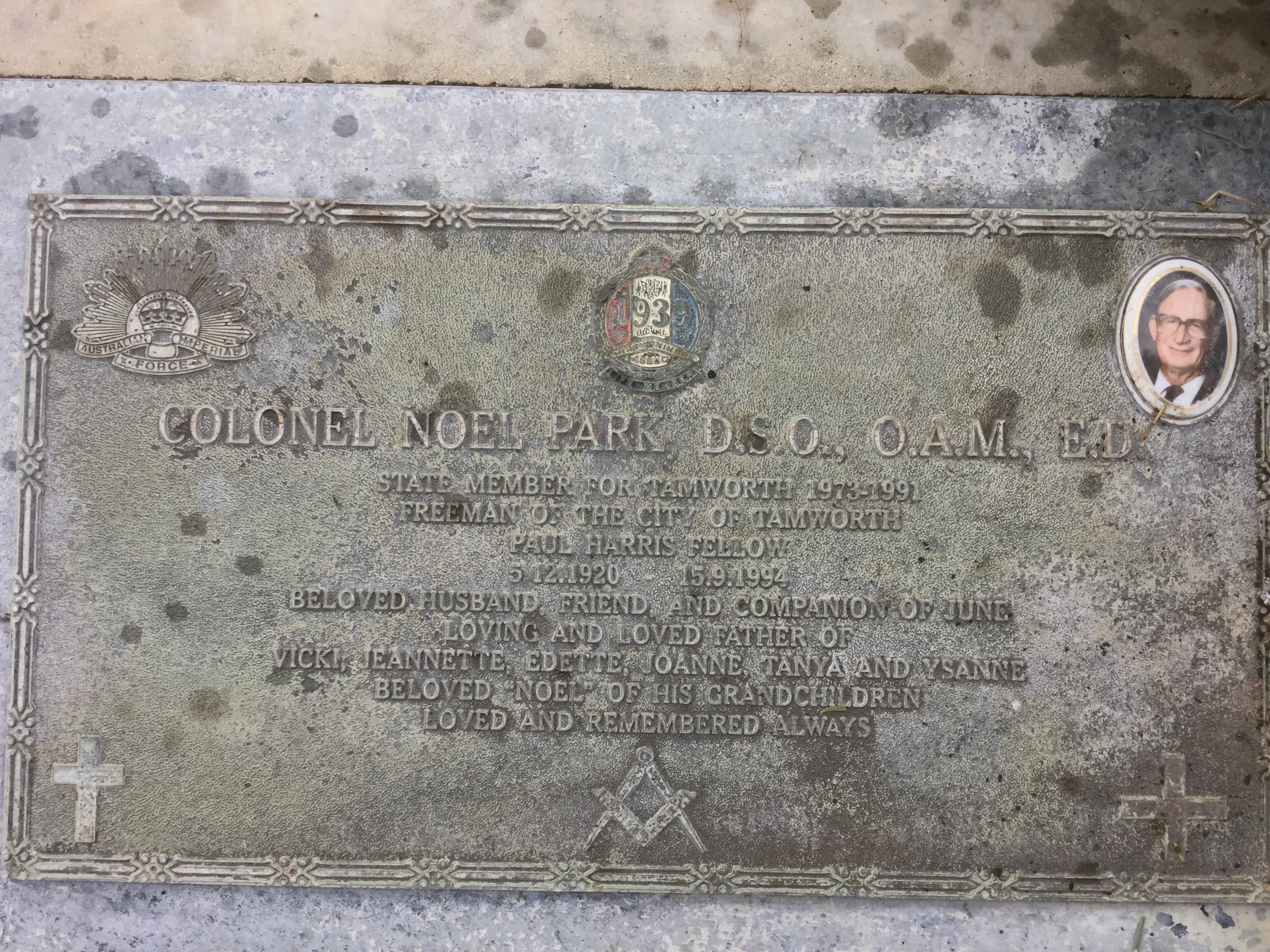
Photograph of the grave of Noel Park, D.S.O., O.A.M., E.D.

New South Wales Legislative Assembly
Preceded by Bill Chaffey	Member for Tamworth; 1973–1991	Succeeded by Tony Windsor
