= Christine Robertson =

Australian politician

Member of Legislative Council of New South Wales
- In office 22 March 2003 – 4 March 2011

Personal details
- Born: 5 October 1948 (age 78) Wollongong, New South Wales, Australia
- Party: Labor Party

Christine Mary Robertson (born 5 October 1948) is an Australian politician and former Labor Party member of the New South Wales Legislative Council, serving from 2003 until her retirement in 2011.

Robertson was born on 5 October 1948 in Wollongong to Walter Edward Carr and Diana Ida McGinness. She attended various primary schools in New South Wales, such as East Tamworth Primary School. She completed her secondary studies at J J Cahill Memorial High School in 1965. She sought a career in nursing and obtained a General Nursing Training Certificate in 1969. She worked as a Registered Nurse at various hospitals including, Royal Prince Alfred Hospital, Royal South Sydney Hospital, Royal North Shore Hospital, St. Vincent's Hospital and Tamworth Base Hospital. She pursued further studies in nursing and obtained a Bachelor of Health Science in 1990 from Charles Sturt University.

She became a Health Education officer in 1986 and in 1997 became the Manager, and then the Director of Population Health for the New England Area Health Service. In 1998 she became the Director of the New England Area Health Service Research Institute and in 2003 became the Chair of the Australian Rural Health Research Collaboration Advisory Council.

She joined the Tamworth Branch of the Australian Labor Party in 1980. She became the President of the Tamworth Base Hospital Branch of the NSW Nurses Association in the same year. She became its Secretary in 1982 and then its president in 1991, and then the Senior Vice President in 1998. She became a member of the Administrative Committee in 1995. She succeeded Garry Ryan to become the Secretary of the Rural and Provincial Affairs Committee from 1986 to 1990, and then its chair until 1999, and continued as Chair of the Country Labor Committee. She was a Delegate to the National ALP Conference in 1991 and has been a delegate for every conference thereafter. In 1996 she became the Secretary of the Tamworth Subbranch of the Health Services Union. She is now a partner in a farming and small business.

She first stood as a candidate for the Australian Labor Party in the 1991 and 1995 New South Wales elections in the seat of Tamworth against Independent Tony Windsor. She then stood for the Legislative Council in the 2003 election. She was placed eighth on the Labor Party Group ticket. She received the 16th highest quota at that election, and was elected to serve an eight-year term in the council.

In Parliament she has been a member of the Joint Select Committee on the Threatened Species Conservation Amendment (Biodiversity Banking) Bill 2006, a member of the General Purpose Standing Committee, a member of the Standing Committee on State Development, and a member of the committee on the Health Care Complaints Commission.

She was appointed a Temporary Chair of Committees in 2003 and held that role until 2007. She was also the Legislative Council Representative on the Council of the University of New England in 2003 and 2004.

On 1 August 2004 Robertson was traveling in a car on the road outside of Tingha when a vehicle traveling on the wrong side of the road collided with her vehicle. Passers-by removed her from the car prior to the other car bursting into flames. Ambulance officers transported her to Inverell District Hospital for treatment. Robertson said that she had no memory of the accident, nor of the two weeks after the incident, but praised medical staff for her treatment.

She is currently the chair of the Standing Committee on Law and Justice. The committee delivered a report on court proceedings involving children criminal defendants. The committee recommended that the names of children who commit crimes should continue to be suppressed so the "stigma of being associated with a crime" would not get in the way of the child's future rehabilitation

In 2008, Robertson came out in support of besieged Federal politician Belinda Neal signing an open letter with eight other female politicians condemning the media over their treatment of Neal.

On the first day of the new Rees Government, she asked a Dorothy Dixer question but addressed it to the wrong Government Minister.

She is married to Richard and has two sons. The media attempted to implicate her when her husband allegedly cut down trees without authority on their country property with the Sydney Daily Telegraph disrespecting her husband by calling him her partner instead of her husband.
