= Frank Chaffey =

Australian politician

The Honourable Captain Frank Chaffey

Member of the New South Wales Parliament for Tamworth and Namoi
- In office 20 December 1913 – 9 July 1940
- Preceded by: Robert Levien
- Succeeded by: Bill Chaffey

Personal details
- Born: 31 March 1888 Moonbi, Colony of New South Wales
- Died: 9 July 1940 (aged 52) Rose Bay, New South Wales, Australia
- Party: United Australia
- Other political affiliations: Liberal Reform; Nationalist
- Spouse: Amy Stella McIlveen
- Relations: Bill Chaffey (son)
- Children: 2 sons, 4 daughters
- Occupation: Politician

Military service
- Allegiance: Australia
- Branch/service: Australian Imperial Force
- Years of service: 1915–1919
- Rank: Captain
- Unit: 1st Light Horse Brigade
- Battles/wars: World War I

Captain Frank Augustus Chaffey (31 March 1888 – 9 July 1940) was an Australian politician.

He was born at Moonbi to farmer William Adolphus Chaffey and Amelia, née Chad. He was educated at Nemingha and Tamworth before attending Hawkesbury Agricultural College, after which he worked on the family dairy farm. He studied at Sydney Technical College from 1907 and worked as a woolclasser briefly before returning to Tamworth to run the farm. He was active in the Farmers' and Settlers' Association of New South Wales. On 1 May 1912 he married Amy Stella McIlveen, with whom he had six children. During World War I he served with the 1st Light Horse Brigade and from 1918 to 1919 was Director of Education of the Australian Infantry Forces.

Chaffey was elected to the New South Wales Legislative Assembly in 1913 as the Liberal member for Tamworth. When proportional representation was introduced in 1920 (by which time the Liberal Party had become the Nationalist Party), he became one of the members for Namoi, but he returned to his old seat when single-member electorates were re-introduced in 1927. He was Assistant Minister for Lands and Agriculture from April 1922 until June, when he became full Minister, serving until 1925; he later served as Secretary for Mines and Minister for Forests (1927–1929) and Colonial Secretary (1929–38).

On 9 July 1940, Chaffey died of a coronary occlusion at his Sydney home in Rose Bay, New South Wales. Premier Alexander Mair spoke after his death that "The State has lost a splendid citizen of the highest worth. As a Member of the Legislative Assembly and a former Cabinet Minister, and as a private citizen he was held in the highest esteem" and that; "His career was one of the longest in the history of the State. He showed outstanding capacity as an administrator." Chaffey was cremated at Northern Suburbs Crematorium following a private service which was held at St Michael's Church, Vaucluse. He was succeeded in Parliament as the member for Tamworth by his son, Bill.

Chaffey Dam, a large freshwater dam on the Peel River north of Tamworth, New South Wales is named after both Frank and Bill Chaffey.

New South Wales Legislative Assembly
Preceded by Robert Levien	Member for Tamworth; 1913–1920	Succeeded by Seat abolished
Preceded by Walter Wearne	Member for Namoi; 1920–1927; Served alongside: P. Scully/W. Scully, Wearne	Succeeded by William Scully
Preceded by New seat	Member for Tamworth; 1927–1940	Succeeded by Bill Chaffey
