= Bill Chaffey =

Australian politician

Major Bill Chaffey

Member of the New South Wales Parliament for Tamworth
- In office 10 August 1940 – 19 October 1973
- Preceded by: Frank Chaffey
- Succeeded by: Noel Park

Personal details
- Born: February 18, 1915 Tamworth, New South Wales, Australia
- Died: March 4, 1987 (aged 72) Tamworth, New South Wales, Australia
- Party: Independent
- Other political affiliations: United Australia; Country
- Spouse: Patricia Egerton-Warburton (m. 29 January 1946)
- Relations: Frank Chaffey (father)
- Children: 1 son, 2 daughters

Military service
- Allegiance: Australia
- Branch/service: Australian Army; Second Australian Imperial Force
- Years of service: 1941–1945
- Rank: Major
- Unit: 2/5th Commando Squadron; Z Special Unit
- Battles/wars: World War II; Papua New Guinea; French Indochina; Borneo campaign

Major William Adolphus Chaffey (18 February 1915 – 4 March 1987) was an Australian farmer, distinguished soldier and long serving member of the Parliament of New South Wales.

Chaffey represented the electoral district of Tamworth from 1940 to 1973. He also served as the New South Wales Minister for Agriculture from 1965 to 1968. Chaffey succeeded his father, Frank in parliament after the latter's death, and together they served a combined fifty-nine years and nine months in the New South Wales parliament representing the New England region of New South Wales.

== Biography ==
William Adolphus Chaffey was born in Tamworth, New South Wales on 18 February 1915 to Frank Augustus Chaffey, himself a member of the New South Wales Legislative Assembly, and Amy McIlveen. He was educated at Tamworth Public School, The King's School, and Hawkesbury Agricultural College. He subsequently returned to the Tamworth district and began farming there before his election to parliament.

On 16 December 1941, in his first term in parliament, he joined the Australian Imperial Force. He served in the 2/5th Independent Company, and was twice mentioned in despatches, as well as winning the United States' Bronze Star Medal. In 1948, he became a member of the Australian Citizens Military Forces, remaining there until 1961.

On 29 January 1946 William Adolphus Chaffey married Patricia Egerton-Warburton at Mount Barker. They would eventually have two daughters and one son.

== In politics ==
On the death of his father, Frank Augustus Chaffey, William won his father's seat at the 1940 Tamworth by-election, as a member of the United Australia Party. In 1941, he was challenged for UAP preselection; however, like his father, who had never submitted to a party preselection vote, he refused to submit to an internal preselection contest. He instead contested and won the seat against his challenger as an independent. He was then re-elected unopposed in 1944 as an independent due to his active military service, having enlisted in 1941. He remained an independent until he formally joined the Country Party on 4 December 1945.

Chaffey was the deputy leader of the Country Party from 1959 to 1968. He was Minister for Agriculture in the first term of the Askin government from 1965 to 1968. He was deposed as deputy leader by Davis Hughes in 1968 and dropped from the ministry in the aftermath, despite the support of the Primary Producers' Union. Always known for being independently minded, Chaffey was reported to have become increasingly estranged from his Country Party colleagues after his 1968 ouster. On 21 September 1972, he resigned from the Country Party when the government of which it was part refused to discuss a motion he had put forward concerning parliamentary security. He continued as an independent until his retirement at the 1973 New South Wales state election.

Chaffey was an Honorary Vice President of the Royal Agricultural Society of New South Wales. Chaffey died in Tamworth on 3 March 1987 and was cremated. Chaffey Dam, a large freshwater dam on the Peel River north of Tamworth, New South Wales is named after both Bill and his father Frank. He was a Freemason.

== See also ==
- New South Wales Legislative Assembly

New South Wales Legislative Assembly
Preceded by Frank Chaffey	Member for Tamworth; 1940–1973	Succeeded by Noel Park
Party political offices
Preceded by Sir Charles Cutler	Deputy Leader of the New South Wales Country Party; 1959–1968	Succeeded by Davis Hughes
Political offices
Preceded by George Enticknap	Minister for Agriculture; 1964–1968	Succeeded by Geoff Crawford
