= John Cull =

Australian politician (1951–2022)

John Douglas Cull (23 January 1951 – 10 January 2022), a former Australian politician, was a member of the New South Wales Legislative Assembly representing the rural seat of Tamworth from the 2001 by-election until 2003 for the National Party.

== Early years and background ==
Cull attended Newington College (1962–1969), commencing as a preparatory school student in Wyvern House. He owned and ran a large grain property at Curlewis for much of his career. In the early 1980s, he also opened a franchise business called New England Retailing, operating four franchises of national chains in Armidale and Tamworth. After leaving the cattle business in the early 1990s, he owned and ran the Angus and Robertson book store in Tamworth.

Cull married Susan Jane Hughes at Gunnedah on 1 June 1974. They had one son and one daughter. He died on 10 January 2022.

== Political career ==
A long-time member of the National Party, Cull was preselected at the party's candidate for the 2001 by-election, sparked by the successful move from state to federal politics by conservative independent Tony Windsor. Cull faced two strong independent challenges from the sometimes controversial James Treloar, the Mayor of Tamworth who was Windsor's endorsed successor, and Tamworth councillor Warren Woodley. Cull ultimately won the seat by a sizable margin.

He faced a new independent challenge in the general election in 2003 in the form of former Hazelton Airlines executive Peter Draper, who had the strong endorsement of Windsor and popular state independent Richard Torbay. Draper won by more than 1,400 votes, thus ending Cull's short parliamentary career.

New South Wales Legislative Assembly
Preceded by Tony Windsor	Member for Tamworth; 2001–2003	Succeeded by Peter Draper
