= Kevin Anderson =

Kevin Anderson may refer to:

== Arts and entertainment ==
- Kevin Anderson (actor) (born 1960), American actor
- Kevin J. Anderson (born 1962), American science fiction author
- Kevin Anderson (tenor) (fl. 1990s), American opera singer
- Kevin Anderson (cinematographer), Australian cinematographer and filmmaker

== Sports ==
- Kevin Anderson (athletic director) (born 1955), American university sports administrator
- Kevin Anderson (soccer) (born 1971), American soccer midfielder
- Kevin Anderson (boxer) (born 1983), British boxer
- Kevin Anderson (tennis) (born 1986), South African tennis player
- Kevin Anderson (basketball) (born 1988), American basketball player
- Kevin Anderson (American football) (born 1994), American football player

== Others ==
- Kevin Victor Anderson (1912–1999), Australian jurist
- Kevin B. Anderson (born 1948), American sociologist
- Kevin Anderson (scientist) (born 1962), British climate scientist
- Kevin Anderson (Australian politician), Australian politician
- Kevin Anderson (American politician) (born 1967), American politician
