= Raymond Walsh =

Australian politician

Raymond Joseph Walsh (1862 – 10 February 1930) was an Australian politician.

He was born at Ellalong near Maitland, the son of Thomas Walsh and Ellen Brines. He received a primary education and was a compositor on the Maitland Mercury before moving to Tamworth around 1881. There he worked as a tailor, and around 1884 married Mary Elizabeth Buosell, with whom he had three children. In 1901 he was elected to the New South Wales Legislative Assembly as the member for Tamworth; he ran as an independent, but always supported Premier John See and was soon considered a Progressive. In 1903 he was declared bankrupt and thus was no longer eligible to sit in parliament; he contested the by-election as an endorsed Progressive but was defeated by the Liberal candidate. Around 1905 he moved to Toowoomba in Queensland, where he worked as a tailor's cutter. Walsh died at Toowoomba in 1930.

New South Wales Legislative Assembly
Preceded by William Sawers	Member for Tamworth; 1901–1903	Succeeded by John Garland
