= Electoral district of Quirindi =

Former state electoral district of New South Wales, Australia

Quirindi was an electoral district of a Legislative Assembly in the Australian state of New South Wales from 1894 to 1904, named after Quirindi. The district was created when multi-member constituencies were abolished in 1894, and comprised the southern part of Tamworth and the south-eastern part of Gunnedah. The district was abolished in 1904 as a result of the 1903 New South Wales referendum, which reduced the number of members of the Legislative Assembly from 125 to 90, and partly replaced by Liverpool Plains.

== Members for Quirindi ==
Member	Party	Term
Robert Levien	Protectionist	1894–1898
Robert Levien	Independent	1898–1901
Robert Levien	Progressive	1901–1904

== Election results ==
1901 New South Wales state election: Quirindi
Party	Candidate	Votes	%	±%
Progressive	Robert Levien	808	58.5	+4.7
Liberal Reform	John Rodgers	380	27.5	
Labour	Hugh Ross	194	14.0	−30.3
Total formal votes		1,382	99.2	−0.1
Informal votes		11	0.8	+0.1
Turnout		1,393	59.8	−3.0
Member changed to Progressive from Independent				
