= John Garland (Australian politician) =

Politician and barrister in New South Wales, Australia

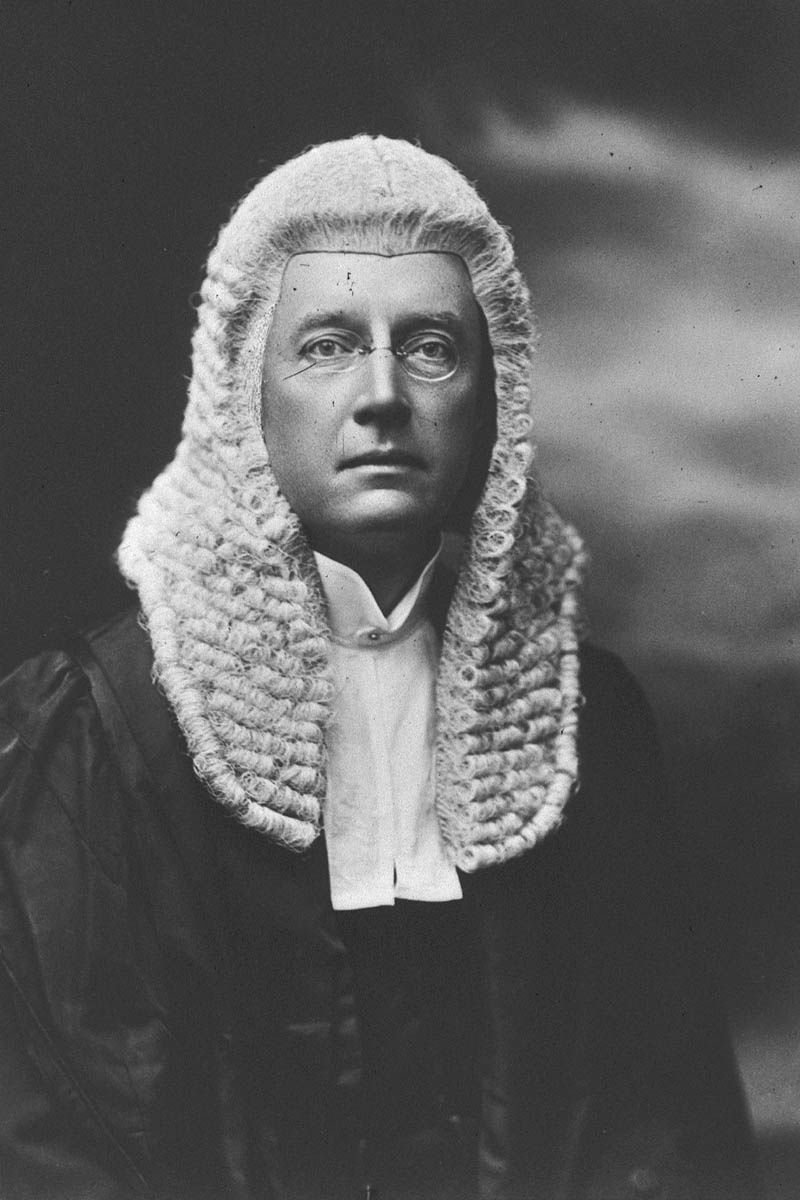

John Garland KC (17 September 1862 – 23 February 1921) was a Scottish-born Australian politician.

He was born at Fordyce, Banffshire (Note: His parliamentary biography lists his place of birth as nearby Cowhythe.) to farmer Robert Garland and Isabella Whyte. He attended Fordyce Academy in Fordyce and graduated as a Master of Arts from the University of Aberdeen in 1882. In 1886, he received a Bachelor of Law degree from the University of Edinburgh, and in 1887 migrated to Australia, where he was called to the bar on 30 November 1888. On 21 December 1896 he married Isobel Chisholm, with whom he had a daughter. A founding member of the Council of the Bar of New South Wales, he was also a procurator of the Presbyterian Church and a lecturer on ecclesiastical law at the University of Sydney.

In 1898 he was elected to the New South Wales Legislative Assembly as the Free Trade member for Woollahra. He was defeated in 1901, but won a by-election for Tamworth in 1903. Defeated again in 1904, he ran unsuccessfully for Phillip in 1907 before he was appointed to the New South Wales Legislative Council in 1908. In 1909 he was appointed Minister of Justice and Solicitor General in the Wade ministry, to assist the Premier in his portfolio of Attorney General, and was appointed King's Counsel on 2 March 1910. He served until October 1910 when Labor assumed office. He was a friend of William Holman, the Labor leader. When Labor split in 1916 he was appointed Minister for Justice and Solicitor General in the second Holman ministry, and was an enthusiastic promoter of the formation of the Nationalist Party. He became Representative of the Government in the Legislative Council in 1918 and Attorney General in 1919.

Garland died at Bellevue Hill on 23 February 1921 (aged 58), survived by his wife Isobel and their daughter, Isabel.

== Notes ==
New South Wales Legislative Assembly
Preceded by Adrian Knox	Member for Woollahra; 1898–1901	Succeeded by William Latimer
Preceded by Raymond Walsh	Member for Tamworth; 1903–1904	Succeeded by Robert Levien
Political offices
Preceded by Charles Wade	Minister of Justice; 1909 – 1910	Succeeded by William Holman
Dormant Title last held by Hugh Pollock	Solicitor General; 1909 – 1910	Succeeded by Walter Bevan
Preceded by David Hall	Minister of Justice; 1916 – 1919	Succeeded by Jack FitzGerald
Preceded by William Holman	Solicitor General; 1916 – 1919	Succeeded by Jack FitzGerald
Preceded by Jack FitzGerald	Representative of the Government in the Legislative Council; 1918 – 1920	Succeeded by Edward Kavanagh
Preceded by David Hall	Attorney-General; 1919 – 1920	Succeeded by Edward McTiernan
