= Harry Levien =

Solicitor and politician in New South Wales, Australia

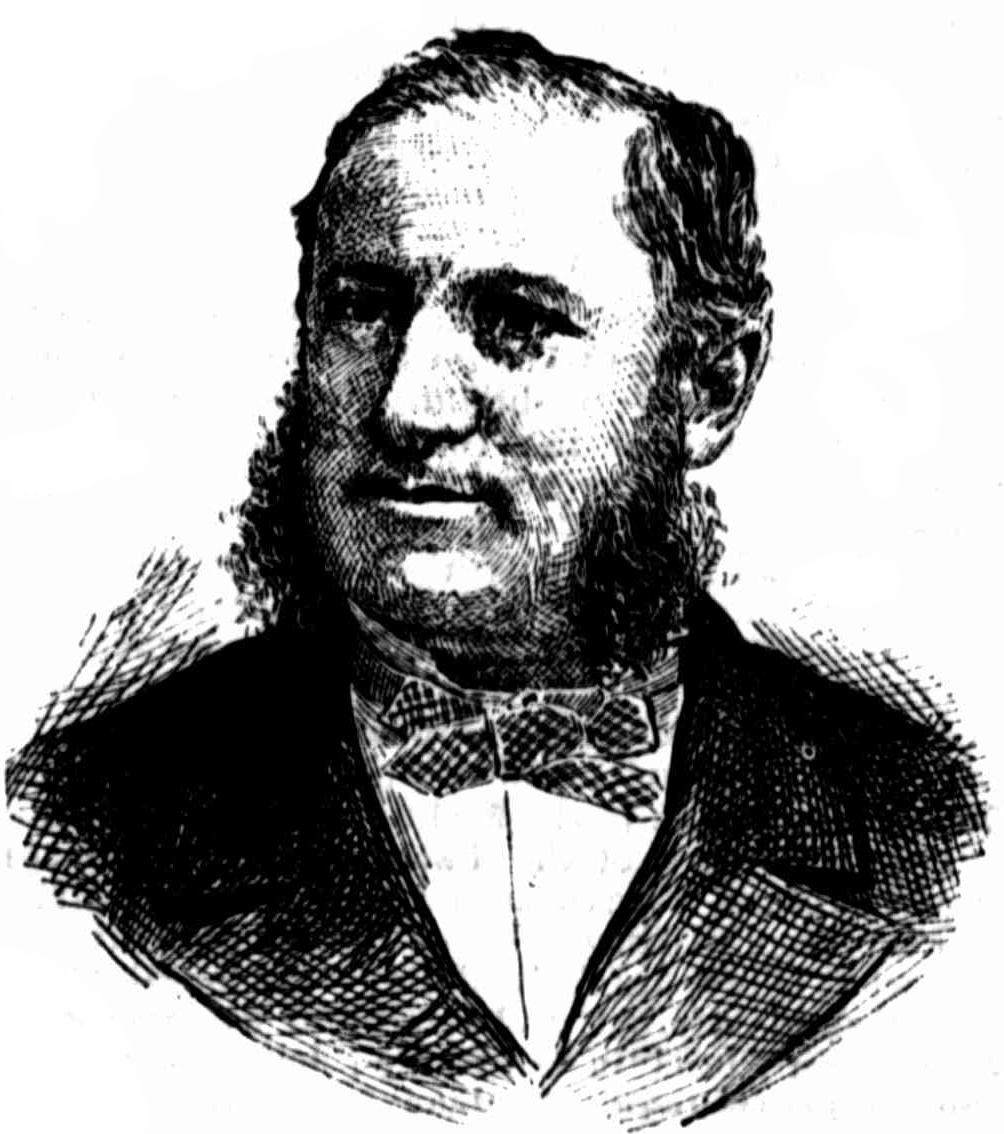
sketch of Levien in 1887

Robert Henry Levien, always known as Harry Levien (17 October 1845 – 12 July 1938) was a solicitor and politician in New South Wales, Australia.

He was born in Singleton to general merchant Alfred Levien and Mayalla MacDerniod. He was educated at West Maitland and became a solicitor's clerk in Newcastle in 1866. He was admitted as a solicitor in 1873, practising at Tenterfield (1873–75), West Maitland (1875–79) and Tamworth (1879–81) before moving to Sydney. On 22 October 1879 he married Harriette Emma Cousins, with whom he had three children.

In 1880 he was elected to the New South Wales Legislative Assembly as the member for Tamworth. A Protectionist, he served as a backbencher for over thirty years (including the period 1894–1904 as member for Quirindi), until he was defeated in 1913. Having become an independent following the collapse of the Progressive Party in 1907, he continued to contest elections as an independent until 1927. He did not hold any ministerial or other parliamentary office.

Levien died in Sydney on 12 July 1938 (aged 92).

New South Wales Legislative Assembly
New district	Member for Tamworth; 1880–1894; With: Burdekin; Gill; Burke; Dowel	Succeeded by George Dibbs
New district	Member for Quirindi; 1894–1904	District abolished
Preceded by John Garland	Member for Tamworth; 1904–1913	Succeeded by Frank Chaffey
