= Peter Draper (politician) =

Australian politician

Peter Ross Draper (born 22 March 1958), a former Australian politician, represented Tamworth as an independent politician between 2003 and 2011.

Draper attended Quirindi High School and lived at Walhollow Aboriginal Mission where his father was principal and manager. He worked for HarperCollins for 16 years, the last eight in Sydney. In about 1982, Draper married and he has two children. The family moved to a small irrigation property near Dungowan in about 1984.

== Notes ==
New South Wales Legislative Assembly
Preceded by John Cull	Member for Tamworth; 2003–2011	Succeeded by Kevin Anderson
