= Tony Windsor =

Australian politician

Tony Windsor AM
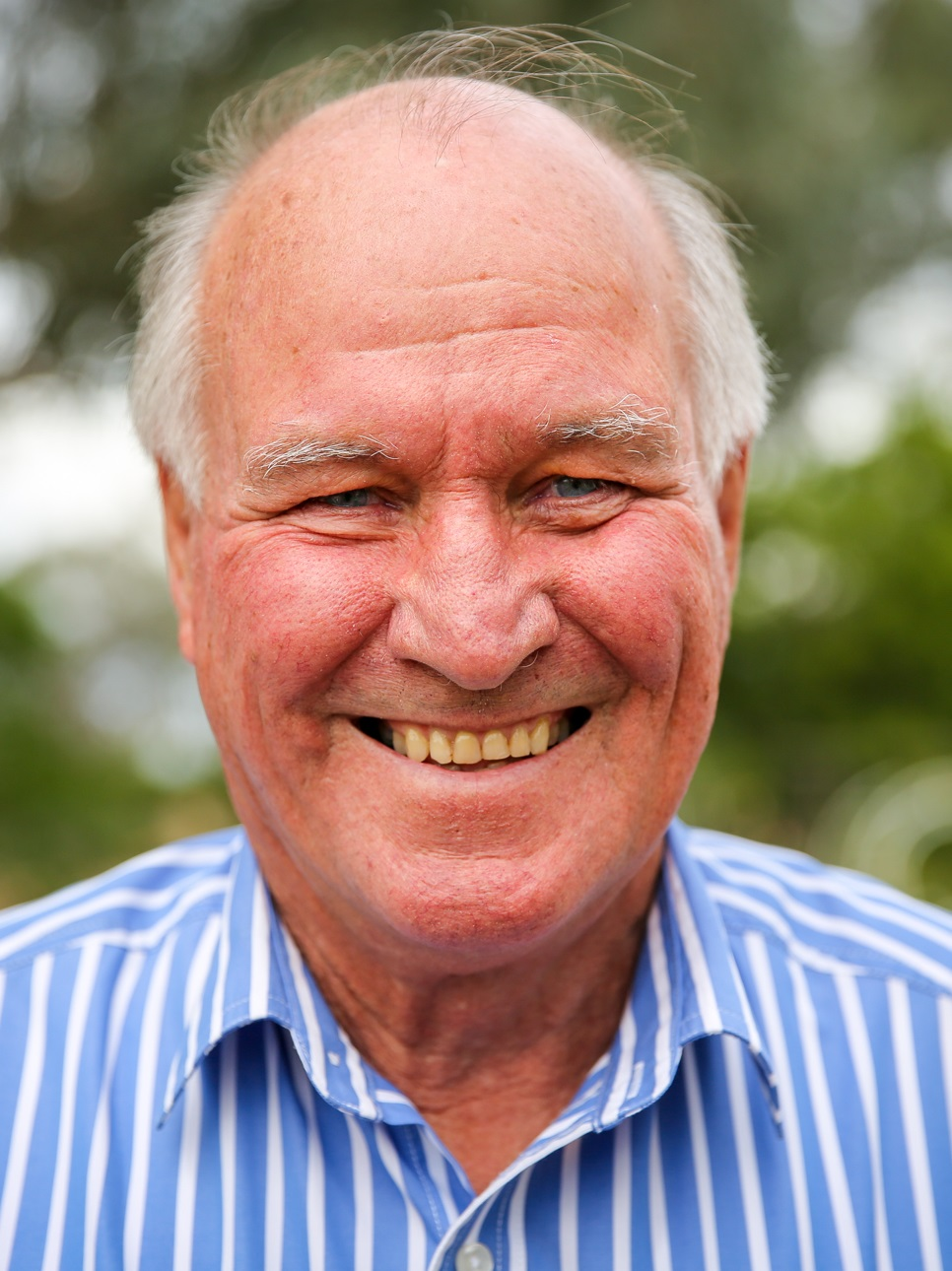

Member of the Australian Parliament for New England
- In office 10 November 2001 – 5 August 2013
- Preceded by: Stuart St. Clair
- Succeeded by: Barnaby Joyce

Member of the New South Wales Parliament for Tamworth
- In office 25 May 1991 – 16 October 2001
- Preceded by: Noel Park
- Succeeded by: John Cull

Personal details
- Born: Antony Harold Curties Windsor; 2 September 1950 (age 76) Quirindi, New South Wales, Australia
- Party: Independent (1991–present)
- Spouse: Lyn
- Children: 1 (female); 2 (male)
- Education: University of New England
- Profession: Economist; Farmer

Antony Harold Curties Windsor, AM (born 2 September 1950) is a former Australian politician. Windsor was an independent member for the New South Wales Legislative Assembly seat of Tamworth from 1991 to 2001 − supporting the incumbent Greiner Liberal/National Coalition minority government at the 1991 election.

He subsequently entered federal politics, serving as an independent member for the Australian House of Representatives seat of New England from 2001 until retiring in 2013 − supporting the incumbent Gillard Labor minority government at the 2010 election.

At the 2016 election, Windsor unsuccessfully attempted to regain the seat of New England against Nationals incumbent Barnaby Joyce.

== Early life ==
Tony Windsor was born in Quirindi, New South Wales. He was one of three sons raised by their mother after their father was killed in a farm accident when Windsor was eight years old. He was educated at Farrer Memorial Agricultural High School, Tamworth and the University of New England, where he graduated with a Bachelor of Economics. He was a farmer at Werris Creek before entering politics.

== New South Wales political career ==
In the 1991 election, Windsor was first elected to the New South Wales Legislative Assembly as the Member for Tamworth. Windsor had originally sought National Party preselection for this seat, but allegations in regards to a drink-driving incident arose on the day of his preselection, and the National Party endorsed another candidate. In spite of the allegations, Windsor won as an independent candidate and held the seat for ten years. Windsor was one of the four independents who held the balance of power after Nick Greiner's Liberal-National Coalition lost 10 seats, resulting in a hung parliament. His decision to support the incumbent Coalition government ensured a second term in government for Greiner. After an adverse ruling by the Independent Commission Against Corruption against Greiner for offering former minister Terry Metherell a patronage job, the Labor opposition tabled a motion of no confidence in the government. Windsor and the other three independents told Greiner that unless he resigned, they would withdraw their support from the government and support the no-confidence motion. Rather than face certain defeat in the House, Greiner resigned and was succeeded by John Fahey.

== Federal political career ==
Windsor resigned from the state parliament in September 2001 in order to contest the federal seat of New England.

In the federal election held later that year, he defeated one-term National incumbent Stuart St. Clair. Windsor took a large lead on the first count, and defeated St. Clair on Labor and other party preferences. Windsor's victory was considered a shock result, since the National Party and its predecessor, the Country Party, had held New England since 1922, usually without serious difficulty.

In September 2004, in an interview with Tony Vermeer from The Sunday Telegraph, Windsor was the centre of controversy over an alleged breach of the Commonwealth Electoral Act. Windsor claimed that he had been approached, in May 2004, by a figure associated with the National Party with the offer of a diplomatic position in exchange for retiring from politics. Windsor made the allegations during the course of the 2004 federal election campaign, some five months after the incident allegedly occurred. The Australian Electoral Commission referred the matter to the Australian Federal Police (AFP). Windsor was comfortably re-elected in the October 2004 election, increasing his majority to 21 percent. A month later, speaking under parliamentary privilege, he said that National Party leader John Anderson and Senator Sandy Macdonald had made the offer through an intermediary, Tamworth businessman Greg McGuire. Windsor also claimed that the AFP had referred the matter to the Commonwealth Director of Public Prosecutions for determination. Anderson, Macdonald, and McGuire denied the claims. The AFP investigated Windsor's claims and advised that the matter would not be prosecuted.

Windsor was comfortably re-elected in 2007, increasing his majority to 24 per cent.

=== 2010 federal election ===
As one of the six crossbenchers elected to the House of Representatives at the 2010 election, Windsor was at the centre of negotiations to determine the government after both major parties failed to win a majority in their own right. Windsor, together with Rob Oakeshott and Bob Katter, initially resolved to form a bloc to assist negotiations with the major parties to form government. However, several days later, Windsor claimed it should not be assumed that the three rural independents would move together. In a press conference on 7 September 2010, Windsor revealed that he would support the incumbent Labor government during confidence motions and supply bills. Oakeshott also threw his support to the incumbent Labor government, handing Labor a second term.

It had been assumed that Windsor would support the Coalition due to his past membership of the National Party but on this Windsor made an analogy of him being an ex-smoker: "I've never been in parliament as a National, I gave up smoking about the same time [and] I've rid myself of two cancers".

Windsor is known as the architect of the bill which became an amendment to the Environment Protection and Biodiversity Conservation Act 1999 (EPBC Act) known as the water trigger. The new legislation forced the government through a process whereby actions by large coal mining developments, in particular coal seam gas, which may adversely affect groundwater in the area and thereby significantly affecting water resources, had to be assessed for environmental impact.

=== 2013 federal election ===
On 26 June 2013 Windsor announced that he would not be contesting the 2013 election; partly due to an undisclosed medical condition.

=== 2016 federal election ===
On 10 March 2016, Windsor announced his intention to contest his former seat of New England as an independent candidate at the 2016 election. Windsor faced incumbent Deputy Prime Minister of Australia and Leader of the National Party of Australia Barnaby Joyce at the 2016 election, who had won the seat upon Windsor's retirement at the previous election. Seat-level polling in the seat of New England found Joyce and Windsor neck and neck. On election day, however, Windsor was convincingly defeated, taking 41 percent of the two-party vote. Joyce was able to win a majority on the primary vote, enough to retain the seat without the need for preferences. Before his defeat at this election Windsor said, "You haven't seen the last of me" and was asked if he would stand again if he did not win he answered, "I wouldn't rule anything out."

== Political views ==
In an interview published in The Sydney Morning Herald following the 2010 federal election, it was reported that Windsor supports a rent resources tax, deep cuts to carbon emissions, and improved services to rural and regional areas such as Labor's proposed National Broadband Network but wants to ensure the scheme is fully costed. The same article claimed that Windsor supports the Coalition's position on water, and the Greens position on a universal dental scheme.

He has fought a long-standing battle protecting the interests of local landholders and farmers living on one of NSW's richest agricultural regions, the Liverpool Plains, due to the impact of mining on underlying groundwater. The region is rich in coal deposits; mining companies, such as BHP and Whitehaven Coal, have sought to acquire land. Greens have campaigned alongside Windsor, against mining companies. During the 2010 federal election campaign, it was revealed that Windsor had sold his family farm at Werris Creek to a wholly owned subsidiary of Whitehaven Coal, and then leased the property back. The reported sale was for more than A$4.5 million. The Australian subsequently claimed that Windsor yielded a return about three times greater than other farmers who sold their properties to the same company in the previous 18 months.

Windsor was present at the February 2011 announcement by the Prime Minister, Julia Gillard, on the proposed July 2012 introduction of a tax on carbon emissions, together with Greens senators Bob Brown and Christine Milne, the Minister for Climate Change, Greg Combet, and independent MP Rob Oakeshott. Windsor downplayed his presence at the announcement, stating, "Please don't construe from my presence here that I will be supporting anything." He was later reported as stating that he would not accept increased transport fuel costs for country people. He subsequently announced that he was supporting Gillard's carbon policy, as a matter of principle, and stated: "This is about the history of people, most of whom haven't even been born yet. And if I'm sacked from politics because of that, well, I'll remove myself with a smile on my face."

Tony Windsor called for a referendum on same-sex marriage back in 2013, saying that the issue should be removed from the hands of politicians.

He also endorsed a referendum on the death penalty in the 1990s.

== After politics ==
Tony Windsor – The Biography was published in 2014.

In October 2021 Windsor was named as an advisor for climate fund, Climate 200.

New South Wales Legislative Assembly
Preceded by Noel Park	Member for Tamworth; 1991–2001	Succeeded by John Cull
Parliament of Australia
Preceded by Stuart St. Clair	Member for New England; 2001–2013	Succeeded by Barnaby Joyce
