= Electoral district of Tamworth =

State electoral district of New South Wales, Australia

Tamworth New South Wales—Legislative Assembly
- Interactive map of district boundaries from the 2023 state election
- State: New South Wales
- Dates current: 1880–1920; 1927–present
- MP: Kevin Anderson
- Party: National Party
- Namesake: Tamworth
- Electors: 60,747 (2023)
- Area: 21,719.78 km^{2} (8,386.1 sq mi)
- Demographic: Provincial and rural
Electorates around Tamworth:
Barwon	Northern Tablelands	Northern Tablelands
Barwon	Tamworth	Northern Tablelands
Barwon	Upper Hunter	Upper Hunter

Tamworth is an electoral district of the Legislative Assembly in the Australian state of New South Wales. It is represented by the Kevin Anderson of the National Party.

Tamworth covers the entirety of Tamworth Regional Council, Gunnedah Shire, Walcha Shire and a small part of Liverpool Plains Shire around Werris Creek.

== History ==
Tamworth was created in 1880 and it elected two members between 1891 and 1894. In 1894, with the abolition of multi-member electorates, new electorates were established such as Quirindi, Bingara and Uralla-Walcha, and Tamworth became a single-member electorate. Proportional representation was introduced in 1920 and Tamworth, along with Gwydir, was absorbed into Namoi. In 1927 single-member electorates were re-established, including Tamworth.

== Members for Tamworth ==
=== First incarnation 1880–1920 ===
Two members (1880–1894)
Member	Party	Term	Member	Party	Term
Robert Levien	None	1880–1887	Sydney Burdekin	None	1880–1882
Robert Levien	None	1880–1887	John Gill	None	1882–1885
Robert Levien	None	1880–1887	Michael Burke	None	1885–1887
Robert Levien	Protectionist	1887–1894	William Dowel	Protectionist	1887–1894

Single-member (1894–1920)
Member	Party	Term
George Dibbs	Protectionist	1894–1895
Albert Piddington	Free Trade	1895–1898
William Sawers	Protectionist	1898–1901
Raymond Walsh	Independent	1901–1903
Raymond Walsh	Progressive	1903–1903
John Garland	Liberal Reform	1903–1904
Robert Levien	Progressive	1904–1907
Robert Levien	Former Progressive	1907–1910
Robert Levien	Independent Liberal	1910–1913
Frank Chaffey	Liberal Reform	1913–1917
Frank Chaffey	Nationalist	1917–1920

=== Second incarnation 1927–present ===
Single-member (1927—present)
Member	Party	Term
Frank Chaffey	Nationalist	1927–1932
Frank Chaffey	United Australia	1932–1940
Bill Chaffey	United Australia	1940–1941
Bill Chaffey	Independent	1941–1947
Bill Chaffey	Country	1947–1972
Bill Chaffey	Independent	1972–1973
Noel Park	National	1973–1991
Tony Windsor	Independent	1991–2001
John Cull	National	2001–2003
Peter Draper	Independent	2003–2011
Kevin Anderson	National	2011–present

== Election results ==
2023 New South Wales state election: Tamworth
Party	Candidate	Votes	%	±%
National	Kevin Anderson	27,333	51.7	−1.8
Independent	Mark Rodda	10,418	19.7	+4.0
Labor	Kate McGrath	6,864	13.0	+3.8
Shooters, Fishers, Farmers	Matthew Scanlan	3,705	7.0	−9.8
Greens	Ryan Brooke	1,786	3.4	+0.6
Legalise Cannabis	Sue Raye	1,554	2.9	+2.9
Informed Medical Options	Rebecca McCredie	887	1.7	+1.7
Sustainable Australia	Colin Drain	328	0.6	+0.5
Total formal votes		52,875	97.5	−0.3
Informal votes		1,374	2.5	+0.3
Turnout		54,249	89.3	−1.4
Notional two-party-preferred count
National	Kevin Anderson	32,433	74.2	−3.8
Labor	Kate McGrath	11,292	25.8	+3.8
Two-candidate-preferred result
National	Kevin Anderson	29,998	65.8	−5.0
Independent	Mark Rodda	15,601	34.2	+5.0
National hold		Swing	−5.0	
