= Electoral results for the district of Vaucluse =

Election results for Vaucluse, New South Wales, Australia

Vaucluse, an electoral district of the Legislative Assembly in the Australian state of New South Wales, has had one incarnation from its creation in 1927 until the present.

== Members for Vaucluse ==
Election	Member	Party
1927	William Foster	Nationalist
1932	William Foster	United Australia
1935	William Foster	United Australia
1936 by	Murray Robson	Ind. United Australia
1938	Murray Robson	United Australia
1941	Murray Robson	United Australia
1944	Murray Robson	Democratic
1947	Murray Robson	Liberal
1950	Murray Robson	Liberal
1953	Murray Robson	Liberal
1956	Murray Robson	Liberal
1957 by	Geoffrey Cox	Liberal
1959	Geoffrey Cox	Liberal
1962	Geoffrey Cox	Liberal
1965	Keith Doyle	Liberal
1968	Keith Doyle	Liberal
1971	Keith Doyle	Liberal
1973	Keith Doyle	Liberal
1976	Keith Doyle	Liberal
1978	Rosemary Foot	Liberal
1981	Rosemary Foot	Liberal
1984	Rosemary Foot	Liberal
1986 by	Ray Aston	Liberal
1988	Ray Aston	Liberal
1988 by	Michael Yabsley	Liberal
1991	Michael Yabsley	Liberal
1994 by	Peter Debnam	Liberal
1995	Peter Debnam	Liberal
1999	Peter Debnam	Liberal
2003	Peter Debnam	Liberal
2007	Peter Debnam	Liberal
2011	Gabrielle Upton	Liberal
2015	Gabrielle Upton	Liberal
2019	Gabrielle Upton	Liberal
2023	Kellie Sloane	Liberal

== Election results ==
=== Elections in the 2020s ===
==== 2023 ====
2023 New South Wales state election: Vaucluse
Party	Candidate	Votes	%	±%
Liberal	Kellie Sloane	24,184	50.1	−6.8
Independent	Karen Freyer	8,236	17.1	+17.1
Labor	Margaret Merten	7,336	15.2	+2.5
Greens	Dominic Wy Kanak	5,632	11.7	−2.1
Liberal Democrats	Gail Stevens	1,166	2.4	+2.4
Sustainable Australia	Kay Dunne	863	1.8	+0.4
Animal Justice	Edward Cameron	846	1.8	+0.4
Total formal votes		48,263	97.9	−0.3
Informal votes		1,055	2.1	+0.3
Turnout		49,318	83.1	−0.7
Notional two-party-preferred count
Liberal	Kellie Sloane	26,574	65.6	−5.0
Labor	Margaret Merten	13,960	34.4	+5.0
Two-candidate-preferred result
Liberal	Kellie Sloane	25,763	62.9	−6.5
Independent	Karen Freyer	15,206	37.1	+37.1
Liberal hold				

=== Elections in the 2010s ===
==== 2019 ====
2019 New South Wales state election: Vaucluse
Party	Candidate	Votes	%	±%
Liberal	Gabrielle Upton	26,397	57.36	−8.21
Greens	Megan McEwin	6,494	14.11	−4.44
Labor	Lenore Kulakauskas	5,881	12.78	−0.42
Keep Sydney Open	Mark Macsmith	3,683	8.00	+8.00
Independent	Miriam Guttman-Jones	2,284	4.96	+4.96
Animal Justice	Deb Doyle	664	1.44	+1.44
Sustainable Australia	Kay Dunne	620	1.35	+1.35
Total formal votes		46,023	98.17	+0.62
Informal votes		856	1.83	−0.62
Turnout		46,879	83.05	−2.12
Two-party-preferred result
Liberal	Gabrielle Upton	28,616	70.58	−4.72
Labor	Lenore Kulakauskas	11,927	29.42	+4.72
Two-candidate-preferred result
Liberal	Gabrielle Upton	28,260	69.32	−3.61
Greens	Megan McEwin	12,506	30.68	+3.61
Liberal hold		Swing	−3.61	

==== 2015 ====
2015 New South Wales state election: Vaucluse
Party	Candidate	Votes	%	±%
Liberal	Gabrielle Upton	30,257	65.6	−4.2
Greens	Megan McEwin	8,559	18.5	+0.3
Labor	Gloria Nicol	6,090	13.2	+2.5
No Land Tax	Susanne Gervay	854	1.9	+1.9
Christian Democrats	Beresford Thomas	387	0.8	−0.4
Total formal votes		46,147	97.6	+0.8
Informal votes		1,155	2.4	−0.8
Turnout		47,302	85.2	−0.2
Notional two-party-preferred count
Liberal	Gabrielle Upton	31,493	75.3	−6.1
Labor	Gloria Nicol	10,331	24.7	+6.1
Two-candidate-preferred result
Liberal	Gabrielle Upton	31,118	72.9	−3.2
Greens	Megan McEwin	11,551	27.1	+3.2
Liberal hold		Swing	−3.2	

==== 2011 ====
2011 New South Wales state election: Vaucluse
Party	Candidate	Votes	%	±%
Liberal	Gabrielle Upton	30,187	69.8	+9.9
Greens	Susan Jarnason	7,879	18.2	−2.2
Labor	Pauline Neill	4,645	10.7	−8.9
Christian Democrats	Beresford Thomas	549	1.3	+1.3
Total formal votes		43,260	97.4	+0.2
Informal votes		1,134	2.6	−0.2
Turnout		44,394	87.8	
Notional two-party-preferred count
Liberal	Gabrielle Upton	31,564	81.4	+13.5
Labor	Pauline Neill	7,215	18.6	–13.5
Two-candidate-preferred result
Liberal	Gabrielle Upton	30,895	76.1	+10.0
Greens	Susan Jarnason	9,714	23.9	−10.0
Liberal hold		Swing	+10.0	

=== Elections in the 2000s ===
==== 2007 ====
2007 New South Wales state election: Vaucluse
Party	Candidate	Votes	%	±%
Liberal	Peter Debnam	24,377	59.9	+6.1
Greens	David Shoebridge	8,319	20.4	+3.7
Labor	Alison Rahill	7,992	19.6	−5.8
Total formal votes		40,688	97.2	−0.6
Informal votes		1,170	2.8	+0.6
Turnout		41,858	88.7	
Notional two-party-preferred count
Liberal	Peter Debnam	25,445	67.9	+7.0
Labor	Alison Rahill	12,055	32.1	–7.0
Two-candidate-preferred result
Liberal	Peter Debnam	24,986	66.1	+5.2
Greens	David Shoebridge	12,842	33.9	+33.9
Liberal hold		Swing	+5.2	

==== 2003 ====
2003 New South Wales state election: Vaucluse
Party	Candidate	Votes	%	±%
Liberal	Peter Debnam	19,735	54.4	+0.6
Labor	Alice Salomon	9,667	26.6	−0.6
Greens	Rory O'Gorman	6,463	17.8	+7.7
Unity	Teck Yong	441	1.2	+1.2
Total formal votes		36,306	97.8	+0.0
Informal votes		826	2.2	−0.0
Turnout		37,132	85.6	
Two-party-preferred result
Liberal	Peter Debnam	20,333	60.3	−2.2
Labor	Alice Salomon	13,407	39.7	+2.2
Liberal hold		Swing	−2.2	

=== Elections in the 1990s ===
==== 1999 ====
1999 New South Wales state election: Vaucluse
Party	Candidate	Votes	%	±%
Liberal	Peter Debnam	20,271	53.8	−6.9
Labor	David Patch	10,244	27.2	+4.6
Greens	Haete Weiner	3,797	10.1	+1.0
Democrats	Margaret Collings	2,269	6.0	+2.8
One Nation	Waverney Ford	791	2.1	+2.1
Euthanasia Referendum	Gregor Zylber	305	0.8	+0.8
Total formal votes		37,677	97.8	+1.6
Informal votes		860	2.2	−1.6
Turnout		38,537	88.3	
Two-party-preferred result
Liberal	Peter Debnam	21,486	62.5	−5.0
Labor	David Patch	12,903	37.5	+5.0
Liberal hold		Swing	−5.0	

==== 1995 ====
1995 New South Wales state election: Vaucluse
Party	Candidate	Votes	%	±%
Liberal	Peter Debnam	19,576	59.2	+4.1
Labor	Barbara Armitage	8,695	26.3	+8.9
Greens	Tom McLoughlin	3,331	10.1	+5.1
Democrats	Mary de Merindol	1,277	3.9	+0.4
Natural Law	Patricia Boland	212	0.6	+0.6
Total formal votes		33,091	95.8	+5.1
Informal votes		1,449	4.2	−5.1
Turnout		34,540	89.3	
Two-party-preferred result
Liberal	Peter Debnam	20,540	65.4	+2.4
Labor	Barbara Armitage	10,862	34.6	+34.6
Liberal hold		Swing	+2.4	

==== 1994 by-election ====
1994 Vaucluse by-election Saturday 9 April
Party	Candidate	Votes	%	±%
Liberal	Peter Debnam	15,757	58.5	+3.4
Labor	Barbara Armitage	7,856	29.2	+11.8
Greens	Murray Matson	2,453	9.1	
Independent	Rodney Marks	870	3.2	
Total formal votes		26,936	97.1	+6.4
Informal votes		808	2.9	−6.4
Turnout		27,744	70.7	−19.4
Two-party-preferred result
Liberal	Peter Debnam	16,621	63.3	+0.3
Labor	Barbara Armitage	9,645	36.7	
Liberal hold		Swing		

Michael Yabsley (Liberal) resigned.

==== 1991 ====
1991 New South Wales state election: Vaucluse
Party	Candidate	Votes	%	±%
Liberal	Michael Yabsley	16,876	55.1	−9.4
Labor	James Dupree	5,337	17.4	−14.8
Independent	Rose Watson	4,444	14.5	+14.5
Greens	Geoff Ash	1,509	4.9	+4.9
Democrats	Victoria Resch	1,050	3.4	+0.1
Independent	Yvonne Jayawardena	1,022	3.3	+3.3
Independent	Tony Waldron	412	1.3	+1.3
Total formal votes		30,650	90.7	−5.7
Informal votes		3,128	9.3	+5.7
Turnout		33,778	90.2	
Two-candidate-preferred result
Liberal	Michael Yabsley	17,862	63.0	−3.2
Independent	Rose Watson	10,475	37.0	+37.0
Liberal hold		Swing	−3.2	

=== Elections in the 1980s ===
==== 1988 by-election ====
1988 Vaucluse by-election Monday 6 June
Party	Candidate	Votes	%	±%
Liberal	Michael Yabsley	Unopposed		
Liberal hold				

Ray Aston (Liberal) died.

==== 1988 ====
1988 New South Wales state election: Vaucluse
Party	Candidate	Votes	%	±%
Liberal	Ray Aston	20,267	77.2	+4.4
Labor	Beverley Crane	5,982	22.8	−0.4
Total formal votes		26,249	96.4	−0.6
Informal votes		993	3.6	+0.6
Turnout		27,242	89.9	
Liberal hold		Swing	+2.3	

==== 1986 by-election ====
1986 Vaucluse by-election Saturday 31 May
Party	Candidate	Votes	%	±%
Liberal	Ray Aston	13,245	72.6	+0.2
Democrats	Yvonne Jayawardena	1,978	10.8	+6.8
Call to Australia	Elaine Nile	1,173	6.4	
Nuclear Free Australia	Gillian Fisher	931	5.1	
Nuclear Disarmament	Robert Wood	732	4.0	
Uninflated Movement	Nadar Ponnuswamy	99	0.5	
Small Business and Enterprise Party	Stanley Fitzroy-Mendis	81	0.44	+0.4
Total formal votes		18,239	96.3	−0.8
Informal votes		711	3.8	+0.8
Turnout		18,950	61.1 (Note: Estimate based on a roll of 30,993 at the 1984 election.)	−27.6
Liberal hold		Swing		

Liberal member Rosemary Foot resigned.

==== 1984 ====
1984 New South Wales state election: Vaucluse
Party	Candidate	Votes	%	±%
Liberal	Rosemary Foot	19,331	72.4	+7.8
Labor	David Curtis	6,271	23.5	−1.5
Democrats	Joseph Zingarelli	1,080	4.1	−0.2
Total formal votes		26,682	97.0	+0.8
Informal votes		823	3.0	−0.8
Turnout		27,505	88.8	+2.5
Two-party-preferred result
Liberal	Rosemary Foot		74.6	+4.5
Labor	David Curtis		25.4	−4.5
Liberal hold		Swing	+4.5	

==== 1981 ====
1981 New South Wales state election: Vaucluse
Party	Candidate	Votes	%	±%
Liberal	Rosemary Foot	16,840	64.6	
Labor	Nance Loney	6,529	25.0	
Independent	Mark Ure	1,602	6.1	
Democrats	Brian Hillman	1,112	4.3	
Total formal votes		26,083	96.2	
Informal votes		1,018	3.8	
Turnout		27,101	86.3	
Two-party-preferred result
Liberal	Rosemary Foot	17,600	70.1	+7.9
Labor	Nance Loney	7,500	29.9	−7.9
Liberal hold		Swing	+7.9	

=== Elections in the 1970s ===
==== 1978 ====
1978 New South Wales state election: Vaucluse
Party	Candidate	Votes	%	±%
Liberal	Rosemary Foot	12,643	49.4	−14.2
Labor	Barbara Fuller-Quinn	10,977	42.9	+6.5
Democrats	Norman Majer	1,984	7.7	+7.7
Total formal votes		25,604	96.7	−0.4
Informal votes		882	3.3	+0.4
Turnout		26,486	88.6	−0.4
Two-party-preferred result
Liberal	Rosemary Foot	13,965	54.5	−9.1
Labor	Barbara Fuller-Quinn	11,639	45.5	+9.1
Liberal hold		Swing	−9.1	

==== 1976 ====
1976 New South Wales state election: Vaucluse
Party	Candidate	Votes	%	±%
Liberal	Keith Doyle	17,492	63.6	+0.5
Labor	Barbara Fuller-Quinn	9,994	36.4	+36.4
Total formal votes		27,486	97.1	+2.6
Informal votes		816	2.9	−2.6
Turnout		28,302	89.0	+1.0
Liberal hold		Swing	−5.2	

==== 1973 ====
1973 New South Wales state election: Vaucluse
Party	Candidate	Votes	%	±%
Liberal	Keith Doyle	15,906	63.1	−1.1
Australia	Brian Hickey	6,403	25.4	+25.4
Democratic Labor	Doris Anderson	2,901	11.5	+11.5
Total formal votes		25,210	94.5	
Informal votes		1,463	5.5	
Turnout		26,673	88.0	
Two-candidate-preferred result
Liberal	Keith Doyle	17,357	68.8	+0.3
Australia	Brian Hickey	7,853	31.2	+31.2
Liberal hold		Swing	+0.3	

==== 1971 ====
1971 New South Wales state election: Vaucluse
Party	Candidate	Votes	%	±%
Liberal	Keith Doyle	16,099	64.2	−7.1
Independent	Lincoln Oppenheimer	6,794	27.1	+27.1
Independent	Harry Marsh	2,190	8.7	+8.7
Total formal votes		25,083	94.6	
Informal votes		1,433	5.4	
Turnout		26,516	90.2	
Two-candidate-preferred result
Liberal	Keith Doyle	17,194	68.5	−8.5
Independent	Lincoln Oppenheimer	7,889	31.5	+31.5
Liberal hold		Swing	−8.5	

=== Elections in the 1960s ===
==== 1968 ====
1968 New South Wales state election: Vaucluse
Party	Candidate	Votes	%	±%
Liberal	Keith Doyle	16,079	71.3	−3.7
Labor	William Ross	4,875	21.6	+21.6
Democratic Labor	Hugh Bartlett	1,611	7.1	−4.9
Total formal votes		22,565	96.4	
Informal votes		842	3.6	
Turnout		23,407	91.2	
Two-party-preferred result
Liberal	Keith Doyle	17,368	77.0	−4.0
Labor	William Ross	5,197	23.0	+23.0
Liberal hold		Swing	−4.0	

==== 1965 ====
1965 New South Wales state election: Vaucluse
Party	Candidate	Votes	%	±%
Liberal	Keith Doyle	17,319	75.0	−4.0
Independent	Kevin McDermott	2,996	13.0	+13.0
Democratic Labor	Edward Byrnes	2,781	12.0	−9.0
Total formal votes		23,096	95.0	+1.7
Informal votes		1,221	5.0	−1.7
Turnout		24,317	90.6	+0.5
Two-candidate-preferred result
Liberal	Keith Doyle	18,709	81.0	+9.7
Independent	Kevin McDermott	4,387	19.0	−9.7
Liberal hold		Swing	N/A	

==== 1962 ====
1962 New South Wales state election: Vaucluse
Party	Candidate	Votes	%	±%
Liberal	Geoffrey Cox	17,840	79.0	−21.0
Democratic Labor	Valerie Olsen	4,754	21.0	+21.0
Total formal votes		22,594	93.3	
Informal votes		1,625	6.7	
Turnout		24,219	90.1	
Liberal hold		Swing	N/A	

=== Elections in the 1950s ===
==== 1959 ====
1959 New South Wales state election: Vaucluse
Party	Candidate	Votes	%	±%
Liberal	Geoffrey Cox	unopposed		
Liberal hold				

==== 1957 by-election ====
1957 Vaucluse by-election Saturday 24 August
Party	Candidate	Votes	%	±%
Liberal	Geoffrey Cox	7,716	44.94	−26.47
Independent Liberal	Hugh Foster	3,802	22.14	
Independent Liberal	Norman Mills	2,616	15.24	
Independent	Alfred Elboz	2,354	13.71	
Independent	Edward Spensley	681	3.97	
Total formal votes		17,169	74.81	
Informal votes		792	4.41	
Turnout		17,961	79.22	
Two-candidate-preferred result
Liberal	Geoffrey Cox	8,854	51.57	
Independent Liberal	Hugh Foster	8,315	48.43	
Liberal hold		Swing	N/A	

Murray Robson (Liberal) resigned.

==== 1956 ====
1956 New South Wales state election: Vaucluse
Party	Candidate	Votes	%	±%
Liberal	Murray Robson	14,865	71.4	−28.6
Independent	Alfred Elboz	5,950	28.6	+28.6
Total formal votes		20,815	97.3	
Informal votes		575	2.7	
Turnout		21,390	90.3	
Liberal hold		Swing	N/A	

==== 1953 ====
1953 New South Wales state election: Vaucluse
Party	Candidate	Votes	%	±%
Liberal	Murray Robson	unopposed		
Liberal hold				

==== 1950 ====
1950 New South Wales state election: Vaucluse
Party	Candidate	Votes	%	±%
Liberal	Murray Robson	12,658	68.4	
Labor	Harold Levien	5,097	27.5	
Independent Liberal	Tasman Crocker	759	4.1	
Total formal votes		18,514	98.6	
Informal votes		257	1.4	
Turnout		18,771	91.4	
Two-party-preferred result
Liberal	Murray Robson		72.0 (Note: Two party preferred vote was estimated.)	
Labor	Harold Levien		28.0	
Liberal hold		Swing		

=== Elections in the 1940s ===
==== 1947 ====
1947 New South Wales state election: Vaucluse
Party	Candidate	Votes	%	±%
Liberal	Murray Robson	16,097	67.4	−32.6
Independent Liberal	Frank Browne	7,789	32.6	+32.6
Total formal votes		23,886	95.4	
Informal votes		1,161	4.6	
Turnout		25,047	93.0	
Liberal hold		Swing	N/A	

==== 1944 ====
1944 New South Wales state election: Vaucluse
Party	Candidate	Votes	%	±%
Democratic	Murray Robson	unopposed		
Democratic hold				

==== 1941 ====
1941 New South Wales state election: Vaucluse
Party	Candidate	Votes	%	±%
United Australia	Murray Robson	unopposed		
United Australia hold				

=== Elections in the 1930s ===
==== 1938 ====
This section is an excerpt from 1938 New South Wales state election § Vaucluse

1938 New South Wales state election: Vaucluse
Party	Candidate	Votes	%	±%
United Australia	Murray Robson	unopposed		
United Australia hold				

William Foster (United Australia) died and Murray Robson had been elected as an Independent candidate at the resulting by-election however he re-joined the United Australia party.

==== 1936 by-election ====
1936 Vaucluse by-election Saturday 29 August
Party	Candidate	Votes	%	±%
Ind. United Australia	Murray Robson	10,563	62.6	
United Australia	Hugh Foster	6,304	37.4	
Total formal votes		16,867	97.3	
Informal votes		470	2.7	
Turnout		17,337	82.92	
Ind. United Australia gain from United Australia		Swing		

William Foster (United Australia) died.

==== 1935 ====
This section is an excerpt from 1935 New South Wales state election § Vaucluse

1935 New South Wales state election: Vaucluse
Party	Candidate	Votes	%	±%
United Australia	William Foster	unopposed		
United Australia hold				

==== 1932 ====
This section is an excerpt from 1932 New South Wales state election § Vaucluse

1932 New South Wales state election: Vaucluse
Party	Candidate	Votes	%	±%
United Australia	William Foster	unopposed		
United Australia hold				

==== 1930 ====
This section is an excerpt from 1930 New South Wales state election § Vaucluse

1930 New South Wales state election: Vaucluse
Party	Candidate	Votes	%	±%
Nationalist	William Foster	12,107	70.3	
Labor	Thomas Foster	3,341	19.4	
Australian	John Garvan	1,780	10.3	
Total formal votes		17,228	98.3	
Informal votes		290	1.7	
Turnout		17,518	92.2	
Nationalist hold		Swing		

=== Elections in the 1920s ===
==== 1927 ====
This section is an excerpt from 1927 New South Wales state election § Vaucluse

1927 New South Wales state election: Vaucluse
Party	Candidate	Votes	%	±%
Nationalist	William Foster	11,287	84.1	
Labor	Henrietta Greville	2,128	15.9	
Total formal votes		13,415	99.3	
Informal votes		88	0.7	
Turnout		13,503	77.6	
Nationalist win		(new seat)		
