= Results of the 1984 New South Wales Legislative Assembly election =

State election for New South Wales, Australia in March 1984

New South Wales state election, 24 March 1984 Legislative Assembly << 1981–1988 >>
Enrolled voters	3,330,350				
Votes cast	3,081,226		Turnout	92.52	+1.37
Informal votes	74,316		Informal	2.41	–0.67
Summary of votes by party
Party	Primary votes	%	Swing	Seats	Change
Labor	1,466,413	48.77	–6.95	58	– 11
Liberal	1,026,901	34.15	+6.53	22	+ 8
National	266,095	8.85	–2.37	15	+ 1
Democrats	85,604	2.85	+0.42	0	± 0
Ind. Country	25,227	0.84	+0.84	1	+ 1
Call to Australia	2,347	0.08	+0.08	0	± 0
Socialist Labour	2,113	0.07	+0.07	0	± 0
Independent	130,013	4.32	+1.53	3	+ 1
Other (Note: One candidate each from the Citizens Action, Rainbow, Uninflated and National Action Parties.)	2,197	0.07	+0.07	0	± 0
Total	3,006,910			99	
Two-party-preferred
Labor		52.4%	-6.3%		
Liberal/National		47.6%	+6.3%		

This is a list of electoral district results for the 1984 New South Wales state election.

== Results by electoral district ==
=== Albury ===
1984 New South Wales state election: Albury
Party	Candidate	Votes	%	±%
Labor	Harold Mair	15,788	50.8	−4.5
Liberal	Ian Glachan	14,617	47.1	+2.4
Democrats	Christopher Rooke	665	2.1	+2.1
Total formal votes		31,070	98.8	+0.4
Informal votes		366	1.2	−0.4
Turnout		31,436	92.0	+1.9
Two-party-preferred result
Labor	Harold Mair		51.9	−3.4
Liberal	Ian Glachan		48.1	+3.4
Labor hold		Swing	−3.4	

=== Ashfield ===
1984 New South Wales state election: Ashfield
Party	Candidate	Votes	%	±%
Labor	Paul Whelan	16,290	59.9	−5.6
Liberal	Geoffrey Howe	10,891	40.1	+9.8
Total formal votes		27,181	95.7	+0.5
Informal votes		1,232	4.3	−0.5
Turnout		28,413	90.4	+2.3
Labor hold		Swing	−8.3	

=== Auburn ===
1984 New South Wales state election: Auburn
Party	Candidate	Votes	%	±%
Labor	Peter Cox	17,831	66.8	−3.5
Liberal	Rudolph Ognibene	8,856	33.2	+3.5
Total formal votes		26,687	95.9	+0.5
Informal votes		1,142	4.1	−0.5
Turnout		27,829	92.7	+1.3
Labor hold		Swing	−3.5	

=== Balmain ===
1984 New South Wales state election: Balmain
Party	Candidate	Votes	%	±%
Labor	Peter Crawford	15,158	60.7	+1.5
Liberal	Gibson Bennie	6,003	24.0	+9.4
Socialist Labour	Noel Hazard	2,061	8.3	+5.5
Democrats	Karen McEwan	1,763	7.1	+0.1
Total formal votes		24,985	96.1	+0.7
Informal votes		1,025	3.9	−0.7
Turnout		26,010	89.0	+2.7
Two-party-preferred result
Labor	Peter Crawford		69.0	−12.0
Liberal	Gibson Bennie		31.0	+12.0
Labor hold		Swing	−12.0	

=== Bankstown ===
1984 New South Wales state election: Bankstown
Party	Candidate	Votes	%	±%
Labor	Ric Mochalski	19,403	64.5	−0.4
Liberal	Terry McDonald	10,668	35.5	+5.6
Total formal votes		30,071	96.0	+0.2
Informal votes		1,258	4.0	−0.2
Turnout		31,329	93.8	+1.0
Labor hold		Swing	−4.2	

=== Barwon ===
1984 New South Wales state election: Barwon
Party	Candidate	Votes	%	±%
National	Wal Murray	18,503	58.5	−4.7
Labor	Bill Sinclair	10,368	32.8	−4.0
Independent	Andrew Von Mengersen	2,729	8.6	+8.6
Total formal votes		31,600	98.8	+0.7
Informal votes		389	1.2	−0.7
Turnout		31,989	91.7	+1.2
Two-party-preferred result
National	Wal Murray		63.0	−0.2
Labor	Bill Sinclair		37.0	+0.2
National hold		Swing	−0.2	

=== Bass Hill ===
1984 New South Wales state election: Bass Hill
Party	Candidate	Votes	%	±%
Labor	Neville Wran	19,432	64.1	−11.6
Liberal	Peter Swiderski	8,897	29.4	+5.1
Citizens Action	Sandor Torzsok	1,330	4.4	+4.4
Rainbow Party	Julien Droulers	642	2.1	+2.1
Total formal votes		30,301	96.1	−0.5
Informal votes		1,237	3.9	+0.5
Turnout		31,538	94.7	+1.1
Two-party-preferred result
Labor	Neville Wran		67.3	−8.4
Liberal	Peter Swiderski		32.7	+8.4
Labor hold		Swing	−8.4	

=== Bathurst ===
1984 New South Wales state election: Bathurst
Party	Candidate	Votes	%	±%
Labor	Mick Clough	17,400	52.9	+2.8
National	Clive Osborne	10,364	31.5	−18.4
National	Trevor Toole	4,298	13.1	+13.1
Democrats	Louis Winters	848	2.6	+2.6
Total formal votes		32,910	98.8	+0.8
Informal votes		392	1.2	−0.8
Turnout		33,302	94.6	+0.9
Two-party-preferred result
Labor	Mick Clough		55.3	+5.2
National	Clive Osborne		44.7	−5.2
Labor hold		Swing	+5.2	

=== Blacktown ===
1984 New South Wales state election: Blacktown
Party	Candidate	Votes	%	±%
Labor	John Aquilina	20,605	66.6	−6.5
Liberal	David Bannerman	10,319	33.4	+6.5
Total formal votes		30,924	96.6	+0.7
Informal votes		1,094	3.4	−0.7
Turnout		32,018	92.6	+0.2
Labor hold		Swing	−6.5	

=== Bligh ===
1984 New South Wales state election: Bligh
Party	Candidate	Votes	%	±%
Liberal	Michael Yabsley	13,134	48.5	+4.2
Labor	Fred Miller	12,279	45.3	−2.3
Democrats	Brian Hillman	1,689	6.2	+2.0
Total formal votes		27,102	96.4	+0.2
Informal votes		1,005	3.6	−0.2
Turnout		28,107	85.8	+3.0
Two-party-preferred result
Liberal	Michael Yabsley	13,740	51.2	+3.9
Labor	Fred Miller	13,085	48.8	−3.9
Liberal gain from Labor		Swing	+3.9	

=== Blue Mountains ===
1984 New South Wales state election: Blue Mountains
Party	Candidate	Votes	%	±%
Labor	Bob Debus	16,830	48.5	−9.9
Liberal	Margaret Bradshaw	12,962	37.3	−2.2
Democrats	Steve Franklin	2,600	7.5	+7.5
Call to Australia	Bruce Fry	2,347	6.8	+6.8
Total formal votes		34,739	98.4	+0.8
Informal votes		579	1.6	−0.8
Turnout		35,318	92.3	+0.9
Two-party-preferred result
Labor	Bob Debus	18,186	53.5	−6.1
Liberal	Margaret Bradshaw	15,832	46.5	+6.1
Labor hold		Swing	−6.1	

=== Broken Hill ===
1984 New South Wales state election: Broken Hill
Party	Candidate	Votes	%	±%
Labor	Bill Beckroge	17,440	68.7	−0.3
Liberal	Geoffrey Anderson	4,019	15.8	+15.8
National	Neville Crisp	3,913	15.4	−15.6
Total formal votes		25,372	97.8	+0.9
Informal votes		577	2.2	−0.9
Turnout		25,949	89.7	+0.9
Two-party-preferred result
Labor	Bill Beckroge		70.1	+1.1
Liberal	Geoffrey Anderson		29.9	+29.9
Labor hold		Swing	+1.1	

=== Burrinjuck ===
1984 New South Wales state election: Burrinjuck
Party	Candidate	Votes	%	±%
Labor	Terry Sheahan	17,377	52.8	−2.8
National	John Sharp	14,643	44.5	+3.1
Democrats	Joyce Copeland	885	2.7	−0.3
Total formal votes		32,905	99.0	+0.3
Informal votes		323	1.0	−0.3
Turnout		33,228	94.0	−0.4
Two-party-preferred result
Labor	Terence Sheahan		54.3	−2.9
National	John Sharp		45.7	+2.9
Labor hold		Swing	−2.9	

=== Burwood ===
1984 New South Wales state election: Burwood
Party	Candidate	Votes	%	±%
Liberal	Paul Zammit	14,377	49.9	+8.1
Labor	Phil O'Neill	13,556	47.1	−8.1
Democrats	Stephen Kirkham	857	3.0	−0.1
Total formal votes		28,790	97.4	+0.9
Informal votes		775	2.6	−0.9
Turnout		29,565	92.8	+2.5
Two-party-preferred result
Liberal	Paul Zammit	14,802	51.6	+8.8
Labor	Phil O'Neill	13,869	48.4	−8.8
Liberal gain from Labor		Swing	+8.8	

=== Byron ===
1984 New South Wales state election: Byron
Party	Candidate	Votes	%	±%
National	Don Beck	15,860	45.4	−6.8
Labor	Lyle Robb	14,586	41.8	−2.1
Independent	Alan Mountain	1,704	4.9	+4.9
Democrats	Kenneth Nicholson	1,631	4.7	+0.8
Independent	James Mangleson	1,133	3.2	+3.2
Total formal votes		34,914	98.1	+0.7
Informal votes		658	1.9	−0.7
Turnout		35,572	89.5	−0.7
Two-party-preferred result
National	Don Beck	17,431	50.8	−3.5
Labor	Lyle Robb	16,850	49.2	+3.5
National hold		Swing	−3.5	

=== Cabramatta ===
1984 New South Wales state election: Cabramatta
Party	Candidate	Votes	%	±%
Labor	Eric Bedford	19,159	65.1	−8.9
Liberal	Maria Heggie	10,289	34.9	+8.9
Total formal votes		29,448	95.8	+0.8
Informal votes		1,286	4.2	−0.8
Turnout		30,734	91.8	+1.9
Labor hold		Swing	−8.9	

=== Camden ===
1984 New South Wales state election: Camden
Party	Candidate	Votes	%	±%
Liberal	John Fahey	18,656	55.2	+9.5
Labor	Ralph Brading	15,112	44.8	−2.6
Total formal votes		33,768	97.9	+0.7
Informal votes		737	2.1	−0.7
Turnout		34,505	93.3	+1.0
Liberal gain from Labor		Swing	+7.2	

=== Campbelltown ===
1984 New South Wales state election: Campbelltown
Party	Candidate	Votes	%	±%
Labor	Michael Knight	19,781	53.0	+0.3
Independent	Gordon Fetterplace	8,518	22.8	−17.9
Liberal	Violette Samaha	7,138	19.1	+19.1
Independent	Edward Houston	1,856	5.0	+5.0
Total formal votes		37,293	97.5	−0.1
Informal votes		969	2.5	+0.1
Turnout		38,262	93.0	+1.4
Two-candidate-preferred result
Labor	Michael Knight		58.7	
Independent	Gordon Fetterplace		41.3	
Labor hold		Swing		

=== Canterbury ===
1984 New South Wales state election: Canterbury
Party	Candidate	Votes	%	±%
Labor	Kevin Stewart	19,253	67.9	−10.7
Liberal	Robert Sharp	9,087	32.1	+10.7
Total formal votes		28,340	95.9	+0.9
Informal votes		1,214	4.1	−0.9
Turnout		29,554	92.1	+1.7
Labor hold		Swing	−10.7	

=== Castlereagh ===
1984 New South Wales state election: Castlereagh
Party	Candidate	Votes	%	±%
National	Roger Wotton	17,931	56.0	+2.6
Labor	Jim Curran	13,158	41.1	−5.5
Democrats	Anne Graham	900	2.8	+2.8
Total formal votes		31,989	99.0	+0.5
Informal votes		325	1.0	−0.5
Turnout		32,314	93.3	+1.1
Two-party-preferred result
National	Roger Wotton		57.3	+3.9
Labor	Jim Curran		42.7	−3.9
National hold		Swing	+3.9	

=== Cessnock ===
1984 New South Wales state election: Cessnock
Party	Candidate	Votes	%	±%
Labor	Stan Neilly	23,519	76.2	−1.3
Liberal	Gerard Berkhout	7,341	23.8	+5.6
Total formal votes		30,860	97.8	0.0
Informal votes		683	2.2	0.0
Turnout		31,543	94.7	+0.2
Labor hold		Swing	−4.3	

=== Charlestown ===
1984 New South Wales state election: Charlestown
Party	Candidate	Votes	%	±%
Labor	Richard Face	19,014	59.0	−9.3
Liberal	Peter Wilson	13,211	41.0	+9.3
Total formal votes		32,225	98.0	+0.6
Informal votes		655	2.0	−0.6
Turnout		32,880	95.6	+2.4
Labor hold		Swing	−9.3	

=== Clarence ===
1984 New South Wales state election: Clarence
Party	Candidate	Votes	%	±%
National	Ian Causley	17,765	52.1	+8.7
Labor	Bill Day	14,630	42.9	−13.7
Independent	Denis O'Keeffe	1,703	5.0	+5.0
Total formal votes		34,098	99.0	+0.3
Informal votes		348	1.0	−0.3
Turnout		34,446	93.5	+0.6
Two-party-preferred result
National	Ian Causley		54.3	+10.9
Labor	Bill Day		45.7	−10.9
National gain from Labor		Swing	+10.9	

=== Coffs Harbour ===
1984 New South Wales state election: Coffs Harbour
Party	Candidate	Votes	%	±%
National	Matt Singleton	21,873	61.3	+2.0
Labor	Laurence Brown	13,789	38.7	−2.0
Total formal votes		35,662	98.4	+0.2
Informal votes		569	1.6	−0.2
Turnout		36,231	91.8	+0.8
National hold		Swing	+2.0	

=== Coogee ===
1984 New South Wales state election: Coogee
Party	Candidate	Votes	%	±%
Labor	Michael Cleary	13,674	52.8	−11.5
Liberal	Ken Finn	10,521	40.6	+7.5
Democrats	Gavan Schneider	1,708	6.6	+6.6
Total formal votes		25,903	97.5	+1.0
Informal votes		658	2.5	−1.0
Turnout		26,561	89.6	+2.5
Two-party-preferred result
Labor	Michael Cleary		56.8	−9.1
Liberal	Ken Finn		43.2	+9.1
Labor hold		Swing	−9.1	

=== Corrimal ===
1984 New South Wales state election: Corrimal
Party	Candidate	Votes	%	±%
Labor	Laurie Kelly	21,068	68.9	−1.1
Liberal	Colin Bruton	9,527	31.1	+9.0
Total formal votes		30,595	97.2	+0.4
Informal votes		874	2.8	−0.4
Turnout		31,469	94.0	+0.9
Labor hold		Swing	−6.8	

=== Cronulla ===
1984 New South Wales state election: Cronulla
Party	Candidate	Votes	%	±%
Liberal	Malcolm Kerr	14,644	50.5	+5.8
Labor	Michael Egan	14,375	49.5	−5.8
Total formal votes		29,019	98.3	+0.2
Informal votes		490	1.7	−0.2
Turnout		29,509	92.7	+1.2
Liberal gain from Labor		Swing	+5.8	

=== Davidson ===
1984 New South Wales state election: Davidson
Party	Candidate	Votes	%	±%
Liberal	Terry Metherell	19,246	63.0	+5.2
Labor	Julie Sutton	9,682	31.7	−10.5
Democrats	Anthony Dunne	1,601	5.2	+5.2
Total formal votes		30,529	98.2	+1.2
Informal votes		567	1.8	−1.2
Turnout		31,096	94.0	+2.4
Two-party-preferred result
Liberal	Terry Metherell		65.5	+7.7
Labor	Julie Sutton		34.5	−7.7
Liberal hold		Swing	+7.7	

=== Drummoyne ===
1984 New South Wales state election: Drummoyne
Party	Candidate	Votes	%	±%
Labor	John Murray	17,002	59.0	−10.2
Liberal	Ben Sonego	11,802	41.0	+17.0
Total formal votes		28,804	96.8	+0.8
Informal votes		953	3.2	−0.8
Turnout		29,757	93.4	+1.8
Labor hold		Swing	−14.8	

=== Dubbo ===
1984 New South Wales state election: Dubbo
Party	Candidate	Votes	%	±%
National	Gerry Peacocke	20,324	64.9	+28.4
Labor	Gordon Lerve	10,973	35.1	−2.4
Total formal votes		31,297	98.5	+0.3
Informal votes		480	1.5	−0.3
Turnout		31,777	92.7	+0.3
National hold		Swing	+5.7	

=== Earlwood ===
1984 New South Wales state election: Earlwood
Party	Candidate	Votes	%	±%
Labor	Ken Gabb	15,528	53.7	−7.0
Liberal	John Ryan	12,534	43.3	+6.7
Democrats	Paul Terrett	862	3.0	+0.3
Total formal votes		28,924	97.2	+0.7
Informal votes		833	2.8	−0.7
Turnout		29,757	94.6	+1.8
Two-party-preferred result
Labor	Ken Gabb		55.2	−7.0
Liberal	John Ryan		44.8	+7.0
Labor hold		Swing	−7.0	

=== East Hills ===
1984 New South Wales state election: East Hills
Party	Candidate	Votes	%	±%
Labor	Pat Rogan	19,206	62.8	−6.1
Liberal	Max Parker	9,477	31.0	+9.1
Democrats	Margaret Vitlin	1,879	6.2	−3.1
Total formal votes		30,562	97.6	+0.8
Informal votes		749	2.4	−0.8
Turnout		31,311	95.1	+1.1
Two-party-preferred result
Labor	Pat Rogan		66.0	−9.8
Liberal	Max Parker		34.0	+9.8
Labor hold		Swing	−9.8	

=== Eastwood ===
1984 New South Wales state election: Eastwood
Party	Candidate	Votes	%	±%
Liberal	Jim Clough	17,937	60.0	+5.0
Labor	Joyce Tuckwell	9,404	31.5	−5.3
Democrats	Christopher Dunkerley	2,545	8.5	+0.2
Total formal votes		29,886	98.2	+0.5
Informal votes		548	1.8	−0.5
Turnout		30,434	93.3	+1.0
Two-party-preferred result
Liberal	Jim Clough		64.8	+5.1
Labor	Joyce Tuckwell		35.2	−5.1
Liberal hold		Swing	+5.1	

=== Elizabeth ===
1984 New South Wales state election: Elizabeth
Party	Candidate	Votes	%	±%
Labor	Pat Hills	14,728	58.1	−18.9
Liberal	Philip Daley	4,447	17.5	+3.3
Independent	Michael Matthews	3,707	14.6	+14.6
Democrats	Jennifer MacLeod	1,939	7.7	+7.7
Independent	Nadar Ponnuswamy	511	2.0	+2.0
Total formal votes		25,332	95.8	+2.4
Informal votes		1,115	4.2	−2.4
Turnout		26,447	85.9	+3.3
Two-party-preferred result
Labor	Pat Hills		72.2	−12.5
Liberal	Philip Daley		27.8	+12.5
Labor hold		Swing	−12.5	

=== Fairfield ===
1984 New South Wales state election: Fairfield
Party	Candidate	Votes	%	±%
Labor	Janice Crosio	20,042	66.4	−13.8
Liberal	Geoffrey Goninon	7,520	24.9	+5.1
Independent	Raymon Wilson	2,602	8.6	+8.6
Total formal votes		30,164	95.7	+1.0
Informal votes		1,365	4.3	−1.0
Turnout		31,529	92.1	+1.9
Two-party-preferred result
Labor	Janice Crosio		71.8	−8.4
Liberal	Geoffrey Goninon		28.2	+8.4
Labor hold		Swing	−8.4	

=== Georges River ===
1984 New South Wales state election: Georges River
Party	Candidate	Votes	%	±%
Labor	Frank Walker	15,792	55.0	−5.9
Liberal	Warren Griffin	12,920	45.0	+18.0
Total formal votes		28,712	97.7	+0.3
Informal votes		686	2.3	−0.3
Turnout		29,398	94.9	+1.4
Labor hold		Swing	−14.0	

=== Gladesville ===
1984 New South Wales state election: Gladesville
Party	Candidate	Votes	%	±%
Labor	Rodney Cavalier	13,818	47.8	−9.4
Liberal	Ivan Petch	10,561	36.5	+0.9
Independent	Michael Lardelli	2,927	10.1	+10.1
Democrats	John Sanders	832	2.9	−4.3
Independent	John Egan	777	2.7	+2.7
Total formal votes		28,915	97.5	+0.8
Informal votes		749	2.5	−0.8
Turnout		29,664	93.7	+1.2
Two-party-preferred result
Labor	Rodney Cavalier		55.5	−4.6
Liberal	Ivan Petch		44.5	+4.6
Labor hold		Swing	−4.6	

=== Gloucester ===
1984 New South Wales state election: Gloucester
Party	Candidate	Votes	%	±%
National	Leon Punch	21,678	61.9	+1.7
Labor	John Eastman	13,360	38.1	−1.7
Total formal votes		35,038	97.8	−0.4
Informal votes		777	2.2	+0.4
Turnout		35,815	94.2	+0.5
National hold		Swing	+1.7	

=== Gordon ===
1984 New South Wales state election: Gordon
Party	Candidate	Votes	%	±%
Liberal	Tim Moore	22,762	77.7	+5.6
Labor	Robert Dubler	5,083	17.4	−3.1
Democrats	Kevin Gartrell-Wardale	1,452	5.0	−2.3
Total formal votes		29,297	98.0	+0.2
Informal votes		602	2.0	−0.2
Turnout		29,899	92.6	+2.2
Two-party-preferred result
Liberal	Tim Moore		80.3	+3.1
Labor	Robert Dubler		19.7	−3.1
Liberal hold		Swing	+3.1	

=== Gosford ===
1984 New South Wales state election: Gosford
Party	Candidate	Votes	%	±%
Labor	Brian McGowan	17,438	46.5	−5.0
Liberal	Chris Hartcher	11,323	30.2	−10.3
National	Donald Leggett	6,548	17.5	+17.5
Democrats	Gary Chestnut	2,168	5.8	+1.3
Total formal votes		37,477	98.4	+0.7
Informal votes		615	1.6	−0.7
Turnout		38,092	93.6	+1.4
Two-party-preferred result
Labor	Brian McGowan	19,147	51.9	−4.9
Liberal	Chris Hartcher	17,734	48.1	+4.9
Labor hold		Swing	−4.9	

=== Goulburn ===
1984 New South Wales state election: Goulburn
Party	Candidate	Votes	%	±%
National	Robert Webster	15,089	49.7	−2.1
Labor	Bob Stephens	13,652	45.0	−3.2
Independent	Miriam Naughton	1,369	4.5	+4.5
Independent	Ronald Sarina	222	0.7	+0.7
Total formal votes		30,332	98.5	+0.2
Informal votes		451	1.5	−0.2
Turnout		30,783	94.1	+1.2
Two-party-preferred result
National	Robert Webster		52.3	+0.4
Labor	Bob Stephens		47.7	−0.4
National hold		Swing	+0.4	

=== Granville ===
1984 New South Wales state election: Granville
Party	Candidate	Votes	%	±%
Labor	Laurie Ferguson	18,810	68.9	−3.1
Liberal	Yvonne Maio	8,476	31.1	+3.1
Total formal votes		27,286	96.2	+1.7
Informal votes		1,084	3.8	−1.7
Turnout		28,370	92.4	+1.3
Labor hold		Swing	−3.1	

=== Hawkesbury ===
1984 New South Wales state election: Hawkesbury
Party	Candidate	Votes	%	±%
Liberal	Kevin Rozzoli	23,128	68.0	+9.5
Labor	Harmanus Toorneman	10,862	32.0	−2.0
Total formal votes		33,990	97.6	+0.6
Informal votes		832	2.4	−0.6
Turnout		34,822	90.8	+1.1
Liberal hold		Swing	+5.2	

=== Heathcote ===
1984 New South Wales state election: Heathcote
Party	Candidate	Votes	%	±%
Labor	Rex Jackson	16,582	55.6	−11.7
Liberal	Gordon Davies	10,052	33.7	+10.0
Democrats	Fran Johnson	3,179	10.7	+6.4
Total formal votes		29,813	97.7	+0.2
Informal votes		711	2.3	−0.2
Turnout		30,524	94.6	+1.2
Two-party-preferred result
Labor	Rex Jackson		61.1	−12.0
Liberal	Gordon Davies		38.9	+12.0
Labor hold		Swing	−12.0	

=== Heffron ===
1984 New South Wales state election: Heffron
Party	Candidate	Votes	%	±%
Labor	Laurie Brereton	18,536	65.6	−11.9
Liberal	Barry Devine	9,730	34.4	+11.9
Total formal votes		28,266	96.1	+1.3
Informal votes		1,137	3.9	−1.3
Turnout		29,403	92.3	+2.3
Labor hold		Swing	−11.9	

=== Hornsby ===
1984 New South Wales state election: Hornsby
Party	Candidate	Votes	%	±%
Liberal	Neil Pickard	18,177	56.7	+5.2
Labor	Christopher Gorrick	12,339	38.5	−5.5
Democrats	Michael Pettigrew	1,520	4.7	+1.5
Total formal votes		32,036	98.3	+1.0
Informal votes		562	1.7	−1.0
Turnout		32,598	92.3	−0.6
Two-party-preferred result
Liberal	Neil Pickard		59.2	+5.4
Labor	Christopher Gorrick		40.8	−5.4
Liberal hold		Swing	+5.4	

=== Hurstville ===
1984 New South Wales state election: Hurstville
Party	Candidate	Votes	%	±%
Liberal	Guy Yeomans	14,427	50.9	+11.7
Labor	Kevin Ryan	13,896	49.1	−8.2
Total formal votes		28,323	97.7	+0.3
Informal votes		657	2.3	−0.3
Turnout		28,980	93.3	+1.6
Liberal gain from Labor		Swing	+10.1	

=== Illawarra ===
1984 New South Wales state election: Illawarra
Party	Candidate	Votes	%	±%
Labor	George Petersen	20,774	65.6	−3.5
Liberal	Dennis Owen	8,451	26.7	+11.0
Democrats	James Kay	2,444	7.7	0.0
Total formal votes		31,669	97.0	+2.0
Informal votes		989	3.0	−2.0
Turnout		32,658	93.6	+0.5
Two-party-preferred result
Labor	George Petersen		69.6	−10.0
Liberal	Dennis Owen		30.4	+10.0
Labor hold		Swing	−10.0	

=== Ingleburn ===
1984 New South Wales state election: Ingleburn
Party	Candidate	Votes	%	±%
Labor	Stan Knowles	18,554	63.0	−1.3
Liberal	Gary Lucas	10,897	37.0	+1.3
Total formal votes		29,451	96.5	+1.3
Informal votes		1,067	3.5	−1.3
Turnout		30,518	90.7	+0.8
Labor hold		Swing	−1.3	

=== Kiama ===
1984 New South Wales state election: Kiama
Party	Candidate	Votes	%	±%
Labor	Bill Knott	19,636	58.7	−1.2
Liberal	Warren Steel	13,797	41.3	+1.2
Total formal votes		33,433	98.0	−0.9
Informal votes		684	2.0	+0.9
Turnout		34,117	93.3	+1.2
Labor hold		Swing	−1.2	

=== Kogarah ===
1984 New South Wales state election: Kogarah
Party	Candidate	Votes	%	±%
Labor	Brian Langton	15,254	53.1	−9.9
Liberal	Robert Young	11,804	41.0	+8.8
Democrats	Ronald George	1,697	5.9	+1.1
Total formal votes		28,755	97.4	−0.2
Informal votes		780	2.6	+0.2
Turnout		29,535	93.7	+1.8
Two-party-preferred result
Labor	Brian Langton		56.3	−3.6
Liberal	Robert Young		43.7	+3.6
Labor hold		Swing	−3.6	

=== Ku-ring-gai ===
1984 New South Wales state election: Ku-ring-gai
Party	Candidate	Votes	%	±%
Liberal	Nick Greiner	24,271	77.8	+11.2
Labor	Ian Cameron	5,096	16.3	−7.2
Democrats	Pamela Tuckwell	1,829	5.9	−4.1
Total formal votes		31,196	98.4	+0.9
Informal votes		500	1.6	−0.9
Turnout		31,696	92.5	+1.8
Two-party-preferred result
Liberal	Nick Greiner		80.9	+10.1
Labor	Ian Cameron		19.1	−10.1
Liberal hold		Swing	+10.1	

=== Lachlan ===
1984 New South Wales state election: Lachlan
Party	Candidate	Votes	%	±%
National	Ian Armstrong	19,108	65.9	+7.2
Labor	Tim West	9,885	34.1	−7.2
Total formal votes		28,993	98.8	+1.1
Informal votes		346	1.2	−1.1
Turnout		29,339	93.4	+1.0
National hold		Swing	+7.2	

=== Lake Macquarie ===
1984 New South Wales state election: Lake Macquarie
Party	Candidate	Votes	%	±%
Labor	Merv Hunter	20,145	57.8	−8.7
Liberal	Edward Hayes	11,694	33.5	+9.3
Democrats	Edwina Wilson	3,025	8.7	−0.6
Total formal votes		34,864	97.9	+0.2
Informal votes		761	2.1	−0.2
Turnout		35,625	93.6	+0.7
Two-party-preferred result
Labor	Merv Hunter		62.2	−9.5
Liberal	Edward Hayes		37.8	+9.5
Labor hold		Swing	−9.5	

=== Lakemba ===
1984 New South Wales state election: Lakemba
Party	Candidate	Votes	%	±%
Labor	Wes Davoren	16,398	61.8	−16.8
Liberal	Stephen Law	10,125	38.2	+16.8
Total formal votes		26,523	95.7	+0.3
Informal votes		1,190	4.3	−0.3
Turnout		27,713	91.6	+1.0
Labor hold		Swing	−16.8	

=== Lane Cove ===
1984 New South Wales state election: Lane Cove
Party	Candidate	Votes	%	±%
Liberal	John Dowd	17,720	65.6	+7.5
Labor	Miron Shapira	7,446	27.6	−4.1
Democrats	Graham Baker	1,831	6.8	+0.2
Total formal votes		26,997	98.1	+0.5
Informal votes		515	1.9	−0.5
Turnout		27,512	91.4	+2.0
Two-party-preferred result
Liberal	John Dowd		69.2	+5.1
Labor	Miron Shapira		30.8	−5.1
Liberal hold		Swing	+5.1	

=== Lismore ===
1984 New South Wales state election: Lismore
Party	Candidate	Votes	%	±%
Independent Country	Bruce Duncan	25,227	75.7	+75.7
Labor	Claire Newton	7,340	22.0	−9.1
Democrats	Ivor Brown	767	2.3	+2.3
Total formal votes		33,334	98.9	+0.7
Informal votes		381	1.1	−0.7
Turnout		33,715	92.5	+0.8
Two-candidate-preferred result
Independent Country	Bruce Duncan		76.9	+76.9
Labor	Claire Newton		23.1	−8.0
Member changed to Independent Country from National		Swing	N/A	

=== Liverpool ===
1984 New South Wales state election: Liverpool
Party	Candidate	Votes	%	±%
Labor	George Paciullo	18,382	68.6	−7.9
Liberal	Anthony Garbin	6,552	24.5	+6.7
Independent	David Bransdon	1,855	6.9	+3.7
Total formal votes		26,789	96.1	+0.6
Informal votes		1,073	3.9	−0.6
Turnout		27,862	91.2	+0.5
Two-party-preferred result
Labor	George Paciullo		72.2	−8.2
Liberal	Anthony Garbin		27.8	+8.2
Labor hold		Swing	−8.2	

=== Maitland ===
1984 New South Wales state election: Maitland
Party	Candidate	Votes	%	±%
Labor	Allan Walsh	18,178	56.9	+3.9
Liberal	Donald Wilkinson	9,704	30.4	−6.5
National	Robert Gee	4,052	12.7	+12.7
Total formal votes		31,934	98.6	+0.2
Informal votes		437	1.4	−0.2
Turnout		32,371	94.5	0.0
Two-party-preferred result
Labor	Allan Walsh		58.9	+1.4
Liberal	Donald Wilkinson		41.1	−1.4
Labor hold		Swing	+1.4	

=== Manly ===
1984 New South Wales state election: Manly
Party	Candidate	Votes	%	±%
Liberal	David Hay	14,772	50.7	+4.1
Labor	Alan Stewart	12,156	41.7	−7.2
Independent	Joan Cooke	1,015	3.5	+3.5
Democrats	Robert Leys	945	3.2	+3.2
Independent	Margaret Lee	266	0.9	+0.9
Total formal votes		29,154	97.7	+0.1
Informal votes		674	2.3	−0.1
Turnout		29,828	91.1	+1.8
Two-party-preferred result
Liberal	David Hay		54.5	+5.7
Labor	Alan Stewart		45.5	−5.7
Liberal gain from Labor		Swing	+5.7	

=== Maroubra ===
1984 New South Wales state election: Maroubra
Party	Candidate	Votes	%	±%
Labor	Bob Carr	18,569	63.2	−5.6
Liberal	Phillip Abadee	10,804	36.8	+5.6
Total formal votes		29,373	96.6	+1.1
Informal votes		1,024	3.4	−1.1
Turnout		30,397	92.4	+1.5
Labor hold		Swing	−5.6	

=== Marrickville ===
1984 New South Wales state election: Marrickville
Party	Candidate	Votes	%	±%
Labor	Andrew Refshauge	16,890	66.3	−5.0
Liberal	Peter Rout	5,422	21.3	+2.0
Democrats	Michael Walsh	3,164	12.4	+9.4
Total formal votes		25,476	95.2	+1.8
Informal votes		1,297	4.8	−1.8
Turnout		26,773	90.3	+2.9
Two-party-preferred result
Labor	Andrew Refshauge		73.4	−4.6
Liberal	Peter Rout		26.6	+4.6
Labor hold		Swing	−4.6	

=== Merrylands ===
1984 New South Wales state election: Merrylands
Party	Candidate	Votes	%	±%
Labor	Geoff Irwin	17,874	63.7	−11.6
Liberal	Garo Gabrielian	8,159	29.1	+4.4
Independent	Alan Byers	2,045	7.3	+7.3
Total formal votes		28,078	96.0	+0.7
Informal votes		1,156	4.0	−0.7
Turnout		29,234	93.9	+1.5
Two-party-preferred result
Labor	Geoff Irwin		67.4	−7.9
Liberal	Garo Gabrielian		32.6	+7.9
Labor hold		Swing	−7.9	

=== Miranda ===
1984 New South Wales state election: Miranda
Party	Candidate	Votes	%	±%
Liberal	Ron Phillips	15,242	50.3	+6.9
Labor	Bill Robb	14,176	46.8	−5.0
Democrats	Michael Moriarty	890	2.9	−1.9
Total formal votes		30,308	98.4	+0.7
Informal votes		497	1.6	−0.7
Turnout		30,805	94.6	+1.7
Two-party-preferred result
Liberal	Ron Phillips		51.8	+6.1
Labor	Bill Robb		48.2	−6.1
Liberal gain from Labor		Swing	+6.1	

=== Monaro ===
1984 New South Wales state election: Monaro
Party	Candidate	Votes	%	±%
Labor	John Akister	17,403	55.3	−4.5
Liberal	John Munro	11,800	37.5	+7.1
National	Ronald Formann	2,245	7.1	−1.1
Total formal votes		31,448	97.9	0.0
Informal votes		678	2.1	0.0
Turnout		32,126	89.7	−0.1
Two-party-preferred result
Labor	John Akister		55.9	−5.5
Liberal	John Munro		44.1	+5.5
Labor hold		Swing	−5.5	

=== Mosman ===
1984 New South Wales state election: Mosman
Party	Candidate	Votes	%	±%
Liberal	Phillip Smiles	16,426	58.6	−5.6
Labor	Liliane Leroy	5,693	20.3	−15.5
Independent	Dom Lopez	4,574	16.3	+16.3
Democrats	Christine Townend	1,353	4.8	+4.8
Total formal votes		28,046	98.2	+1.1
Informal votes		502	1.8	−1.1
Turnout		28,548	90.8	+4.0
Two-party-preferred result
Liberal	Phillip Smiles		69.5	+5.2
Labor	Liliane Leroy		30.5	−5.2
Liberal hold		Swing	+5.2	

=== Murray ===
1984 New South Wales state election: Murray
Party	Candidate	Votes	%	±%
National	Tim Fischer	19,144	67.9	+0.9
Labor	Michael Anthony	6,584	23.4	−4.7
Independent	John Murphy	1,721	6.1	+6.1
Democrats	Gregory Butler	732	2.6	−2.3
Total formal votes		28,181	98.5	+0.2
Informal votes		432	1.5	−0.2
Turnout		28,613	88.7	+1.1
Two-party-preferred result
National	Tim Fischer		72.6	+3.5
Labor	Michael Anthony		27.4	−3.5
National hold		Swing	+3.5	

=== Murrumbidgee ===
1984 New South Wales state election: Murrumbidgee
Party	Candidate	Votes	%	±%
Labor	Margaret Delves	11,917	38.7	−14.8
Independent	Thomas Marriott	8,281	26.9	+4.9
National	Adrian Cruickshank	7,773	25.2	+0.5
Liberal	Brian Thornton	2,857	9.3	+9.3
Total formal votes		30,828	98.7	+0.2
Informal votes		391	1.3	−0.2
Turnout		31,219	92.1	+0.4
Two-party-preferred result
National	Adrian Cruickshank	15,132	51.5	+15.4
Labor	Margaret Delves	14,241	48.5	−15.4
National gain from Labor		Swing	+15.4	

=== Newcastle ===
1984 New South Wales state election: Newcastle
Party	Candidate	Votes	%	±%
Labor	Arthur Wade	18,143	57.0	−7.9
Liberal	Patricia Forsythe	9,195	28.9	−0.4
Democrats	Stephen Jeffries	3,721	11.7	+11.7
Independent	Frank Blefari	772	2.4	+2.4
Total formal votes		31,831	97.6	+1.2
Informal votes		770	2.4	−1.2
Turnout		32,601	92.5	+1.0
Two-party-preferred result
Labor	Arthur Wade		64.4	−6.5
Liberal	Patricia Forsythe		35.6	+6.5
Labor hold		Swing	−6.5	

=== Northcott ===
1984 New South Wales state election: Northcott
Party	Candidate	Votes	%	±%
Liberal	Bruce Baird	23,048	66.9	+5.6
Labor	Jan Dekker	9,149	26.6	−6.4
Democrats	Clifford Wiltshire	2,236	6.5	+0.9
Total formal votes		34,433	98.2	+0.9
Informal votes		647	1.8	−0.9
Turnout		35,080	93.2	+1.5
Two-party-preferred result
Liberal	Bruce Baird		70.0	+5.9
Labor	Jan Dekker		30.0	−5.9
Liberal hold		Swing	+5.9	

=== Northern Tablelands ===
1984 New South Wales state election: Northern Tablelands
Party	Candidate	Votes	%	±%
Labor	Bill McCarthy	15,335	51.6	−1.3
National	Claude Cainero	14,383	48.4	+1.3
Total formal votes		29,718	98.8	+0.4
Informal votes		364	1.2	−0.4
Turnout		30,082	94.1	+1.9
Labor hold		Swing	−1.3	

=== North Shore ===
1984 New South Wales state election: North Shore
Party	Candidate	Votes	%	±%
Independent	Ted Mack	11,122	42.2	+13.5
Liberal	Jillian Skinner	10,850	41.2	−0.4
Labor	Peter Semmler	4,365	16.6	−11.6
Total formal votes		26,337	98.4	−0.1
Informal votes		436	1.6	+0.1
Turnout		26,773	88.5	+4.4
Two-candidate-preferred result
Independent	Ted Mack	15,043	57.7	+3.1
Liberal	Jillian Skinner	11,037	42.3	−3.1
Independent hold		Swing	+3.1	

=== Orange ===
1984 New South Wales state election: Orange
Party	Candidate	Votes	%	±%
National	Garry West	17,156	58.0	+4.5
Labor	Trevor Jaeger	12,423	42.0	−4.5
Total formal votes		29,579	98.7	+0.6
Informal votes		379	1.3	−0.6
Turnout		29,958	94.4	+1.1
National hold		Swing	+4.5	

=== Oxley ===
1984 New South Wales state election: Oxley
Party	Candidate	Votes	%	±%
National	Bruce Jeffery	15,769	43.9	−17.6
Labor	George Viskauskas	10,457	29.1	−9.4
Independent	John Barrett	8,677	24.2	+24.2
Democrats	William Giles	997	2.8	+2.8
Total formal votes		35,900	98.6	+0.6
Informal votes		511	1.4	−0.6
Turnout		36,411	90.3	−2.9
Two-party-preferred result
National	Bruce Jeffery	21,387	62.7	+1.2
Labor	George Viskauskas	12,699	37.3	−1.2
National hold		Swing	+1.2	

=== Parramatta ===
1984 New South Wales state election: Parramatta
Party	Candidate	Votes	%	±%
Labor	Barry Wilde	14,392	49.5	−7.2
Liberal	John Worthington	10,558	36.3	+10.2
Independent	Kenneth Hale	3,385	11.6	+11.6
Democrats	John Macrae	752	2.6	0.0
Total formal votes		29,087	96.8	+0.5
Informal votes		960	3.2	−0.5
Turnout		30,047	90.9	+1.7
Two-party-preferred result
Labor	Barry Wilde		55.3	−10.4
Liberal	John Worthington		44.7	+10.4
Labor hold		Swing	−10.4	

=== Peats ===
1984 New South Wales state election: Peats
Party	Candidate	Votes	%	±%
Labor	Paul Landa	17,789	59.7	−4.8
Liberal	Jim Lloyd	9,959	33.4	+8.4
Democrats	John Aitken	2,065	6.9	−3.6
Total formal votes		29,813	98.2	+1.9
Informal votes		539	1.8	−1.9
Turnout		30,352	93.3	+2.0
Two-party-preferred result
Labor	Paul Landa		63.2	−7.2
Liberal	Jim Lloyd		36.8	+7.2
Labor hold		Swing	−7.2	

=== Penrith ===
1984 New South Wales state election: Penrith
Party	Candidate	Votes	%	±%
Labor	Peter Anderson	21,794	58.8	−12.0
Liberal	Ross Shuttleworth	11,545	31.1	+1.9
Democrats	Kevin Crameri	2,576	7.0	+7.0
Independent	Ian Perry	1,150	3.1	+3.1
Total formal votes		37,065	97.4	+0.5
Informal votes		968	2.6	−0.5
Turnout		38,033	93.2	+1.0
Two-party-preferred result
Labor	Peter Anderson		64.3	−6.5
Liberal	Ross Shuttleworth		35.7	+6.5
Labor hold		Swing	−6.5	

=== Pittwater ===
1984 New South Wales state election: Pittwater
Party	Candidate	Votes	%	±%
Liberal	Max Smith	17,452	58.1	−2.8
Labor	Denise Morgan	8,290	27.6	−11.5
Independent	John Webeck	3,035	10.1	+10.1
Democrats	Graeme MacLennan	1,249	4.2	+4.2
Total formal votes		30,026	97.8	+1.6
Informal votes		661	2.2	−1.6
Turnout		30,687	91.5	+3.1
Two-party-preferred result
Liberal	Max Smith		65.5	+4.6
Labor	Denise Morgan		34.5	−4.6
Liberal hold		Swing	+4.6	

=== Riverstone ===
1984 New South Wales state election: Riverstone
Party	Candidate	Votes	%	±%
Labor	Richard Amery	17,731	64.9	−6.2
Liberal	Kenneth Jessup	9,608	35.1	+10.5
Total formal votes		27,339	95.1	+0.5
Informal votes		1,395	4.9	−0.5
Turnout		28,734	92.3	+2.2
Labor hold		Swing	−8.3	

=== Rockdale ===
1984 New South Wales state election: Rockdale
Party	Candidate	Votes	%	±%
Labor	Brian Bannon	18,015	63.3	−5.9
Liberal	Bob Gemmell	9,705	34.1	+3.3
Independent	Edwin Bellchambers	755	2.6	+2.6
Total formal votes		28,475	96.7	+0.6
Informal votes		968	3.3	−0.6
Turnout		29,443	92.8	+1.4
Two-party-preferred result
Labor	Brian Bannon		64.6	−4.6
Liberal	Bob Gemmell		35.4	+4.6
Labor hold		Swing	−4.6	

=== Ryde ===
1984 New South Wales state election: Ryde
Party	Candidate	Votes	%	±%
Labor	Garry McIlwaine	14,059	51.5	−5.5
Liberal	Ian Kortlang	11,163	40.9	+3.7
Democrats	Peter Chambers	2,093	7.7	+1.9
Total formal votes		27,315	97.1	+0.7
Informal votes		816	2.9	−0.7
Turnout		28,131	92.8	+2.2
Two-party-preferred result
Labor	Garry McIlwaine		54.9	−5.4
Liberal	Ian Kortlang		45.1	+5.4
Labor hold		Swing	−5.4	

=== St Marys ===
1984 New South Wales state election: St Marys
Party	Candidate	Votes	%	±%
Labor	Ron Mulock	22,662	66.6	−10.9
Liberal	Daryl Chamberlain	9,826	28.9	+6.4
Democrats	Viv Carter	1,526	4.5	+4.5
Total formal votes		34,014	97.2	+1.3
Informal votes		961	2.8	−1.3
Turnout		34,975	91.8	+1.2
Two-party-preferred result
Labor	Ron Mulock		69.0	−8.5
Liberal	Daryl Chamberlain		31.0	+8.5
Labor hold		Swing	−8.5	

=== Seven Hills ===
1984 New South Wales state election: Seven Hills
Party	Candidate	Votes	%	±%
Labor	Bob Christie	16,726	60.1	−4.7
Liberal	Marc Clifford	11,090	39.9	+12.8
Total formal votes		27,816	96.9	+1.0
Informal votes		894	3.1	−1.0
Turnout		28,710	93.1	+1.3
Labor hold		Swing	−9.9	

=== South Coast ===
1984 New South Wales state election: South Coast
Party	Candidate	Votes	%	±%
Independent	John Hatton	21,497	61.4	
Labor	Robyn Drysdale	6,906	19.7	
Liberal	David Egan	6,633	18.9	
Total formal votes		35,036	98.6	
Informal votes		503	1.4	
Turnout		35,539	92.5	
Two-candidate-preferred result
Independent	John Hatton		76.0	
Labor	Robyn Drysdale		24.0	
Independent hold		Swing	N/A	

- Hatton was elected unopposed at the previous election.

=== Swansea ===
1984 New South Wales state election: Swansea
Party	Candidate	Votes	%	±%
Labor	Don Bowman	21,913	65.0	−6.2
Liberal	Milton Caine	7,718	22.9	+7.1
Socialist Labour	Ann Leahy	2,113	6.3	+6.3
Democrats	Lyn Godfrey	1,985	5.9	−7.0
Total formal votes		33,729	97.1	+0.7
Informal votes		1,008	2.9	−0.7
Turnout		34,737	94.1	+0.9
Two-party-preferred result
Labor	Don Bowman		72.2	−6.6
Liberal	Milton Caine		27.8	+6.6
Labor hold		Swing	−6.6	

=== Tamworth ===
1984 New South Wales state election: Tamworth
Party	Candidate	Votes	%	±%
National	Noel Park	18,639	59.1	+0.7
Labor	Garry Ryan	10,459	33.1	−2.6
Democrats	Anne Irvine	2,463	7.8	+1.9
Total formal votes		31,561	98.9	+0.9
Informal votes		354	1.1	−0.9
Turnout		31,915	94.1	+1.1
Two-party-preferred result
National	Noel Park		63.4	+1.3
Labor	Garry Ryan		36.6	−1.3
National hold		Swing	+1.3	

=== The Hills ===
1984 New South Wales state election: The Hills
Party	Candidate	Votes	%	±%
Liberal	Fred Caterson	19,649	62.0	+2.5
Labor	Barry Calvert	7,807	24.6	−10.2
Independent	John Griffiths	2,923	9.2	+9.2
Democrats	Toni Chapman	1,322	4.2	−1.5
Total formal votes		31,701	97.9	+0.2
Informal votes		677	2.1	−0.2
Turnout		32,378	92.7	+0.9
Two-party-preferred result
Liberal	Fred Caterson		68.9	+7.2
Labor	Barry Calvert		31.1	−7.2
Liberal hold		Swing	+7.2	

=== Tuggerah ===
1984 New South Wales state election: Tuggerah
Party	Candidate	Votes	%	±%
Labor	Harry Moore	18,345	55.8	−3.3
Liberal	Leslie Nunn	10,416	31.7	+2.1
Independent	Clem Payne	2,664	8.1	+8.1
Democrats	Lynn Sawyer	1,438	4.4	−6.9
Total formal votes		32,863	97.7	+0.4
Informal votes		766	2.3	−0.4
Turnout		33,629	93.2	+2.2
Two-party-preferred result
Labor	Harry Moore		61.8	−5.0
Liberal	Leslie Nunn		38.2	+5.0
Labor hold		Swing	−5.0	

=== Upper Hunter ===
1984 New South Wales state election: Upper Hunter
Party	Candidate	Votes	%	±%
National	Col Fisher	18,999	59.5	+3.1
Labor	Colleen Green	12,926	40.5	−3.1
Total formal votes		31,925	98.6	+0.6
Informal votes		456	1.4	−0.6
Turnout		32,381	93.9	+1.1
National hold		Swing	+3.1	

=== Vaucluse ===
1984 New South Wales state election: Vaucluse
Party	Candidate	Votes	%	±%
Liberal	Rosemary Foot	19,331	72.4	+7.8
Labor	David Curtis	6,271	23.5	−1.5
Democrats	Joseph Zingarelli	1,080	4.1	−0.2
Total formal votes		26,682	97.0	+0.8
Informal votes		823	3.0	−0.8
Turnout		27,505	88.8	+2.5
Two-party-preferred result
Liberal	Rosemary Foot		74.6	+4.5
Labor	David Curtis		25.4	−4.5
Liberal hold		Swing	+4.5	

=== Wagga Wagga ===
1984 New South Wales state election: Wagga Wagga
Party	Candidate	Votes	%	±%
Liberal	Joe Schipp	18,923	61.3	+10.0
Labor	Barry Leal	10,339	33.5	−4.2
Democrats	Scott Milne	1,609	5.2	−5.7
Total formal votes		30,871	98.5	0.0
Informal votes		456	1.5	0.0
Turnout		31,327	92.3	+0.2
Two-party-preferred result
Liberal	Joe Schipp		64.0	+9.7
Labor	Barry Leal		36.0	−9.7
Liberal hold		Swing	+9.7	

=== Wakehurst ===
1984 New South Wales state election: Wakehurst
Party	Candidate	Votes	%	±%
Liberal	John Booth	13,767	49.2	+7.6
Labor	Tom Webster	13,038	46.6	+8.7
Independent	Maurice Foley	606	2.2	+2.2
Democrats	Laurence Bourke	581	2.1	−1.0
Total formal votes		27,992	97.6	+0.6
Informal votes		680	2.4	−0.6
Turnout		28,672	91.6	+1.6
Two-party-preferred result
Liberal	John Booth		51.2	+8.2
Labor	Tom Webster		48.8	−8.2
Liberal gain from Labor		Swing	+8.2	

=== Wallsend ===
1984 New South Wales state election: Wallsend
Party	Candidate	Votes	%	±%
Labor	Ken Booth	19,435	64.3	–10.1
Liberal	Garry Carter	10,804	35.7	+10.1
Total formal votes		30,239	97.9	+0.6
Informal votes		660	2.1	–0.6
Turnout		30,899	95.4	+0.9
Labor hold		Swing	−10.1	

=== Waratah ===
1984 New South Wales state election: Waratah
Party	Candidate	Votes	%	±%
Labor	John Price	13,641	46.8	−23.4
Liberal	Ashley Saunders	7,314	25.1	−0.6
Independent	Sam Jones	6,926	23.8	+23.8
Democrats	Wayne Jarman	1,078	3.7	+3.7
Independent	John Cain	205	0.7	+0.7
Total formal votes		29,164	97.7	+0.6
Informal votes		677	2.3	−0.6
Turnout		29,841	94.5	+1.0
Two-party-preferred result
Labor	John Price	15,816	63.2	−10.4
Liberal	Ashley Saunders	9,220	36.8	+10.4
Labor hold		Swing	−10.4	

=== Waverley ===
1984 New South Wales state election: Waverley
Party	Candidate	Votes	%	±%
Labor	Ernie Page	13,255	49.2	−12.7
Liberal	Dick Davidson	11,279	41.8	+3.7
Democrats	Heather Meers	1,722	6.4	+6.4
Independent	Peter Kristofferson	483	1.8	+1.8
Independent	Dorothy Sekers	225	0.8	+0.8
Total formal votes		26,964	96.4	+1.2
Informal votes		1,009	3.6	−1.2
Turnout		27,973	86.7	+0.9
Two-party-preferred result
Labor	Ernie Page	14,266	53.7	−8.2
Liberal	Dick Davidson	12,326	46.3	+8.2
Labor hold		Swing	−8.2	

=== Wentworthville ===
1984 New South Wales state election: Wentworthville
Party	Candidate	Votes	%	±%
Labor	Ernie Quinn	14,593	50.9	−11.7
Liberal	Colin Edwards	11,962	41.7	+4.3
Democrats	David Knight	2,107	7.4	+7.4
Total formal votes		28,662	97.0	+1.0
Informal votes		876	3.0	−1.0
Turnout		29,538	94.3	+0.8
Two-party-preferred result
Labor	Ernie Quinn		54.6	−8.0
Liberal	Colin Edwards		45.4	+8.0
Labor hold		Swing	−8.0	

=== Willoughby ===
1984 New South Wales state election: Willoughby
Party	Candidate	Votes	%	±%
Liberal	Peter Collins	17,391	63.2	+13.3
Labor	Eddie Britt	8,974	32.6	−10.4
Democrats	Sean Turkington	1,154	4.2	+4.2
Total formal votes		27,519	97.7	+0.8
Informal votes		658	2.3	−0.8
Turnout		28,177	91.7	+2.7
Two-party-preferred result
Liberal	Peter Collins		65.4	+11.7
Labor	Eddie Britt		34.6	−11.7
Liberal hold		Swing	+11.7	

=== Wollongong ===
1984 New South Wales state election: Wollongong
Party	Candidate	Votes	%	±%
Independent	Frank Arkell	13,429	44.7	+3.3
Labor	Rex Connor	13,057	43.5	−3.0
Liberal	Ronald Brooks	2,809	9.4	+1.2
Independent	Phillip Xenos	325	1.1	+1.1
Independent	Rudolph Dezelin	213	0.7	+0.7
Independent	Julius Kudrynski	177	0.6	+0.6
Total formal votes		30,010	96.3	+0.3
Informal votes		1,136	3.7	−0.3
Turnout		31,146	93.3	+1.4
Two-candidate-preferred result
Independent	Frank Arkell	15,959	54.2	+4.3
Labor	Rex Connor	13,508	45.8	−4.3
Independent gain from Labor		Swing	+4.3	

=== Woronora ===
1984 New South Wales state election: Woronora
Party	Candidate	Votes	%	±%
Labor	Maurice Keane	17,490	51.2	−10.9
Liberal	Chris Downy	15,221	44.5	+6.6
Democrats	Ronald Hellyer	1,462	4.3	+4.3
Total formal votes		34,173	98.2	+0.6
Informal votes		634	1.8	−0.6
Turnout		34,807	95.2	+1.4
Two-party-preferred result
Labor	Maurice Keane		53.3	−8.8
Liberal	Chris Downy		46.7	+8.8
Labor hold		Swing	−8.8	

== See also ==
- Results of the 1984 New South Wales state election (Legislative Council)
- Candidates of the 1984 New South Wales state election
- Members of the New South Wales Legislative Assembly, 1984–1988

== Bibliography ==
- Hughes, Colin A. (1986). A handbook of Australian government and politics, 1975-1984. ANU Press. ISBN 0-08-033038-X.
