= 1986 Vaucluse state by-election =

- 31 May 1986

Electoral district of Vaucluse in the New South Wales Legislative Assembly
	First party	Second party
		DEM
Candidate	Ray Aston	Yvonne Jayawardena
Party	Liberal	Democrats
Primary vote	13,245	1,978
Percentage	72.6%	10.8%
Swing	▲0.2	▲6.8
MP before election
Rosemary Foot
Liberal
Elected MP
Ray Aston
Liberal

A by-election for the seat of Vaucluse in the New South Wales Legislative Assembly was held on 31 May 1986. The by-election was triggered by the resignation of Liberal MP and deputy leader Rosemary Foot.

The by-election for the seats of Pittwater was held on the same day.

== Dates ==
Date	Event
13 February 1986	Resignation of Rosemary Foot.
2 May 1986	Writ of election issued by the Speaker of the Legislative Assembly.
8 May 1986	Day of nominations
31 May 2016	Polling day
20 June 1986	Return of writ

== Results ==
1986 Vaucluse by-election Saturday 31 May
Party	Candidate	Votes	%	±%
Liberal	Ray Aston	13,245	72.6	+0.2
Democrats	Yvonne Jayawardena	1,978	10.8	+6.8
Call to Australia	Elaine Nile	1,173	6.4	
Nuclear Free Australia	Gillian Fisher	931	5.1	
Nuclear Disarmament	Robert Wood	732	4.0	
Uninflated Movement	Nadar Ponnuswamy	99	0.5	
Small Business and Enterprise Party	Stanley Fitzroy-Mendis	81	0.4	
Total formal votes		18,239	96.3	−0.8
Informal votes		711	3.8	+0.8
Turnout		18,950	61.1 (Note: Estimate based on a roll of 30,993 at the 1984 election.)	−27.6
Liberal hold				

== See also ==
- Electoral results for the district of Vaucluse
- List of New South Wales state by-elections
