= Yabsley =

- Language: English

Origin
- Origin: Ebberly House, recorded as Yabberley in 1641
- Region of origin: Devon

Yabsley is an English-language toponymic surname. Notable people with the surname include:

- Jack Yabsley (born 1985), Australian television presenter
- Lorna Yabsley (born 1964), British actress
- Michael Yabsley (born 1956), Australian politician
- William Yabsley (1812–1880), Australian shipwright
