= 1994 Vaucluse state by-election =

Election result for Vaucluse, New South Wales, Australia

A by-election was held in the New South Wales state electoral district of Vaucluse on 9 April 1994. The by-election was triggered by the resignation of Michael Yabsley (Liberal).

== Dates ==
Date	Event
18 March 1994	Resignation of Michael Yabsley.
21 March 1994	Writ of election issued by the Speaker of the Legislative Assembly.
24 March 1994	Day of nomination
9 April 1994	Polling day
22 April 1994	Return of writ

== Results ==
1994 Vaucluse by-election Saturday 9 April
Party	Candidate	Votes	%	±%
Liberal	Peter Debnam	15,757	58.5	+3.4
Labor	Barbara Armitage	7,856	29.2	+11.8
Greens	Murray Matson	2,453	9.1	
Independent	Rodney Marks	870	3.2	
Total formal votes		26,936	97.1	+6.4
Informal votes		808	2.9	−6.4
Turnout		27,744	70.7	−19.4
Two-party-preferred result
Liberal	Peter Debnam	16,621	63.3	+0.3
Labor	Barbara Armitage	9,645	36.7	
Liberal hold		Swing		

== See also ==
- Electoral results for the district of Vaucluse
- List of New South Wales state by-elections
