= 1936 Vaucluse state by-election =

Election result for Vaucluse, New South Wales, Australia

A by-election was held for the New South Wales Legislative Assembly electorate of Vaucluse on 29 August 1936 because of the death of United Australia Party member William Foster. The election was a contest between sons of politicians and both supported the UAP. The pre-selected UAP candidate was Hugh Foster, the son of the former member, while Murray Robson, the son of a long serving NSW UAP politician, William Robson, ran as an independent, having been an active supporter of the UAP, stating in his campaign that "I am a supporter of the UAP and of the Government".

== Dates ==
Date	Event
21 July 1936	Death of William Foster.
7 August 1936	Writ of election issued by the Speaker of the Legislative Assembly.
14 August 1936	Nominations
29 August 1936	Polling day
11 September 1936	Return of writ

== Results ==
1936 Vaucluse by-election Saturday 29 August
Party	Candidate	Votes	%	±%
Ind. United Australia	Murray Robson	10,563	62.6	
United Australia	Hugh Foster	6,304	37.4	
Total formal votes		16,867	97.3	
Informal votes		470	2.7	
Turnout		17,337	82.92	
Ind. United Australia gain from United Australia		Swing		

== See also ==
- Electoral results for the district of Vaucluse
- List of New South Wales state by-elections
