= 1988 Vaucluse state by-election =

Election result for Vaucluse, New South Wales, Australia

A by-election was held for the New South Wales Legislative Assembly electorate of Vaucluse on 6 June 1988 because of the death of Ray Aston (Liberal).

== Dates ==
Date	Event
23 May 1988	Death of Ray Aston.
31 May 1988	Writ of election issued by the Speaker of the Legislative Assembly.
6 June 1988	Nominations
18 June 1988	Polling day
8 July 1988	Return of writ

== Results ==
1988 Vaucluse by-election Monday 6 June
Party	Candidate	Votes	%	±%
Liberal	Michael Yabsley	Unopposed		
Liberal hold				

== See also ==
- Electoral results for the district of Vaucluse
- List of New South Wales state by-elections
