= Brogden shadow ministry =

The shadow ministry of John Brogden was the opposition led by John Brogden MLA, opposing the Carr government of the Labor Party in the Parliament of New South Wales. The shadow cabinet was made up of members of the Liberal Party and the National Party of Australia in a Coalition agreement.

Brogden led from the majority Coalition partner, the Liberal Party and served as leader of the opposition from 28 March 2002 to 1 September 2005. The minority Coalition partner, the National Party was led by Andrew Stoner MLA for the majority of this period.

== Arrangement ==
Shadow ministerial portfolio	Shadow minister
Leader of the Opposition; Shadow Treasurer; Shadow Minister for Ethnic Affairs; Leader of the Liberal Party	John Brogden MP
Shadow Minister for Natural Resources; Shadow Minister for Regional Development; Leader of the National Party	Andrew Stoner MP
Deputy Leader of the Opposition; Shadow Minister for Health; Shadow Special Minister of State; Deputy Leader of the Liberal Party	Barry O'Farrell MP
Shadow Minister for Roads; Shadow Minister for Housing; Deputy Leader of the Nationals	Don Page MP
Shadow Leader of the House; Shadow Attorney-General; Shadow Special Minister Assisting the Leader on Ethnic Affairs	Andrew Tink MP
Shadow Minister for Commerce; Shadow Minister for Industrial Relations; Shadow Minister for the Central Coast	Chris Hartcher MP
Shadow Minister for Education and Training; Shadow Minister for the Arts	Jillian Skinner MP
Shadow Minister for Gaming and Racing; Shadow Minister for State Development	George Souris MP
Shadow Minister for Tourism; Shadow Minister for Sport and Recreation	Ian Armstrong MP
Shadow Minister for Energy and Utilities; Shadow Minister for Science and Medical Research; Shadow Minister for Aboriginal Affairs	Brad Hazzard MP
Shadow Minister for Police	Peter Debnam MP
Shadow Minister for Justice; Shadow Minister for Emergency Services	Andrew Humpherson MP
Shadow Minister for the Environment	Michael Richardson MP
Shadow Minister for Infrastructure and Planning; Shadow Minister for Reform of Government; Shadow Minister for the Illawarra	Peta Seaton MP
Shadow Minister for Local Government; Shadow Minister for Rural Affairs	Andrew Fraser MP
Shadow Minister for Small Business; Shadow Minister for Fair Trading	Katrina Hodgkinson MP
Shadow Minister for Mineral Resources; Shadow Minister Assisting the Leader of the National Party on Natural Resources; Shadow Minister Assisting the Leader on Ethnic Affairs	Adrian Piccoli MP
Shadow Minister for Community Services; Shadow Minister for Ageing; Shadow Minister for Disability Services; Shadow Minister for Youth; Shadow Minister for Western Sydney; Deputy Leader of the Liberal Party in the Legislative Council	John Ryan MLC

== See also ==
- 2003 New South Wales state election
- Shadow Ministry of Peter Debnam
- Third Carr ministry
- Fourth Carr ministry
- First Iemma ministry
