= John Barraclough =

Australian politician

Lindley John Forbes Barraclough AM (3 September 1926 – 13 December 2005) was an Australian politician, representing the electoral district of Bligh in the New South Wales Legislative Assembly from 1968 to 1981.

New South Wales Legislative Assembly
Preceded by Morton Cohen	Member for Bligh; 1968 – 1981	Succeeded by Fred Miller
Political offices
Preceded by Ian Griffith as Minister for Sport	Minister for Culture, Sport and Recreation; 1975 – 1976	Succeeded by David Arblaster
