= Electoral district of Bligh =

Former state electoral district of New South Wales, Australia

Bligh was an electoral district of the Legislative Assembly in the Australian state of New South Wales. It was created in 1962, partly replacing Electoral district of Paddington-Waverley and was an urban electorate, covering 13.03 km^{2} and taking in the suburbs of Potts Point, Darling Point, Woolloomooloo, Elizabeth Bay, Rushcutters Bay, Edgecliff, Darlinghurst, Paddington, Surry Hills, Redfern, Darlington and part of Chippendale. It was a highly diverse electorate, as it contained both some of the wealthiest suburbs of Sydney, along the edge of the harbour, as well as some of the city's most disadvantaged areas, such as those around Redfern. This made Bligh a marginal seat, although as the wealthier suburbs outnumbered the poorer suburbs, it tended to be Liberal-leaning. Independent Clover Moore defeated the incumbent Liberal member Michael Yabsley in 1988 (Yabsley subsequently reentered Parliament in the Vaucluse by-election later that year) and held the seat until its abolition in 2007, when it was replaced by the electoral district of Sydney.

== Members for Bligh ==
Member	Party	Term
Tom Morey	Labor	1962–1965
Morton Cohen	Liberal	1965–1968
John Barraclough	Liberal	1968–1981
Fred Miller	Labor	1981–1984
Michael Yabsley	Liberal	1984–1988
Clover Moore	Independent	1988–2007

== Election results ==
2003 New South Wales state election: Bligh
Party	Candidate	Votes	%	±%
Independent	Clover Moore	15,330	38.5	+1.2
Labor	Barri Phatarfod	9,071	22.8	−9.1
Liberal	Shayne Mallard	8,496	21.3	−0.1
Greens	Anita Ceravolo	5,634	14.1	+8.2
Unity	Stephen Pong	642	1.6	+0.0
Christian Democrats	Jon Phillips	279	0.7	+0.7
Independent	Malcolm Duncan	268	0.7	+0.0
Independent	Gary Burns	113	0.3	+0.3
Total formal votes		39,833	97.8	+0.1
Informal votes		882	2.2	−0.1
Turnout		40,715	84.3	
Notional two-party-preferred count
Labor	Barri Phatarfod	15,499	60.9	−0.9
Liberal	Shayne Mallard	9,971	39.1	+0.9
Two-candidate-preferred result
Independent	Clover Moore	19,253	64.7	+4.9
Labor	Barri Phatarfod	10,525	35.3	−4.9
Independent hold		Swing	+4.9	
