= 1957 Vaucluse state by-election =

Election result for Vaucluse, New South Wales, Australia

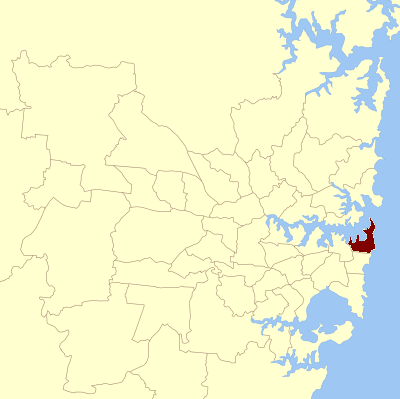
Current location within Sydney

A by-election was held for the New South Wales Legislative Assembly seat of Vaucluse on Saturday, 24 August 1957. It was triggered by the resignation of the former Leader of the New South Wales Liberal Party, Lt.Col. Murray Robson, who retired from parliament.

The seat was subsequently won by Brigadier Geoffrey Cox of the Liberal Party. Vaucluse being a blue-ribbon Liberal seat, the Labor Party chose not to field a candidate. The Liberals witnessed a drop in their primary vote due to several Independent Liberal candidates splitting the strong conservative vote.

== Background ==
The seat of Vaucluse, a traditionally safe Liberal seat, was held since 1936 by Murray Robson, who, after serving with distinction in the Second World War returned and rose to become Leader of the Liberal Party in 1954.

In August 1954, after the long-serving leader, Vernon Treatt, announced his intention to resign, and Deputy-Leader Robert Askin and Pat Morton had tied in a vote to succeed him, Robson was persuaded by Askin to accept the Leadership of the Liberal Party as a compromise candidate. Like other senior members of the party, after having no conservative government since Alexander Mair in 1941, Robson had no experience in government, he had little interest in policy except for Cold War anti-communism, ignored majority views of his party and fellow parliamentary colleagues and further alienated party members by trying to forge a closer alliance with Michael Bruxner's Country Party.

Over a year after he assumed the leadership, at a party meeting on 20 September 1955, senior party member Ken McCaw moved that the leadership be declared vacant, citing that Robson's leadership lacked the qualities necessary for winning the next election. The motion was carried 15 votes to 5. Robson then moved a motion to prevent Pat Morton, who was the only person nominated for leader, from taking the leadership. This was defeated 16 votes to 6 and Morton was elected unopposed as leader, with Robert Askin remaining as Deputy Leader. Robson retorted that there had been a "continuous intrigue" against his leadership. He was returned for the last time at the 3 March 1956 election with 71.41%. Robson, however, did not stay long afterward; on 26 July 1957, he resigned his seat, and returned to his legal practice until he retired.

== Results ==
The Liberal Party retained the seat, albeit on a significantly reduced margin, due in part to several conservative candidates fracturing the Liberal vote. The Liberal candidate, Geoffrey Cox, emerged with 51% after preferences against Independent Liberal Hugh Foster.

1957 Vaucluse by-election Saturday 24 August
Party	Candidate	Votes	%	±%
Liberal	Geoffrey Cox	7,716	44.94	−26.47
Independent Liberal	Hugh Foster	3,802	22.14	
Independent Liberal	Norman Mills	2,616	15.24	
Independent	Alfred Elboz	2,354	13.71	
Independent	Edward Spensley	681	3.97	
Total formal votes		17,169	74.81	
Informal votes		792	4.41	
Turnout		17,961	79.22	
Two-candidate-preferred result
Liberal	Geoffrey Cox	8,854	51.57	
Independent Liberal	Hugh Foster	8,315	48.43	
Liberal hold		Swing	N/A	

== See also ==
- Electoral results for the district of Vaucluse
- List of New South Wales state by-elections
