= Gabrielle Upton =

Australian politician (born 1964)

The Honourable Gabrielle Upton FRSN
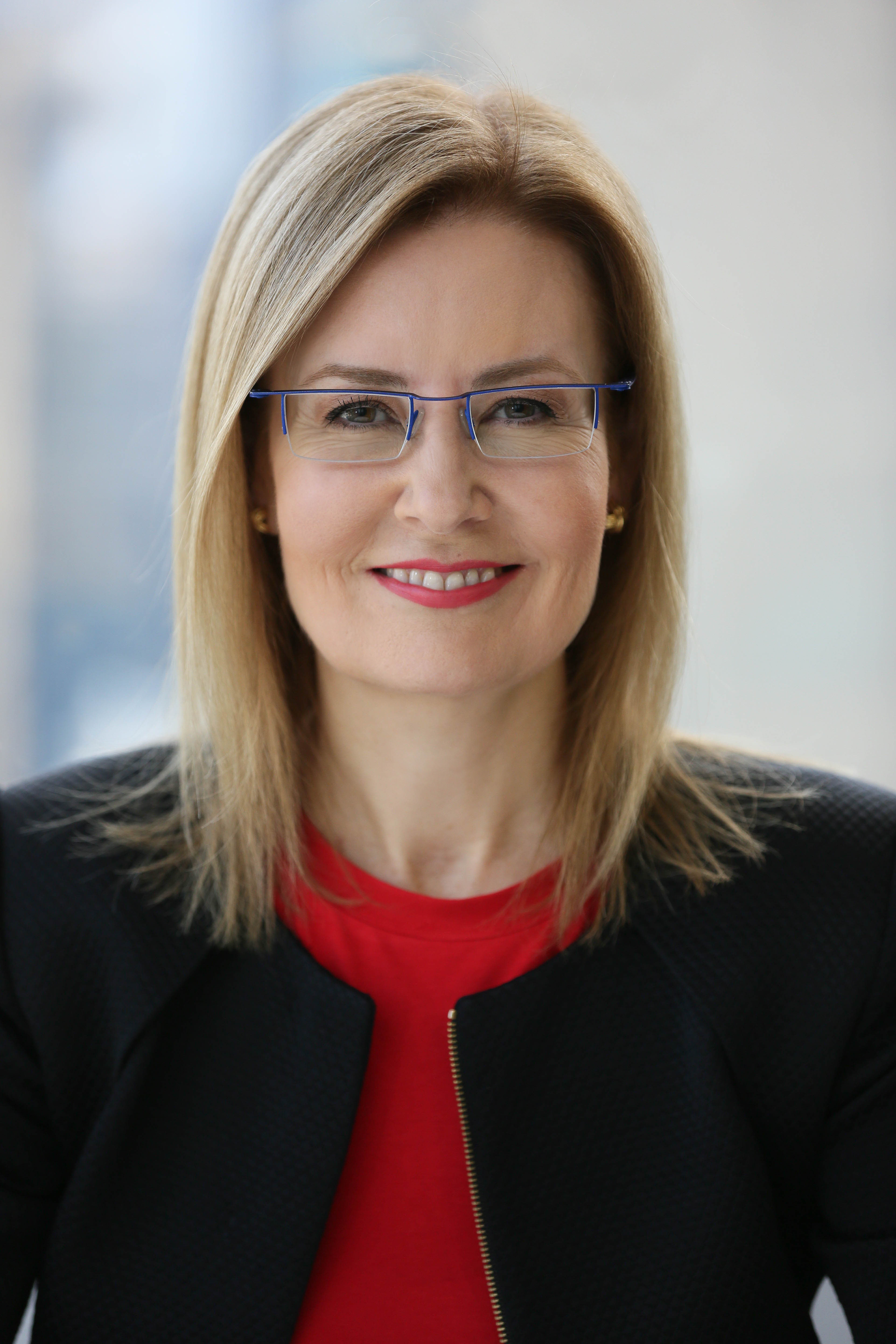
- Gabrielle Upton in 2017

Minister for the Environment
- In office 30 January 2017 – 23 March 2019
- Premier: Gladys Berejiklian
- Preceded by: Mark Speakman
- Succeeded by: Matt Kean

Minister for Local Government
- In office 30 January 2017 – 23 March 2019
- Premier: Gladys Berejiklian
- Preceded by: Paul Toole
- Succeeded by: Shelley Hancock

Minister for Heritage
- In office 30 January 2017 – 23 March 2019
- Premier: Gladys Berejiklian
- Preceded by: Mark Speakman
- Succeeded by: post abolished

Member of the New South Wales Parliament for Vaucluse
- In office 26 March 2011 – 25 March 2023
- Preceded by: Peter Debnam
- Succeeded by: Kellie Sloane

Attorney General of New South Wales
- In office 2 April 2015 – 30 January 2017
- Premier: Mike Baird
- Preceded by: Brad Hazzard
- Succeeded by: Mark Speakman

Minister for Sport and Recreation
- In office 30 August 2013 – 23 April 2014
- Premier: Barry O'Farrell
- Preceded by: Brad Hazzard
- Succeeded by: Stuart Ayres

Minister for Family and Community Services
- In office 23 April 2014 – 2 April 2015
- Premier: Mike Baird
- Preceded by: Pru Goward
- Succeeded by: Brad Hazzard

Personal details
- Born: 16 December 1964 (age 61) Sydney, Australia
- Party: Liberal Party
- Education: University of New South Wales; Stern School of Business
- Profession: Lawyer

Gabrielle Cecelia Upton (born 16 December 1964) is an Australian former politician. She was the member of the New South Wales Legislative Assembly, representing the seat of Vaucluse for the Liberal Party from 2011 until her retirement at the 2023 New South Wales state election.

Upton was the Parliamentary Secretary for the NSW Premier. Upton previously served as the New South Wales Minister for the Environment, the Minister for Local Government, and the Minister for Heritage from January 2017 until March 2019 in the first Berejiklian ministry. She also served as the NSW Attorney General between April 2015 and January 2017 in the second Baird government and was the first woman to be appointed as Attorney General. Upton served as the New South Wales Minister for Family and Community Services in the first Baird government during 2014 and 2015; and the Minister for Sport and Recreation during 2013 and 2014.

== Background and early career ==
Upton was born and raised in the Eastern Suburbs of Sydney where she attended Brigidine College in Randwick and the University of New South Wales, graduating with a Bachelor of Arts and Bachelor of Laws. Upton's career began as a banking and finance lawyer with legal firms Freehill, Hollingdale & Page and DLA Phillips Fox, after being admitted as a solicitor to the Supreme Court of New South Wales and the High Court of Australia in 1988.

Upton moved to live New York City in 1993 where she graduated with a Master of Business Administration (Finance and Management) from the Stern School of Business at New York University, New York. She then worked as a banker with Deutsche Bank and Toronto Dominion Bank in New York financing the energy sector. From 2000 until 2010, Upton was legal counsel at the Australian Institute of Company Directors and a member of CAMAC, the Australian federal government's principal advisory committee on corporations and securities law, between 2006 and 2011. Upton served as Deputy Chancellor at the University of New South Wales from 2006 until 2009, and on the University's Council from 2002 to 2010. From 2005 to 2011, Upton was the Deputy Chair of the Duke of Edinburgh's International Award – Australia and from 2009 to 2011 was Chair of The Friends of The Duke of Edinburgh's Award in Australia; and was also a board member of Neuroscience Research Australia from 2007 to 2011; and a Fellow of the Law Faculty at the University of New South Wales. She is a Fellow of The Australian Institute of Company Directors. Upton is a Fellow of the Royal Society of New South Wales (FRSN).

=== Neuroscience and mental health advocacy ===
Upton has spoken out about the need to raise awareness about mental health and in March 2010 gave a speech to Sydney Rotary where she called for a "full gamut" approach to combating mental illness. This speech noted that every day in Australia six to seven people die by suicide, which was 40 per cent higher than deaths caused on the country's roads – a statistic she described as "completely unacceptable". She has written about the prevalence of mental illness among young Australian lawyers and discussed moves by the legal profession to combat mental illness in the law firm workplace.

== Political career ==
Following the earlier announcement that the Liberal sitting member, Peter Debnam, would not re-contest the next state election, Upton won Liberal Party pre-selection for Vaucluse on 26 September 2010. At the 2011 state election, she was elected with a swing of 9.9 points, winning the seat with 81.4 per cent of the two-party preferred vote. Following the election, she was appointed Parliamentary Secretary for Tertiary Education and Skills. In August 2011, she was appointed Chair of the NSW Parliamentary friends of Israel. On 21 August 2013, Upton was appointed as the Minister for Sport and Recreation.

Due to the resignation of Barry O'Farrell as premier in April 2014, and the subsequent ministerial reshuffle by the new Liberal Leader, Mike Baird, Upton was appointed as the Minister for Family and Community Services and relinquished the portfolio of Sport and Recreation.

Following the 2015 state election, Baird announced that Upton would be Attorney General, becoming the first female Attorney General of New South Wales. As Attorney General, Upton introduced a pilot program to help support child witnesses through the court process, using specialist judges to better deal with child sexual assault trials, and experts called "children's champions".

=== Minister for the Environment, Local Government and Heritage ===
Following the resignation of Mike Baird as Premier, Gladys Berejiklian was elected Liberal leader and sworn in as Premier. Upton became the Minister for the Environment, the Minister for Local Government, and the Minister for Heritage in the Berejiklian ministry.

In October 2017, as heritage minister, Upton refused to list the 1981 Sirius building in The Rocks on the New South Wales State Heritage Register, despite the unanimous recommendation of the Heritage Council of New South Wales. She said: "While the Sirius building is distinctive, in my view, it is not a landmark worthy of state heritage protection." In response, the Chair of the Save Our Sirius Foundation noted that her determination was "an ignorant decision made by an out-of-touch government [...] Upton's only argument and the only thing she cites in her decision is the opinion of a group of private companies the government hired to tell them what they want to hear."

In December 2017, Upton introduced the container deposit scheme called "Return and Earn". It was the single largest initiative undertaken to reduce litter in NSW, and was associated with a 28% drop in litter covered by the container deposit scheme in 2017–18, compared with 2016–17.

In May 2018, together with the Premier, Upton announced the $45 Million Koala Strategy, the largest commitment by any state government to increasing the koala population. The package included additional natural habitat for koalas, funding to tackle diseases, improve research and address roadkill hotspots.

In September 2018, a number of concerns were made public over Upton's ability to perform as a minister. Allegations from former staff and other government sources included her "contempt for bureaucrats", suggestions that she was "paralysed by indecision", and claims that "Departmental briefs sat on her desk for months and months without her even looking at them". The month before, Upton came under fire for allowing a significant delay in determining applications for new items to the New South Wales State Heritage Register, with the exception of Hadley Park in Castlereagh, the original home of the family of conservative radio commentator Ray Hadley, thereby fulfilling her obligations under the Heritage Act 1977 "almost entirely in the breach".

Attention also focused on the "toxic environment" of her 12-staff office, with 16 staff members having left in the 18-month period up to September 2018, and one former staffer receiving compensation for severe stress. Separate sources, including fellow government ministers, labelled her as "the weakest performer in the cabinet" and that "her inaction presiding over her former NSW environment portfolio was almost at the level of performance art".

Upton was not reappointed to the ministry following the 2019 state election.

== Later political career ==
In October 2019, as Parliamentary Secretary to the Premier Upton was given the responsibility for research and development investment. To guide the development of an Action Plan she appointed an Advisory Council chaired by David Gonski Upton has also written on the potential for NSW to be the home of technological innovation.

On 25 January 2021, the NSW Premier Gladys Berejiklian, together with Upton, launched the "Turning ideas into Jobs" Accelerating research and development in NSW Action Plan. $26 million was announced as a kick-off funding to support a Small Business Innovation Research program and matchmaking platform.

== See also ==
- First Baird ministry
- Second Baird ministry
- Berejiklian ministry

New South Wales Legislative Assembly
Preceded by Peter Debnam	Member for Vaucluse; 2011–2023	Succeeded by Kellie Sloane
Political offices
Preceded by Mark Speakman	Minister for the Environment; 2017–2019	Succeeded by Matt Kean as Minister for Energy and Environment
Preceded by Paul Toole	Minister for Local Government; 2017–2019	Succeeded by Shelley Hancock
Preceded by Mark Speakman	Minister for Heritage; 2017–2019	Succeeded by portfolio abolished
Preceded by Graham Annesley	Minister for Sport and Recreation; 2013–2014	Succeeded by Stuart Ayres
Preceded by Pru Goward	Minister for Family and Community Services; 2014–2015	Succeeded by Brad Hazzard
Preceded by Brad Hazzard	Attorney General of New South Wales; 2015–2017	Succeeded by Mark Speakman
