= Fred Miller (Australian politician) =

Australian politician

Personal details
- Born: 4 January 1926 Surry Hills, New South Wales
- Died: 1 May 1992 (aged 66) Sydney
- Party: Labor Party

Frederick Joseph Miller (4 January 1926 – 1 May 1992) was an Australian politician and member of the New South Wales Legislative Assembly from 1981 until 1984. He was a member of the Labor Party (ALP).

Miller was born in Surry Hills, in inner Sydney. He was educated at Sydney Technical College and worked as a plumber employed by South Sydney Council and the New South Wales Department of Health. He was a member of the Sydney City Council from 1969 until 1974. Miller was elected to the New South Wales Parliament for the seat of Bligh at the 1981 state election when he defeated the sitting member, John Barraclough, during a landslide win for the Wran Labor Government. He was defeated at the subsequent election in 1984. He did not hold ministerial or party office.

New South Wales Legislative Assembly
Preceded by John Barraclough	Member for Bligh; 1981 – 1984	Succeeded by Michael Yabsley
