= Debnam shadow ministry =

The shadow ministry of Peter Debnam was the opposition led by Peter Debnam MLA, opposing the Iemma government of the Labor Party in the Parliament of New South Wales. The shadow cabinet was made up of members of the Liberal Party and the National Party of Australia in a Coalition agreement.

Debnam led from the majority Coalition partner, the Liberal Party and served as leader of the opposition from 1 September 2005 until the 2007 state election. The minority Coalition partner, the National Party was led by Andrew Stoner MLA during this period. The leader of the opposition in the Legislative Council was Mike Gallacher MLC from the Liberal Party and the deputy leader of the Legislative Council was Duncan Gay MLC from the National Party.

== Arrangement ==
=== Shadow ministers from the Legislative Assembly ===
Shadow ministerial portfolio	Shadow minister
Leader of the Opposition; Shadow Treasurer; Shadow Minister for Western Sydney; Shadow Minister for Citizenship; Leader of the Liberal Party	Peter Debnam
Shadow Minister for Roads; Shadow Minister for Utilities; Leader of the National Party	Andrew Stoner
Deputy Leader of the Opposition; Shadow Minister for Transport; Shadow Minister for Ports and Waterways; Deputy Leader of the Liberal Party	Barry O'Farrell
Shadow Minister for Skills Development and Training; Shadow Minister for State Development Shadow Minister for Regional Development; Shadow Minister for North Coast; Deputy Leader of the Nationals	Don Page
Shadow Leader of the House; Shadow Attorney-General; Shadow Special Minister of State	Andrew Tink
Shadow Minister for Planning; Shadow Minister for Industrial Relations; Shadow Minister for the Central Coast	Chris Hartcher
Shadow Minister for Health; Shadow Minister for the Arts	Jillian Skinner
Shadow Minister for Gaming and Racing; Shadow Minister for Sport and Recreation	George Souris
Shadow Minister for Local Government; Shadow Minister for Fair Trading	John Turner
Shadow Minister for Education and Training; Shadow Minister for Aboriginal Affairs	Brad Hazzard
Shadow Minister for Reform of Government; Assistant Shadow Treasurer; Shadow Minister for the Illawarra	Peta Seaton
Shadow Minister for Community Services; Shadow Minister for Emergency Services; Shadow Minister for Justice	Andrew Humpherson
Shadow Minister for the Environment	Michael Richardson
Shadow Minister for Housing; Shadow Minister for Small Business	Andrew Fraser
Shadow Minister for Tourism; Shadow Minister for Rural Affairs	Katrina Hodgkinson
Shadow Minister for Lands and Natural Resources	Adrian Piccoli
Shadow Minister for Mental Health; Shadow Minister for Cancer and Medical Research; Shadow Minister for Youth Affairs; Shadow Minister Assisting the Leader on Citizenship	Gladys Berejiklian

=== Shadow ministers from the Legislative Council ===
Shadow ministerial portfolio	Shadow minister
Leader of the Opposition in the Legislative Council; Shadow Minister for Police and the Hunter	Mike Gallacher
Deputy Leader of the Opposition in the Legislative Council; Shadow Minister for Primary Industries; Shadow Minister for Mineral Resources	Duncan Gay
Shadow Minister for Commerce; Shadow Minister for Ageing; Shadow Minister for Disability Services; Deputy Leader of the Liberal Party in the Legislative Council	John Ryan
Shadow Minister for Juvenile Justice; Shadow Minister for Women	Catherine Cusack
Shadow Minister for Finance; Shadow Minister for Infrastructure	Greg Pearce

== See also ==
- 2007 New South Wales state election
- Resignation of John Brogden
- Shadow ministry of Barry O'Farrell
- Iemma ministry (2005–07)
- Iemma ministry (2007–08)
