= Geoffrey Cox (Australian politician) =

Australian politician (1914–1964)

Brigadier Geoffrey Souter Cox DSO, MC, ED

Member of the New South Wales Legislative Assembly for Vaucluse
- In office 24 August 1957 – 16 November 1964
- Preceded by: Murray Robson
- Succeeded by: Keith Doyle

Personal details
- Born: 4 December 1914 Bondi, New South Wales, Australia
- Died: 16 November 1964 (aged 49) Sydney, New South Wales, Australia
- Party: Liberal Party

Military service
- Allegiance: Australia
- Branch/service: Citizen Military Forces; Second Australian Imperial Force
- Years of service: 1936–1962
- Rank: Brigadier
- Commands: 8th Brigade (1952–56); St George Regiment (1948–52); 2/4th Battalion (1945)
- Battles/wars: Second World War; Western Desert campaign; Battle of Bardia; Battle of Greece; Syria–Lebanon campaign; New Guinea campaign; Kokoda Track campaign; Aitape–Wewak campaign
- Awards: Distinguished Service Order; Military Cross; Efficiency Decoration

Brigadier Geoffrey Souter Cox, DSO, MC, ED (4 December 1914 – 16 November 1964) was an Australian soldier and politician. A decorated officer during the Second World War, he later entered politics, serving as a Liberal Party member of the New South Wales Legislative Assembly from 1957 to 1964, representing the electorate of Vaucluse.

== Biography ==
Cox was born in Bondi, and educated at Cleveland Street High School and Sydney Grammar School. He worked as an insurance clerk before the Second World War, but was active in the Citizen Military Forces from 1936. Rising to the rank of sergeant by 1939, Cox was commissioned as a lieutenant later that year and enlisted in the Second Australian Imperial Force for active service in the Second World War. He was a platoon commander in the Middle East and Greece in the early stages of the war, where he met his later wife, whom he married during a brief return to Australia in 1942. He was subsequently deployed to New Guinea, where he was awarded the Military Cross for his courage. Cox was later promoted to major and lieutenant colonel, and was awarded the Distinguished Service Order for his role in administering two successful operations in 1945, during the closing stages of the war. Cox returned to Bondi after the war, working as a real-estate agent in the family business, and remaining active in the Citizen Military Forces, where he rose to the rank of brigadier.

Cox was elected to the Legislative Assembly for the state seat of Vaucluse at a 1957 by-election following the retirement of Liberal leader Murray Robson. He served on the Liberal executive from 1963 to 1964, but did not hold parliamentary or ministerial office. Cox killed himself in his office at Parliament House on 16 November 1964, and was buried in a churchyard at Rose Bay.

New South Wales Legislative Assembly
Preceded by Murray Robson	Member for Vaucluse; 1957–1964	Succeeded by Keith Doyle
