= Keith Doyle (politician) =

Australian politician

Keith Ralph Doyle OAM (10 December 1924 – 12 October 2017) was an Australian politician. He was a Liberal Party member of the New South Wales Legislative Assembly from 1965 to 1978, representing the electorate of Vaucluse.

Doyle was born in Sydney, and was educated at Sydney Church of England Grammar School and the University of Sydney. He served in the Royal Australian Air Force during World War II as a flying officer and navigator. An insurance broker by trade, he was managing director of Banks Brothers and Metcalf Insurance Brokers and the Cooma Development Company, and operated commercial laundries at Cooma, Bega and Ulladulla. He was also involved in charitable causes, serving as a director of the New South Wales Society for Crippled Children from 1952 to 1958. An active member of the Liberal Party, he served on its state executive and as president of his local branch during the 1950s.

Doyle entered state politics at the 1965 state election, filling a vacancy caused by the death of his predecessor, Geoffrey Cox, late in the previous term. Vaucluse was a safe seat for the Liberal Party, and he was re-elected with little difficulty at four subsequent elections. A backbencher throughout his political career, Doyle's most prominent moment occurred when he was one of three backbenchers who organised support for Eric Willis' 1976 ouster of Tom Lewis as Premier. He retired at the 1978 state election; his retirement paved the way for Rosemary Foot, later the first female leader of the Liberal Party, to enter politics.

Doyle continued his involvement in charitable and community organisations during and after his political career. While in office, he served as a fellow of the University of Sydney from 1965 to 1976 and as president of the Vaucluse House Trust from 1972 to 1975. After his retirement, he was the inaugural president of the New South Wales Kiwi Fruit Growers Association from 1982 to 1987, president of the Taree Legacy Club from 1987 to 1988, and president of the Taree Police Citizens Youth Club from 1991 to 1992. He was awarded the Order of Australia Medal in 1981. He died in October 2017 at the age of 92.

New South Wales Legislative Assembly
Preceded by Geoffrey Cox	Member for Vaucluse; 1965 – 1978	Succeeded by Rosemary Foot
