= Peter Debnam =

Australian former politician (born 1954)

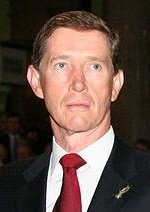
- Debnam at the ANZAC dawn service, Sydney, 25 April 2006

Leader of the Opposition of New South Wales Elections: 2007
- In office 1 September 2005 – 2 April 2007
- Monarch: Elizabeth II
- Premier: Morris Iemma
- Deputy: Barry O'Farrell
- Preceded by: John Brogden
- Succeeded by: Barry O'Farrell

Member of the New South Wales Parliament for Vaucluse
- In office 9 April 1994 – 4 March 2011
- Preceded by: Michael Yabsley
- Succeeded by: Gabrielle Upton

Personal details
- Born: 21 April 1954 (age 72) Sydney, New South Wales, Australia
- Party: Liberal Party
- Spouse: Deborah Debnam
- Website: Personal site

Military service
- Allegiance: Australia
- Branch/service: Royal Australian Navy
- Years of service: 1972 – 1980
- Rank: Lieutenant
- Unit: HMAS Melbourne; HMAS Torrens; HMAS Vampire; HMAS Anzac; HMAS Attack; HMAS Barricade

Peter John Debnam (born 21 April 1954), is a retired Australian former politician and naval officer who served as leader of the Liberal Party and Leader of the Opposition in New South Wales between 2005 and 2007. He led the Liberal-National Coalition and the Debnam-Stoner shadow ministry to the 2007 state election, losing to the Labor government led by Premier Morris Iemma.

Debnam was a member of the New South Wales Legislative Assembly representing Vaucluse between 1994 and 2011. He variously held the shadow ministries of Police, Western Sydney, Redfern/Waterloo, Citizenship, Infrastructure and Energy whilst the Liberal-National Coalition was in opposition.

== Early life and career ==
Debnam's early years of schooling were at Frenchs Forest Public School and The Forest High School. Debnam was educated at the Royal Australian Naval College, where he graduated in 1974. He served in the Royal Australian Navy from 1972 to 1980. During his Naval career, Debnam served on many ships including the aircraft carrier HMAS Melbourne, destroyer escort HMAS Torrens, destroyers HMAS Vampire and HMAS Anzac and patrol boats HMAS Attack and HMAS Barricade. After leaving the navy, Debnam studied at the Macquarie Graduate School of Management, where he gained an MBA. He held positions at Dalgety Farmers Limited, Hawker de Havilland and Australian Aircraft Consortium before entering politics.

== Political career ==
In 1994, Debnam was elected to the New South Wales Legislative Assembly, winning a by-election for the safe Liberal seat of Vaucluse. The following year the Liberal government was defeated by Labor under Bob Carr. Between 1997 and 2005 Debnam was successively Shadow Minister for Housing and for Planning and Urban Affairs, Shadow Treasurer, Shadow Minister for Transport, Shadow Minister for Police and Shadow Minister for Transport Services.

Following John Brogden's sudden resignation as Liberal Leader in August 2005, the Deputy Leader, Barry O'Farrell, was initially the favourite to become leader, but Debnam steadily gained ground as he lobbied Liberal MPs, and on 31 August O'Farrell withdrew from the contest.

=== Allegations against Attorney-General ===
On 16 November 2006, Debnam suggested under Parliamentary Privilege that NSW Attorney-General Bob Debus was under investigation by the Police Integrity Commission. In response, the Government released a police report stating that a minister had been the subject of complaints (not an investigation), and that they were dismissed in 2003 as spurious and groundless. The report did not name the minister concerned as it was, deemed to be 'not in the public interest'. When Mr Debnam declined to provide evidence to support his claims, he was censured by Parliament for misleading the House.

It was subsequently reported that Debnam's source for the accusation was a convicted child sex offender and bank robber with a history of making unsubstantiated allegations. Opinion poll support for the Opposition leader declined markedly in the wake of the allegations, which also distracted attention from a campaign against the Government over the sacking of Ministers Milton Orkopoulos and Carl Scully.

=== 2007 election ===
Peter Debnam led the Liberal/National coalition to defeat in the 2007 state election. The Coalition gained a total of four seats from Labor and independents—too few to significantly reduce Labor's majority. Following the election, his deputy, O'Farrell, announced he would challenge Debnam for the Liberal leadership. When it was apparent that Debnam did not have enough support to keep his post, he withdrew from the contest on 2 April 2007, effectively handing the leadership to O'Farrell. On 11 April 2007 O'Farrell appointed Debnam as opposition infrastructure and energy spokesman. He resigned in May 2008 because of his party's decision to support the Labor Government's plan to privatise the electricity system.

He retired from Parliament prior to the 2011 state election and was succeeded by Gabrielle Upton as the member for Vaucluse.

== Bibliography ==
- Marr, David (2 September 2006). "Interview with Peter Debnam". "Debnam's not drowning, he's waving", The Sydney Morning Herald. p. 25.

New South Wales Legislative Assembly
Preceded by Michael Yabsley	Member for Vaucluse; 1994 – 2011	Succeeded by Gabrielle Upton
Political offices
Preceded by John Brogden	Leader of the Opposition of New South Wales; 2005 – 2007	Succeeded by Barry O'Farrell
Party political offices
Preceded by John Brogden	Leader of the New South Wales Liberal Party; 2005 – 2007	Succeeded by Barry O'Farrell
