= Murray Robson =

Australian politician

Lieutenant Colonel Murray Robson CBE, DSO

18th Leader of the Opposition of New South Wales
- In office 17 August 1954 – 20 September 1955
- Monarch: Elizabeth II
- Deputy: Robert Askin
- Preceded by: Vernon Treatt
- Succeeded by: Pat Morton

Member of the New South Wales Parliament for Vaucluse
- In office 29 August 1936 – 26 July 1957
- Preceded by: William Foster
- Succeeded by: Geoffrey Cox

Personal details
- Born: 7 March 1906 Ashfield, New South Wales, Australia
- Died: 26 August 1974 (aged 68) Rose Bay, New South Wales
- Spouse(s): Lesley Martin; Priscilla Gee
- Relations: William Robson (father); William Robson (grandfather)
- Education: Newington College; University of Sydney
- Occupation: Politician and Lawyer

Military service
- Allegiance: Australia
- Branch/service: Australian Army
- Years of service: 1939–1945
- Rank: Lieutenant Colonel
- Unit: Citizen Military Forces; 2/3rd Field Regiment, RAA; 2/31st Battalion, AIF
- Battles/wars: Second World War; Syria-Lebanon Campaign; North African Campaign; New Guinea campaign; Borneo campaign
- Awards: Commander of the Order of the British Empire; Distinguished Service Order; Mentioned in Despatches (3)

Lieutenant Colonel Ewan Murray Robson CBE, DSO (7 March 1906 – 26 August 1974) was an Australian lawyer, soldier and a member of the New South Wales Parliament for over twenty years. Known for most of his life as Murray Robson, he was born in Sydney and educated at Newington College and the University of Sydney, where he gained degrees in arts and law. After working several years as a solicitor, Robson stood for, and was elected to, parliament on 29 August 1936 at a by-election for the seat of Vaucluse. He served many years on the backbenches, he enlisted in World War II and served with distinction during the war, gaining promotion to lieutenant colonel and receiving the Distinguished Service Order for his service.

Returning to politics, he had missed the foundation of the Liberal Party in 1945. When long-time Leader Vernon Treatt resigned the leadership in 1954 and contests between Deputy Leader Robert Askin and Pat Morton became deadlocked he was asked to stand and was consequently elected as party leader and Leader of the Opposition. He served little more than a year before he was deposed by Pat Morton. In 1957 he retired from politics and returned to his legal career before retiring. He died of a heart attack in August 1974.

== Early life ==
Murray Robson was born in Ashfield, New South Wales on 7 March 1906, the second son of long-serving NSW politician William Elliott Veitch Robson and Mabel Jackson Wise. His grandfather, William Robson, was also a Member of the NSW Legislative Council from 1900 to 1920. Being educated at Newington College from 1918 to 1923, Robson graduated with a Bachelor of Arts (1927) and a Bachelor of Law (1930) at the University of Sydney while a resident of St. Paul's College.

Robson was admitted as a solicitor on 4 June 1930 and practised with his father at Robson & Cowlishaw. He married Lesley Alison Martin in 1931 at St Stephen's Presbyterian Church, Sydney and had two sons. When sitting United Australia Party (UAP) MP William Foster died in office, Robson stood as an Independent UAP candidate at the resulting by-election in Foster's vacated Legislative Assembly seat of Vaucluse. At the by-election on 29 August 1936, he emerged successful, with 62.63% of the vote, becoming the third generation of his family to serve in the NSW Parliament.

Soon after his election Robson joined the UAP but soon joined a group of government backbenchers who were unhappy with the Bertram Stevens government's economic management and the party's control over preselection, becoming prominent in the struggle that led to the resignation of the Premier Stevens and his replacement by Alexander Mair in August 1939. At the 4 March 1938 election, Robson retained his seat uncontested.

== Military career ==
When the Second World War broke out, Robson initially enlisted as a lieutenant in the Militia from 29 September 1939. On 25 December, Robson was granted a leave of absence from the NSW Parliament, with his father dealing with his affairs, and enlisted in the Second Australian Imperial Force on 29 December. Embarking for Scotland with the 2nd/5th Field Regiment, Royal Australian Artillery, in May 1940, he disembarked at Gourock, Scotland on 18 June 1940. Transferring to the 2/31st Battalion in the 7th Division, and was trained in the AIF School. On 3 March 1941, he left Britain, arriving in the Middle East on 9 March. On 9 May 1941, he was appointed to captain.

In June 1941 Captain Robson received a shrapnel wound to the foot while fighting in Syria. Attached to the Middle East Tactical School, he rejoined his unit in February 1942 and served with distinction in North Africa, being promoted to major on 8 October 1942. On 3 December 1942, Robson departed North Africa with his unit, disembarking at Brisbane, Queensland, on 8 January 1943. On 11 June 1943, he was promoted to lieutenant colonel and given command of the 2/31st Battalion.

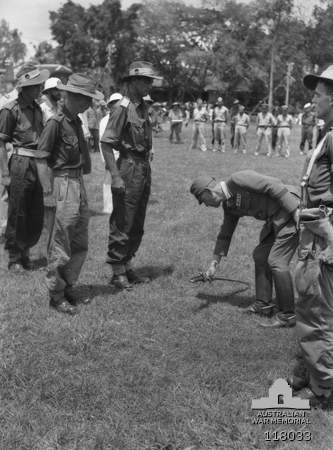
Lt.Col. Robson receiving the surrender from Major General Uno in Bandjermasin on 17 September 1945.

In August 1943 Robson sailed with his unit to New Guinea where he suffered bouts of malaria. He was Mentioned in Despatches three times. On 6 March 1945 he was awarded the Distinguished Service Order, on a recommendation by his Commanding officer, Major General George Alan Vasey.

=== DSO citation ===
Government House, Canberra. 27th April, 1944.

The KING has been graciously pleased to approve that the following be Mentioned in recognition of gallant and distinguished services in the South-West Pacific: — Lt.Col. E. M. Robson (NX 349).

For courage, coolness, determination and resourceful leadership in the field. Throughout the New Guinea Campaign Lieut-Col Robson was outstanding in his leadership. His efficient handling of his command down Markham Valley to Lae, when his battalion carried out a major outflanking movement, was largely responsible for the rapid overpowering and destruction of the enemy. During the four months of the campaign, he continually made his early recess, and was constantly among his most forward troops. By his actions he inspired complete confidence in all under his command.

— (Sgd) G.A.Vasey, Maj-Gen. GOC 7 Aust. Div. 27 Feb. 1944

In July 1945 he led his unit in the invasion of Balikpapan, Borneo, and in September accepted the surrender of Japanese forces under Major General Michio Uno at Bandjermasin in the Dutch East Indies. Relinquishing command, he returned to Sydney and was placed on the Reserve of Officers in November before being discharged on 21 November 1945.

== Post-war career ==
Upon demobilisation, Robson returned to his political career. His long absence during his war service had put pressure on his marriage and ended when his wife divorced him in 1947. He remarried soon after to Naomi Priscilla Gee at St Peter's Anglican Church, Watsons Bay on 9 December 1950. During his military service he had missed the political upheavals of the collapse of the UAP and the foundation of the Liberal Party in 1945. He retained his seat at the election on 3 May 1947, assisted by a young Robert Askin, a former Sergeant in his battalion. Robson retained his seat again with 67.39%. He later supported Askin in his bid to enter the Parliament in 1950. Robson was re-elected with 68.37%. He was returned again at the 14 February 1953 election unopposed.

In August 1954, after the long-serving leader, Vernon Treatt, announced his intention to resign, and now-Deputy-Leader Askin and Pat Morton had tied in a vote to succeed him, Robson was persuaded by Askin to accept the Leadership of the Liberal Party as a compromise candidate. Like other senior members of the party, after having no conservative government since Alexander Mair in 1941, Robson had no experience in government, he had little interest in policy except for Cold War anti-communism, ignored majority views of his party and fellow parliamentary colleagues and further alienated party members by trying to forge a closer alliance with Michael Bruxner's Country Party.

Over a year after he assumed the leadership, at a party meeting on 20 September 1955, senior party member Ken McCaw moved that the leadership be declared vacant, citing that Robson's leadership lacked the qualities necessary for winning the next election. The motion was carried 15 votes to 5. Robson then moved a motion to prevent Pat Morton, who was the only person nominated for leader, from taking the leadership. This was defeated 16 votes to 6 and Morton was elected unopposed as leader, with Robert Askin remaining as Deputy Leader. Robson retorted that there had been a "continuous intrigue" against his leadership. He was returned for the last time at the 3 March 1956 election with 71.41%. Robson, however, did not stay long afterward; on 26 July 1957, he resigned his seat, and returned to his legal practice until he retired.

== Later life ==
At the resulting by-election on 24 August 1957, Vaucluse was held by the Liberals candidate, Geoffrey Cox, despite a significant reduction in the Liberal margin. In retirement he belonged to the Royal Sydney Golf Club, the Rose Bay Bowling Club and The University Club. He was appointed a Commander of the Order of the British Empire in the 1966 New Year Honours, On 26 August 1974, Robson died of a heart attack at his Rose Bay home, survived by his second wife and both his sons.

New South Wales Legislative Assembly
Preceded by William Foster	Member for Vaucluse; 1936–1957	Succeeded by Geoffrey Cox
Political offices
Preceded by Vernon Treatt	Leader of the Opposition of New South Wales; 1954–1955	Succeeded by Pat Morton
Party political offices
Preceded by Vernon Treatt	Leader of the New South Wales Liberal Party; 1954–1955	Succeeded by Pat Morton
