= William Yabsley =

Australian mixed farmer and shipbuilder

William Yabsley (2 February 1812 – 21 January 1880) was an Australian mixed farmer, shipbuilder and shipowner. Yabsley was born in Plympton, now a suburb of Plymouth, Devon, England, on 2 February 1812 to John Yabsley and his wife Agnes née Elliot.

In 1833, he became an apprentice shipwright in Devonport at the Royal Dockyard. In February 1837, he entered the navy as a carpenters mate and was assigned to HMS Beagle on its voyage to Australia, starting on 4 July 1837, under the command of Captain John Wickham. The vessel arrived Sydney in August 1838 where Yabsley deserted the ship.

His wife joined him in 1840. About that year, he began to build his first ship, the Providence.

He died by drowning falling overboard into the Richmond River between Lismore and Coraki helping to drive a boat during a flood at sea.
