= Robert Webster (politician) =

Australian politician

The Honourable Robert Webster AM

Member of Parliament for Goulburn
- In office 24 March 1984 – 25 March 1995

Personal details
- Born: 16 September 1951 Sydney
- Party: National Party (until 1996); Liberal Party (from 1996)
- Spouses: Elizabeth née Love (m. 1974; div. 1998) Caro née Black (m. 1999)
- Relations: Son of Leila Elizabeth and Eccleston Bales Webster
- Children: 2 sons 2 daughters
- Education: Wyvern House; Newington College
- Profession: Director of korn ferry international

Robert James Webster (born 16 September 1951) is an Australian company director and grazier and a former New South Wales parliamentarian.

== Early life ==
Webster was born in Sydney and attended Newington College (1963–1969), commencing as a preparatory school student in Wyvern House. From 1970 until his election to State parliament he was a grazier at Salisbury Downs, a property near Bigga.

== Parliamentary career ==
Webster represented Goulburn for the National Party in the NSW Legislative Assembly from March 1984 until May 1991 when he was elected as a member of the Legislative Council where he served until retiring from politics in 1995. During his parliamentary career he served as Minister for Administrative Services and Assistant Minister for Transport, Minister for Family and Community Services and Minister for Administrative Services, Minister for Planning, Minister for Energy, Minister for State Development and Minister for Tourism, and finally as Minister for Planning and Minister for Housing. While in Parliament, Webster was a member of the National Party but since 1996 has been a member of the Liberal Party.

== Business career ==
He is a former executive director of the International Banks and Securities Association of Australia and is now a Director of Korn Ferry International and chair of the board at Endeavour Energy.

== Community service ==
Between 1997 and 2004 he served a Chairman of the National Science & Technology Centre, Questacon. He is currently chairman of ANZ Stadium's advisory board. He is a former member of Newington College Council.

== Honours and recognition ==
Webster was appointed a Member of the Order of Australia in the 2024 King's Birthday Honours for "significant service to the people and Parliament of New South Wales, and to business".

New South Wales Legislative Assembly
Preceded by Ron Brewer	Member for Goulburn; 1984 – 1991	Succeeded by Seat abolished
