= Rosemary Foot (politician) =

Australian politician

Rosemary Irene Foot, AO (born 2 April 1936) is an Australian former politician. She was a Liberal member of the New South Wales Legislative Assembly from 1978 to 1986.

First elected to state parliament as member for Vaucluse at the 1978 state election, Foot went on to serve as Deputy Opposition Leader from 1983 until her retirement in 1986.

Foot was born in Cowra, New South Wales. She is the great-granddaughter of Sir John See, a former New South Wales Premier who successfully introduced the Women's Franchise Act in 1902.

New South Wales Legislative Assembly
Preceded by Keith Doyle	Member for Vaucluse; 1978 – 1986	Succeeded by Ray Aston
Party political offices
Preceded by Kevin Rozzoli	Deputy Leader of the New South Wales Liberal Party; 1983 – 1986	Succeeded by Peter Collins
