= Michael Yabsley =

Australian politician

Member of the New South Wales Parliament for Bligh
- In office 1984–1988
- Preceded by: Fred Miller
- Succeeded by: Clover Moore

Member of the New South Wales Parliament for Vaucluse
- In office 1988–1994
- Preceded by: Ray Aston
- Succeeded by: Peter Debnam

Minister for Corrective Services
- In office 8 June 1988 – 6 June 1991
- Premier: Nick Greiner
- Preceded by: John Fahey
- Succeeded by: Terry Griffiths

Minister for State Development
- In office 6 June 1991 – 24 June 1992
- Premier: Nick Greiner
- Preceded by: John Hannaford
- Succeeded by: Robert Webster

Minister for Tourism
- In office 6 June 1991 – 24 June 1992
- Premier: Nick Greiner
- Preceded by: Garry West
- Succeeded by: Robert Webster

Personal details
- Born: Michael Robert Yabsley; 30 June 1956 (age 69) Lismore, New South Wales
- Party: Liberals
- Spouse: Susie Yabsley (m. 1983; dis. 2019)
- Children: 2
- Education: St John’s College, Woodlawn
- Alma mater: Australian National University
- Occupation: Politician; Government affairs advisor
- Boards: National Art School Foundation

Michael Robert Yabsley (born 30 June 1956) is an Australian former politician. He was a Liberal member of the New South Wales Legislative Assembly, representing the electorates of Bligh from 1984 to 1988 and Vaucluse from 1988 to 1994.

== Early life ==
Yabsley was born in Lismore. His father, Bob Yabsley, was a prominent pastoral farmer and a decedent of settler William Yabsley. Yabsley attended private schools in Lismore, and was a prefect at St John's College, Woodlawn. After graduating from school he spent a year in South Africa on an exchange with Rotary International. He then attended the Australian National University (ANU), where he received a Bachelor of Arts with a double major in political science. In 1977, Yabsley wrote an article for the ANU student newspaper Woroni denying that South Africa still practised apartheid, and saying "even the most iniquitous aspects of apartheid" was preferable to the country being ruled by Africans. After university he went on to work as a public relations manager for the Livestock and Grain Producers Association.

== Political career ==
At 24 Yabsley was a Liberal party candidate at the 1980 federal election for the seat of Fraser in the Australian Capital Territory, though was defeated by Ken Fry. In 1984, Yabsley defeated Labor MP Fred Miller to win the NSW state seat of Bligh in Sydney for the Liberal Party. However, in 1988 he was defeated by Independent candidate Clover Moore. The death of Ray Aston, the Liberal member for Vaucluse, allowed Yabsley to re-enter parliament; he was elected unopposed in the by-election. He was immediately appointed as Minister for Corrective Services.

Yabsley took an extremely punitive approach to prison, saying he wanted to be remembered as "someone who has put the value back in punishment". He led a campaign to make conditions in custody harsher, which included banning prisoners from having personal belongings including photos of their children, wedding rings, religious items, educational materials and hats. Yabsley decreased the amount of visits a prisoner could receive from one a week to one a month, and severely cut funding for prison education and rehabilitation programs, as well as funding to a halfway house. When prison chaplains at Bathurst Correctional Centre complained to the media about conditions caused by Yabsley's policies, he shut down church services at the prison, and forbid chaplains from making any statements without his prior approval. The NSW Assistant Ombudsman determined that Yabsley's decision to ban two magazines produced in prison was illegal. In 1988, The Bulletin included Yabsley on their list of the "100 most appalling people in Australia", noting that he had supported apartheid as a student and opining that he was "now borrowing [apartheid's] law enforcement and discipline methods for the NSW prison system".

Yabsley expressed outrage that an anti-apartheid activist, who was imprisoned for one-month for altering a piece of graffiti, was released after one week in prison. He subsequently introduced the 1989 truth in sentencing legislation, which ended the early release of prisoners for good behaviour and resulted in severe overcrowding; the removal of incentive to behave also caused an increase in assaults, decreases in compliance with work and education, and deteriorating rapport between prisoners and officers. According to David Grant, a former deputy chairman of prisons in NSW, Yabsley's policies were not in response to the crime rate, which evidence showed was decreasing, but simply due to his personal preference of a more punitive regime and a desire to keep people in prison longer.

Yabsley's policies yielded no positive effects, though did incur high costs. His decision to remove private property in prison cells was made against the advice of the Director of Prison Operations, who warned it would unite prisoners in violent demonstrations. Yabsley ignored this advice, and the subsequent riots against his policy, which were the first riots in NSW prisons since the 1970s, caused $6 million in damages and $4 million in lost contracts. As a result of his policies, NSW prisons experienced record levels of assaults, deaths and expenditure, and increased self-harm among prisoners and resignations among staff. Staff morale deteriorated, and the Probation and Parole Officers Association accused Yabsley of putting the safety of prison officers at risk. Prior to the 1988 election, in accordance with their demands, Yabsley promised the prison officer's union he would introduce compulsory testing of prisoners for HIV, and the segregation of prisoners carrying the virus. The fact the election promises were still not implemented by 1990 caused "irreconcilable differences" between him and the union, who held a vote of no confidence in him later that year.

The coalition retained power at the 1991 New South Wales state election, though Yabsley was removed from his position as Minister for Corrective Services; according to Police Studies, the government deliberately transferred him to a portfolio where "he could do less harm". Following his removal, the more extreme policies he initiated in prisons were relaxed, and the next decade saw "cautious penal politics in which the major political imperative [was] to keep prisons off the front pages and keep quiet about any reforms."

After being removed from his position as Minister of Corrections, Yabsley was made the Minister for State Development and Minister for Tourism. He resigned from the ministry in 1992, "in protest" of the circumstances that brought about the resignation of Premier Nick Greiner and Environment Minister Tim Moore. Greiner resigned after three independents who held the balance of power, including Clover Moore who had defeated Yabsley in 1988, told Greiner that unless he resigned they would withdraw their support from the government and support a no-confidence motion. Yabsley resigned from parliament in 1994.

== Personal life ==
On 5 November 1983, Yabsley married Susan Clatworthy, and they had two children. Following a diagnosis of prostate cancer in 2019, Yabsley separated from his wife and came out as gay in 2020.

Political offices
Preceded by John Fahey	Minister for Corrective Services; 1988–1991	Succeeded by Terry Griffiths
Preceded by John Hannaford	Minister for State Development; 1991–1992	Succeeded by Robert Webster
Preceded by Garry West	Minister for Tourism; 1991–1992	Succeeded by Robert Webster
New South Wales Legislative Assembly
Preceded by Fred Miller	Member for Bligh; 1984–1988	Succeeded by Clover Moore
Preceded by Ray Aston	Member for Vaucluse; 1988–1994	Succeeded by Peter Debnam
