= Ray Aston =

Australian politician (1943–1988)

Member of the New South Wales Parliament for Vaucluse
- In office 31 May 1986 – 23 May 1988
- Preceded by: Rosemary Foot
- Succeeded by: Michael Yabsley

Minister for Corrective Services
- In office 26 March 1988 – 23 May 1988
- Preceded by: John Akister
- Succeeded by: John Fahey

Personal details
- Born: Raymond William Aston; 24 September 1943 Waverley, New South Wales
- Died: 23 May 1988 (aged 44) Sydney, New South Wales
- Party: Liberal
- Parent: William Aston (father)
- Education: University of Sydney
- Occupation: Orthodontist

Raymond William Aston (24 September 1943 – 23 May 1988) was an Australian politician. He was the Liberal member for Vaucluse in the New South Wales Legislative Assembly from 1986 until his early death.

Ray Aston was born in the Sydney suburb of Waverley, the son of William Aston, who was Speaker of the Australian House of Representatives 1967–72. Having attended Waverley College, Aston graduated from the University of Sydney, becoming an orthodontist. In 1986, he was selected as the Liberal candidate for a by-election to be held in the state seat of Vaucluse, which was being vacated by Liberal Deputy Leader Rosemary Foot. Aston was easily elected, gaining over 70% of the vote, with Labor not contesting the by-election, and his nearest rival, the Democrats candidate, polling just over 10%.

At the 1988 state election, Aston was comfortably re-elected and was appointed as Minister for Corrective Services. However, he died suddenly later that year in Sydney, aged 44.

New South Wales Legislative Assembly
Preceded by Rosemary Foot	Member for Vaucluse; 1986–1988	Succeeded by Michael Yabsley
