= Electoral district of Vaucluse =

Vaucluse New South Wales—Legislative Assembly
- Interactive map of district boundaries from the 2023 state election
- State: New South Wales
- Dates current: 1927–present
- MP: Kellie Sloane
- Party: Liberal Party
- Namesake: Vaucluse
- Electors: 59,352 (2023)
- Area: 24.62 km^{2} (9.5 sq mi)
- Demographic: Inner-metropolitan
Electorates around Vaucluse:
North Shore	North Shore	Manly
Sydney	Vaucluse	Pacific Ocean
Heffron	Coogee	Pacific Ocean

Vaucluse is an electoral district of the Legislative Assembly of the Australian state of New South Wales. It is located just east of the district of Sydney in the Eastern Suburbs; it is named after the suburb of Vaucluse.

Vaucluse is one of two original (post-1927 redistribution) electorates to have never been held by the opposing Labor Party and continuously by the Liberal Party and its predecessor parties, the other being Hornsby. It has been represented in the past by former leaders of the Opposition Murray Robson and Peter Debnam; since 2023 the member for Vaucluse has been Kellie Sloane, who has also been leader of the Opposition since 2025.

== Geography ==
On its current boundaries, Vaucluse takes in the suburbs of Bellevue Hill, Bondi Beach, Darling Point, Double Bay, Dover Heights, North Bondi, Point Piper, Rose Bay, Vaucluse, Watsons Bay, Woollahra and parts of Bondi, Centennial Park, Edgecliff and Rushcutters Bay.

== Members for Vaucluse ==
Member	Party	Period
William Foster	United Australia	1927–1936
Murray Robson	Ind. United Australia	1936–1938
Murray Robson	United Australia	1938–1945
Murray Robson	Liberal	1945–1957
Geoffrey Cox	Liberal	1957–1964
Keith Doyle	Liberal	1965–1978
Rosemary Foot	Liberal	1978–1986
Ray Aston	Liberal	1986–1988
Michael Yabsley	Liberal	1988–1994
Peter Debnam	Liberal	1994–2011
Gabrielle Upton	Liberal	2011–2023
Kellie Sloane	Liberal	2023–present

== Election results ==
2023 New South Wales state election: Vaucluse
Party	Candidate	Votes	%	±%
Liberal	Kellie Sloane	24,184	50.1	−6.8
Independent	Karen Freyer	8,236	17.1	+17.1
Labor	Margaret Merten	7,336	15.2	+2.5
Greens	Dominic Wy Kanak	5,632	11.7	−2.1
Liberal Democrats	Gail Stevens	1,166	2.4	+2.4
Sustainable Australia	Kay Dunne	863	1.8	+0.4
Animal Justice	Edward Cameron	846	1.8	+0.4
Total formal votes		48,263	97.9	−0.3
Informal votes		1,055	2.1	+0.3
Turnout		49,318	83.1	−0.7
Notional two-party-preferred count
Liberal	Kellie Sloane	26,574	65.6	−5.0
Labor	Margaret Merten	13,960	34.4	+5.0
Two-candidate-preferred result
Liberal	Kellie Sloane	25,763	62.9	−6.5
Independent	Karen Freyer	15,206	37.1	+37.1
Liberal hold				
