= Candidates of the 1984 New South Wales state election =

This is a list of candidates of the 1984 New South Wales state election. The election was held on 24 March 1984.

== Retiring Members ==
=== Labor ===
- Don Day MLA (Clarence)
- Roger Degen MLA (Balmain)
- Vince Durick MLA (Lakemba)
- Jack Ferguson MLA (Merrylands)
- Pat Flaherty MLA (Granville)
- Lin Gordon MLA (Murrumbidgee)
- Keith O'Connell MLA (Peats)
- Eric Ramsay (Wollongong)
- Don Burton MLC
- Roy Turner MLC

=== Liberal ===
- David Arblaster MLA (Mosman)
- Fred Duncan MLC
- Derek Freeman MLC
- John Holt MLC
- Nathanael Orr MLC
- Bill Sandwith MLC

=== National ===
- Jack Boyd MLA (Byron)
- Ron Brewer MLA (Goulburn)
- Jim Brown MLA (Oxley)
- Bill Kennedy MLC

== Legislative Assembly ==
Sitting members are shown in bold text. Successful candidates are highlighted in the relevant colour. Where there is possible confusion, an asterisk (*) is also used.

Electorate	Held by	Labor candidate	Coalition candidate	Democrats candidate	Other candidates
Albury	Labor	**Harold Mair**	Ian Glachan (Lib)	Christopher Rooke	
Ashfield	Labor	**Paul Whelan**	Geoffrey Howe (Lib)		
Auburn	Labor	**Peter Cox**	Rudolph Ognibene (Lib)		
Balmain	Labor	Peter Crawford	Gibson Bennie (Lib)	Karen McEwan	Noel Hazard (SLL)
Bankstown	Labor	**Ric Mochalski**	Terry McDonald (Lib)		
Barwon	National	Bill Sinclair	**Wal Murray** (Nat)		Andrew Von Mergersen (Ind)
Bass Hill	Labor	**Neville Wran**	Peter Swiderski (Lib)		Julien Droulers (RP); Sandor Torzsok (CA)
Bathurst	Labor	**Mick Clough**	Clive Osborne (Nat); Trevor Toole (Nat)	Louis Winters	
Blacktown	Labor	**John Aquilina**	David Bannerman (Lib)		
Bligh	Labor	**Fred Miller**	Michael Yabsley (Lib)	Brian Hillman	
Blue Mountains	Labor	**Bob Debus**	Margaret Bradshaw (Lib)	Steve Franklin	Bruce Fry (CTA)
Broken Hill	Labor	**Bill Beckroge**	Geoffrey Anderson (Lib); Neville Crisp (Nat)		
Burrinjuck	Labor	**Terry Sheahan**	John Sharp (Nat)	Joyce Copeland	
Burwood	Labor	**Phil O'Neill**	Paul Zammit (Lib)	Stephen Kirkham	
Byron	National	Lyle Robb	Don Beck (Nat)	Kenneth Nicholson	James Mangleson (Ind); Alan Mountain (Ind)
Cabramatta	Labor	**Eric Bedford**	Maria Heggie (Lib)		
Camden	Labor	**Ralph Brading**	John Fahey (Lib)		
Campbelltown	Labor	**Michael Knight**	Violette Samaha (Lib)		Gordon Fetterplace (Ind); Edward Houston (Ind)
Canterbury	Labor	**Kevin Stewart**	Robert Sharp (Lib)		
Castlereagh	National	Jim Curran	**Roger Wotton** (Nat)	Anne Graham	
Cessnock	Labor	**Stan Neilly**	Gerard Berkhout (Lib)		
Charlestown	Labor	**Richard Face**	Peter Wilson (Lib)		
Clarence	Labor	Bill Day	Ian Causley (Nat)		Denis O'Keeffe (Ind)
Coffs Harbour	National	Laurence Brown	**Matt Singleton** (Nat)		
Coogee	Labor	**Michael Cleary**	Ken Finn (Lib)	Gavan Schneider	
Corrimal	Labor	**Laurie Kelly**	Colin Bruton (Lib)		
Cronulla	Labor	**Michael Egan**	Malcolm Kerr (Lib)		
Davidson	Liberal	Julie Sutton	**Terry Metherell** (Lib)	Anthony Dunne	
Drummoyne	Labor	**John Murray**	Ben Sonego (Lib)		
Dubbo	National	Gordon Lerve	**Gerry Peacocke** (Nat)		
Earlwood	Labor	**Ken Gabb**	John Ryan (Lib)	Paul Terrett	
East Hills	Labor	**Pat Rogan**	Max Parker (Lib)	Margaret Vitlin	
Eastwood	Liberal	Joyce Tuckwell	**Jim Clough** (Lib)	Christopher Dunkerley	
Elizabeth	Labor	**Pat Hills**	Philip Daley (Lib)	Jennifer MacLeod	Michael Matthews (Ind); Nadar Ponnuswamy (Ind)
Fairfield	Labor	**Janice Crosio**	Geoffrey Goninon (Lib)		Raymon Wilson (Ind)
Georges River	Labor	**Frank Walker**	Warren Griffin (Lib)		
Gladesville	Labor	**Rodney Cavalier**	Ivan Petch (Lib)	John Sanders	John Egan (Ind); Michael Lardelli (Ind)
Gloucester	National	John Eastman	**Leon Punch** (Nat)		
Gordon	Liberal	Robert Dubler	**Tim Moore** (Lib)	Kevin Gartrell-Wardale	
Gosford	Labor	**Brian McGowan**	Chris Hartcher (Lib); Donald Leggett (Nat)	Gary Chestnut	
Goulburn	National	Bob Stephens	Robert Webster (Nat)		Miriam Naughton (Ind); Ronald Sarina (Ind)
Granville	Labor	Laurie Ferguson	Yvonne Maio (Lib)		
Hawkesbury	Liberal	Harmanus Toorneman	**Kevin Rozzoli** (Lib)		
Heathcote	Labor	**Rex Jackson**	Gordon Davies (Lib)	Fran Johnson	
Heffron	Labor	**Laurie Brereton**	Barry Devine (Lib)		
Hornsby	Liberal	Christopher Gorrick	**Neil Pickard** (Lib)	Michael Pettigrew	
Hurstville	Labor	**Kevin Ryan**	Guy Yeomans (Lib)		
Illawarra	Labor	**George Petersen**	Dennis Owen (Lib)	James Kay	
Ingleburn	Labor	**Stan Knowles**	Gary Lucas (Lib)		
Kiama	Labor	**Bill Knott**	Warren Steel (Lib)		
Kogarah	Labor	**Brian Langton**	Robert Young (Lib)	Ronald George	
Ku-ring-gai	Liberal	Ian Cameron	**Nick Greiner** (Lib)	Pamela Tuckwell	
Lachlan	National	Tim West	**Ian Armstrong** (Nat)		
Lake Macquarie	Labor	**Merv Hunter**	Edward Hayes (Lib)	Edwina Wilson	
Lakemba	Labor	Wes Davoren	Stephen Law (Lib)		
Lane Cove	Liberal	Miron Shapira	**John Dowd** (Lib)	Graham Baker	
Lismore	National	Claire Newton		Ivor Brown	**Bruce Duncan** (Ind)
Liverpool	Labor	**George Paciullo**	Anthony Garbin (Lib)		David Bransdon (Ind)
Maitland	Labor	**Allan Walsh**	Robert Gee (Nat); Donald Wilkinson (Lib)		
Manly	Labor	**Alan Stewart**	David Hay (Lib)	Robert Leys	Joan Cooke (Ind); Margaret Lee (Ind)
Maroubra	Labor	**Bob Carr**	Phillip Abadee (Lib)		
Marrickville	Labor	**Andrew Refshauge**	Peter Rout (Lib)	Michael Walsh	
Merrylands	Labor	Geoff Irwin	Garo Gabrielian (Lib)		Alan Byers (Ind)
Miranda	Labor	**Bill Robb**	Ron Phillips (Lib)	Michael Moriarty	
Monaro	Labor	**John Akister**	Ronald Formann (Nat); John Munro (Lib)		
Mosman	Liberal	Liliane Leroy	Phillip Smiles (Lib)	Christine Townend	Dom Lopez (Ind)
Murray	National	Michael Anthony	**Tim Fischer** (Nat)	Gregory Butler	John Murphy (Ind)
Murrumbidgee	Labor	Margaret Delves	Adrian Cruickshank* (Nat); Brian Thornton (Lib)		Thomas Marriott (Ind)
Newcastle	Labor	**Arthur Wade**	Patricia Forsythe (Lib)	Stephen Jeffries	Frank Blefari (Ind)
Northcott	Liberal	Jan Dekker	Bruce Baird (Lib)	Clifford Wiltshire	
Northern Tablelands	Labor	**Bill McCarthy**	Claude Cainero (Nat)		
North Shore	Independent	Peter Semmler	Jillian Skinner (Lib)		**Ted Mack** (Ind)
Orange	National	Trevor Jaeger	**Garry West** (Nat)		
Oxley	National	George Viskauskas	Bruce Jeffery (Nat)	William Giles	John Barrett (Ind)
Parramatta	Labor	**Barry Wilde**	John Worthington (Lib)	John Macrae	Kenneth Hale (Ind)
Peats	Labor	Paul Landa	Jim Lloyd (Lib)	John Aitken	
Penrith	Labor	**Peter Anderson**	Ross Shuttleworth (Lib)	Kevin Crameri	Ian Perry (Ind)
Pittwater	Liberal	Denise Morgan	**Max Smith** (Lib)	Graeme MacLennan	John Webeck (Ind)
Riverstone	Labor	**Richard Amery**	Kenneth Jessup (Lib)		
Rockdale	Labor	**Brian Bannon**	Bob Gemmell (Lib)		Edwin Bellchambers (Ind)
Ryde	Labor	**Garry McIlwaine**	Ian Kortlang (Lib)	Peter Chambers	
St Marys	Labor	**Ron Mulock**	Daryl Chamberlain (Lib)	Viv Carter	
Seven Hills	Labor	**Bob Christie**	Marc Clifford (Lib)		
South Coast	Independent	Robyn Drysdale	David Egan (Lib)		**John Hatton** (Ind)
Swansea	Labor	**Don Bowman**	Milton Caine (Lib)	Lyn Godfrey	Ann Leahy (SLL)
Tamworth	National	Garry Ryan	**Noel Park** (Nat)	Anne Irvine	
The Hills	Liberal	Barry Calvert	**Fred Caterson** (Lib)	Toni Chapman	John Griffiths (Ind)
Tuggerah	Labor	**Harry Moore**	Leslie Nunn (Lib)	Lynn Sawyer	Clem Payne (Ind)
Upper Hunter	National	Colleen Green	**Col Fisher** (Nat)		
Vaucluse	Liberal	David Curtis	**Rosemary Foot** (Lib)	Joseph Zingarelli	
Wagga Wagga	Liberal	Barry Leal	**Joe Schipp** (Lib)	Scott Milne	
Wakehurst	Labor	**Tom Webster**	John Booth (Lib)	Laurence Bourke	Maurice Foley (Ind)
Wallsend	Labor	**Ken Booth**	Garry Carter (Lib)		
Waratah	Labor	John Price	Ashley Saunders (Lib)	Wayne Jarman	John Cain (Ind); **Sam Jones** (Ind)
Waverley	Labor	**Ernie Page**	Dick Davidson (Lib)	Heather Meers	Peter Kristofferson (Ind); Dorothy Sekers (Ind)
Wentworthville	Labor	**Ernie Quinn**	Colin Edwards (Lib)	David Knight	
Willoughby	Liberal	Eddie Britt	**Peter Collins** (Lib)	Sean Turkington	
Wollongong	Labor	Rex Connor	Ronald Brooks (Lib)		Frank Arkell* (Ind); Rudolph Dezelin (Ind); Julius Kudrynski (Ind); Phillip Xenos (Ind)
Woronora	Labor	**Maurie Keane**	Chris Downy (Lib)	Ronald Hellyer	

== Legislative Council ==
Sitting members are shown in bold text. Tickets that elected at least one MLC are highlighted in the relevant colour. Successful candidates are identified by an asterisk (*).

Labor candidates	Coalition candidates	Democrats candidates	CTA candidates	Progress candidates	CCP candidates
1. **Johno Johnson***; 2. **Delcia Kite***; 3. **Ron Dyer***; 4. **John Morris***; 5. **Ann Symonds***; 6. Keith Enderbury*; 7. Mick Ibbett*; 8. Judith Walker; 9. Tony Kelly; 10. Paul Toplis	1. John Hannaford* (Lib); 2. **Sir Adrian Solomons*** (Nat); 3. Jim Samios* (Lib); 4. John Jobling* (Lib); 5. Richard Bull* (Nat); 6. Beryl Evans* (Lib); 7. Judy Jakins* (Nat); 8. Ray Aston (Lib); 9. Brian Flower (Lib); 10. Henry Mallam (Lib)	1. Ray Griffiths; 2. Rodney Dominish; 3. Peter Hains; 4. Rodney Irvine	1. Jim Cameron*; 2. Marie Bignold; 3. Graeme McLennan; 4. Kevin Hume; 5. Elaine Nile	1. Marjorie Wisby; 2. Archibald Brown	1. Verdun Walsh; 2. Margaret Bickley; 3. Peter Hinton
SMP candidates	Ungrouped candidates				
1. Samuel Calvert; 2. Mary Burwood; 3. Lola Harradine	Michael Jeffreys; David Noffs; Jon Axtens; Brian Howard; George Sewell; Oscar Landricho				

== See also ==
- Members of the New South Wales Legislative Assembly, 1984–1988
- Members of the New South Wales Legislative Council, 1984–1988
