= Results of the 1984 New South Wales Legislative Council election =

Legislative Council election for New South Wales, Australia in March 1984

New South Wales state election, 24 March 1984 Legislative Council
Enrolled voters	3,330,350				
Votes cast	3,081,223		Turnout	92.52	+1.38
Informal votes	205,275		Informal	6.66	–0.18
Summary of votes by party
Party	Primary votes	%	Swing	Seats won	Seats held
Labor	1,348,348	46.88	–4.90	7	24
Liberal/National Coalition	1,225,519	42.61	+8.84	7	18
Call to Australia	175,068	6.09	–3.02	1	2
Democrats	90,634	3.15	–0.88	0	1
Concerned Citizens	14,036	0.49	+0.49	0	0
Progress	6,416	0.22	+0.11	0	0
Silent Majority	3,899	0.14	+0.14	0	0
Independent	12,028	0.42	+0.35	0	0
Total	2,875,948			15	

This is a list of results for the Legislative Council at the 1984 New South Wales state election.

== Results ==
1984 New South Wales state election: Legislative Council
Party	Candidate	Votes	%	±%
Quota		179,747		
Labor	1. Johno Johnson (elected 1); 2. Delcia Kite (elected 3); 3. Ron Dyer (elected 5); 4. John Morris (elected 7); 5. Ann Symonds (elected 9); 6. Keith Enderbury (elected 11); 7. Mick Ibbett (elected 13); 8. Judith Walker; 9. Tony Kelly; 10. Paul Toplis	1,348,348	46.9	−4.9
Liberal/National Coalition	1. John Hannaford (elected 2); 2. Adrian Solomons (elected 4); 3. Jim Samios (elected 6); 4. John Jobling (elected 8); 5. Richard Bull (elected 10); 6. Beryl Evans (elected 12); 7. Judy Jakins (elected 15); 8. Ray Aston; 9. Brian Flower; 10. Henry Mallam	1,225,519	42.6	+8.8
Call to Australia	1. Jim Cameron (elected 14); 2. Marie Bignold; 3. Graeme McLennan; 4. Kevin Hume; 5. Elaine Nile	175,068	6.1	−3.0
Democrats	1. Ray Griffiths; 2. Rodney Dominish; 3. Peter Hains; 4. Rodney Irvine	90,634	3.2	−0.8
Concerned Citizens	1. Verdun Walsh; 2. Margaret Bickley; 3. Peter Hinton	14,036	0.5	+0.5
Independent	Michael Jeffreys	6,644	0.2	+0.2
Progress	1. Marjorie Wisby; 2. Archibald Brown	6,416	0.2	+0.1
Silent Majority	1. Samuel Calvert; 2. Mary Burwood; 3. Lola Harradine	3,899	0.1	+0.1
Independent	Oscar Landicho	2,412	0.1	+0.1
Independent	David Noffs	1,315	0.1	+0.1
Independent	Brian Howard	806	0.03	+0.03
Independent	George Sewell	483	0.02	+0.02
Independent	Jon Axtens	368	0.01	+0.01
Total formal votes		2,875,948	93.3	+0.1
Informal votes		205,275	6.7	−0.1
Turnout		3,081,223	92.5	+1.4

== Continuing members ==
The following MLCs were not up for re-election this year.

Member	Party	Term
Clive Healey	Labor	1978–1988
Joe Thompson	Labor	1978–1988
Peter Watkins	Labor	1978–1988
Barrie Unsworth	Labor	1978–1986
Dorothy Isaksen	Labor	1978–1988
Marie Fisher	Labor	1978–1988
Norm King	Labor	1978–1988
Deirdre Grusovin	Labor	1978–1988
Jim Kaldis	Labor	1978–1988
Paul Landa	Labor	1981–1991
Jack Hallam	Labor	1981–1991
Jack Garland	Labor	1981–1991
Barney French	Labor	1981–1991
Franca Arena	Labor	1981–1991
George Brenner	Labor	1981–1991
Ken Reed	Labor	1981–1991
Bryan Vaughan	Labor	1981–1991
Virginia Chadwick	Liberal	1978–1988
Frank Calabro	Liberal	1978–1988
Lloyd Lange	Liberal	1978–1986
Peter Philips	Liberal	1978–1988
Max Willis	Liberal	1981–1991
Ted Pickering	Liberal	1981–1991
John Matthews	Liberal	1981–1991
Bob Rowland Smith	National	1978–1988
Toby MacDiarmid	National	1978–1988
Jack Doohan	National	1981–1991
Richard Killen	National	1981–1991
Fred Nile	Call to Australia	1981–1991
Elisabeth Kirkby	Democrats	1981–1991

== See also ==
- Results of the 1984 New South Wales state election (Legislative Assembly)
- Candidates of the 1984 New South Wales state election
- Members of the New South Wales Legislative Council, 1984–1988
