= Members of the New South Wales Legislative Council, 1984–1988 =

Members of the New South Wales Legislative Council who served in the 48th Parliament were elected at the 1978, 1981 and 1984 elections. Members served for three terms of the Legislative Assembly, which, as a result of the 1981 referendum meant the maximum term was twelve years. The 15 members elected in 1978 did not face re-election until 1988, the 15 members elected in 1981 did not face re-election until 1992 and the 15 members elected in 1984 did not face re-election until 1996. The President was Johno Johnson.

Name	Party	End term	Years in office
Franca Arena	Labor	1992	1981–1999
Marie Bignold (Note: Call to Australia MLC Jim Cameron resigned on 30 October 1984 after suffering a serious heart attack. Marie Bignold, his running mate from the 1984 state election, was appointed to the resulting casual vacancy on 5 December.)	Call to Australia	1996	1984–1991
George Brenner	Labor	1992	1981–1991
Richard Bull	National	1996	1984–2000
Frank Calabro	Liberal	1988	1970–1988
Jim Cameron	Call to Australia	1996	1984
Virginia Chadwick	Liberal	1988	1978–1999
Jack Doohan	National	1992	1978–1991
Ron Dyer	Labor	1996	1979–2003
Michael Egan (Note: Labor MLC Barrie Unsworth resigned on 15 July 1986 in order to contest a by-election in the Legislative Assembly seat of Rockdale. The by-election had been organised so as to allow Unsworth to shift to the Legislative Assembly in order to succeed Neville Wran as Premier of New South Wales. Former MLA Michael Egan was appointed to the resulting casual vacancy on 24 September.)	Labor	1988	1986–2005
Keith Enderbury	Labor	1996	1984–1995
Beryl Evans	Liberal	1996	1984–1995
Marie Fisher	Labor	1988	1978–1988
Barney French	Labor	1992	1973–1991
Jack Garland	Labor	1992	1981–1990
Deirdre Grusovin	Labor	1988	1978–1990
Jack Hallam	Labor	1992	1973–1991
Fred Hankinson	Labor	1992	1984–1991
John Hannaford	Liberal	1996	1984–1999
Clive Healey	Labor	1988	1970–1988
Mick Ibbett	Labor	1996	1984–1991
Dorothy Isaksen	Labor	1988	1978–1988, 1990–1999
Judy Jakins	National	1996	1984–1991
John Jobling	Liberal	1996	1984–2003
Johno Johnson	Labor	1996	1976–2001
Jim Kaldis	Labor	1988	1978–1999
Tony Kelly (Note: Labor MLC Peter Watkins resigned on 1 July 1987. Tony Kelly was appointed to the resulting casual vacancy on 17 September.)	Labor	1988	1987–1988, 1997–2011
Richard Killen	National	1992	1981–1991
Norm King	Labor	1988	1978–1988
Elisabeth Kirkby	Democrats	1992	1981–1998
Delcia Kite	Labor	1996	1976–1995
Lloyd Lange (Note: Liberal MLC Lloyd Lange resigned on 6 January 1986. Former MLC Greg Percival was appointed to the resulting casual vacancy on 5 February.)	Liberal	1988	1974–1986
Toby MacDiarmid (Note: Toby MacDiarmid was elected as a representative of the National Party, but resigned from the party in April 1985. He served out the remainder of his term as an independent.)	National/Independent	1988	1973–1988
John Matthews	Liberal	1992	1981–1991
John Morris (Note: Labor MLC John Morris resigned on 1 November 1984 to contest the Senate at the 1984 federal election. Judith Walker was appointed as his replacement on 5 December.)	Labor	1996	1976–1984
Fred Nile	Call to Australia	1992	1981–2004, 2004–present
Greg Percival	Liberal	1988	1977–1978, 1986–1988
Peter Philips	Liberal	1988	1976–1988
Ted Pickering	Liberal	1992	1976–1995
Ken Reed	Labor	1992	1981–1991
Bob Rowland Smith	National	1988	1974–1999
Jim Samios	Liberal	1996	1984–2003
Sir Adrian Solomons	National	1996	1969–1991
Ann Symonds	Labor	1996	1982–1998
Joe Thompson	Labor	1988	1974–1988
Bryan Vaughan	Labor	1992	1981–1999
Judith Walker	Labor	1996	1984–1995
Barrie Unsworth	Labor	1988	1978–1986
Peter Watkins	Labor	1988	1978–1987
Max Willis	Liberal	1992	1970–1999
