= Results of the 1988 New South Wales Legislative Council election =

Legislative Council election for New South Wales, Australia in March 1988

Party	Votes	%	+/–	Seats			
Party	Votes	%	+/–	Seats Won	Not Up	Total Seats	Seat Change
Liberal National Coalition	1,403,300	46.01	▲3.54	7	12	19	▲1
Labor	1,140,634	37.40	▼9.37	6	15	21	▼3
Call to Australia	174,553	5.72	▼0.35	1	2	3	▲1
Democrats	90,634	2.97	▼0.42	1	1	2	▲1
Independent EFF	72,965	2.39	New	0	0	0	New
Community Independents	52,992	1.74	New	0	0	0	New
Environment Group	48,536	1.59	New	0	0	0	New
Nuclear Disarmament	28,161	0.92	New	0	0	0	New
Aboriginal Team	13,363	0.44	New	0	0	0	New
Humanist Party	11,895	0.39	New	0	0	0	New
Defence Ex-Service Team	6,970	0.23	New	0	0	0	New
Independents	3,396	0.11	▼0.31	0	0	0	0
Marijuana	2,713	0.09	▲0.09	0	0	0	0
Total	3,050,112	100.00	–	15	30	45	–
Valid votes	3,050,112	91.95					
Invalid/blank votes	267,113	8.05	▲1.42				
Total votes	3,317,225	100.00	–				
Registered voters/turnout	3,541,447	93.67	▼0.60				

This is a list of results for the Legislative Council at the 1988 New South Wales state election.

== Results ==
1988 New South Wales state election: Legislative Council
Party	Candidate	Votes	%	±%
Quota		190,047		
Liberal/National Coalition	1. Virginia Chadwick (elected 1); 2. Bob Rowland Smith (elected 3); 3. Marlene Goldsmith (elected 5); 4. Brian Pezzutti (elected 7); 5. Duncan Gay (elected 9); 6. Stephen Mutch (elected 11); 7. Helen Sham-Ho (elected 12); 8. Michael Barnes; 9. Bruce Rowley; 10. Carol Raye	1,403,300	46.2	+3.6
Labor	1. Deirdre Grusovin (elected 2); 2. Ian Macdonald (elected 4); 3. Jim Kaldis (elected 6); 4. Paul O'Grady (elected 8); 5. Michael Egan (elected 10); 6. Andy Manson (elected 13); 7. Dorothy Isaksen; 8. Tony Kelly; 9. Ron Cunningham; 10. George Thompson	1,140,634	37.5	−9.4
Call to Australia	1. Elaine Nile (elected 14); 2. Kevin Hume; 3. Patricia Judge; 4. William Bird; 5. Percy Everingham	173,569	5.7	−0.4
Democrats	1. Richard Jones (elected 15); 2. Ray Griffiths; 3. Rod Bennison	82,248	2.7	−0.5
Independent EFF	1. Joe Kanan; 2. Vince White; 3. Jack Moffitt; 4. Geoffrey Sutton; 5. Patrick Lever; 6. Jane Abbott; 7. Peter Catts	72,965	2.4	+2.4
Community Independents	1. Jack Mundey; 2. Stacey Miers; 3. William Whiley	52,992	1.7	+1.7
Environment Group	1. Milo Dunphy; 2. Christine Townend; 3. Alice Oppen	48,536	1.6	+1.6
Nuclear Disarmament	1. Colin Charlton; 2. Dennis Wyatt	28,161	0.9	+0.9
Aboriginal Team	1. Mildred Ingram; 2. Anthony Ammatto; 3. Aubry Phillips	13,363	0.4	+0.4
Humanist	1. Vito Radice; 2. Noel Whitaker	11,895	0.4	+0.4
Defence Ex-Service	1. Rowley McMahon; 2. David Herd	6,970	0.2	0.2
Marijuana	1. Macciza MacPherson; 2. Nick Brash	2,713	0.1	+0.1
Independent	Carlos Dutra	1,608	0.05	+0.05
Independent	Michael Smith	983	0.03	+0.03
Independent	John Butt	566	0.02	+0.02
Independent	Phillip Winchester	239	0.01	+0.01
Total formal votes		3,040,742	91.9	−1.4
Informal votes		267,113	8.1	+1.4
Turnout		3,307,855	93.4	+0.9

== Continuing members ==
The following MLCs were not up for re-election this year.

Member	Party	Term
Paul Landa	Labor	1981–1991
Jack Hallam	Labor	1981–1991
Jack Garland	Labor	1981–1991
Barney French	Labor	1981–1991
Franca Arena	Labor	1981–1991
George Brenner	Labor	1981–1991
Ken Reed	Labor	1981–1991
Bryan Vaughan	Labor	1981–1991
Johno Johnson	Labor	1984–1995
Delcia Kite	Labor	1984–1995
Ron Dyer	Labor	1984–1995
Judith Walker	Labor	1984–1995
Ann Symonds	Labor	1984–1995
Keith Enderbury	Labor	1984–1995
Mick Ibbett	Labor	1984–1991
Max Willis	Liberal	1981–1991
Ted Pickering	Liberal	1981–1991
John Matthews	Liberal	1981–1991
John Hannaford	Liberal	1984–1995
Jim Samios	Liberal	1984–1995
John Jobling	Liberal	1984–1995
Beryl Evans	Liberal	1984–1995
Jack Doohan	National	1981–1991
Richard Killen	National	1981–1991
Adrian Solomons	National	1984–1995
Richard Bull	National	1984–1995
Judy Jakins	National	1984–1991
Fred Nile	Call to Australia	1981–1991
Marie Bignold	Call to Australia	1984–1991
Elisabeth Kirkby	Democrats	1981–1991

== See also ==
- Results of the 1988 New South Wales state election (Legislative Assembly)
- Candidates of the 1988 New South Wales state election
- Members of the New South Wales Legislative Council, 1988–1991
