= Electoral results for the district of Northcott =

Election results for Northcott, New South Wales, Australia

Northcott, an electoral district of the Legislative Assembly in the Australian state of New South Wales was created in 1968 and abolished in 1999.

Election	Member	Party
1968	Jim Cameron	Liberal
1973	Jim Cameron	Liberal
1976	Jim Cameron	Liberal
1978	Jim Cameron	Liberal
1981	Jim Cameron	Liberal / Call to Australia
1984	Bruce Baird	Liberal
1988	Bruce Baird	Liberal
1991	Bruce Baird	Liberal
1995	Barry O'Farrell	Liberal

== Election results ==
=== Elections in the 1990s ===
==== 1995 ====
1995 New South Wales state election: Northcott
Party	Candidate	Votes	%	±%
Liberal	Barry O'Farrell	20,747	60.1	−7.9
Labor	Andrew Leigh	8,178	23.7	+6.4
Democrats	Suzanne Reddy	3,589	10.4	−1.0
Against Further Immigration	Steve Van Wyk	2,034	5.9	+5.9
Total formal votes		34,548	96.5	+3.3
Informal votes		1,243	3.5	−3.3
Turnout		35,791	93.2	
Two-party-preferred result
Liberal	Barry O'Farrell	22,657	68.6	−7.8
Labor	Andrew Leigh	10,358	31.4	+7.8
Liberal hold		Swing	−7.8	

==== 1991 ====
1991 New South Wales state election: Northcott
Party	Candidate	Votes	%	±%
Liberal	Bruce Baird	22,066	67.9	−4.9
Labor	Vanessa O'Meara	5,599	17.2	−9.2
Democrats	Kerry Bamford	3,686	11.3	+11.3
Call to Australia	Colin Hornshaw	1,129	3.5	+3.5
Total formal votes		32,480	93.3	−3.7
Informal votes		2,344	6.7	+3.7
Turnout		34,824	94.0	
Two-party-preferred result
Liberal	Bruce Baird	23,420	76.4	+3.2
Labor	Vanessa O'Meara	7,241	23.6	−3.2
Liberal hold		Swing	+3.2	

=== Elections in the 1980s ===
==== 1988 ====
1988 New South Wales state election: Northcott
Party	Candidate	Votes	%	±%
Liberal	Bruce Baird	23,271	76.0	+8.1
Labor	John Drew	7,350	24.0	−1.6
Total formal votes		30,621	96.9	−1.3
Informal votes		988	3.1	+1.3
Turnout		31,609	94.5	
Liberal hold		Swing	+5.0	

==== 1984 ====
1984 New South Wales state election: Northcott
Party	Candidate	Votes	%	±%
Liberal	Bruce Baird	23,048	66.9	+5.6
Labor	Jan Dekker	9,149	26.6	−6.4
Democrats	Clifford Wiltshire	2,236	6.5	+0.9
Total formal votes		34,433	98.2	+0.9
Informal votes		647	1.8	−0.9
Turnout		35,080	93.2	+1.5
Two-party-preferred result
Liberal	Bruce Baird		70.0	+5.9
Labor	Jan Dekker		30.0	−5.9
Liberal hold		Swing	+5.9	

==== 1981 ====
1981 New South Wales state election: Northcott
Party	Candidate	Votes	%	±%
Liberal	Jim Cameron	19,173	61.3	+6.8
Labor	Therese McGee	10,322	33.0	−6.7
Democrats	Ian Irwin	1,763	5.6	−0.2
Total formal votes		31,258	97.3	
Informal votes		879	2.7	
Turnout		32,137	91.7	
Two-party-preferred result
Liberal	Jim Cameron	19,682	64.1	+6.7
Labor	Therese McGee	11,002	35.9	−6.7
Liberal hold		Swing	+6.7	

=== Elections in the 1970s ===
==== 1978 ====
1978 New South Wales state election: Northcott
Party	Candidate	Votes	%	±%
Liberal	Jim Cameron	17,784	54.5	−13.7
Labor	Kristine Klugman	12,969	39.7	+7.9
Democrats	Graham Blackman	1,900	5.8	+5.8
Total formal votes		32,653	98.6	0.0
Informal votes		460	1.4	0.0
Turnout		33,113	93.2	+0.3
Two-party-preferred result
Liberal	Jim Cameron	18,734	57.4	−10.8
Labor	Kristine Klugman	13,919	42.6	+10.8
Liberal hold		Swing	−10.8	

==== 1976 ====
1976 New South Wales state election: Northcott
Party	Candidate	Votes	%	±%
Liberal	Jim Cameron	21,408	68.2	+2.8
Labor	Sabine Willis	9,982	31.8	+31.8
Total formal votes		31,390	98.6	+1.4
Informal votes		428	1.4	−1.4
Turnout		31,818	92.9	−0.3
Liberal hold		Swing	−2.6	

==== 1973 ====
1973 New South Wales state election: Northcott
Party	Candidate	Votes	%	±%
Liberal	Jim Cameron	18,686	65.4	−1.7
Australia	Vivienne Berzin	6,829	23.9	+2.7
Democratic Labor	Michael Kane	2,449	8.6	+8.6
Republican	Franciscus Leechburch-Auwers	616	2.2	+2.2
Total formal votes		28,580	97.2	
Informal votes		830	2.8	
Turnout		29,410	93.2	
Two-candidate-preferred result
Liberal	Jim Cameron	20,219	70.4	−2.6
Australia	Vivienne Berzin	8,361	29.6	+2.6
Liberal hold		Swing	−2.6	

==== 1971 ====
1971 New South Wales state election: Northcott
Party	Candidate	Votes	%	±%
Liberal	Jim Cameron	17,553	67.1	−9.0
Australia	David Haig	5,544	21.2	+21.2
Defence of Government Schools	Jane Gray	3,048	11.7	+11.7
Total formal votes		26,145	97.3	
Informal votes		711	2.7	
Turnout		26,856	93.0	
Two-candidate-preferred result
Liberal	Jim Cameron	19,077	73.0	−7.0
Australia	David Haig	7,068	27.0	+7.0
Liberal hold		Swing	−7.0	

=== Elections in the 1960s ===
==== 1968 ====
1968 New South Wales state election: Northcott
Party	Candidate	Votes	%	±%
Liberal	Jim Cameron	19,330	76.1	
Labor	Pauline Unsworth	4,831	19.0	
Democratic Labor	John Kennedy	1,252	4.9	
Total formal votes		25,413	96.5	
Informal votes		912	3.5	
Turnout		26,325	93.1	
Two-party-preferred result
Liberal	Jim Cameron	20,332	80.0	+2.3
Labor	Pauline Unsworth	5,081	20.0	−2.3
Liberal win		(new seat)		
