= John XXIII College =

John XXIII College may refer to:

- John XXIII College, Cochabamba, Bolivia
- John XXIII College, Perth, Australia
- John XXIII College, Australian National University, Canberra, Australia

== See also ==
- Pope John XXIII High School (disambiguation)
