= John XXIII College, Cochabamba =

John XXIII College
- Spanish: Colegio Juan XXIII

Location
- Cocaraya, Km.27 highway to Oruro; Cochabamba, Cercado; Bolivia
- Coordinates: 17°28′32″S 66°20′30″W

Information
- Type: Private secondary school
- Motto: Spanish: Ser libres para ser responsables, ser responsables para ser libres (Be free to be responsible, be responsible for being free)
- Religious affiliation: Catholic
- Denomination: Society of Jesus
- Patron saint: John XXIII
- Established: 1964; 62 years ago
- Founder: Fr. Enrique Conraets
- Rector: Luis F. Zamora, SJ
- Grades: 7-12
- Gender: Co-educational
- Website: www.juanchosnet.org

John XXIII College (Spanish: Colegio Juan XXIII) is a private Catholic secondary school, located in Cochabamba, Cercado, Bolivia. The school was founded by Fr. Enrique Conraets in 1964 in La Paz, and follows a work-study model. In 1969, the school with all the interns moved to Cochabamba and in 1971, the Jesuits took the administration of the school as the founder left for Belgium.

At the beginning, most of its students came from low-income families in mining towns. At the present time, the students still come from low-income families, but since 2007 the internship has been closed and the students come from the area between Cochabamba city and the little towns in the road to Oruro city.

== Educational model ==
John XXIII College is administered by the Society of Jesus and covers six years of secondary school and a technical degree in metal mechanics and electricity. It now follows the Fe y Alegría school model which originated in Venezuela in 1955. The Inter-American Development Bank assisted in funding the extension of this model to more schools in Bolivia. John XXIII graduates contributed to this effort.

In 1986, during a Latin American Congress of Fe y Alegría in Cochabamba, John XXIII was named as a Latin American model of education for production. The school along with its utopian vision have been described as "little new Bolivia".

John XXIII College uses a system of student self-government, with a student prime minister and other ministers, to enable students to experience democracy and to expand their social skills.

Simon Education Foundation in 2007 initiated a Pilot Center for Technology Education in Cochabamba at John XIII that has served as a model for six other such centers in Bolivia; their first effort was training electricians.

Facilities include sports facilities, library, audio-visual rooms, informatics rooms and four technical formation rooms.

== See also ==
- Catholic Church in Bolivia
- Education in Bolivia
- List of Jesuit schools
