= Residential colleges of the Australian National University =

There are eleven residential colleges affiliated with ANU—Bruce Hall, Ursula Hall, Burgmann College, John XXIII College, Toad Hall, Burton & Garran Hall, Graduate House, Fenner Hall, Wamburun Hall, Wright Hall, and Yukeembruk Village.

== Burgmann College ==
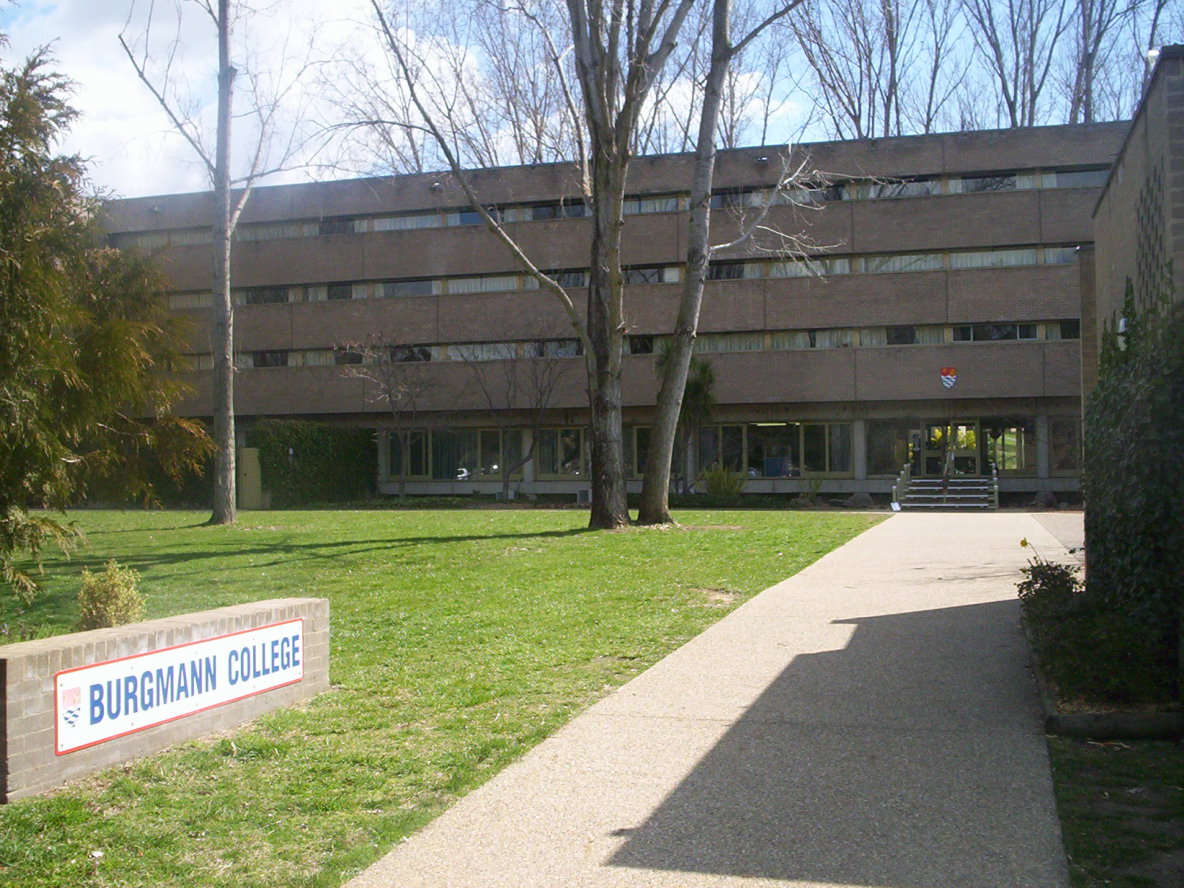
Burgmann from the front lawn.

Burgmann College established in 1971, is an independent college that is affiliated with the Australian National University. It is the only Australian college to combine undergraduate accommodation with a substantial postgraduate student body. It houses a total of 378 residents: 258 undergraduate residents in the main college, and another 120 residents in the adjoining Burgmann Undergraduate and Postgraduate Village. Burgmann College is located inside the western corner of the campus, close to the waters of Lake Burley Griffin. The college is named after Ernest H. Burgmann (1885–1967), the progressive Anglican Bishop (of Goulburn from 1934, and Canberra and Goulburn from 1950 to 1960).

== Burton & Garran Hall ==
Burton and Garran Hall is a self catered residential college. It houses approximately 515 students and consists of five blocks. Burton and Garran Hall was originally established as two separate Halls in 1965, and each Hall had separate administration. Both Halls combined in 1983 to form a single residential college. Garran Hall was named after Sir Robert Garran, the first Solicitor-General of Australia. Burton Hall was named after Herbert Burton, who was appointed Principal and Professor of Economic History at Canberra University College in 1949.

== Fenner Hall ==
Fenner Hall was established in 1992 and houses 451 students. It is a self-catered college and provides communal kitchens and restrooms. The residents are a variety of undergraduate and international students. The college is named after Frank John Fenner (1914–2010) who specialised in the field of virology at the ANU and is a renowned Australian scientist. The original Fenner Hall building was located on Northbourne Avenue, however, was relocated to the newly developed Kambri Precinct at the heart of ANU in 2019.

== Graduate House ==
Graduate House was first established in 1971 and has around 150 graduate student residents.

== John XXIII College ==
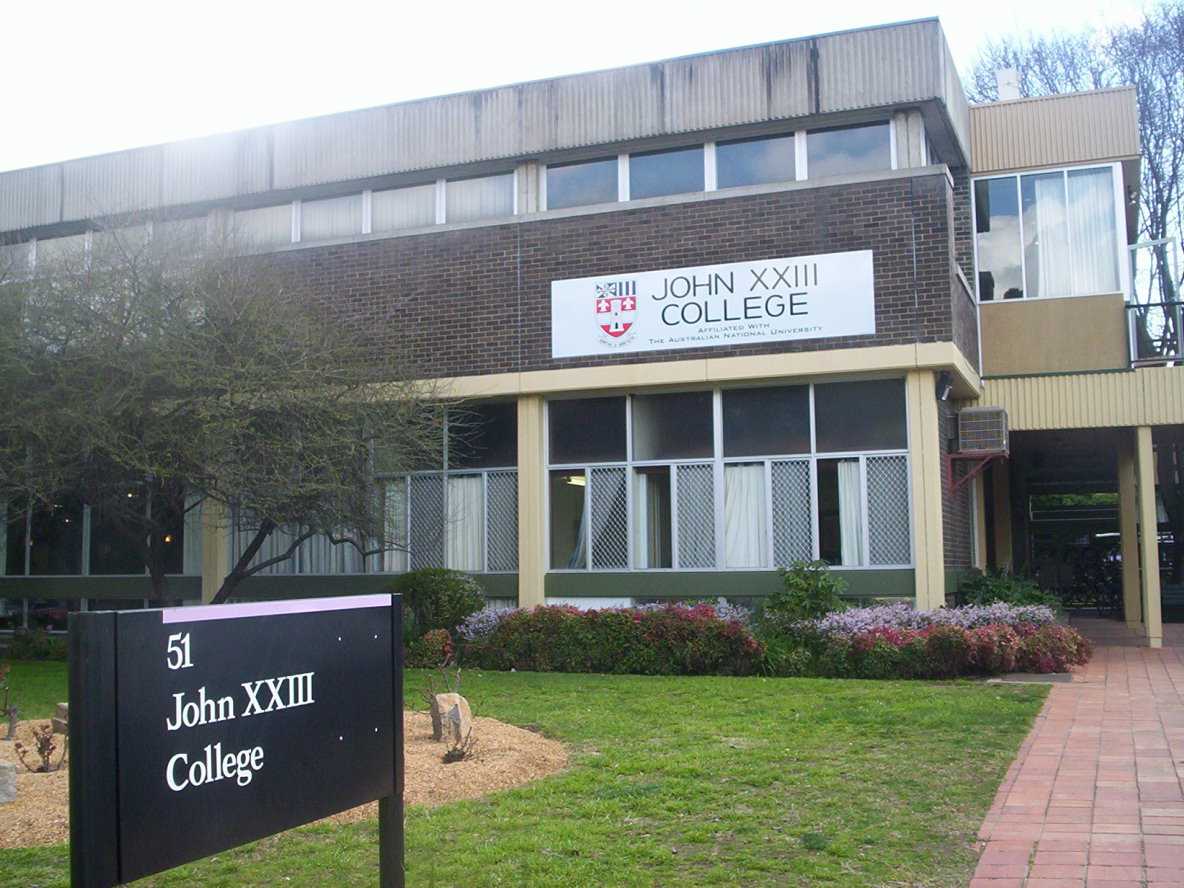
John XXIII College

John XXIII College is an independent hall of residence for 320 undergraduate students, named after Pope John XXIII and was established in 1967.

== Ursula Hall ==
Ursula Hall is a catered residential hall. The hall was founded as an all-female institution in 1968 by the Ursuline Order. In 1971 it became a co-educational college. In 2004, Ursula College became known as Ursula Hall. Notable alumni of the Ursula Hall include Barry O'Farrell who was president of the residents committee.

== Wright Hall ==
Wright Hall is a flexi catered residential hall. It opened to students in 2019 and houses over 400 students. It sits on the western end of University Avenue, next to Bruce Hall. The creation of Wright Hall was announced in 2016, when Louise and Graham Tuckwell announced a $100 million plan to build Wright Hall and a new Bruce Hall. Wright is Louise Tuckwell's maiden name, and so the hall is named after Louise's ancestors. These ancestors include convicts sent to Australia on the First and Second Fleet. Wright Hall's motto is "Tenacitas, Comitas, Gratia," which translates to “get on with it, get on with each other and be grateful.”

== Wamburun Hall ==
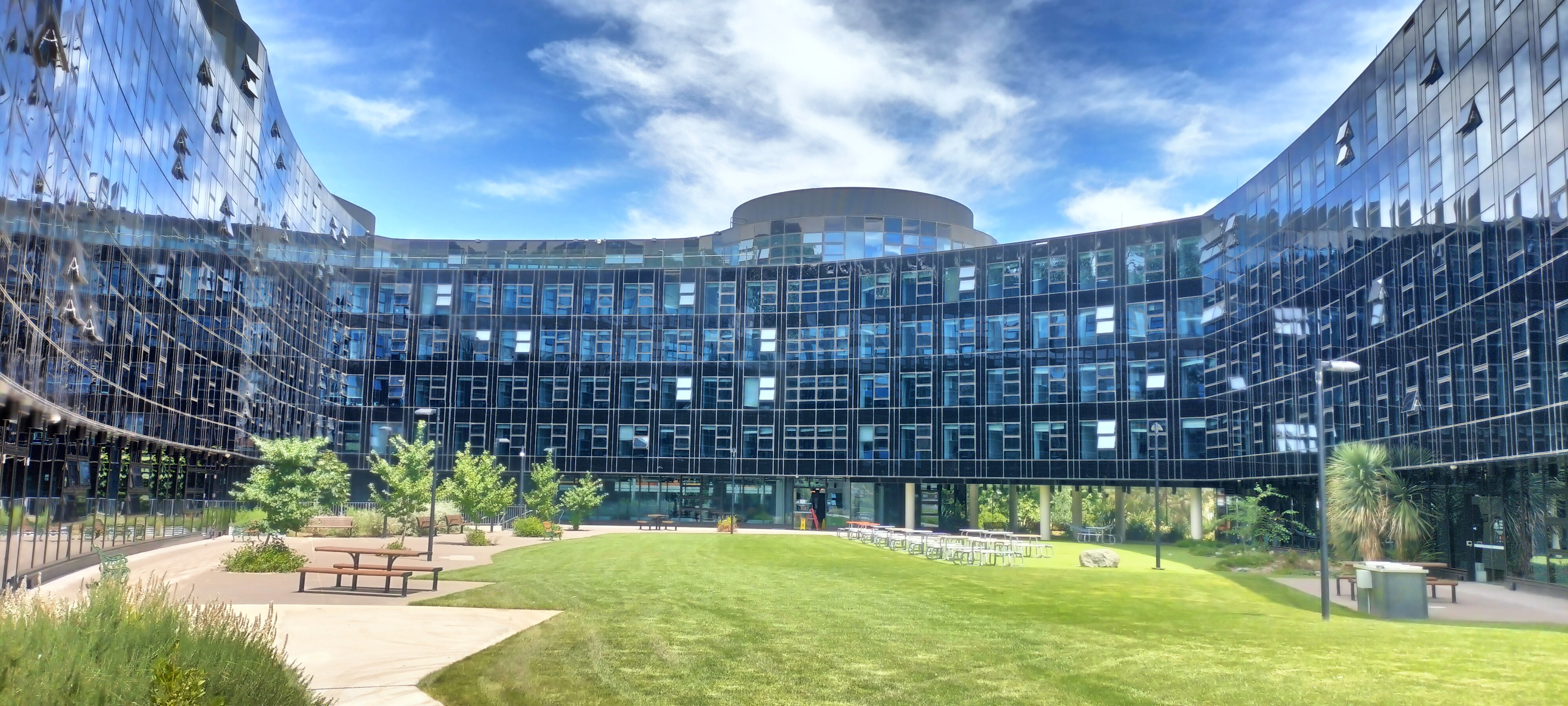
Wamburun Hall quad

Wamburun Hall is a self-catered residential hall. It was established in 2019 and houses approximately 500 students. It occupies a building previously used by the residents of Bruce Hall, facing Black Mountain on one side and the southern part of the ANU campus on the other. The Hall provides a large communal kitchen with dining areas, where students can cook individually or in groups. There is a communal laundry with washing machines and dryers, common spaces like the Cage, the Nest, and the Quad. In the Cage, there are movie theatres, music rooms complete with a drum kit, guitars, and a piano, as well as an art room, a computer lab, and a large common room where events are commonly hosted. The sunny Quad in the middle of the building features shared community garden beds, and is a great place to eat meals, catch up with friends, read, or play backyard cricket and football. Lastly, the Nest is a fifth-floor sky lounge with a Café and a bar ran by the students living at Wamburun. All residents have the opportunity to participate in interhall social, arts and sports programs and a program of events presented by the residential community and the Hall. The name comes from the Ngunnawal word for large black cockatoo and was given to the Hall in 2018.

== Yukeembruk Village ==
Yukeembruk Village is a self-catered residential hall. It was established in 2023 and houses approximately 700 undergraduate and postgraduate students, where there are 536 beds with shared bathrooms, 195 en-suite rooms and 'Masterchef' style kitchens in all buildings. Built on the southwest corner of the ANU campus, it faces Black Mountain and Sullivans Creek with views of lake Burley Griffin. The residential buildings are built around a large common house, complete with bike storage facilities, basketball court, and a common green, creating a village community. The name came from the word Yibaay-maliyan Yukeembruk (Eaglehawk and Crow) are the two main totems and totemic class system of the Canberra (Ngambri) region. The members of the Walgalu (Ngambri/Ngurmal) and Ngarigu (Currawang/Moolinggoolah) nations belongs within the nation to one of two classes or sections, which were inherited through the mother.

Yukeembruk faced multiple issues in its first semester of operation including lack of functioning washing machines and dryers.
