= Pope John XXIII High School =

Pope John XXIII High School is the name of several high schools in the United States:

- Saint John XXIII High School, formerly Pope John XXIII High School, Greater Katy, Harris County, Texas
- Pope John XXIII Regional High School, Sparta, New Jersey
- Pope John XXIII Central Catholic High School, Elgin, Nebraska
- Pope John XXIII High School (Everett, Massachusetts)
