= Bruce Baird =

Australian politician (1942–2026)

The Honourable Bruce Baird AM
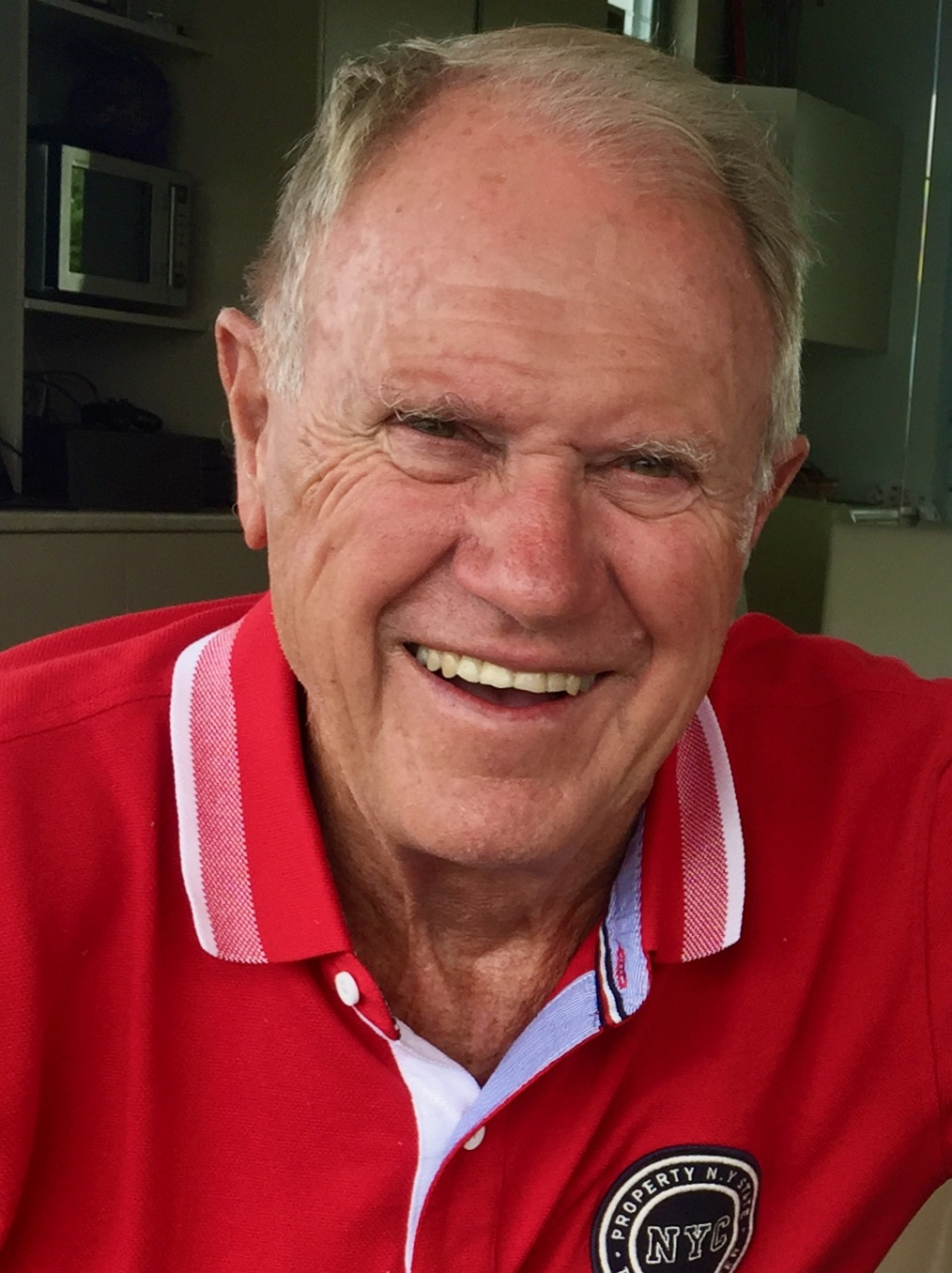
- Baird in 2017

Member of the Australian Parliament for Cook
- In office 3 October 1998 – 17 October 2007
- Preceded by: Stephen Mutch
- Succeeded by: Scott Morrison
NSW Minister 1988–1995
Minister for Transport
In office 25 March 1988 – 4 April 1995
Premier	Nick Greiner; John Fahey
Preceded by	Terry Sheahan
Succeeded by	Brian Langton
Minister for Roads
In office 26 May 1993 – 4 April 1995
Premier	John Fahey
Preceded by	Wal Murray
Succeeded by	Michael Knight
Minister for Tourism
In office 3 July 1992 – 26 May 1993
Premier	John Fahey
Preceded by	Robert Webster
Succeeded by	Virginia Chadwick
Minister for Environment
In office 24 June 1992 – 3 July 1992
Premier	John Fahey
Preceded by	Tim Moore
Succeeded by	Chris Hartcher
Minister Assisting the Premier and Assisting the Treasurer
In office 24 July 1990 – 6 June 1991

Deputy Leader of the New South Wales Liberal Party
- In office 1992–1994
- Preceded by: Peter Collins
- Succeeded by: Kerry Chikarovski

Member of the New South Wales Parliament for Northcott
- In office 24 March 1984 – 1995
- Preceded by: Jim Cameron
- Succeeded by: Barry O'Farrell

Personal details
- Born: Bruce George Baird; 28 February 1942 Sydney, New South Wales, Australia
- Died: 2 October 2026 (aged 84) Singapore
- Party: Liberal
- Children: 3, including Julia Baird and Mike Baird
- Education: University of Sydney; University of Melbourne
- Occupation: Politician, trade commissioner

Bruce George Baird (28 February 1942 – 2 October 2026) was an Australian politician. A member of the Liberal Party, he represented Northcott in the New South Wales Legislative Assembly from 1984 to 1995 and Cook in the Australian House of Representatives from 1998 to 2007. He was Minister for Transport in New South Wales from 1988 to 1995 and deputy leader of the New South Wales Liberal Party from 1992 to 1994.

== Early life and education ==
Baird was born on 28 February 1942. He grew up in Cronulla, where his father owned the local shoe store. He was educated at Winston College, Cronulla Public School and Sutherland Intermediate High School. After leaving school, he joined Qantas as an executive trainee and, while working in its booking offices, completed a Bachelor of Arts at the University of Sydney, majoring in psychology. He subsequently attempted to become an Anglican priest but failed the medical exam due to a kidney condition. Baird instead pursued a career in commerce, earning a master's degree in business administration from the University of Melbourne.

== Career ==
=== 1972–1984: Before politics ===
Baird was Assistant Trade Commissioner at the Australian Embassy in Bonn, West Germany, from 1972 to 1976. He was then Trade Commissioner at the Australian Consulate-General in New York from 1977 to 1980. He was also Government Affairs Manager for Esso Australia from 1980 to 1984.

=== 1984–1995: State politics ===
Baird was elected as a member for the electorate of Northcott in the New South Wales Legislative Assembly in 1984. He was appointed Shadow Minister for Transport and Finance in May 1986. Following the election of the Greiner Government in 1988, he was appointed Minister for Transport. He was later appointed Minister for Sydney's Olympic Bid from 1990 to 1993. When Greiner resigned in 1992, Baird contested the Liberal leadership but lost the party room ballot to John Fahey. He was elected deputy leader of the NSW Liberal Party in 1992 and held the position until 1994. He also served as Minister for Tourism from 1992 to 1993 and as Minister for Roads from 1993 to 1995.

=== 1995–1998: Between parliaments ===
After leaving state parliament, Baird was managing director of the Tourism Council of Australia from 1995 to 1998 and chairman of the National Rail Corporation from 1997 to 1998.

=== 1998–2007: Federal politics ===
Baird was a Liberal member of the Australian House of Representatives from October 1998 to October 2007, representing the electorate of Cook, New South Wales. He chaired the House of Representatives Standing Committee on Economics, Finance and Public Administration from 2004 to 2007, and chaired the parliamentary group Amnesty International from 2000. Baird along with fellow Liberal MPs Petro Georgiou, Russell Broadbent and Judi Moylan opposed mandatory detention of asylum seekers. In June 2005 the four MPs negotiated with Prime Minister John Howard over proposals to change the detention system. The resulting agreement provided for families with children to move into community accommodation and for the Commonwealth Ombudsman to review cases of detention exceeding two years, while retaining mandatory detention.

Despite having been a former deputy leader of the NSW Liberal Party, Baird never served as a minister during his time in Federal Parliament. In 2007, journalist Phillip Coorey attributed his lack of promotion under Howard to his moderate political views and support for Peter Costello.

He had secured Liberal preselection for Cook before the 1998 election as a compromise candidate after the sitting member, Stephen Mutch, who had Howard's support, lost the support of local party members.

Sensing he would not be promoted by Howard, in 2004, Baird sought the Liberal nomination for Speaker, but David Hawker was chosen as the Government's candidate instead.

In April 2007, he announced that he would retire at the next election. Michael Towke initially won Liberal preselection, polling 82 votes to Scott Morrison's eight in the first ballot. After adverse media coverage, a second ballot selected Morrison, who went on to win the seat.

==== Aviation policy ====
Baird chaired the parliamentary Friends of Tourism group. His electorate included many Qantas employees, and he had known the airline's chief executive, Geoff Dixon, since they worked at the Australian consulate in New York. In The Chairman's Lounge (2024), journalist Joe Aston, who worked in Baird's office in 2006, wrote that Baird was known, "only half jokingly", as "the member for Qantas". Aston also wrote that Baird sought complimentary upgrades for himself, his family and staff, and assisted parliamentary colleagues with their travel arrangements.

In 2005 and 2006, Baird lobbied against allowing Singapore Airlines to compete with Qantas on routes between Australia and the United States. He argued that increased competition could cost Australian jobs and threaten regional services. He said that Singapore Airlines benefited from government support and that access should not be granted without reciprocal benefits for Australia.

After a private-equity consortium proposed a takeover of Qantas in 2006, Baird questioned whether the airline should retain protection from foreign competitors if it became a multinational business. During the Airline Partners Australia bid in 2007, he sought commitments to preserve Australian jobs, regional services and Qantas's full-service operations. In March he welcomed undertakings negotiated by the government, but in April he called for further scrutiny after details emerged of the consortium's plans to increase the airline's debt and withdraw funds from it.

=== 2008–2026: After politics ===
Baird was appointed Chairman of the Tourism and Transport Forum, a peak industry lobby group, in 2008. In the same year, he was also appointed chair of the Refugee Resettlement Advisory Council, which advises the Australian government on resettling refugees in Australia. In August 2009, Baird was appointed to review the Education Services for Overseas Students Act 2000. His final report, Stronger, simpler, smarter ESOS: supporting international students, recommended stronger registration requirements for education providers, a consistent approach to assessing risk, and financial penalties for a wider range of breaches.

He was the inaugural chairman of the National Heavy Vehicle Regulator, serving from 2012 until October 2018. In 2014, he became a patron of the Asylum Seekers Centre, a not-for-profit that provides personal and practical support to people seeking asylum in Australia. In September 2017, he became chairman of Business Events Sydney. Baird also sat on the boards of the National Apology Foundation, the Heart Research Institute, the Sydney Opera House, Screen Producers Australia, Cubic Transportation Systems, and served on the strategic council of the Blueprint Institute.

== Personal life and death ==
Baird married Judy Woodlands on 15 August 1964. Their children are Steve Baird, who became chief executive officer of International Justice Mission Australia in 2020; Julia Baird, columnist with the Sydney Morning Herald and former host of the ABC News program The Drum; and Mike Baird, former chief executive officer of HammondCare, and previously the Premier of New South Wales from 2014 to 2017. Judy was diagnosed with a degenerative neurological condition later in life; she died in 2021.

Baird died on 2 October 2026, at the age of 84, in Singapore while returning from an overseas trip in Europe.

== Honours ==
In 2010 on Australia Day, Baird was appointed a Member of the Order of Australia for service to the Parliament of Australia, and to the community of New South Wales through a range of business, tourism and welfare organisations.

New South Wales Legislative Assembly
Preceded by Jim Cameron	Member for Northcott; 1984–1995	Succeeded by Barry O'Farrell
Political offices
Preceded by Terry Sheahan	Minister for Transport; 1988–1995	Succeeded by Brian Langton
Preceded by Tim Moore	Minister for the Environment; 1992	Succeeded by Chris Hartcher
Preceded by Robert Webster	Minister for Tourism; 1992–1993	Succeeded by Virginia Chadwick
Preceded by Wal Murray	Minister for Roads; 1993–1995	Succeeded by Michael Knight
Party political offices
Preceded by Peter Collins	Deputy Leader of the New South Wales Liberal Party; 1992–1994	Succeeded by Kerry Chikarovski
Parliament of Australia
Preceded by Stephen Mutch	Member for Cook; 1998–2007	Succeeded by Scott Morrison
