= Electoral district of Northcott =

Former state electoral district of New South Wales, Australia

Northcott was an electoral district of the Legislative Assembly in the Australian state of New South Wales between 1968 and 1999.

== History ==
It was named after Sir John Northcott who served as Governor of New South Wales from 1 August 1946 to 1 August 1957. Northcott was the first Australian appointed to a State vice-regal position.

It was represented by Jim Cameron, Bruce Baird, and Barry O'Farrell, all of whom served as Deputy Leaders of their party, although in O'Farrell's case he became Deputy Liberal leader after moving to Ku-ring-gai following Northcott's abolition.

O'Farrell succeeded Baird in Northcott in 1995. Ironically when O'Farrell resigned as NSW Premier in 2014 he was succeeded by Baird's son Mike. Bruce Baird himself had failed to become Premier to succeed Nick Greiner in 1992 which eventually led to Baird's retirement from Northcott in 1995 and then enabled O'Farrell to succeed him in the seat. Northcott marked the beginning of O'Farrell's tenure in the New South Wales Parliament and his eventual path in becoming Premier, a premiership that ended when O'Farrell was succeeded by Mike Baird, the son of O'Farrell's Northcott predecessor.

== Members for Northcott ==
Member	Party	Period
Jim Cameron	Liberal	1968–1983
Jim Cameron	Call to Australia	1983–1984
Bruce Baird	Liberal	1984–1995
Barry O'Farrell	Liberal	1995–1999

== Election results ==
1995 New South Wales state election: Northcott
Party	Candidate	Votes	%	±%
Liberal	Barry O'Farrell	20,747	60.1	−7.9
Labor	Andrew Leigh	8,178	23.7	+6.4
Democrats	Suzanne Reddy	3,589	10.4	−1.0
AAFI	Steve Van Wyk	2,034	5.9	+5.9
Total formal votes		34,548	96.5	+3.3
Informal votes		1,243	3.5	−3.3
Turnout		35,791	93.2	
Two-party-preferred result
Liberal	Barry O'Farrell	22,657	68.6	−7.8
Labor	Andrew Leigh	10,358	31.4	+7.8
Liberal hold		Swing	−7.8	
