= Jim Cameron (politician) =

Australian politician

24th Speaker of the New South Wales Legislative Assembly
- In office 4 December 1973 – 24 May 1976
- Preceded by: Sir Kevin Ellis
- Succeeded by: Laurie Kelly

Member of the New South Wales Legislative Assembly for Northcott
- In office 24 February 1968 – 5 March 1984
- Preceded by: New district
- Succeeded by: Bruce Baird

Member of the New South Wales Legislative Council
- In office 30 April 1984 – 30 October 1984
- Preceded by: Fred Duncan
- Succeeded by: Marie Bignold

Personal details
- Born: James Alexander Cameron; 9 November 1930 Coraki, New South Wales, Australia
- Died: 19 January 2002 (aged 71) Avoca Beach, New South Wales, Australia
- Political party: Liberal Party (until 1984); Call to Australia (after 1984)
- Spouse: Helen Bicket
- Relations: Ross Cameron (son)
- Children: 6

James Alexander Cameron (9 November 1930 – 19 January 2002) was an Australian politician. He was born at Coraki, New South Wales, the son of blacksmith Donald Cameron and Joyce Betheras. In 1948, when he was eighteen years old, he joined the Liberal Party and became a staff member. He was press secretary to Liberal leaders Pat Morton and Robert Askin 1955 – 1959. On 16 March 1963, he married Helen Bicket, with whom he had two daughters and four sons.

In 1968, Cameron was elected to the New South Wales Legislative Assembly as the Liberal member for Northcott. In 1973, he was appointed Speaker of the Legislative Assembly, holding the position until 1976. He was Deputy Leader of the Liberal Party and Deputy Opposition Leader for five months in 1981. He left the Assembly in 1984 to contest the Legislative Council for Fred Nile's Call to Australia group, which later became the Christian Democratic Party. He was successful, but six months later was forced to resign after a serious heart attack. Marie Bignold was appointed as his replacement. Despite having been the only MLC to vote against the Human Tissues Bill, which included provision for heart transplants, he required one himself after his heart attack. Cameron died at Avoca Beach in 2002.

One of his sons, Ross Cameron, is a former Liberal member for the federal seat of Parramatta.

New South Wales Legislative Assembly
New district	Member for Northcott; 1968–1984	Succeeded by Bruce Baird
Preceded by Sir Kevin Ellis	Speaker of the New South Wales Legislative Assembly; 1973–1976	Succeeded by Laurie Kelly
New South Wales Legislative Council
Preceded by Fred Duncan	Member of the New South Wales Legislative Council; 1984	Succeeded by Marie Bignold
Party political offices
Preceded by Bruce McDonald	Deputy Leader of the New South Wales Liberal Party; 1981	Succeeded by Kevin Rozzoli
