= Marie Bignold =

Australian politician (1927–2018)

Member of the New South Wales Legislative Council
- In office 5 December 1984 – 1 July 1991

Personal details
- Party: Marie Bignold Team (after 1991)
- Other political affiliations: Call to Australia (before 1988); Independent (1988-1991)

Marie May Bignold (14 September 1927 – 11 October 2018) was an Australian politician. Born in Kiama, the daughter of solicitor Owen James Thomas and Sylvia May Reid, she studied law at the University of Sydney before being admitted as a solicitor in 1950. She married Justice Neal Bignold, a Judge of the Land and Environment Court of New South Wales, with whom she has one daughter, Alicia.

In 1984, she was appointed to the New South Wales Legislative Council for the Call to Australia Group, which was led by Fred Nile. Her appointment was the result of the resignation, due to ill health, of fellow party member Jim Cameron. She was the first female lawyer to take her seat in the Legislative Council. A committed Christian, she campaigned strongly against abortion. She was expelled from Call to Australia in November 1988 after a disagreement with the Niles over industrial relations policy. She thereafter held her seat as an independent Member until 1991, when she was one of three sitting Members whose seats were abolished by a Government sponsored Constitutional Amendment Bill which received majority approval at a Referendum held in conjunction with the 1991 General Election. Her legal challenge to the validity of that Bill was unsuccessful in the Courts. Thereafter she did not seek re-election to the Legislative Council.

At the 1991 state election, the Marie Bignold Team received 0.5% of the upper house vote. Bignold later ran in the 1992 Gordon state by-election and received 6.42% of the vote.
