= John Jobling =

Australian politician (1937–2022)

John Hughes Jobling AM (21 April 1937 – 7 April 2022) was an Australian politician. He was born in Sydney, the son of John Young Jobling and Elizabeth Marjorie Hughes. His marriage to Carole Linde Chadwick on 15 August 1960 produced two daughters and a son.

He attended The Scots College 1950–1953, Sydney Boys High School 1954, and the University of Sydney 1956–1960, after which he became a pharmacist. He was active in the local community, as a member of Scone and Muswellbrook Apex from 1961 to 1964, and various other community organisations including the Returned Serviceman's League and the Royal Prince Alfred Yacht Club. He joined the Liberal Party in 1968, in which year he was elected to Muswellbrook Municipality Shire Council. He was Deputy Mayor from 1971 to 1974 and Mayor from 1974 until 1984. In 1977 he was awarded the Queen Elizabeth II Silver Jubilee Medal.

In 1984, Jobling was elected to the New South Wales Legislative Council for the Liberal Party. As an MLC, he served as Government Whip from 1988 to 1995 and Opposition Whip following the Liberals' defeat in 1995 until his retirement in 2003. He was awarded the National Medal and Bar for service to State Emergency Services in 1988. In 2004 Jobling was awarded a Medal of the Order of Australia, and in 2021 this was upgraded to an appointment as Member.
