= Judy Jakins =

Australian politician

Judith Helen Jakins AM (née Penzer; 8 February 1940 – 23 February 2023) was an Australian politician. She was a Nationals member of the New South Wales Legislative Council from 1984 to 1991.

The daughter of Robert Strahorn Penzer and his wife Kathleen, she was born in Bourke, New South Wales. She worked as a nurse and later a grazier, and served from 1976 to 1982 as secretary of the Nationals Bourke branch, moving to the Dubbo branch in 1983. She was chairwoman of the state electoral council for the seat of Broken Hill from 1980 to 1982, and was on The Nationals Party Central Council from 1980 to 1984. In 1984, she became the first woman elected to represent The Nationals in New South Wales when she won a seat on the New South Wales Legislative Council, which she held until 1991.

After leaving the council, Jakins served on Dubbo City Council from 1991 to 1995. She was on the Zoological Parks Board of New South Wales from 1992–95 and the Board of the Royal Flying Doctor Service from 1993–2001. In 2000 she was honoured as a Paul Harris Fellow for Services to the Community and Rotary International, and in 2003 she received a Dubbo City Council Award for services to the community.
