= Keith Enderbury =

Australian politician

Keith James Enderbury (26 April 1935 – 15 August 2000) was an Australian politician. He was a Labor member of the New South Wales Legislative Council from 1984 to 1995.

Enderbury was born in Bankstown, and worked as a storeman and photo engraver. He was on national service from 1953 to 1955, and joined the Labor Party in 1976, becoming an organiser. He contested the state electorate of Byron that year, unsuccessfully. In 1984 he was elected to the New South Wales Legislative Council, becoming Opposition Whip in 1989. He retired from the Council in 1995.

Enderbury died on 15 August 2000 at the Concord Hospital Burns Unit, following injuries inflicted by his son Christiaan Douglas Enderbury who suffered from mental illness. In 2002 Christiaan was found not guilty on the grounds of mental illness.
