= Richard Bull (Australian politician) =

Australian politician (born 1946)

Richard Thomas Marshall Bull (born 14 December 1946) is a former Australian politician. The son of federal National Party Senator Tom Bull and his wife Jessie, he was a farmer and grazier at Narrandera and Holbrook. On 12 March 1970 he married Patricia Anne Jeffreys; they have three daughters and a son.

Bull joined the Young Country Party and was its inaugural state chairman in 1965. From 1983 to 1984 he was on the National Party's central executive, and served as campaign director in various state and federal election campaigns from 1977. In 1984, he was elected to the New South Wales Legislative Council. He served as National Party leader in the Legislative Council and was also Shadow Minister for Agriculture, Gaming and Racing from 1995. He resigned from the Council in 2000 and was succeeded by Rick Colless.
