= John Hannaford (Australian politician) =

Australian politician

John Planta Hannaford AM (born 21 January 1949) is a former Australian politician. Born in Goulburn, the son of William Henry Planta and Amy Frances Hannaford, he became a lawyer, having studied at the Australian National University in Canberra. He commenced legal articles in 1971. On 6 April 1974 he married Denise Lorraine Thorburn. They have a daughter and two sons.

Hannaford was a member of the Liberal Party, having held many positions including Regional President, State Executive member, Chairman of State Convention and Chairman of the Constitution Standing Committee. In April 1984, he was elected to the New South Wales Legislative Council. Hannaford played a leading role in the establishment of the Legislative Council's standing committee system in 1988. From 1988–1990 he chaired the Council's Standing Committee on State Development. On 7 May 1997, Hannaford successfully moved to establish Legislative Council General Purpose Standing Committees, modelled on the Senate system.

In 1990 Hannaford was appointed Minister for State Development, moving to Health and Community Services in 1991 and Attorney-General and Industrial Relations in 1992. Later that year, he was also appointed Vice-President of the Executive Council. In 1993 he swapped Industrial Relations for Justice and remained Attorney-General until 3 March 1995. He was Leader of the Government in the Legislative Council from 22 October 1992 to 3 March 1995, and was leader of the Opposition in the Legislative Council following the Labor Party's win at the 1995 state election from 11 April 1995 to 29 March 1999. Hannaford resigned from Parliament on 10 October 2000 and was replaced by Greg Pearce.

Political offices
Preceded by Peter Collins	Minister for Health (New South Wales); 1991–1992	Succeeded by Ron Phillips
Preceded by Peter Collins	Attorney-General of New South Wales; 1992–1995	Succeeded by Jeff Shaw
