= Judith Walker =

Australian politician

Judith Mary Walker (17 May 1938 – 13 March 2001) was an Australian politician. She was a Labor member of the New South Wales Legislative Council from 1984 to 1995.

== Biography ==
Walker was born in Summer Hill and was educated at St Mary's Catholic Primary School in Concord. She worked in the insurance industry for twenty years, becoming state secretary of the Australian Insurance Employees Union. She was ousted as union secretary in 1984 amidst allegations of misbehaviour, but was reinstated in 1985 after a battle in the Federal Court. An active member of the Labor Party, she held various positions including President of the Alexandria branch, vice-president of the New South Wales Labor Council, and vice-president of the Kingsford-Smith Federal Electoral Council.

In 1984 she was appointed to the Legislative Council, where she served until 1995. Walker died in 2001 at Umina.
