= Mick Ibbett =

Australian politician

Gordon Raymond "Mick" Ibbett (16 October 1927 – 17 July 2008) was an Australian politician. He was a Labor member of the New South Wales Legislative Council from 1984 to 1991.

Ibbett was born in Redfern, New South Wales, and worked as a toolmaker. Early in life he joined the Labor Party and the Amalgamated Metal Workers Union. In 1960, he was elected to Sydney City Council for Northcott Ward, serving until 1967 and again for Waterloo Ward from 1982 to 1984. From 1969 to 1974 he was a member of South Sydney Municipal Council and was Deputy Mayor from 1969 to 1972. In 1984, he was elected to the New South Wales Legislative Council, serving until 1991.
