= Jim Samios =

Australian politician (1933–2011)

James Miltiades Samios (10 September 1933 – 20 July 2011) was an Australian politician. Born in Brisbane, Queensland, he was educated at the Anglican Church Grammar School. Samios became a lawyer in Brisbane and a member of the Commonwealth Attorney General's Department, which took him to Canberra and then Sydney. He married Rosemary Nicolson, with whom he had one son. Samios served in the RAAF 1953–1954 and was an officer in the General Reserve in 1963. He was also a director of St Basil's Homes and a founding director of the Museum of Contemporary Art.

A member of the Liberal Party, Samios was elected to the New South Wales Legislative Council in 1984. He was a parliamentary secretary from 1988 until 1995 (when the Liberal-National Coalition lost power to the Labor Party). From 1995 until 2003, he was deputy leader of the Liberal Party in the council. He retired before the 2003 state election.
