= Electoral results for the district of Pittwater =

Election results for Pittwater, New South Wales, Australia

Pittwater, an electoral district of the Legislative Assembly in the Australian state of New South Wales, was created in 1973, replacing a large part of Collaroy and elections have generally been won by the Liberal party.

== Members for Pittwater ==
Election	Member	Party
1973	Sir Robert Askin	Liberal
1975 by	Bruce Webster	Liberal
1976	Bruce Webster	Liberal
1978	Max Smith	Liberal
1981	Max Smith	Liberal
1984	Max Smith	Liberal
1986 by	Jim Longley	Liberal
1988	Jim Longley	Liberal
1991	Jim Longley	Liberal
1995	Jim Longley	Liberal
1996 by	John Brogden	Liberal
1999	John Brogden	Liberal
2003	John Brogden	Liberal
2005 by	Alex McTaggart	Independent
2007	Rob Stokes	Liberal
2011	Rob Stokes	Liberal
2015	Rob Stokes	Liberal
2019	Rob Stokes	Liberal
2023	Rory Amon	Liberal
2024 by	Jacqui Scruby	Independent

== Election results ==
=== Elections in the 2020s ===
==== 2024 by-election ====
2024 Pittwater state by-election
Party	Candidate	Votes	%	±%
Independent	Jacqui Scruby	25,705	54.17	+18.31
Liberal	Georgia Ryburn	19,852	41.84	−2.87
Libertarian	Doug Rennie	1,893	3.99	+3.99
Total formal votes		47,450	97.43	−0.32
Informal votes		1,250	2.57	+0.32
Turnout		48,700	85.15	−5.01
Two-candidate-preferred result
Independent	Jacqui Scruby	26,050	55.94	+6.60
Liberal	Georgia Ryburn	20,519	44.06	−6.60
Independent gain from Liberal		Swing	−6.60	

==== 2023 ====
2023 New South Wales state election: Pittwater
Party	Candidate	Votes	%	±%
Liberal	Rory Amon	22,137	44.71	−12.64
Independent	Jacqui Scruby	17,754	35.86	+35.86
Labor	Jeffrey Quinn	5,039	10.18	−2.38
Greens	Hilary Green	3,386	6.84	−8.47
Sustainable Australia	Craig Law	1,195	2.41	−1.32
Total formal votes		49,511	97.75	+0.42
Informal votes		1,139	2.25	−0.42
Turnout		50,650	90.16	+0.27
Notional two-party-preferred count
Liberal	Rory Amon	26,796	63.25	−9.11
Labor	Jeffrey Quinn	15,567	36.75	+9.11
Two-candidate-preferred result
Liberal	Rory Amon	23,365	50.66	−20.18
Independent	Jacqui Scruby	22,759	49.34	+49.34
Liberal hold				

=== Elections in the 2010s ===
==== 2019 ====
2019 New South Wales state election: Pittwater
Party	Candidate	Votes	%	±%
Liberal	Rob Stokes	28,170	57.35	−10.41
Greens	Miranda Korzy	7,518	15.31	−0.79
Labor	Jared Turkington	6,168	12.56	−0.20
Sustainable Australia	Suzanne Daly	1,832	3.73	+3.73
Keep Sydney Open	Michael Newman	1,644	3.35	+3.35
Animal Justice	Natalie Matkovic	1,417	2.88	+2.88
Conservatives	Stacey Mitchell	1,283	2.61	+2.61
Independent	Stewart Matthews	1,087	2.21	+2.21
Total formal votes		49,119	97.33	−0.24
Informal votes		1,346	2.67	+0.24
Turnout		50,465	89.89	−1.43
Two-party-preferred result
Liberal	Rob Stokes	30,070	72.36	−5.53
Labor	Jared Turkington	11,486	27.64	+5.53
Two-candidate-preferred result
Liberal	Rob Stokes	29,696	70.84	−4.81
Greens	Miranda Korzy	12,225	29.16	+4.81
Liberal hold		Swing	−4.81	

==== 2015 ====
2015 New South Wales state election: Pittwater
Party	Candidate	Votes	%	±%
Liberal	Rob Stokes	32,761	67.8	−4.2
Greens	Felicity Davis	7,780	16.1	−0.7
Labor	Kieren Ash	6,167	12.8	+3.8
Christian Democrats	Zoran Curcic	886	1.8	−0.4
No Land Tax	Rebecca Arduca	751	1.6	+1.6
Total formal votes		48,345	97.6	+0.3
Informal votes		1,202	2.4	−0.3
Turnout		49,547	91.3	+2.1
Notional two-party-preferred count
Liberal	Rob Stokes	34,015	77.9	−6.6
Labor	Kieren Ash	9,653	22.1	+6.6
Two-candidate-preferred result
Liberal	Rob Stokes	33,706	75.7	−2.3
Greens	Felicity Davis	10,847	24.4	+2.3
Liberal hold		Swing	−2.3	

==== 2011 ====
2011 New South Wales state election: Pittwater
Party	Candidate	Votes	%	±%
Liberal	Rob Stokes	32,225	72.0	+21.7
Greens	Jonathan King	7,536	16.8	+7.1
Labor	Pat Boydell	4,023	9.0	+1.6
Christian Democrats	Mark McFarlane	986	2.2	−1.1
Total formal votes		44,770	97.7	−0.1
Informal votes		1,048	2.3	+0.1
Turnout		45,818	92.8	
Notional two-party-preferred count
Liberal	Rob Stokes	34,060	84.5	+4.7
Labor	Pat Boydell	6,244	15.5	−4.7
Two-candidate-preferred result
Liberal	Rob Stokes	33,180	78.0	+18.6
Greens	Jonathan King	9,366	22.0	+22.0
Liberal hold		Swing	+18.6	

=== Elections in the 2000s ===
==== 2007 ====
2007 New South Wales state election: Pittwater
Party	Candidate	Votes	%	±%
Liberal	Rob Stokes	20,807	50.3	−10.0
Independent	Alex McTaggart	11,107	26.9	+26.9
Greens	Craige McWhirter	4,039	9.8	−4.3
Labor	Pat Boydell	3,046	7.4	−11.6
Christian Democrats	Patricia Giles	1,350	3.3	+0.5
Against Further Immigration	Charles Byrne	648	1.6	+0.2
Democrats	Mario Nicotra	363	0.9	−1.3
Total formal votes		41,360	97.8	−0.2
Informal votes		912	2.2	+0.2
Turnout		42,272	92.3	
Notional two-party-preferred count
Liberal	Rob Stokes	24,654	79.8	+9.6
Labor	Pat Boydell	6,256	20.2	−9.6
Two-candidate-preferred result
Liberal	Rob Stokes	22,109	59.4	−10.7
Independent	Alex McTaggart	15,123	40.6	+40.6
Liberal hold		Swing	−10.7 (Note: Pittwater was won by an Independent in a 2005 by-election and the shown swing is based on the 2003 election when it was won by the Liberals.)	

==== 2005 by-election ====
2005 Pittwater by-election Saturday 26 November
Party	Candidate	Votes	%	±%
Independent	Alex McTaggart	15,052	39.23	+39.23
Liberal	Paul Nicolaou	14,622	38.11	−22.16
Christian Democrats	Patricia Giles	3,208	8.36	+5.54
Greens	Natalie Stevens	2,819	7.35	−6.73
Independent	Robert Dunn	2,316	6.04	+6.04
Democrats	Mario Nicotra	348	0.91	−1.29
Total formal votes		38,365	98.13	+0.06
Informal votes		730	1.87	−0.06
Turnout		39,095	85.20	−5.98
Two-candidate-preferred result
Independent	Alex McTaggart	19,683	55.36	+55.36
Liberal	Paul Nicolaou	15,869	44.64	−25.47
Independent gain from Liberal		Swing	N/A	

John Brogden (Liberal) resigned.

==== 2003 ====
2003 New South Wales state election: Pittwater
Party	Candidate	Votes	%	±%
Liberal	John Brogden	24,601	60.3	+8.3
Labor	Ben Carpentier	7,738	19.0	−0.7
Greens	Hunter Walters	5,749	14.1	+7.6
Christian Democrats	Andrew Amos	1,150	2.8	+0.1
Democrats	Jane Rowe	897	2.2	−9.5
Against Further Immigration	George Atkinson	579	1.4	+0.3
Unity	Hue Lee	103	0.3	+0.3
Total formal votes		40,817	98.1	+0.2
Informal votes		805	1.9	−0.2
Turnout		41,622	91.2	
Two-party-preferred result
Liberal	John Brogden	26,065	70.1	+1.3
Labor	Ben Carpentier	11,110	29.9	−1.3
Liberal hold		Swing	+1.3	

=== Elections in the 1990s ===
==== 1999 ====
1999 New South Wales state election: Pittwater
Party	Candidate	Votes	%	±%
Liberal	John Brogden	20,918	52.0	−8.5
Labor	Pat Boydell	7,938	19.7	−0.1
Democrats	Vicki Dimond	4,719	11.7	+7.3
Greens	Trevor Ockenden	2,604	6.5	−3.8
One Nation	Peter Cuthbertson	1,955	4.9	+4.9
Christian Democrats	Rick Bristow	1,088	2.7	−0.3
Against Further Immigration	Paul Whitmore	436	1.1	+0.6
Earthsave	Adrian Sonza	414	1.0	+1.0
Non-Custodial Parents	Peter Vlug	135	0.3	+0.3
Total formal votes		40,207	97.8	+1.7
Informal votes		897	2.2	−1.7
Turnout		41,104	92.1	
Two-party-preferred result
Liberal	John Brogden	23,201	68.8	−1.5
Labor	Pat Boydell	10,523	31.2	+1.5
Liberal hold		Swing	−1.5	

==== 1996 by-election ====
1996 Pittwater by-election Saturday 25 May
Party	Candidate	Votes	%	±%
Liberal	John Brogden	16,772	50.38	−10.56
Democrats	Vicki Dimond	4,694	14.10	+9.79
Labor	Gary Sargent	4,429	13.30	−5.72
Against Further Immigration	Janey Woodger	2,502	7.52	+7.52
Greens	Chris Cairns	2,344	7.04	−4.10
Independent	Gerard Smith	1,591	4.78	
Call to Australia	Rick Bristow	960	2.88	−0.19
Total formal votes		33,292	98.38	+2.23
Informal votes		548	1.62	−2.23
Turnout		33,840	83.38	−10.20
Two-candidate-preferred result
Liberal	John Brogden	19,346	65.02	−5.81
Democrats	Vicki Dimond	10,409	34.98	+34.98
Liberal hold		Swing	−5.81	

Jim Longley (Liberal) resigned.

==== 1995 ====
1995 New South Wales state election: Pittwater
Party	Candidate	Votes	%	±%
Liberal	Jim Longley	21,244	60.9	−5.4
Labor	Gary Sargent	6,631	19.0	+1.5
Greens	Chris Cairns	3,882	11.1	+11.1
Democrats	Peter Baker	1,503	4.3	−11.9
Call to Australia	Rick Bristow	1,070	3.1	+3.1
Independent	Ian Pash	532	1.5	+1.5
Total formal votes		34,862	96.1	+4.9
Informal votes		1,397	3.9	−4.9
Turnout		36,259	93.6	
Two-party-preferred result
Liberal	Jim Longley	23,381	70.8	−2.6
Labor	Gary Sargent	9,631	29.2	+2.6
Liberal hold		Swing	−2.6	

==== 1991 ====
1991 New South Wales state election: Pittwater
Party	Candidate	Votes	%	±%
Liberal	Jim Longley	20,893	66.3	+10.2
Labor	Garry Sargent	5,515	17.5	+1.2
Democrats	David Plumb	5,108	16.2	+13.5
Total formal votes		31,516	91.2	−5.7
Informal votes		3,036	8.8	+5.7
Turnout		34,552	92.4	
Two-party-preferred result
Liberal	Jim Longley	22,150	73.4	+1.1
Labor	Garry Sargent	8,008	26.6	−1.1
Liberal hold		Swing	+1.1	

=== Elections in the 1980s ===
==== 1988 ====
1988 New South Wales state election: Pittwater
Party	Candidate	Votes	%	±%
Liberal	Jim Longley	16,952	56.5	−2.2
Independent	Eric Green	7,640	25.5	+25.5
Labor	Anthony Britt	4,280	14.3	−12.8
Democrats	Graeme MacLennan	905	3.0	−1.1
Independent	Ronald Jamieson	235	0.8	+0.8
Total formal votes		30,012	97.1	−0.7
Informal votes		896	2.9	+0.7
Turnout		30,908	92.5	
Two-candidate-preferred result
Liberal	Jim Longley	17,424	60.1	−6.0
Independent	Eric Green	11,559	39.9	+39.9
Liberal hold		Swing	−6.0	

==== 1986 by-election ====
1986 Pittwater by-election Saturday 31 May
Party	Candidate	Votes	%	±%
Liberal	Jim Longley	10,922	42.8	−15.3
Independent	Nat Young	6,177	24.2	+24.2
Independent	Robert Grace	5,006	19.6	+19.6
Call to Australia	Mark Donnelly	1,451	5.7	+5.7
Democrats	Graeme MacLennan	1,290	4.9	+0.7
Nuclear Disarmament	Virginia Rigney	643	2.5	+2.5
Independent	Brett Monk	62	0.2	+0.2
Total formal votes		25,501	97.5	−0.3
Informal votes		649	2.5	+0.3
Turnout		26,105	78.0 (Note: Estimate based on a roll of 33,533 at the 1984 election.)	
Two-party-preferred result
Liberal	Jim Longley	13,000	53.1	−12.4
Independent	Nat Young	11,468	46.9	+46.9
Liberal hold		Swing	−12.4	

Liberal MP Max Smith resigned.

==== 1984 ====
1984 New South Wales state election: Pittwater
Party	Candidate	Votes	%	±%
Liberal	Max Smith	17,452	58.1	−2.8
Labor	Denise Morgan	8,290	27.6	−11.5
Independent	John Webeck	3,035	10.1	+10.1
Democrats	Graeme MacLennan	1,249	4.2	+4.2
Total formal votes		30,026	97.8	+1.6
Informal votes		661	2.2	−1.6
Turnout		30,687	91.5	+3.1
Two-party-preferred result
Liberal	Max Smith		65.5	+4.6
Labor	Denise Morgan		34.5	−4.6
Liberal hold		Swing	+4.6	

==== 1981 ====
1981 New South Wales state election: Pittwater
Party	Candidate	Votes	%	±%
Liberal	Max Smith	16,910	60.9	+14.9
Labor	Patrick Sewell	10,872	39.1	−1.5
Total formal votes		27,782	96.2	
Informal votes		1,087	3.8	
Turnout		28,869	88.4	
Liberal hold		Swing	+9.5	

=== Elections in the 1970s ===
==== 1978 ====
1978 New South Wales state election: Pittwater
Party	Candidate	Votes	%	±%
Liberal	Max Smith	12,707	46.0	−15.2
Labor	Charles Wild	11,220	40.6	+10.8
Independent	John Webeck	2,924	10.6	+10.6
Democrats	Kerry Warr	777	2.8	+2.8
Total formal votes		27,628	97.3	−1.4
Informal votes		764	2.7	+1.4
Turnout		28,392	90.2	−1.8
Two-party-preferred result
Liberal	Max Smith	14,205	51.4	−13.8
Labor	Charles Wild	13,423	48.6	+13.8
Liberal hold		Swing	−13.8	

==== 1976 ====
1976 New South Wales state election: Pittwater
Party	Candidate	Votes	%	±%
Liberal	Bruce Webster	16,798	61.2	−2.8
Labor	Charles Wild	8,176	29.8	+0.3
Workers	John Booth	1,982	7.2	+7.2
Independent	Peter Middlebrook	473	1.7	+1.7
Total formal votes		27,429	98.7	+1.1
Informal votes		368	1.3	−1.1
Turnout		27,797	92.0	+1.4
Two-party-preferred result
Liberal	Bruce Webster	17,871	65.2	−4.0
Labor	Charles Wild	9,558	34.8	+4.0
Liberal hold		Swing	−4.0	

==== 1975 by-election ====
1975 Pittwater state by-election
Party	Candidate	Votes	%	±%
Liberal	Bruce Webster	13,701	63.0	−1.0
Australia	Richard Jones	5,009	26.0	
Independent	Geoff Woodhouse	3,026	13.9	
Total formal votes		21,736	98.1	+0.5
Informal votes		414	1.9	−0.5
Turnout		22,150	77.1	13.5
Liberal hold		Swing		

Sir Robert Askin (Liberal) resigned.

==== 1973 ====
1973 New South Wales state election: Pittwater
Party	Candidate	Votes	%	±%
Liberal	Robert Askin	15,522	64.0	+2.0
Labor	Dorothy Jeffery	7,144	29.5	+29.5
Democratic Labor	Kevin Lee	1,583	6.5	+0.3
Total formal votes		24,249	97.6	
Informal votes		607	2.4	
Turnout		24,856	90.6	
Two-party-preferred result
Liberal	Robert Askin	16,788	69.2	−1.4
Labor	Dorothy Jeffery	7,461	30.8	+1.4
Liberal notional hold		Swing	−1.4	

Pittwater was a new seat with a notional Liberal majority.
