= Narrabeen Sports High School =

Location
- Namona Street and Pittwater Road, North Narrabeen, Northern Beaches, Sydney, New South Wales; Australia; 33°42′3″S 151°17′51″E

Information
- Former names: Narrabeen Girls' High School; Narrabeen Boys' High School; Narrabeen High School
- Type: Government-funded co-educational comprehensive and specialist secondary day school
- Motto: Purpose and Integrity
- Established: 2 February 1954; 72 years ago (as Narrabeen Girls' High School); 1959; 67 years ago (Narrabeen Boys' High School); 1976; 50 years ago {(as Narrabeen High School); 2000; 26 years ago (as Narrabeen Sports High School)
- School district: The Beaches
- Educational authority: New South Wales Department of Education
- Specialist: Sports school
- Principal: Heidi Currie
- Years: 7–12
- Enrolment: 850 (2018)
- Campus type: Suburban
- Colours: Royal blue and white
- Affiliation: NSW Sports High School Association
- Website: narrabeen-h.schools.nsw.gov.au

Narrabeen Sports High School (abbreviated as NSHS) is a government-funded co-educational comprehensive and specialist secondary day school, with speciality in sports, located on Namona Street and Pittwater Road, in North Narrabeen, in the northern beaches region of Sydney, New South Wales, Australia.

Established as Narrabeen Girls' High School and in 1959 as Narrabeen Boys' High School, the schools merged in 1976 to form Narrabeen High School; and then, in 2000, became the first specialist sports high school in New South Wales as Narrabeen Sports High School. The school caters for approximately 850 students from Year 7 to Year 12. The school is operated by the New South Wales Department of Education; the principal is Heidi Currie.

Narrabeen Sports High School is a member of the NSW Sports High Schools Association.

== History ==
Narrabeen Sports High School began with the establishment of Narrabeen Girls' High School in North Narrabeen, which was opened on 2 February 1954. In 1959, Narrabeen Boys' High School, located adjacent to the girls school, was established. The official opening of Narrabeen Boys was conducted in October 1962 by Robert Askin, then the Leader of the NSW Opposition and the Member for Collaroy. The Narrabeen Boys' High School motto was the Latin: Enitere ad finem, which translated as "Strive to the end". The Girls' High School motto was the Latin: Facta non verba, translated as "Deeds not words".

There was a fire in the girls' assembly hall in the early 1970s as well as fires in the boys' school. Following damage to the boys' school in the early 1970s, it was decided to merge the boys' and girls' schools to form a new co-educational high school for the area. This was one of many reasons to amalgamate the schools. Cromer High School was also being built and the numbers at the school would halve. The Government of New South Wales decided against the amalgamation and it was only due to a strike by students and parents that the schools were merged and upgraded. The merger had always been planned, both schools were supposedly temporary with a few permanent buildings built in the 1960s and 1970s. These buildings still stand as of 2019. Thus, the schools merged in 1976 to form Narrabeen High School and most of the school buildings date from this time.

The altered badge of Narrabeen Boys' was adopted, although the motto was also changed to read "Purpose and Integrity". By the 1990s, the school had generated a reputation for sporting excellence and the decision was made to re-form the school into the state's first specialist sports high school, which was done by the end of 2000. In 2008, Narrabeen Sports High became a member of the Peninsula Community of Schools group. As of 2022, the principal is Heidi Currie.

== Sports offered and facilities ==
The Narrabeen Sports High School operates a talented sports development program across the following sports: athletics, Australian rules football, basketball, baseball, boxing, cricket, dance, golf, netball, rugby league, rugby union, soccer (affiliated with the Sydney FC), swimming, squash, tennis, touch football, triathlon, and wrestling.

Located between Narrabeen Beach and Narrabeen Lakes and surrounded by playing fields, the Narrabeen Sports High School is able to access the adjacent facilities of the Sydney Academy of Sport. The school's sporting facilities include a full-sized gymnasium, fitness laboratory, dance studio, tennis courts, and a hall for public performances.

== Notable alumni ==
=== Narrabeen High/Sports High ===
- Cherie Burton – former politician who represented Kogarah
- Pek Cowan – rugby union player
- Laura Enever – surfer; competed in the World Surf League
- Daniel Gartner – rugby league player
- Mark Gerrard – rugby union player
- Jim Longley – former politician who represented Pittwater
- Baz Luhrmann – film director, screenwriter, and producer
- Steve Menzies – rugby league player
- Scott Miller – swimmer; represented Australia at the 1996 Summer Olympics
- Chris Payne – soccer player in the A-League
- Craig Pearce – actor and writer
- Sebastian Ryall – soccer player in the A-League
- Josh Valentine – rugby union player
- Rodney van Buizen – baseball player; represented Australia at the 2004 Summer Olympics
- Rouben Vesmadian – basketball player
- Anthony Watmough – rugby league player

=== Narrabeen Boys High ===
- John Alexander OAM – former tennis player; member of the Australian Davis Cup team; politician who represents Bennelong
- Mark Anderson – swimmer; represented Australia at the 1968 Summer Olympics
- Simon Anderson – surfer; creator of the "thruster" surfboard design
- Russel Gartner – rugby league player
- John Gibbs – rugby league player and media personality
- Peter Montgomery AM – former water polo player who represented Australia at the 1972 Munich, 1976 Montreal, 1980 Moscow, and 1984 Los Angeles Summer Olympics; sports administrator who served as the Vice President of the Australian Olympic Committee since 2001; lawyer
- Doug Parkinson – singer, actor, entertainer
- Phillip Smiles – former politician who represented Mosman and North Shore
- Nat Young – surfer; 1966 & 1970 World Surfing Champion; 1966, 1967 & 1969 Australian Surfing Champion; author

=== Narrabeen Girls High ===
- Marlena Jeffery – Spouse of a former Governor-General of Australia, Michael Jeffery
- Jenny Turrall – swimmer; represented Australia at the 1976 Olympics; Commonwealth Games; and former world record holder

== See also ==
- List of government schools in New South Wales
- Selective school (New South Wales)
- Education in Australia
