= 1996 Pittwater state by-election =

Election result for Pittwater, New South Wales, Australia

The 1996 Pittwater state by-election was held on 25 May 1996 for the New South Wales Legislative Assembly electorate of Pittwater following the retirement of sitting member, Jim Longley (Liberal).

On the same day, by-elections were held in the seats of Clarence, Orange, Southern Highlands and Strathfield.

All seats were retained by the Liberal-National parties, with the exception of Clarence. In Pittwater, the Liberal Party retained the seat despite a swing of 5.81% against them on a two-party preferred basis.

== Results ==
1996 Pittwater by-election Saturday 25 May
Party	Candidate	Votes	%	±%
Liberal	John Brogden	16,772	50.38	−10.56
Democrats	Vicki Dimond	4,694	14.10	+9.79
Labor	Gary Sargent	4,429	13.30	−5.72
AAFI	Janey Woodger	2,502	7.52	+7.52
Greens	Chris Cairns	2,344	7.04	−4.10
Independent	Gerard Smith	1,591	4.78	
Call to Australia	Rick Bristow	960	2.88	−0.19
Total formal votes		33,292	98.38	+2.23
Informal votes		548	1.62	−2.23
Turnout		33,840	83.38	−10.20
Two-candidate-preferred result
Liberal	John Brogden	19,346	65.02	−5.81
Democrats	Vicki Dimond	10,409	34.98	+34.98
Liberal hold		Swing	−5.81	

== See also ==
- Electoral results for the district of Pittwater
- List of New South Wales state by-elections
