= 1986 Pittwater state by-election =

Election result for Pittwater, New South Wales, Australia

A by-election was held for the New South Wales Legislative Assembly seat of Pittwater on 31 May 1986. It was triggered by the resignation of sitting Liberal MP Max Smith. The by-election was won by Liberal candidate Jim Longley.

== Background ==
Labor did not stand a candidate in the by-election, and as a result, this election was almost won by professional surfer and former world surfing champion Nat Young, who ran on a largely environmental ticket.

== Results ==
1986 Pittwater by-election Saturday 31 May
Party	Candidate	Votes	%	±%
Liberal	Jim Longley	10,922	42.8	−15.3
Independent	Nat Young	6,177	24.2	+24.2
Independent	Robert Grace	5,006	19.6	+19.6
Call to Australia	Mark Donnelly	1,451	5.7	+5.7
Democrats	Graeme MacLennan	1,290	4.9	+0.7
Nuclear Disarmament	Virginia Rigney	643	2.5	+2.5
Independent	Brett Monk	62	0.2	+0.2
Total formal votes		25,501	97.5	−0.3
Informal votes		649	2.5	+0.3
Turnout		26,105	78.0 (Note: Estimate based on a roll of 33,533 at the 1984 election.)	
Two-party-preferred result
Liberal	Jim Longley	13,000	53.1	−12.4
Independent	Nat Young	11,468	46.9	+46.9
Liberal hold		Swing	−12.4	

== See also ==
- Electoral results for the district of Pittwater
- List of New South Wales state by-elections
