= Olivetti Building (Sydney) =

Commercial building in Sydney, Australia

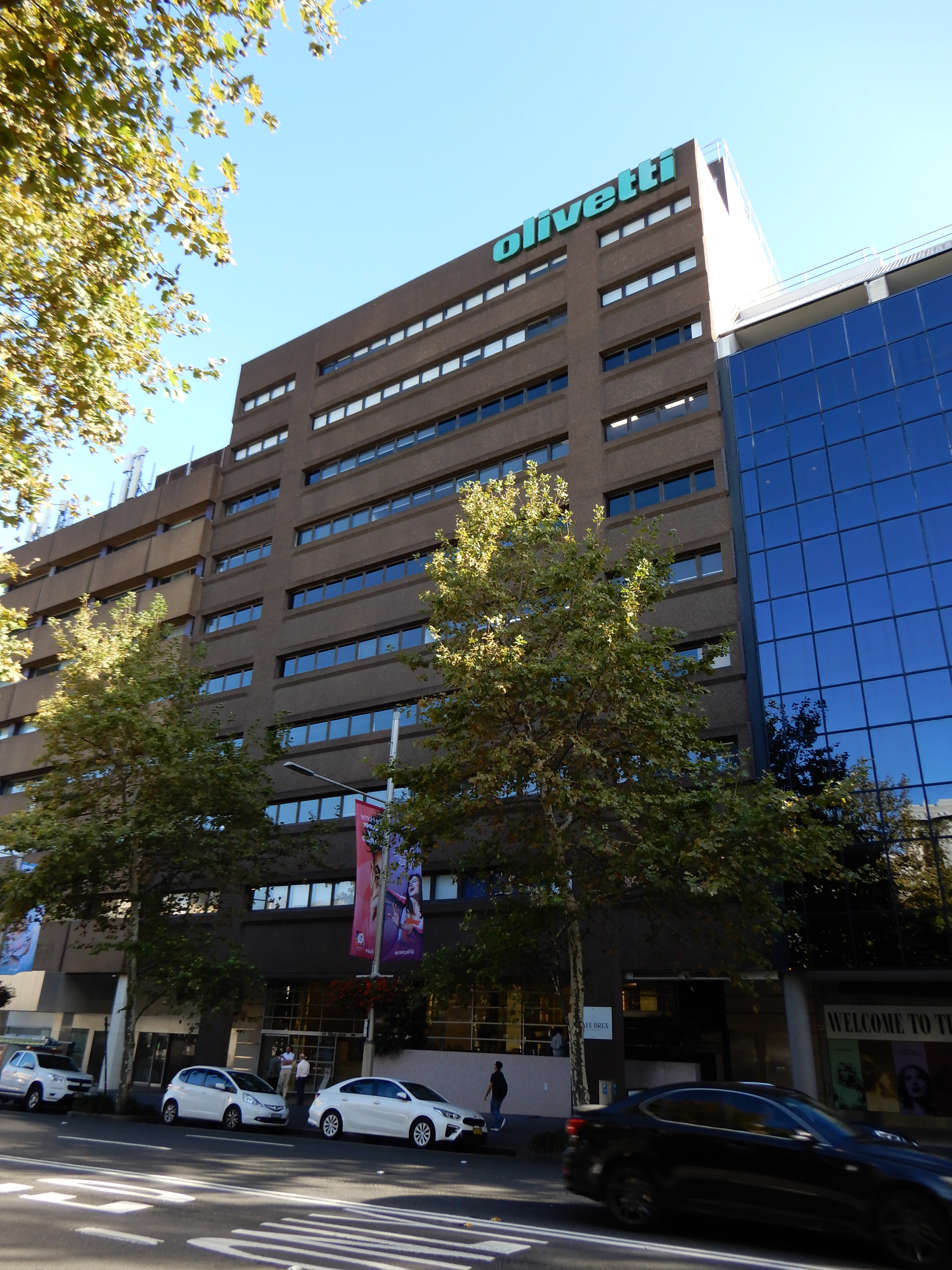
- Interactive map of the Olivetti Building area
- Alternative names: Olivetti House

General information
- Type: Commercial
- Location: Sydney, Australia
- Coordinates: 33.874328°S 151.218579°E
- Opening: 5 February 1973

The Olivetti Building (also known as the Olivetti House) is a brutalist commercial building in Sydney, Australia. The building consists of a ground level showroom, a lower-ground office and eight levels of offices, with a total floor space of 7,000 square metres.

== History ==
The building was constructed to house the offices of the Italian multinational company Olivetti in Australia. Designed by Summit Enterprises, it was officially inaugurated on February 5, 1973, by Sir Robert Askin, Premier of New South Wales.

In 1988 agreement for sale of the building for AUD$18 million was reached, but subsequently the deal fell through due to misrepresentations during the sale process. The building was sold for AUD$9.5 million in 1998.

== Description ==
Located at 140 William Street in Woolloomooloo, Sydney, the building features a brutalist style. It is characterised by its distinctive exposed aggregate concrete facade.

== Gallery ==
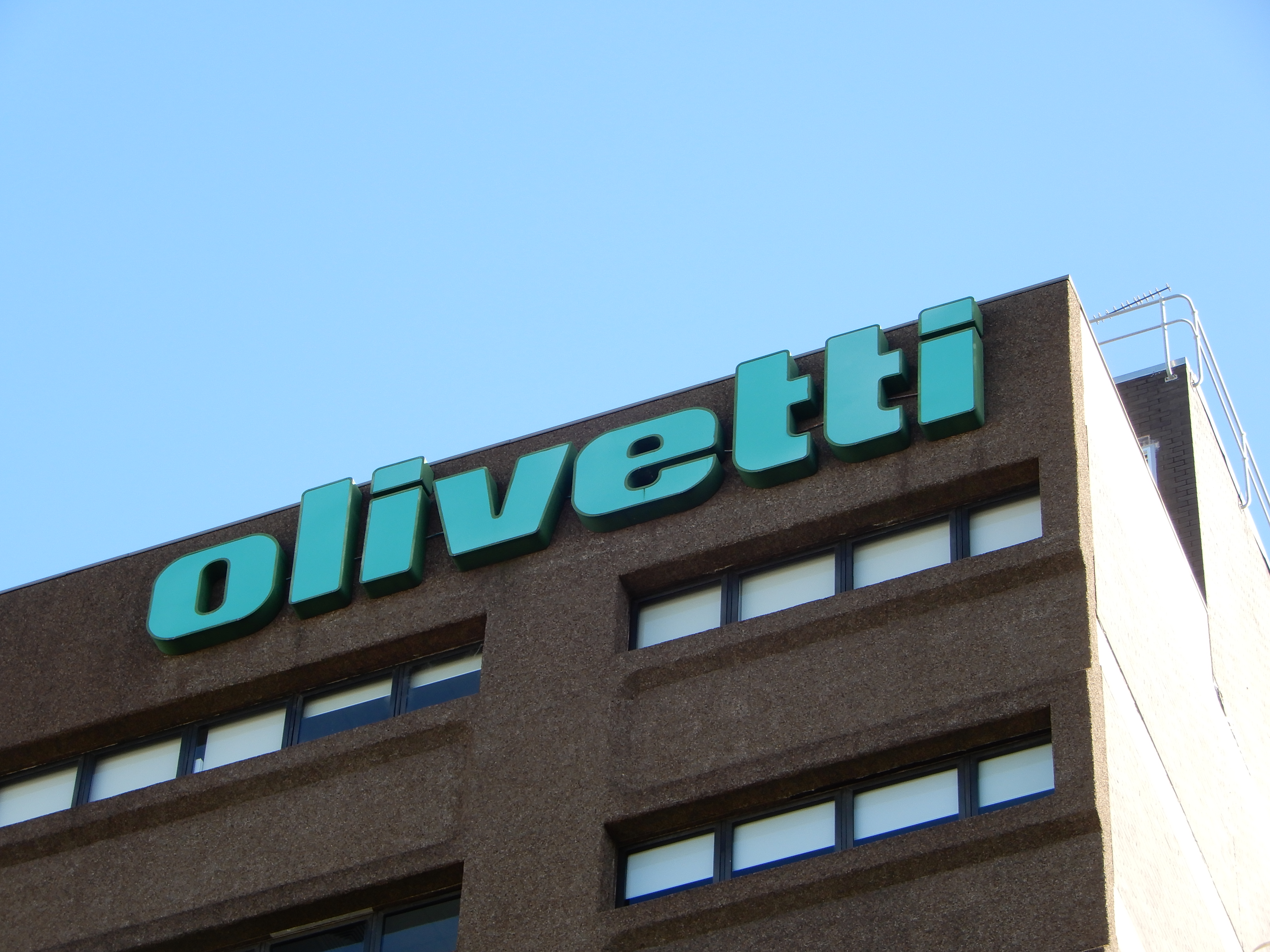

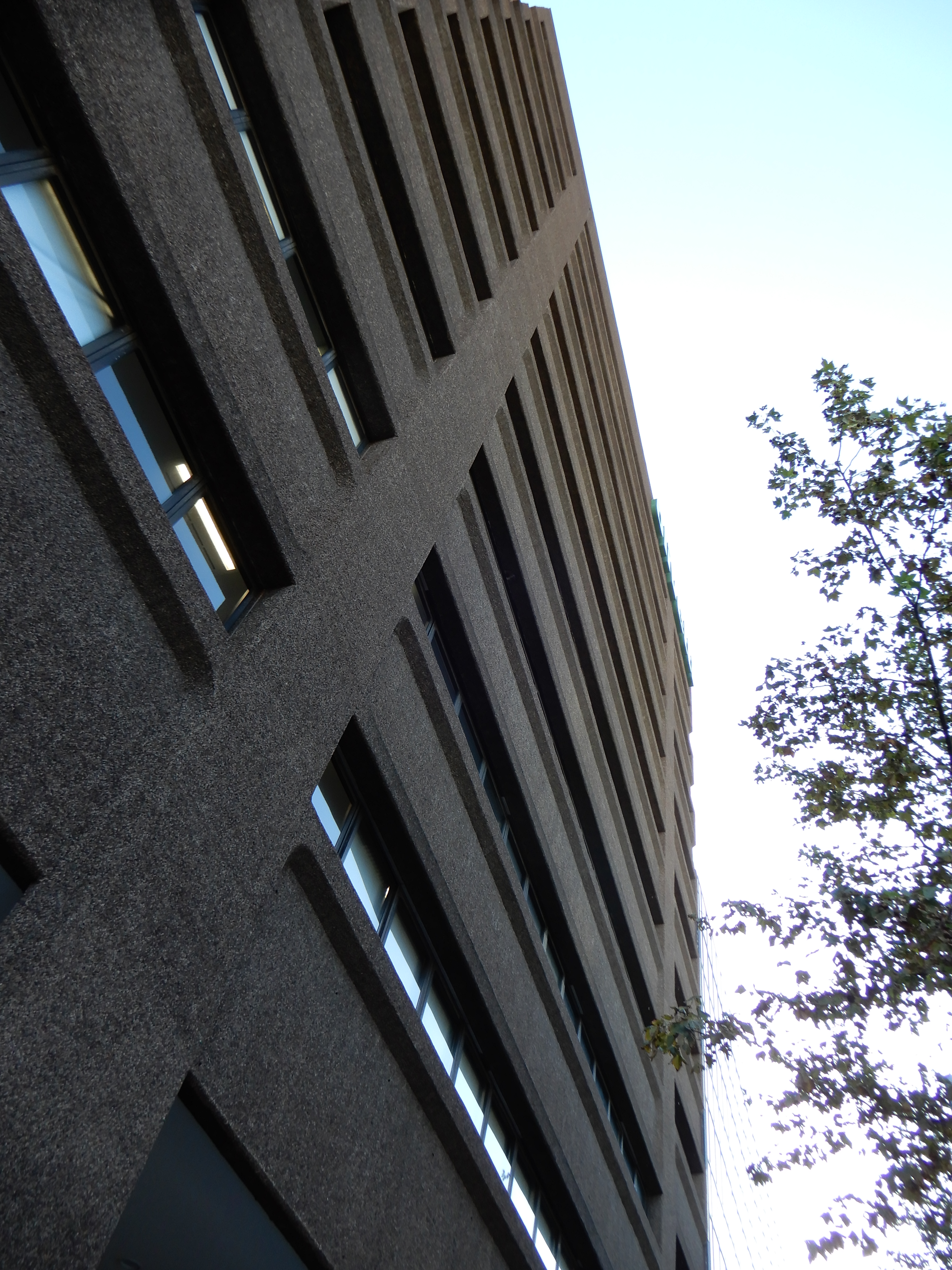

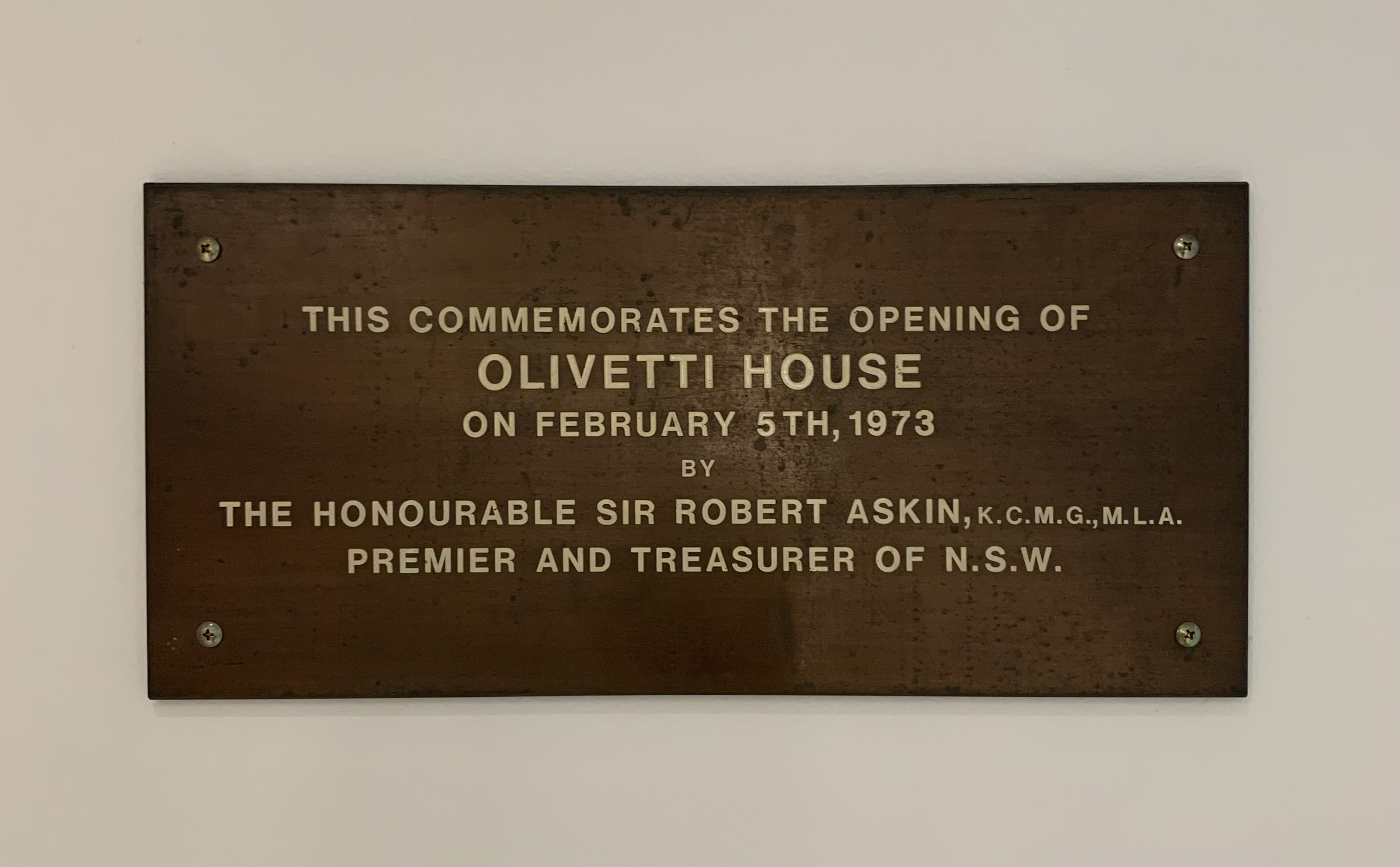
