= 1975 Pittwater state by-election =

- 8 February 1975

Electoral district of Pittwater in the New South Wales Legislative Assembly
	First party	Second party
		AUS
Candidate	Bruce Webster	Richard Jones
Party	Liberal	Australia
Primary vote	13,701	5,009
Percentage	63.0%	26.0%
Swing	▼1.0	▲26.0
MP before election
Robert Askin
Liberal
Elected MP
Bruce Webster
Liberal

A by-election was held for the New South Wales Legislative Assembly electorate of Pittwater on 8 February 1975. The election was triggered by the retirement of the Premier Sir Robert Askin (Liberal).

The Lane Cove by-election was held on the same day.

== Dates ==
Date	Event
3 January 1975	Sir Robert Askin resigned from parliament.
7 January 1975	Writ of election issued by the Speaker of the Legislative Assembly.
20 January 1975	Nominations
8 February 1975	Polling day
28 February 1975	Return of writ

== Results ==
1975 Pittwater state by-election
Party	Candidate	Votes	%	±%
Liberal	Bruce Webster	13,701	63.0	−1.0
Australia	Richard Jones	5,009	26.0	
Independent	Geoff Woodhouse	3,026	13.9	
Total formal votes		21,736	98.1	+0.5
Informal votes		414	1.9	−0.5
Turnout		22,150	77.1	13.5
Liberal hold				

The Labor Party did not contest the election.

== See also ==
- Electoral results for the district of Pittwater
- List of New South Wales state by-elections
