= 2024 Pittwater state by-election =

- 19 October 2024

Electoral district of Pittwater in the New South Wales Legislative Assembly
- Registered: 57,196
- Turnout: 85.15% (▼5.01 pp)
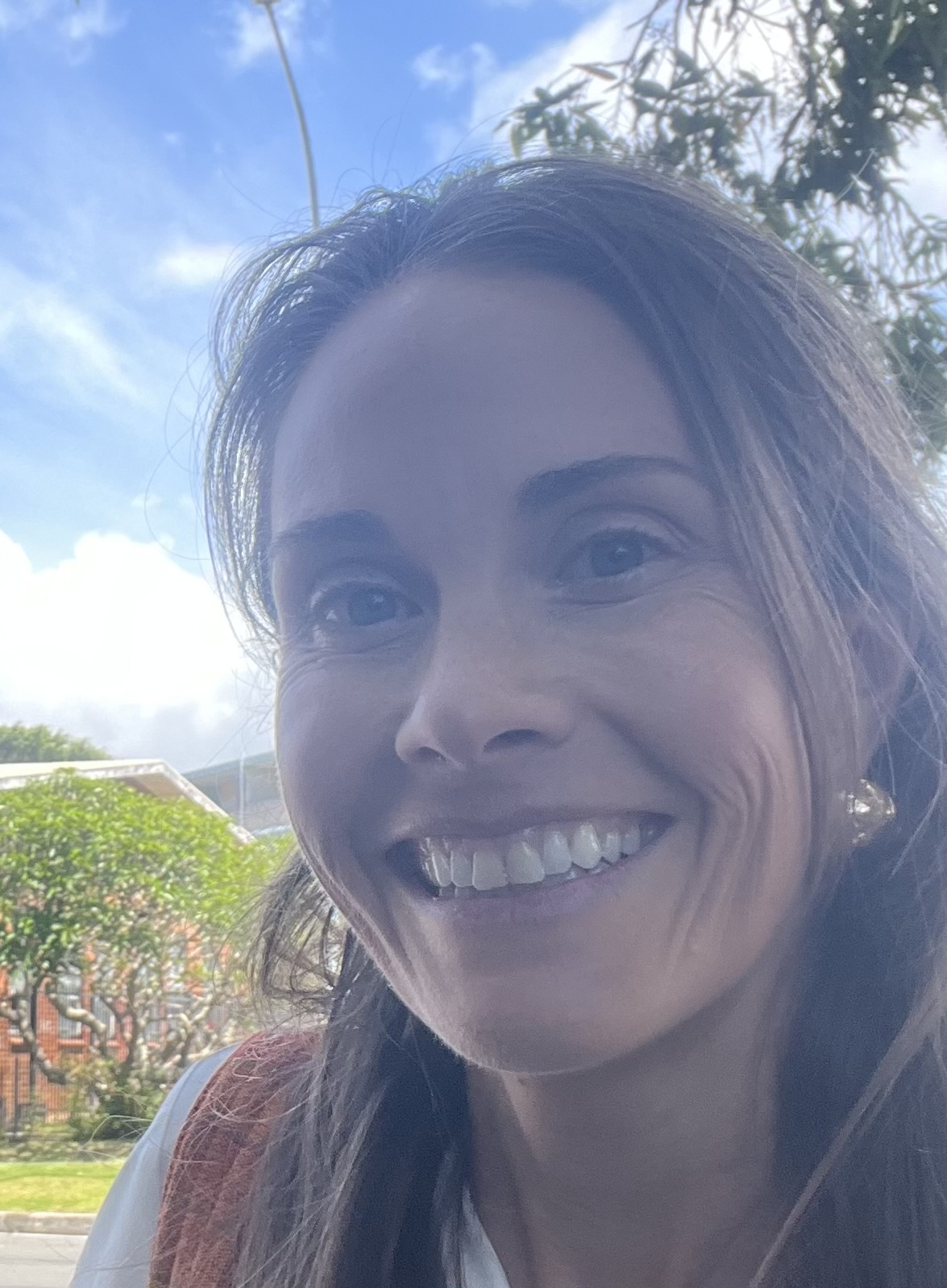

	First party	Second party
Candidate	Jacqui Scruby	Georgia Ryburn
Party	Independent	Liberal
Primary vote	25,705	19,852
Percentage	54.17%	41.84%
Swing	▲18.31	▼2.87
TCP	55.94%	44.06%
TCP swing	▲6.60	▼6.60
MP before election
Rory Amon
Liberal
Elected MP
Jacqui Scruby
Independent

A by-election for the New South Wales Legislative Assembly seat of Pittwater was held on 19 October 2024, following the resignation of Liberal MP Rory Amon.

Amon resigned from parliament on 30 August 2024 after he was charged with child sex offences. Several hours prior to resigning from parliament, Amon also resigned as a member of the Liberal Party.

Independent Jacqui Scruby was elected.

== Key dates ==
- Issue of writ – 27 September 2024
- Close of roll – 27 September 2024
- Close of nominations – 3 October 2024
- Declaration of nominations – 4 October 2024
- Commencement of early voting – 12 October 2024
- Applications for postal voting close – 14 October 2024
- Polling day – 19 October 2024
- Last day for return of the writ – 8 November 2024

== Previous results ==
2023 New South Wales state election: Pittwater
Party	Candidate	Votes	%	±%
Liberal	Rory Amon	22,137	44.71	−12.64
Independent	Jacqui Scruby	17,754	35.86	+35.86
Labor	Jeffrey Quinn	5,039	10.18	−2.38
Greens	Hilary Green	3,386	6.84	−8.47
Sustainable Australia	Craig Law	1,195	2.41	−1.32
Total formal votes		49,511	97.75	+0.42
Informal votes		1,139	2.25	−0.42
Turnout		50,650	90.16	+0.27
Notional two-party-preferred count
Liberal	Rory Amon	26,796	63.25	−9.11
Labor	Jeffrey Quinn	15,567	36.75	+9.11
Two-candidate-preferred result
Liberal	Rory Amon	23,365	50.66	−20.18
Independent	Jacqui Scruby	22,759	49.34	+49.34
Liberal hold				

== Candidates ==
Party	Candidate	Background
Libertarian	Doug Rennie	
Independent	Jacqui Scruby	Sustainability consultant and former environmental lawyer, former adviser for federal independent MPs Sophie Scamps and Zali Steggall.
Liberal	Georgia Ryburn	Former deputy mayor of Northern Beaches Council until 2024 and a senior manager at a professional services firm.

=== Liberal pre-selection ===
On 11 September 2024 Manly ward councillor Georgia Ryburn defeated fellow councillors Michael Gencher from Pittwater ward and Bianca Crvelin from Narrabeen ward along with lawyer Claire Longley to win Liberal Party preselection. Ryburn previously served as the deputy mayor of Northern Beaches Council, but was unable to contest the local government elections on 14 September after the Liberal Party missed the candidate nomination deadline.

=== Labor absence ===
The governing Labor Party did not contest the by-election with Premier Chris Minns stating "a swing against us would be a massive distraction".

== Results ==
2024 Pittwater state by-election
Party	Candidate	Votes	%	±%
Independent	Jacqui Scruby	25,705	54.17	+18.31
Liberal	Georgia Ryburn	19,852	41.84	−2.87
Libertarian	Doug Rennie	1,893	3.99	+3.99
Total formal votes		47,450	97.43	−0.32
Informal votes		1,250	2.57	+0.32
Turnout		48,700	85.15	−5.01
Two-candidate-preferred result
Independent	Jacqui Scruby	26,050	55.94	+6.60
Liberal	Georgia Ryburn	20,519	44.06	−6.60
Independent gain from Liberal		Swing	−6.60	

== See also ==
- Electoral results for the district of Pittwater
- 2024 Hornsby state by-election (same day election)
- 2024 Epping state by-election (same day election)
