= North Narrabeen =

- Suburb
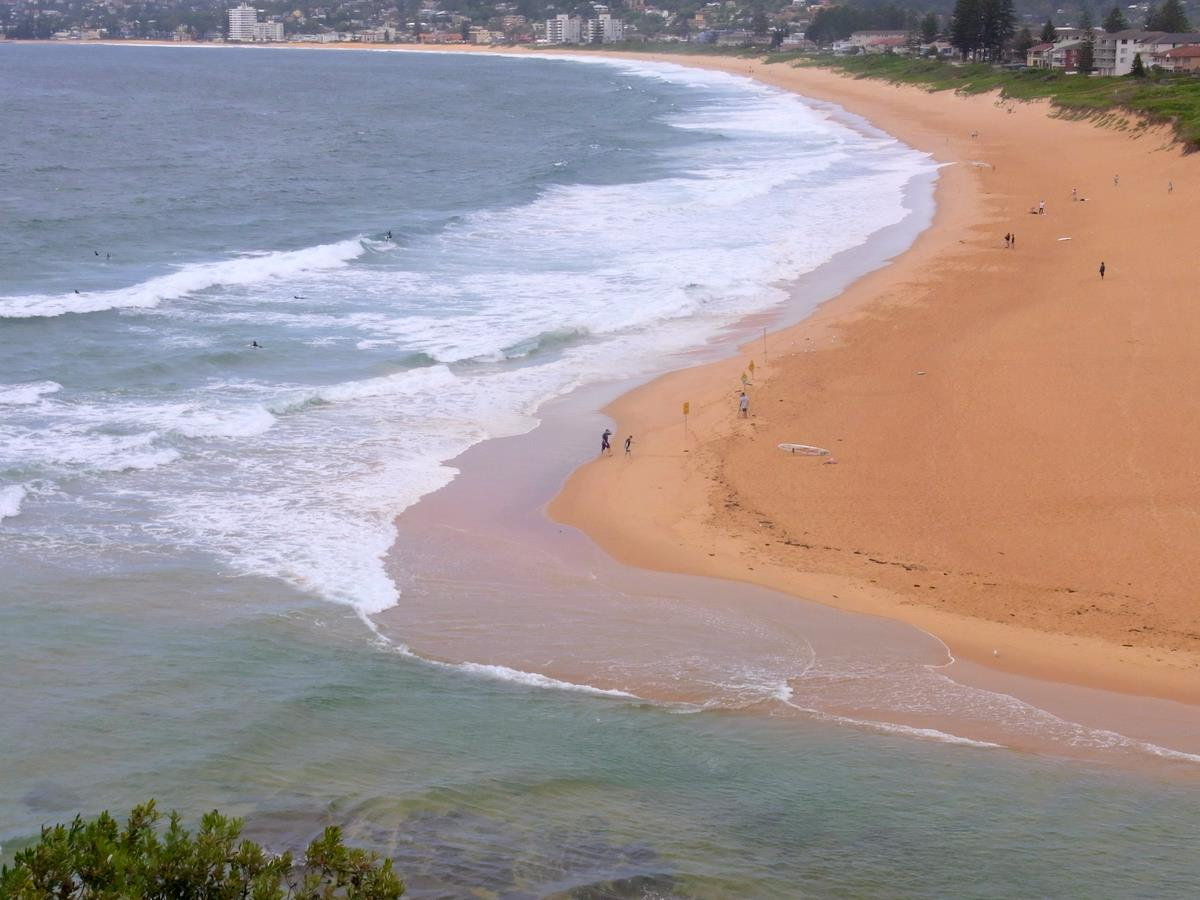
- North Narrabeen Beach

- Interactive map of North Narrabeen
- Country: Australia
- State: New South Wales
- City: Sydney
- LGA: Northern Beaches Council
- Location: 25 km (16 mi) north of Sydney CBD

Government
  - State electorate: Pittwater
  - Federal division: Mackellar
- Elevation: 5 m (16 ft)

Population
  - Total: 6,016 (2021 census)
- Postcode: 2101
Suburbs around North Narrabeen
| Ingleside | Warriewood |
| Elanora Heights | North Narrabeen | Tasman Sea |
| | Narrabeen Lagoon | Narrabeen |

North Narrabeen is a suburb in northern Sydney, New South Wales, Australia 25 kilometres north of the Sydney central business district, in the local government area of Northern Beaches Council. North Narrabeen is part of the Northern Beaches region.

North Narrabeen lies on the northern shores of Narrabeen lagoon, bounded by Warriewood to the north, Elanora Heights to the west and extends east to the ocean at Narrabeen Head. Narrabeen is opposite on the southern shore of the lagoon.

The northern section of Narrabeen Beach is known as North Narrabeen Beach. This ocean beach, together with the North Narrabeen Surf Lifesaving Club, are to the south of the lagoon in the suburb of Narrabeen.

== History ==
The first land grants were made to John Lees (40 acres), Philip Schaffer, (50 acres), and James Wheeler, (80 acres), along the south bank of Mullet Creek. Alex Macdonald was granted 80 acres (320,000 m^{2}) at the beach in 1815 and west of this land JT Collins had 93.5 acres (378,000 m^{2}) by 1857.

During the nineteenth century travellers had to ford the lake until the 1880s when the first bridge opened. A second bridge at the mouth of the lagoon in Ocean Street was built in 1925. The extension of tram services to Narrabeen in 1913 provided easier transport, and the whole area around the lake became popular for holidays and camping. A large camping ground became established on the north shore of the lagoon. In 1946 the Wakehurst Parkway was opened to North Narrabeen connecting the whole Pittwater area directly to Frenchs Forest and Seaforth.

Prior to World War II, the German Labour Front operated a cottage at Deep Creek to host Nazi Party meetings, as well as more relaxed events for German sailors, officers and other passing Germany dignitaries such as Felix von Luckner. There were rumours that the camp was used to collect intelligence, but a post-War Defence Department investigation failed to find any evidence of espionage activity. It was also rumoured that sailors expressing anti-Nazi sentiments were taken to the camp to be flogged. Several rocks in the area are engraved with swastikas, eagles and the names of German ships, presumably made by the German visitors.

== Population ==
In the 2021 Census, there were 6,016 people in North Narrabeen. 75.7% of people were born in Australia. The next most common countries of birth were England 6.8% and New Zealand 1.8%. 86.8% of people only spoke English at home. The most common responses for religion in North Narrabeen were No Religion 45.8%, Catholic 21.4% and Anglican 15.1%.

== Education ==
North Narrabeen is home to a primary school and a high school:

- Narrabeen North Public School
- Narrabeen Sports High School
