= Alex McTaggart =

Australian politician

Councillor of the Northern Beaches Council for Pittwater Ward
- In office 9 September 2017 – 4 December 2021

6th Mayor of Pittwater Council
- In office 12 September 2005 – September 2007
- Deputy: Patricia Giles
- Preceded by: Lynne Czinner
- Succeeded by: David James

Member of the New South Wales Parliament for Pittwater
- In office 26 November 2005 – 24 March 2007
- Preceded by: John Brogden
- Succeeded by: Rob Stokes

Councillor of Pittwater Council for North Ward
- In office September 1999 – 13 September 2008
- In office 8 September 2012 – 12 May 2016

Personal details
- Born: 24 January 1949 (age 77)

Alexander John McTaggart (born 24 January 1949) is an Australian politician who was an independent member of the New South Wales Legislative Assembly for Pittwater between 2005 and 2007. At the time of his election, McTaggart was also the Mayor of Pittwater Council.

== Early life ==
Alex McTaggart grew up in the Pittwater area of Sydney, attending Avalon Public School and then St Paul's Catholic College in Manly, before finishing with his Leaving Certificate and then gaining an Associate Diploma of Teaching (Technical) as well as horticulture and landscape design qualifications.

== Political career ==
Following the sudden resignation of John Brogden as Liberal Opposition Leader and his subsequent resignation from Parliament, McTaggart was elected to the Legislative Assembly in a 2005 by-election for Pittwater in what many considered as a shock result. The Liberals lost over 22 percent of their primary vote from 2003, allowing McTaggart to win with 55 percent of the two-party vote.

His victory was cited as a "disastrous loss" for the Liberal Party in a seat it had held for 32 years. McTaggart attributed his election win to his opposition to the television show Baywatch being filmed at Avalon Beach. In 1999, McTaggart had been a protester against a proposal for Baywatch to film permanently at the beach.

McTaggart was defeated in the 2007 state election, with Pittwater returning to the Liberal Party's Rob Stokes. McTaggart continued to serve on Pittwater Council as a North Ward Councillor, for which he was first elected in September 1999, until its amalgamation into the Northern Beaches Council on 12 May 2016.

== Northern Beaches Council ==
On 12 May 2016, with the release of the Local Government (Council Amalgamations) Proclamation 2016, the Northern Beaches Council was formed as per Warringah's submission, from Manly, Pittwater and Warringah councils. McTaggart was then named by Northern Beaches Administrator Dick Persson as a member of the Implementation Advisory Group, one of several advisory committees composed of former councillors and mayors of the three councils.

McTaggart then stood as an independent candidate for Pittwater Ward of the Northern Beaches Council and was elected in the second ward position on 9 September 2017. He unsuccessfully stood for re-election to this position at the following election held on 4 December 2021, being excluded on the 11th preference count after receiving 12.68% (0.5 of a quota) of the first preference vote in Pittwater Ward.

Civic offices
Preceded by Lynne Czinner	Mayor of Pittwater Council; 2005–2007	Succeeded by David James
New South Wales Legislative Assembly
Preceded by John Brogden	Member for Pittwater; 2005–2007	Succeeded by Rob Stokes
