= Nat Young =

Australian surfer and author (born 1947)

Personal information
- Born: Robert Harold Young; 14 November 1947 (age 78) Sydney, New South Wales, Australia
- Height: 193 cm (6 ft 4 in)
- Weight: 73 kg (160 lb)

Surfing career
- Sport: Surfing
- Major achievements: 1966 ISF World Surfing Champion (men's); 1970 Smirnoff World Pro-Am Surfing Championships Champion; Australian Surfing Champion: 1966, 1967 and 1969; Bells Beach Easter Classic winner 1966, 1967, 1970

Surfing specifications
- Stance: Regular (natural foot)
- Shapers: Gordon Woods, Donald Takayama, Ryan Burch
- Favorite maneuvers: Barrels

Robert Harold "Nat" Young (born 14 November 1947) is an Australian surfer and author.

== Surfing career ==
Born in Sydney, New South Wales, Young grew up in the small coastal suburb of Collaroy. In 1964, he was runner-up in the Australian junior championship at Manly, and two years later was named world surfing champion in 1966. He won the Smirnoff World Pro/Am in 1970 (Rolf Aurness won the actual world title in the same year). Young won three Australian titles in 1966, 1967 and 1969, and won the Bells Beach Surf Classic three times.

Young featured in a number of important surf films of 1960s and 1970s including the classic 1973 surf movie Crystal Voyager and 1968's Ride a White Horse, and he also had a featured role as surfer Nick Naylor in the 1979 Australian drama film Palm Beach.

== Post-surfing career ==
Young ran for NSW Parliament in the 1986 by-election for the seat of Pittwater. Labor did not run a candidate, and he was narrowly defeated by Liberal candidate Jim Longley.

Since retiring from professional surfing, Young has written several books about surfing and sailboarding in Australia. His son Beau Young has also seen some success in the sport, winning the World Longboard title in 2000 and again in 2003.

In 2000, Young perpetrated 'surf rage' when he physically hit a young surfer while surfing (and was severely bashed in retaliation) at his home break of Angourie after a long-running feud and heated altercation with another local surfer. During his recovery he wrote a book titled Surf Rage, calling for greater tolerance and mutual respect in the surfing community, although Young admitted he had acted aggressively during his career (where he had earned the nickname "The Animal"), and had acted provocatively towards his attacker, whom he met and forgave several months after the incident.

== Publications ==
- Young, Nat (1979). Nat Young's Book of Surfing: The Fundamentals and Adventure of Board-riding. Sydney: Reed. ISBN 0-589-50130-5.
- Young, Nat; Craig McGregor (1983). The History of Surfing. Sydney: Palm Beach Press. ISBN 0-9591816-0-1.
- Young, Nat (1983). Surfing Australia's East Coast. Sydney: Horowitz Grahame Books Pty. Ltd.
- Young, Nat (1986). Surfing & Sailboard Guide to Australia / Nat Young. Sydney: Palm Beach Press. ISBN 0-9591816-2-8.
- Young, Nat (1998). Nat's Nat, and That's That: An Autobiography. Sydney: Nymboida Press. ISBN 0-646-35778-6.
- Young, Nat (2001). Surf Rage, a surfers guide to turning negatives into positives. Sydney: Nymboida Press. ISBN 0-9585750-1-0.
- Young, Nat (2008). The complete history of surfing: from water to snow. Utah: Gibbs Smith. ISBN 978-1-4236-0266-8
- Young, Nat (2019). Church of the Open Sky. Michael Joseph. ISBN 978-0-1437-9671-8

Achievements
Preceded by Felipe Pomar	ISF World Surfing Champion (men's); 1966	Succeeded by Fred Hemmings
Preceded by Corky Carroll	Smirnoff World Pro-Am Surfing Championships winner 1970	Succeeded by Gavin Rudolph
