= Bruce Webster (politician) =

Australian politician and broadcaster (1927–2019)

Bruce Webster OAM

Member of the New South Wales Legislative Assembly for Pittwater
- In office 8 February 1975 – 21 July 1978
- Preceded by: Robert Askin
- Succeeded by: Max Smith

Personal details
- Born: 13 August 1927 Brighton, Victoria, Australia
- Died: 25 July 2019 (aged 91) Gosford, New South Wales, Australia
- Party: Liberal Party (since 1974)
- Occupation: Broadcaster

Bruce Laurence Webster OAM (13 August 1927 – 25 July 2019) was an Australian broadcaster and politician. He worked for the Australian Broadcasting Commission (ABC) from 1947, joining as a messenger boy, then becoming an announcer and newsreader. He was the member for Pittwater, in the New South Wales Legislative Assembly from 8 February 1975 until 21 July 1978.

== Media career ==
Bruce Webster worked in various roles in radio and television news, presentation and reporting at the ABC until the 1960s. Bruce joined Qantas in 1966 as PR Manager in San Francisco before moving back to Sydney in 1969 to join commercial media, co-hosting The Today Show on Channel 7 with Patricia Lovell.

== State politics ==
In the mid 1970s, Webster left the media to run for New South Wales state politics as a member of the Liberal Party. He succeeded Robert Askin in the seat of Pittwater at a 1975 by-election and was the party's spokesman on Mines and Energy.

== Return to media ==
Disillusioned with politics he left the parliament after about 4 years and joined Radio station 2UE as News Director before rejoining the ABC, moving to Canberra to present news and sport on 2CN 666 and to host the live radio broadcasts of Parliament on what is now ABC News Radio.

== Honours ==
Honours bestowed on Webster in his career included: the Order of Australia (OAM) Medal, the Queen's Jubilee Medal and the Centenary Medal.

== Personal life ==
Webster was the son of Sidney and Helena Webster. In 1952 he married his wife Pat, and they had three children.

He died, aged 91, in Gosford, New South Wales on 25 July 2019.

New South Wales Legislative Assembly
Preceded by Robert Askin	Member for Pittwater; 1975–1978	Succeeded by Max Smith
