= Rory Amon =

Australian politician

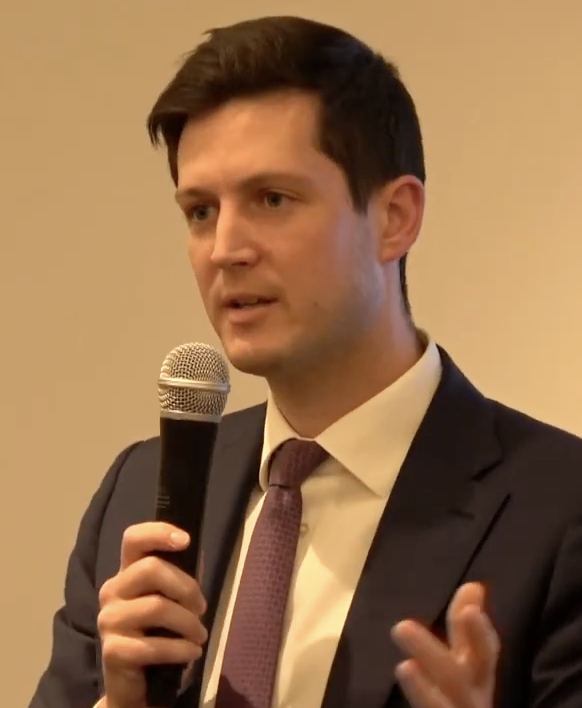

Member of the New South Wales Legislative Assembly for Pittwater
- In office 25 March 2023 – 30 August 2024
- Preceded by: Rob Stokes
- Succeeded by: Jacqui Scruby

Councillor of Northern Beaches Council for Pittwater Ward
- In office 4 December 2021 – 16 May 2023
- Succeeded by: Karina Page

Councillor of Northern Beaches Council for Narrabeen Ward
- In office 9 September 2017 – 4 December 2021

Personal details
- Born: Roderick Gilmore Amon; 1990 or 1991 (age 35–36)
- Party: Liberal (until 2024)
- Education: Macquarie University
- Occupation: Solicitor, politician
- Website: roryamon.com.au (archived)

Roderick Gilmore Amon (born 1990 or 1991) is a convicted child rapist and former politician who served as the member for Pittwater in the New South Wales Legislative Assembly from March 2023 until he was charged with child sex offences and resigned from parliament on 30 August 2024. He had previously served as a councillor on Northern Beaches Council from 2017 to 2023.

== Early life and education ==
Roderick Gilmore Amon was born to Alexe and Guy Amon, who operated a Mona Vale small business for nearly twenty years. He has five siblings, including a twin sister. Amon attended Covenant Christian School in Belrose, and Knox Grammar School, before studying commerce and law at Macquarie University, graduating with first class honours in Law.

== Career ==
Amon worked as a paralegal while a university student, and was admitted as a solicitor in New South Wales. As a solicitor, he has specialised in family law.

Amon has been a volunteer firefighter since 2013 and was the president of the Davidson Volunteer Rural Fire Brigade from 2015 to 2018.

A rugby union referee, Amon was due to officiate in the Shute Shield grand final on 31 August 2024 but was replaced on the day of his arrest for child sex offences.

=== Politics ===
Amon was preselected as the Liberal Party's lead candidate for Narrabeen Ward on the newly-formed Northern Beaches Council for the 2017 local government elections. He was successful at being elected, with the Liberal ticket in Narrabeen Ward receiving 31.8% of the vote.

He moved to Pittwater Ward for the 2021 local elections, where he was re-elected.

In December 2022, Amon was preselected as the Liberal candidate for Pittwater at the 2023 state election, to replace retiring MP Rob Stokes. Stokes and then-premier Dominic Perrottet did not support Amon's preselection for the seat, preferring a female candidate and concerned about a possible large swing to teal independent candidate Jacqui Scruby.

Despite a 20.2% two-candidate-preferred vote swing against the Liberals and towards Scruby, Amon was elected on 25 March 2023. He resigned as a councillor two months later on 16 May, and was replaced via countback by Karina Page.

On 11 May 2023, he was appointed as the Shadow Assistant Minister for Youth, Housing, and Planning and Public Spaces.

== Child sex charges ==
On 30 August 2024, Amon was charged with ten child sex offences, relating to the alleged sexual assault of a 13-year-old boy at Mona Vale in July 2017. The charges were "five counts of sexual intercourse with a person aged over 10 and under 14, two counts of attempted sexual intercourse with a child over 10 and under 14, two counts of indecent assault on a person under 16, and committing an act of indecency with a person under 16".

After being charged, Amon resigned as a member of the Liberal Party. Several hours later, he was asked by then opposition leader Mark Speakman to resign from parliament, which he did on the same day. His seat was won by Independent Jacqui Scruby in the 2024 Pittwater state by-election.

Amon was listed to appear at Manly Local Court on 24 October 2024.

On 15 May 2025, Amon was charged with breaching his bail conditions after failing to report to police as required. Amon's trial commenced on 20 February 2026 and he pleaded not guilty to 10 counts of sexual assault. He is being prosecuted at the Supreme Court. On 9 March 2026, the jury in the trial acquitted Amon of eight of the ten charges, but remained deadlocked on two charges, one of indecent assault of a person aged under 16 years and another of sexual intercourse with a person aged 10–14.

In April 2026, Amon was retried on the two counts that the jury could not decide on.

On 13 November 2026, Amon was found guilty to the remaining two charges and is listed for a sentencing hearing on 27 November.
