= 2005 Pittwater state by-election =

Election result for Pittwater, New South Wales, Australia

A by-election was held in the New South Wales Legislative Assembly district of Pittwater on 26 November 2005. It was triggered by the resignation of sitting member and former Liberal Party leader John Brogden.

The by-election resulted in the Liberal Party losing the seat to Independent candidate Alex McTaggart.

== Background ==
John Brogden was elected leader of the state Liberal Party in March 2002, and thus became Leader of the Opposition. He led the party to its third consecutive defeat at the 2003 state election but remained leader of the party thereafter. In August 2005, it was reported that at an evening function on 29 July, a drunken Brogden had sexually harassed at least one female reporter and uttered a racist slur against Helena Carr, the Malaysian-born wife of outgoing Premier Bob Carr. Brogden owned up to his behaviour on the morning of the 29 August, although it was not until the afternoon of the same day that he announced his resignation as leader of the party.

When he stepped down as leader, Brogden announced that he would remain a member of parliament, describing his future role as that of a "middle-bencher". The following day however, the episode took a whole new turn when Brogden was rushed to hospital after a suicide attempt. A month later, on 28 September 2005, Brogden announced his resignation from parliament, citing the need for further treatment.

Pittwater is historically a comfortably safe Liberal seat. Labor has only come close to winning it once, in the "Wranslide" of 1978. Indeed, Labor did not even put up a candidate for the by-election.

However, a strong challenge was presented in the form of Pittwater Council Mayor Alex McTaggart, running as an independent. At the by-election, McTaggart defeated Liberal candidate Paul Nicolaou in what was widely considered a shock result. Nicolaou lost over 22 percent of the Liberals' primary vote from 2003, and only won 44.6 percent of the two-party vote to McTaggart's 55.3 percent.

== Results ==
2005 Pittwater by-election Saturday 26 November
| Party | Candidate | Votes | % | ±% |
|---|---|---|---|---|
| Independent | Alex McTaggart | 15,052 | 39.23 | +39.23 |
| Liberal | Paul Nicolaou | 14,622 | 38.11 | −22.16 |
| Christian Democrats | Patricia Giles | 3,208 | 8.36 | +5.54 |
| Greens | Natalie Stevens | 2,819 | 7.35 | −6.73 |
| Independent | Robert Dunn | 2,316 | 6.04 | +6.04 |
| Democrats | Mario Nicotra | 348 | 0.91 | −1.29 |
| Total formal votes | | 38,365 | 98.13 | +0.06 |
| Informal votes | | 730 | 1.87 | −0.06 |
| Turnout | | 39,095 | 85.20 | −5.98 |
Two-candidate-preferred result
| Independent | Alex McTaggart | 19,683 | 55.36 | +55.36 |
| Liberal | Paul Nicolaou | 15,869 | 44.64 | −25.47 |
| Independent gain from Liberal | | Swing | N/A | |

== Aftermath ==
Alex McTaggart was defeated at the 2007 state election when the seat returned to the Liberal Party fold but Paul Nicholau was not renominated for the seat. The successful Liberal candidate was instead Rob Stokes.
