= Jacqui Scruby =

Australian politician

Jacqui Scruby MP
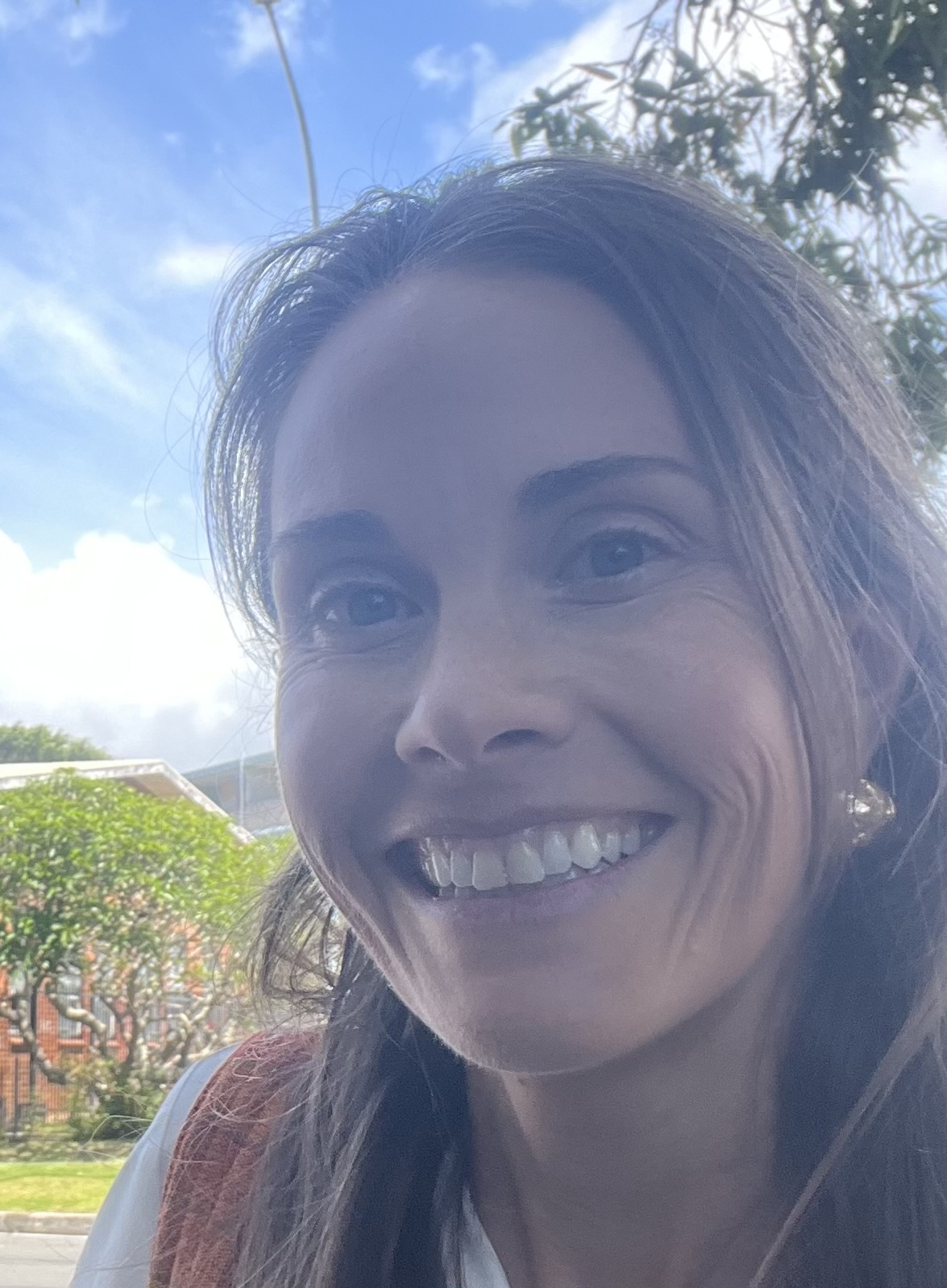
- Scruby in 2024

Member of the New South Wales Legislative Assembly for Pittwater
- Incumbent
- Assumed office 19 October 2024
- Preceded by: Rory Amon

Personal details
- Party: Independent
- Spouse: Michael Scruby
- Children: 2
- Education: University of Technology Sydney
- Occupation: Sustainability consultant Environmental lawyer

Jacqueline Claire Scruby is an Australian independent politician who was elected to the New South Wales Legislative Assembly in the 2024 Pittwater state by-election on 19 October 2024. She had previously unsuccessfully contested the seat at the 2023 New South Wales state election, coming within 606 votes of winning. Described as a "teal independent", her candidacy was backed by the organisation Climate 200.

== Education and career ==
Scruby received a Bachelor of Medical Science and a Bachelor of Laws from University of Technology Sydney in 2007. She also received a Graduate Certificate of Legal Practice from the College of Law in 2007 and subsequently worked as a sustainability consultant, an environmental lawyer and as an adviser to federal Independent MPs Sophie Scamps and Zali Steggall.
