= Electoral district of Pittwater =

Pittwater New South Wales—Legislative Assembly
- Interactive map of district boundaries from the 2023 state election
- State: New South Wales
- Dates current: 1973–present
- MP: Jacqui Scruby
- Party: Independent
- Namesake: Pittwater
- Electors: 57,196 (2024)
- Area: 190.16 km^{2} (73.4 sq mi)
- Demographic: Outer-metropolitan
Electorates around Pittwater:
Hornsby	Gosford	Pacific Ocean
Hornsby	Pittwater	Pacific Ocean
Davidson	Wakehurst	Pacific Ocean

Pittwater is an electoral district of the Legislative Assembly in the Australian state of New South Wales. Located in Sydney's north-east, it is 175.32 km^{2} in size, and comprises a part of the local government area of Northern Beaches Council, mostly the portion that was formerly Pittwater Council.

It is named after Pittwater, a body of water the district roughly surrounds.

Independent Jacqui Scruby was elected at the 2024 by-election, following the resignation of incumbent Liberal MP Rory Amon on 30 August 2024 after he was charged with child sex offences.

== History ==
The electoral district of Pittwater was created in 1973. Located in the traditional Liberal stronghold of Sydney's Northern Beaches, it was a comfortably safe Liberal seat for most of the first half-century of its existence. Its first member was Sir Robert William Askin, then Premier of New South Wales. It had been created out of a large chunk of Askin's old seat of Collaroy, and was thus a natural place for Askin to transfer when the seat was abolished.

The seat was held by New South Wales Opposition Leader John Brogden until his dramatic resignation in 2005. The Liberal stranglehold on the seat was lost in the resulting by-election when the Mayor of Pittwater Council, Alex McTaggart, standing as an independent candidate, defeated the Liberal Paul Nicolau in a landslide.

The seat reverted to form at the 2007 general election, with new Liberal candidate Rob Stokes comfortably regaining the seat for his party with 61% of the two-party vote to McTaggart's 39%. Stokes actually won just over 50% of the primary vote, just a few thousand votes over the threshold to win the seat without the need for preferences. Stokes won every booth in the district with the exception of Scotland Island, whose few hundred offshore voters traditionally buck the trend. Stokes held the seat without serious difficulty until the 2023 NSW state election, when he retired on a majority of 20.8 percent, the third-safest in the state for a Coalition-held metropolitan seat.

At the 2023 election, Liberal Party newcomer Rory Amon was nearly defeated by teal independent Jacqui Scruby, surviving by only 606 votes.

While Labor usually runs dead in northern Sydney, Pittwater is especially unfriendly territory for Labor even by northern Sydney standards. Labor has only come reasonably close to winning the seat once, when it scored a 14-point swing in the "Wranslide" of 1978. However, Labor has not won more than 20 percent of the primary vote since 1984, and not placed better than third place since 2007. Underscoring this, even with the large swing against the Liberals in 2023, Amon would retained the seat with a 13.2 percent majority in a "traditional" contest with Labor.

Amon was forced out of politics in 2024 after being charged with child sex offences. Scruby took the seat off the Liberals at the ensuing by-election.

The seat is entirely within the federal seat of Mackellar, which was a longstanding Liberal stronghold until it was won by teal independent Sophie Scamps.

== Geography ==
On its current boundaries, Pittwater includes the suburbs or localities of Avalon, Bayview, Bilgola, Church Point, Cottage Point, Duffys Forest, Elanora Heights, Ingleside, Ku-ring-gai Chase, Mona Vale, Narrabeen, Newport, North Narrabeen, Palm Beach, Scotland Island, Terrey Hills, and Warriewood.

== Members for Pittwater ==
Image	Member	Party	Term	Notes
	Robert Askin	Liberal	17 November 1973 – 3 January 1975	Premier from 1965 until 1975. Previously the member for Collaroy. Retired
	Bruce Webster	Liberal	8 February 1975 – 21 July 1978	Won by-election. Resigned several months before 1978 state election
	Max Smith	Liberal	7 October 1978 – 1984	Resigned from Liberal Party sometime after the 1984 election. Resigned from parliament
	Max Smith	Independent	1984 – 11 April 1986	Resigned from Liberal Party sometime after the 1984 election. Resigned from parliament
	Jim Longley	Liberal	31 May 1986 – 20 March 1996	Won by-election. Resigned
	John Brogden	Liberal	25 May 1996 – 28 September 2005	Won by-election. Leader of the Opposition from 2002 until 2005. Resigned after a suicide attempt
	Alex McTaggart	Independent	26 November 2005 – 24 March 2007	Won by-election. Lost seat
	Rob Stokes	Liberal	24 March 2007 – 25 March 2023	Retired
	Rory Amon	Liberal	25 March 2023 – 30 August 2024	Resigned simultaneously from parliament and the Liberal Party after being charged with child sex offences
	Jacqui Scruby	Independent	19 October 2024 – present	Won by-election. Incumbent

== Election results ==
2024 Pittwater state by-election
Party	Candidate	Votes	%	±%
Independent	Jacqui Scruby	25,705	54.17	+18.31
Liberal	Georgia Ryburn	19,852	41.84	−2.87
Libertarian	Doug Rennie	1,893	3.99	+3.99
Total formal votes		47,450	97.43	−0.32
Informal votes		1,250	2.57	+0.32
Turnout		48,700	85.15	−5.01
Two-candidate-preferred result
Independent	Jacqui Scruby	26,050	55.94	+6.60
Liberal	Georgia Ryburn	20,519	44.06	−6.60
Independent gain from Liberal		Swing	−6.60	
