= John Brogden (politician) =

Australian politician (born 1969)

John Gilbert Brogden AM
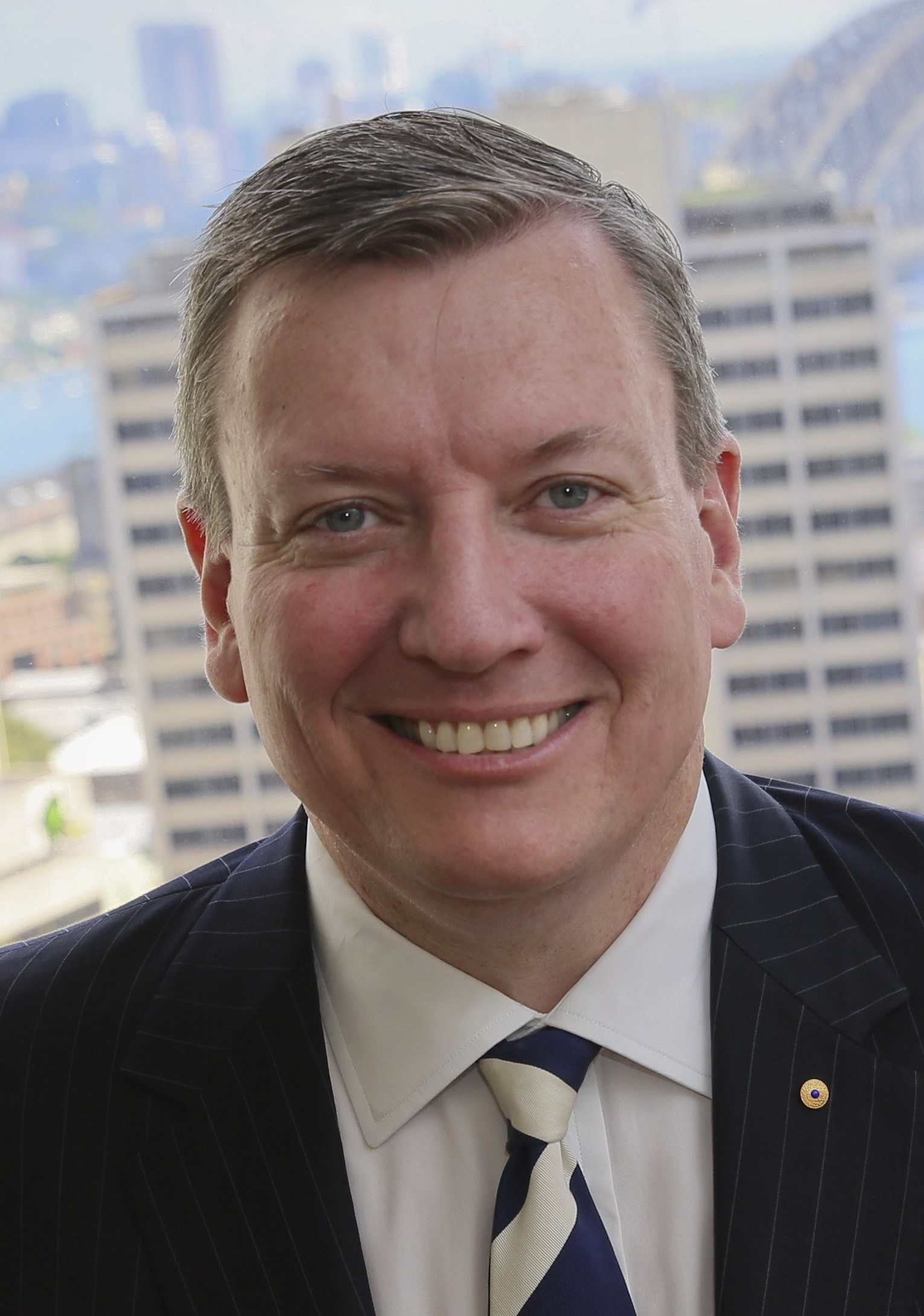
- Brodgen in 2015

Leader of the Opposition of New South Wales Elections: 2003
- In office 28 March 2002 – 1 September 2005
- Premier: Bob Carr; Morris Iemma
- Deputy: Chris Hartcher; Barry O’Farrell
- Preceded by: Kerry Chikarovski
- Succeeded by: Peter Debnam

Member of the New South Wales Parliament for Pittwater
- In office 25 May 1996 – 28 September 2005
- Preceded by: Jim Longley
- Succeeded by: Alex McTaggart

Personal details
- Born: 28 March 1969 (age 57) Sydney, New South Wales, Australia
- Party: Liberal Party
- Spouse: Lucy Brogden
- Children: 3

John Gilbert Brogden AM (born 28 March 1969) is an Australian businessman, philanthropist, and former politician. He was a Liberal Party member for Pittwater in the New South Wales Legislative Assembly from May 1996 until his resignation in August 2005, and served as the leader of the opposition in New South Wales from 2002 to 2005.

After politics, Brogden served as the chairman and CEO of various organisations in the financial services and property sectors. After a suicide attempt in August 2005 immediately after his resignation as opposition leader, Brogden would join the board of the crisis support charity Lifeline in 2009, and subsequently became its chairman from 2011 to 2021.

== Early life and family ==
Brogden was born in Balmain and raised in Sydney. His father Gilbert Arthur Brogden, a carpenter, was born in Taranaki, New Zealand in 1933 and emigrated to Australia in 1960. His mother, Judith Anne (née Bourne) (1941 – 2021) was born in Balmain and worked as a School Secretary. He was educated at St Joan of Arc, Haberfield, St Patrick's College, Strathfield and the University of Sydney where he gained a Master of Public Affairs (MPA).

His wife, Lucy Brogden AM, is an organisational psychologist and national mental health and suicide prevention advocate, a carer, a Patron of Partners in Depression, Patron of the Sydney Women's Fund and Lifeline Northern Beaches, Chair of the Diabetes Australia Research Trust, a, Director of the National Film and Sound Archives and of Be Kind Australia. She is Governor of Queenwood School for Girls. From 2017 to 2022, she was the chair of the National Mental Health Commission advising the Prime Minister and Minister for Health on mental health policy. They have three children.

== Political career ==
John Brogden joined the Liberal Party in his final year of high school in 1986. Between 1989 and 1994 he was an adviser to Attorney General John Hannaford, Premier John Fahey and Police Minister Ted Pickering. From 1992 to 1993 he was President of the NSW Division of the Young Liberal Movement, and a member of the NSW Division's State Executive. In 1994, he served a year as Treasurer of the Movement and ran unsuccessfully for preselection in the state seat of Vaucluse. Brogden had lost the Vaucluse preselection to Peter Debnam and Debnam would later succeed Brogden as Liberal leader in 2005.

Brogden was elected to the NSW Legislative Assembly as the Member for Pittwater in May 1996 in a by-election following the resignation of former Fahey government minister Jim Longley. In 1999, he was promoted to the shadow ministry as the shadow minister for urban affairs and planning, Sydney Water and youth affairs.

In the leadup to the 2003 New South Wales state election, Opposition Leader Kerry Chikarovski was struggling in the polls against Premier Bob Carr. On 25 March 2002, Brogden announced a challenge. Three days later on 28 March 2002, his 33rd birthday, he succeeded in a 15–14 vote, becoming the youngest ever leader of a state or federal Liberal Party.

What was not known at the time was that state Liberal director Scott Morrison had a plan to have Chikarovski replaced by Malcolm Turnbull, with the plan abandoned as a result of Brogden's successful challenge. Turnbull and Morrison went on to be elected to federal parliament and in 2015 Turnbull became prime minister and Morrison his treasurer. Morrison succeeded Turnbull as prime minister in 2018.

At the 2003 election, the Liberals won one seat from Labor and lost one to Labor. Notwithstanding the electoral defeat, Brogden improved his and the party's standing in the polls over the next two years. Many people believing that Brogden would win the 2007 New South Wales state election, especially when Bob Carr resigned from politics and Morris Iemma was elected as the new premier.

Brogden confronted the government over a number of issues, often focusing on health and police corruption. He aggressively pursued the Carr government over its involvement in the Orange Grove affair, in which a shopping centre was shut down, allegedly for zoning reasons, amidst claims of political pressure from The Westfield Group, which ran a neighbouring shopping centre.

Despite the improvement in the opposition's opinion poll ratings during 2004 and early 2005, Brogden's hopes that he would gain the premiership in 2007 were not to be fulfilled. He became embroiled in controversy for his behaviour at a function in Sydney on 29 July 2005. As a result of the controversy, Brogden resigned as leader of the NSW opposition on 29 August. Nevertheless, he announced his intention to remain as the member for Pittwater.

The next day however, 30 August, police attended Brogden's electorate office at around 10.30 pm, after concerns were raised by members of his family. They found him unconscious in a back room, having attempted suicide. When The Sydney Morning Herald called Brogden's deputy Barry O'Farrell at about 11 pm to question him about possible leadership contention, he told them, "Excuse me if I say I don't care about the leadership at the moment, but I am following an ambulance with John Brogden inside. He has attempted self-harm. It sort of puts things in perspective, doesn't it?". Brogden was taken to Royal North Shore Hospital that night, and discharged the following day into respite care at the Northside Clinic. On 1 September, Brogden and his wife issued a short statement thanking people who had sent messages of support, and inviting people wishing to help further to donate to Beyond Blue.

Brogden resigned from parliament on 28 September. A by-election was held for the seat of Pittwater, which, in a backlash to the Liberal Party and media treatment of Brogden, was won by Pittwater Council mayor Alex McTaggart, running as an independent. At the 2007 state election, McTaggart was defeated by Liberal candidate Rob Stokes, a former adviser to Brogden.

== Business career and philanthropy ==
In May 2018, Brogden was appointed as Chief Executive Officer at Landcom. Prior to this appointment, he was Chairman of the Board at UrbanGrowth NSW/Landcom from 2012 to 2018.

In November 2009, Brogden joined the board of Australian suicide prevention charity Lifeline, and was promoted to chairman in 2011. In February 2021, Brogden became the president of Lifeline International, a charity that supports international crisis centres "through policy, research, knowledge sharing and capacity building efforts we undertake globally". Brogden remains a patron of the organization.

In 2014, Brogden was named as a member of the Order of Australia for significant service to the community and social welfare.

Political offices
| Preceded by Kerry Chikarovski | Leader of the Opposition of New South Wales; 2002–2005 | Succeeded by Peter Debnam |
New South Wales Legislative Assembly
| Preceded by Jim Longley | Member for Pittwater; 1996–2005 | Succeeded by Alex McTaggart |
Party political offices
| Preceded by Kerry Chikarovski | Leader of the New South Wales Liberal Party; 2002–2005 | Succeeded by Peter Debnam |
