= Max Smith =

Australian politician

Richard Max Smith (22 February 1930 – 8 November 2020) was an Australian politician. He represented Pittwater in the New South Wales Legislative Assembly from 1978 to 1986, first as a member of the Liberal Party and then as an independent.

Smith was born in Gladesville to John Voyle Smith and Doris Ethel Cullen. He was educated at Parramatta High School and then the University of Sydney, and was selected as the youngest member sent to the Duke of Edinburgh's 1956 study conference at Oxford. He became a miner and colliery manager. He worked for Australian Iron and Steel from 1951 to 1962 and was superintendent of Rio Tinto from 1962 to 1967, subsequently serving as consultant mining engineer until 1974. From 1974 to 1978 he was technical and operations director of Coalex. He married Helen on 3 October 1953 and had three children; he subsequently married Sandra Simpson on 28 April 1984, and Janet Lawrence on 15 March 1998.

When the state Liberal MP for Pittwater, Bruce Webster, resigned in 1978, Smith was selected as the Liberal candidate to contest the seat in the upcoming election; he had a narrow victory over Charles Wild, the Labor candidate. In 1984, he resigned from the Liberal Party to sit as an independent, and resigned from parliament altogether in 1986.

New South Wales Legislative Assembly
| Preceded by Bruce Webster | Member for Pittwater; 1978–1986 | Succeeded by Jim Longley |
