= Robert Askin =

Australian politician

The Honourable Sir Robert Askin GCMG
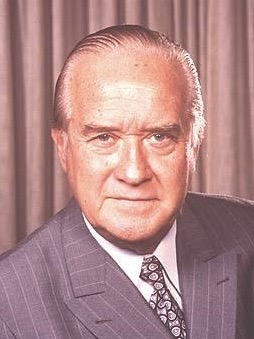
- Askin in 1973.

32nd Premier of New South Wales
- In office 13 May 1965 – 3 January 1975
- Monarch: Elizabeth II
- Governor: Sir Eric Woodward (1965); Sir Roden Cutler (1965–75)
- Deputy: Sir Charles Cutler
- Preceded by: Jack Renshaw
- Succeeded by: Tom Lewis

20th Leader of the Opposition of New South Wales Elections: 1962, 1965
- In office 17 July 1959 – 13 May 1965
- Deputy: Eric Willis
- Preceded by: Pat Morton
- Succeeded by: Jack Renshaw

Member of the New South Wales Parliament for Pittwater
- In office 17 November 1973 – 3 January 1975
- Preceded by: New district
- Succeeded by: Bruce Webster

Member of the New South Wales Parliament for Collaroy
- In office 17 June 1950 – 17 November 1973
- Preceded by: New district
- Succeeded by: Seat abolished

6th Leader of the New South Wales Liberal Party
- In office 17 July 1959 – 3 January 1975
- Deputy: Eric Willis
- Preceded by: Pat Morton
- Succeeded by: Tom Lewis

Personal details
- Born: Robin William Askin; 4 April 1907 Sydney, New South Wales
- Died: 9 September 1981 (aged 74) Sydney, New South Wales
- Party: Liberal Party
- Spouse(s): Mollie Underhill (Lady Askin)
- Awards: Knight Grand Cross of the Order of St Michael and St George; Officer of the National Order of the Cedar (Lebanon)

Military service
- Allegiance: Australia
- Branch/service: Australian Army
- Years of service: 1925–1929; 1942–1946
- Rank: Sergeant
- Unit: 55th Battalion, CMF; 2/31st Infantry Battalion
- Battles/wars: World War II; New Guinea campaign; Borneo campaign; Battle of Balikpapan

Sir Robert William Askin (4 April 1907 – 9 September 1981), was an Australian politician and the 32nd premier of New South Wales from 1965 to 1975, the first representing the Liberal Party. He was born in 1907 as Robin William Askin, but always disliked his first name and changed it by deed poll in 1971. Before being knighted in 1972, however, he was generally known as Bob Askin. Born in Sydney in 1907, Askin was educated at Sydney Technical High School. After serving as a bank officer and as a sergeant in the Second World War, Askin joined the Liberal Party and was elected to the seat of Collaroy at the 1950 election.

Askin quickly rose through party ranks, eventually becoming deputy leader following Walter Howarth's resignation in July 1954. When long-serving party leader Vernon Treatt announced his resignation in August 1954, Askin put his name forward to replace him. At the vote, he became deadlocked against Pat Morton and Askin asked his former commanding officer Murray Robson to take the leadership instead. Robson did not live up to expectations and was deposed in September 1955 by Morton, who then became leader. Askin remained as deputy until, after leading the party to a second electoral defeat in 1959, Morton was deposed and Askin was elected to succeed him. At the May 1965 election, Askin presented the Liberal Party as a viable alternative government. He won a narrow victory, ending a 24-year Labor hold on government.

Askin's time in office was marked by a significant increase in public works programs, strong opposition to an increase in Commonwealth powers, laissez-faire economic policies and wide-ranging reforms in laws and regulations such as the Law Reform Commission, the introduction of consumer laws, legal aid, breath-testing of drivers, the liberalisation of liquor laws and the restoration of postal voting in NSW elections. More controversial changes included the 1967 abolition of Sydney City Council and increased rates of development in Sydney, often at the expense of architectural heritage and historic buildings. This culminated in the 'Green ban' movement of the 1970s led by the union movement to conserve the heritage of Sydney.

At the end of his term, after winning another three elections, Askin was the second longest serving Premier of New South Wales (after Henry Parkes) and served the longest contiguous term of any premier. This record has since been overtaken by Neville Wran and Bob Carr. Askin remains the longest-serving Leader of the New South Wales Liberal Party. Since his death in 1981, however, Askin's legacy has been tarnished by persistent allegations that he was involved in organised crime and official corruption.

== Early years ==
Robin William Askin was born in Sydney, New South Wales on 4 April 1907, at the Crown Street Women's Hospital, (Note: Various birthdates have been recorded in 1901, 1907 and 1909, however 4 April 1907 is generally considered the correct date.) the eldest of three sons of Ellen Laura Halliday (née Rowe) and William James Askin, an Adelaide-born sailor and worker for New South Wales Railways. His parents later married on 29 September 1916. Askin spent his early years in Stuart Town before his family moved to Glebe, a working-class inner-city suburb of Sydney. After primary education at Glebe Public School, Askin was awarded a bursary to study at Sydney Technical High School, where he sat in the same class as the future aviator Charles Kingsford Smith. At school he gained good marks, with a particular interest in Mathematics and History, and enjoyed swimming and Rugby League. He completed his Intermediate Certificate in 1921.

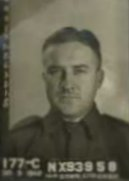
Photograph of Private Askin on his enlistment in March 1942.

At the age of 15, after a short time in the electrical trade, in 1922 Askin joined the Government Savings Bank of New South Wales as a Clerk. However, when the Savings Bank closed due to the Great Depression in 1931, he joined the Rural Bank of New South Wales. Between 1925 and 1929 Askin served part-time as a lieutenant in the 55th Battalion, Citizens Military Forces. On 5 February 1937 Askin married Mollie Isabelle Underhill, a typist at the bank, at Gilbert Park Methodist Church, Manly. They lived in Manly for the rest of their lives. He began his interest in politics by assisting in Percy Spender's successful campaign for Askin's local seat of Warringah as an Independent candidate at the 1937 federal election. In 1940 Askin was appointed manager of the bank service department, which focused on public relations. He served as vice-president from 1939 to 1940 and president from 1940 to 1941 of the Rural Bank branch of the United Bank Officers' Association.

Askin enlisted as a private in the Second Australian Imperial Force on 30 March 1942. An instructor with the 14th Infantry Training Battalion at Dubbo, he was appointed acting corporal, then reverted to private. In November 1942 he joined the 2/31st Infantry Battalion in New Guinea, where he served for two months. He was in New Guinea for another six months from July 1943. Landing at Balikpapan, Borneo, in July 1945, Askin was promoted to sergeant under Lieutenant Colonel Murray Robson. When hostilities ceased, he unsuccessfully attempted to set up an import business in Bandjermasin. Returning to Australia in February 1946, he was demobilised on 22 March.

== Early political career ==
Upon demobilisation, Askin returned to work at the Rural Bank, managing its travel department. However, his interest in politics arose again when he assisted his former commanding officer, Lieutenant Colonel Robson, in retaining his seat of Vaucluse at the 1947 state election for the newly formed Liberal Party, which Askin then joined. Rapidly rising through the party ranks, Askin soon became President of the Liberals' Manly branch and supported Bill Wentworth's successful bid for the new seat of Mackellar at the 1949 election.

Askin gained preselection for and won the newly created seat of Collaroy, located in the Northern Beaches, at the 17 June 1950 election, gaining 63.69% of the vote. The leader of the Liberal Party since 1946, Vernon Treatt led the Liberal/Country Coalition at the election, which resulted in a hung parliament, with Treatt's Coalition gaining 12 seats and a swing of 6.7% for a total of 46 seats. With the Labor Party also holding 46 seats, the balance of power lay with the two re-elected Independent Labor member, James Geraghty and John Seiffert, who had been expelled from the party for disloyalty during the previous parliament. Under a legalistic interpretation of the ALP rules, Seiffert was readmitted to the party and, together with the support of Geraghty, Premier James McGirr and Labor were able to stay in power. As the new local member for a constituency covering most of the Northern Beaches from North Manly to Pittwater, Askin protested against the lack of government development and services in the area, such as sewerage, education, and transport.

Labor's near-defeat weakened McGirr's position and he was replaced as premier by Joseph Cahill in April 1952. Cahill had won popular support as a vigorous and impressive minister who had resolved problems with New South Wales' electricity supply and in his first 10 months as premier had reinvigorated the party. He appeared decisive and brought order to the government's chaotic public works program. In addition, he attacked the increasingly unpopular federal Coalition government of Robert Menzies. All this contributed to Treatt's Coalition being defeated at the 14 February 1953 election, with a total loss of ten seats and a swing against them of 7.2%. Askin retained his seat with 63.35%.

=== Deputy Leader ===
With confidence in his leadership demolished, Treatt's Liberal Party descended into factional in-fighting culminating in the resignation of Deputy Leader Walter Howarth on 22 July 1954, who publicly announced it on 4 July citing that he felt that Treatt doubted his loyalty. He was replaced by now-Party Whip Askin. The resignation split the party and sparked a leadership challenge from Pat Morton. At the party meeting on 6 July, Treatt narrowly defeated Morton with 12 votes to 10. With party support eroded, Treatt did not remain long as leader afterwards. On Friday 6 August 1954, Treatt announced that he would resign as leader. At the following party meeting, after a deadlocked vote between Askin and Morton, Askin asked his friend Murray Robson to nominate and subsequently he was elected to succeed Treatt.

Like other senior members of the party, after having no conservative government since Alexander Mair in 1941, Robson had no experience in government, had little interest in policy and alienated many party members by trying to forge a closer alliance with Michael Bruxner's Country Party. Over a year after Robson assumed the leadership, at a party meeting on 20 September 1955, senior party member Ken McCaw moved that the leadership be declared vacant, citing that Robson's leadership lacked the qualities necessary for winning the next election. The motion was carried 15 votes to 5. Morton was then elected unopposed as leader, with Askin remaining as deputy leader.

Morton then led the party to defeat at the election on 3 March 1956. The Coalition gained six seats, reducing the government's majority from twenty to six. Askin retained Collaroy with 70.14%. Morton again led the opposition to the ballot at the 21 March 1959 election, which resulted in an overall gain of three seats but the loss of two seats to Labor. After counting was finalised the Cahill Government was left with an overall majority of four seats. Askin retained his seat with 71.09%.

== Leader of the Opposition ==
Morton's refusal to give up his many business interests while as leader led many to accuse him of being a 'part-time leader' and together with his second election loss, eroded confidence in his leadership. On 14 July 1959, three Liberal MLAs called on Morton to resign, stating that the party needed a full-time leader and that Morton no longer commanded the majority support of his colleagues. Morton refused and instead called an emergency meeting on 17 July to confirm his leadership.

By this time, Askin had emerged as one of the main opponents to his longtime friend and former commander. However, he and the other major challenger to Morton's leadership, Eric Willis declared that they would only take the leadership if they were given an absolute majority of 28 votes. At the party meeting, a spill motion to remove Morton as leader carried by two votes. Willis then surprised many by deciding not to put his name forward for nomination, leaving Askin to take the leadership unopposed. Willis was eventually elected as deputy leader. Upon election, Askin declared that "One of my main tasks will be to sell our [Liberal Party] ideas and principles to the working man."

When Premier Cahill died on 22 October 1959, he was replaced by Askin's friend and parliamentary contemporary, Robert "Bob" Heffron, which tended to calm his aggression and opposition towards the government. At the March 1962 election, Labor had been in power for 21 years and Heffron had since been Premier for 2 and a half years. Heffron was 72 at the time of the election and his age and the longevity of the government were made issues by the Askin's opposition which described it as being composed of "tired old men". The standing of Heffron's government suffered when the electors rejected its proposal to abolish the New South Wales Legislative Council at a referendum in April 1961, being the first time Labor had lost a state electoral poll in 20 years. Askin's successful opposition campaign centred on warning of a Labor-dominated single house subject to "Communist and Trades Hall influence".

Labor's policies for the election included the establishment of a Department of Industrial Development to reduce unemployment, free school travel, aid to home buyers and commencing the construction of the Sydney–Newcastle Freeway as a toll-road. By contrast, Askin put forward a wide-ranging program of reform and addressed contentious issues including the introduction of State Aid for private schools, making rent control fairer and the legalisation of off-course betting on horse races. Askin accused the state government of allowing the transport infrastructure of the state to decline and promised to build the Newcastle freeway without a toll, to construct the Eastern Suburbs Railway and to plan for a second crossing of Sydney Harbour. Askin also made promises for more resources in mental health and district hospitals.

Despite these promises, Askin and the new Country Party Leader, Charles Cutler, lost the election to Heffron, mainly due to the adverse reactions of voters towards the November 1960 "horror budget" and credit squeeze made by the federal Coalition government under Menzies. The Coalition lost five seats, despite a small swing of 0.16% and the Coalition gaining the support of prominent media businessman, Frank Packer, who helped project the image of Askin and the Liberals as a viable alternative government. Askin retained his seat with 72.53%.

The 1965 campaign against the Labor Government—led since April 1964 by Jack Renshaw—a government widely perceived to be tired and devoid of ideas, was notable for being one of Australia's first "presidential-style" campaigns, with Askin being the major focus of campaigning and a main theme of "With Askin You'll Get Action".

He received vigorous support from the newspapers and TV stations owned by Packer. At the May 1965 election, the Liberal/Country Coalition gained 49.8% of the vote to 43.3% to the ALP. While the Liberals took only two seats from Labor, Askin got the support of the two independent members, Douglas Darby (Manly) and Harold Coates (Hartley), giving him enough support to end Labor's 24-year run in power. He officially took office on 1 May, with Charles Cutler of the Country Party as deputy premier.

== Premier of New South Wales ==
The Askin Government was sworn in by the governor of New South Wales, Sir Eric Woodward, on 13 May 1965 at Government House. It was the first to be headed by the Liberal Party since the main non-Labor party in the state adopted the Liberal banner; being one of only three Liberals to win power from Labor. Askin, who served as his own treasurer, heavily involved himself in the business of Government, while also maintaining a range of social agendas and regular outings to the racetrack or Rugby League games. One of the privileges of office was the access to a Ministerial car and personal driver, which became particularly important for Askin, who did not drive. On one occasion when Askin was supposed to drive a new Holden from the factory assembly line during a visit, Askin arranged for his driver, Russ Ferguson, to be hidden on the car floor working the controls while Askin held the wheel.

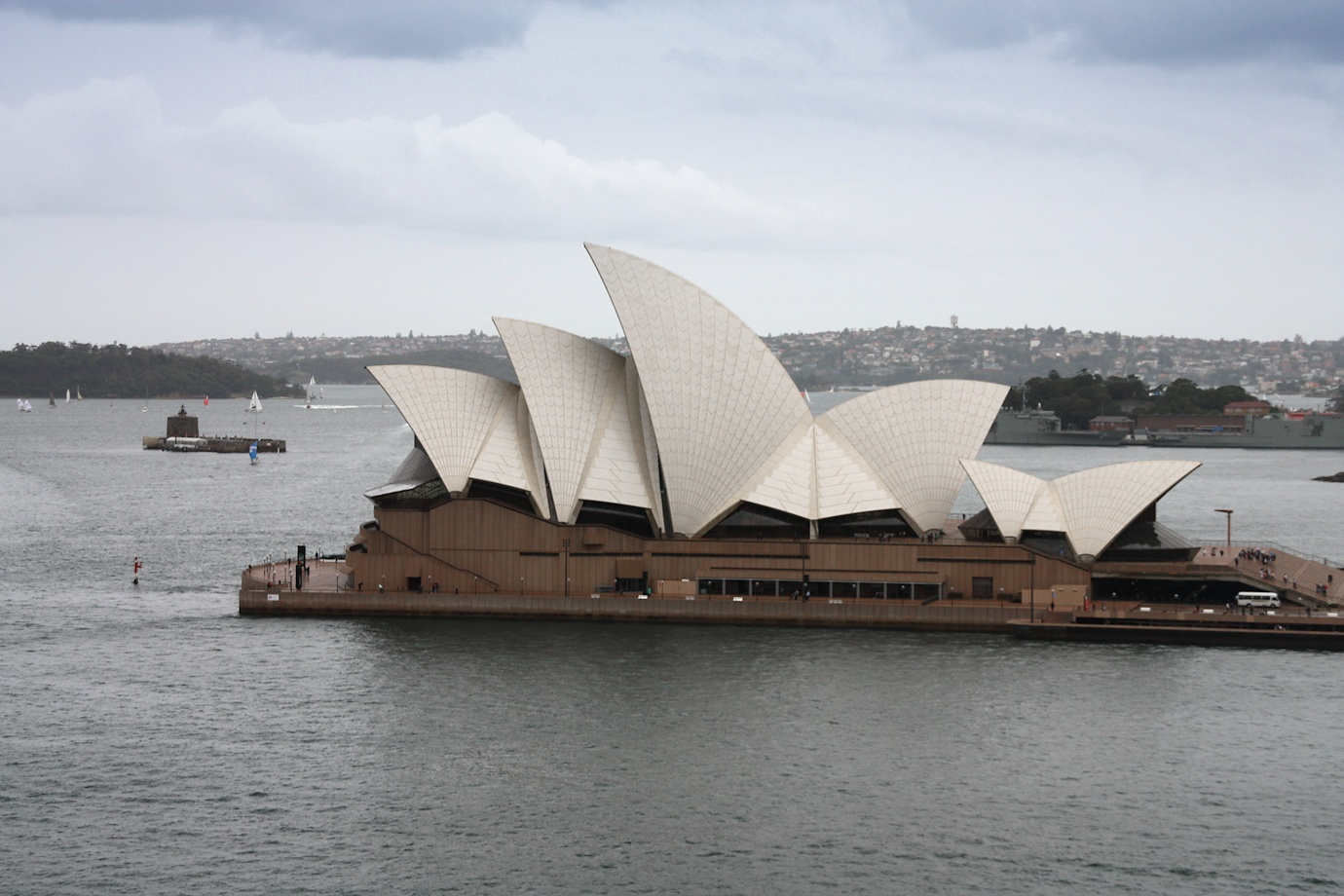
Askin opposed Sydney Opera House construction

Askin's government was marked by strong opposition to an increase in Commonwealth powers, a tough stance on "law and order" issues, laissez-faire economic policies, and aggressive support for industrial and commercial development. At his first Cabinet meeting, Askin restored direct air services between Sydney and Dubbo, and required Jørn Utzon, the Danish architect then working on the Sydney Opera House, to provide a final price and completion date for the Opera House, which had gone past the original estimates for both. His Public Works Minister Davis Hughes began to assert control over the project and demanded that costs be reined in. This brought him into direct conflict with Utzon and in February 1966, after a bitter standoff and the suspension of progress payments by Hughes, Utzon resigned, sparking a major public outcry. Two weeks after the first Government meeting, the Askin Government abolished the tow-away system for Sydney and Newcastle. In 1966 the University of New South Wales awarded him an honorary Doctor of Letters (D.Litt.).

=== Law reform ===
Despite a hostile Legislative Council, an extended drought and various industrial disputes, Askin and his Government passed several reforms. Among them were the removal of trading-hours restrictions on small businesses, abolishing juries for motor accident damage cases, extending the hours for liquor trading, thereby bringing an end to the "Six o'clock swill". The Government also moved into legal and local government reforms, attacking pollution and restoring the previously abolished postal voting rights in state elections. Askin also addressed the demands of the New England New State Movement by holding a referendum in 1967, which was defeated by a large margin.

Many of his government's reforms were due to his minister for justice, John Maddison, and Attorney-General Sir Kenneth McCaw, who initiated the establishment of the Law Reform Commission of New South Wales, the introduction of consumer laws, an ombudsman, legal aid, health labels on cigarette packs, breath-testing of drivers, limits on vehicle emissions, the liberalisation of liquor laws, and compensation for victims of violent crime. There was also a new National Parks and Wildlife Service to assist environment conservation and protection. Despite these positive reforms, Askin's government maintained a brutal prison and corrective regime that was to culminate in the Bathurst Gaol riots in 1970 and 1974.

=== Local government and planning ===
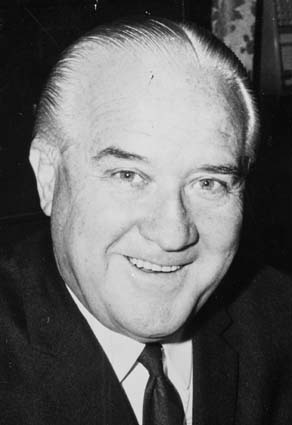
Askin in 1966

Askin, along with his minister for local government, Pat Morton, oversaw the rapid escalation of building development in inner-city Sydney and the central business district, which followed in the wake of his controversial 1967 abolition of Sydney City Council and a redistribution of municipal electoral boundaries that was aimed at reducing the power of the rival Labor Party. On its abolition, Morton commented that it was "essential for Sydney's progress" and replaced the city council with a commission, headed by another former Liberal leader, Vernon Treatt.

The Sydney metropolitan area at the time was marked by increasing strains on state infrastructure and Askin's Government's pro-development stance was largely attributed as an attempt to alleviate these problems. Despite this, the newly established State Planning Authority were continuously criticised for not being totally accountable to the public, particularly as the pro-business Sydney Commissioners worked side by side with the Planning authority to increase developments in the Sydney CBD to their highest levels ever, embodied by the construction of the MLC Centre, the demolition of the Theatre Royal, Sydney and the Australia Hotel. Other controversial schemes proposed by his government were a massive freeway system that was planned to be driven through the hearts of historic inner-city suburbs including Glebe and Newtown and an equally ambitious scheme of 'slum clearance' that would have brought about the wholescale destruction of the historic areas of Woolloomooloo and The Rocks. This eventually culminated in the 1970s Green ban movement led by Unions Leader Jack Mundey, to protect the architectural heritage of Sydney.

=== Second term ===
At the 24 February 1968 election, Askin increased his previously tenuous majority, scoring a six-seat swing against Labor's Renshaw and an overall majority of 12 over the Labor Party and the two Independents. Askin retained his seat with 70.97%. It was the first time since the UAP/Country Coalition won three consecutive elections from 1932 to 1938 that a non-Labor government in New South Wales had been reelected.

In mid-1968 Askin famously became embroiled in a media controversy over the reporting of several words spoken to the United States Chamber of Commerce lunch in Sydney on 23 July 1968 (also the day Opposition Leader Renshaw resigned, to be replaced by Pat Hills), in which he spoke of the October 1966 state visit by United States president Lyndon B. Johnson. Askin had joined Prime Minister Harold Holt, President Johnson and the American ambassador, Ed Clark, in a drive through the Sydney CBD. As Johnson's motorcade drove into Liverpool Street, several anti-Vietnam War protesters, including Graeme Dunstan, threw themselves in front of the car carrying them. As Askin later recalled, a police officer had informed him that some communists were obstructing the route. Askin claimed he had instructed the officer to drag them off. As the car moved on, he then said to Johnson "half-jocularly": "what I ought to have told him was to ride over them", to which Johnson replied "a man after my own heart". At the subsequent luncheon, Askin instead reported that he had said the remark to the police officer, which a journalist attending the event later reported it as "Run over the bastards."

=== Federal relations ===
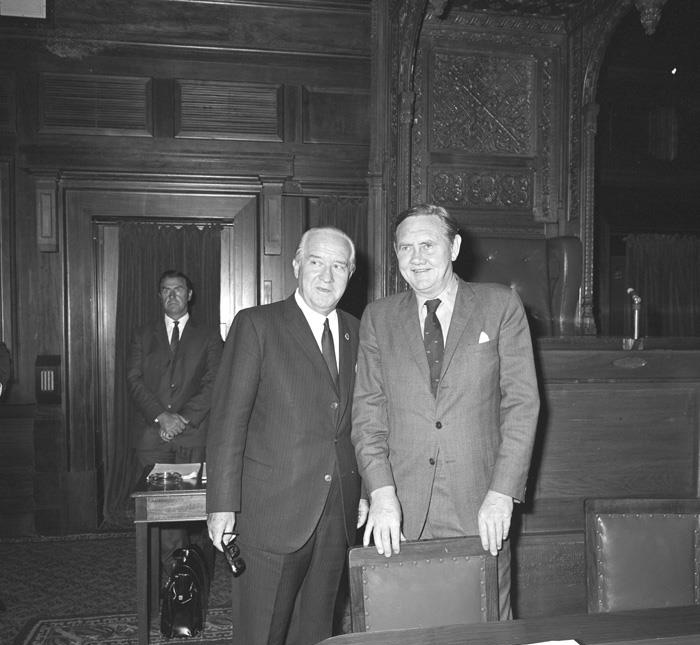
Askin with Prime Minister John Gorton at the Premier's Conference on 4 February 1971. The two were never close.

As Treasurer, Askin focused on the state budget and on Commonwealth-State financial relations. His attitude towards the Commonwealth and the Federal Government was shaped by his first premiers' conference in 1965 when Prime Minister Menzies negotiated with the Victorian premier Henry Bolte to achieve an extra grant of funds for Victoria at the expense of the other states and closed the conference before the other Premiers could object. At subsequent premiers' conferences he opposed the 'centralising' tendencies of Canberra and became a strong advocate of the rights of the states.

With John Gorton becoming prime minister after Holt's death, Askin came into conflict with the Commonwealth Government over Gorton's determination to maintain federal command over taxation and in June 1968 declared that he could veto any form of state taxation. In late 1969, Askin, with Bolte, organised an 'emergency' premiers' conference, without Gorton, to publicise the disadvantages of the States, a move that was partly responsible for the party deposition of Gorton in 1971.

Askin had a greater dislike for Gorton's successor, William McMahon and received financial support from McMahon only when Askin threatened to release a NSW "horror budget" that could damage Federal Liberal voting intentions. However, when McMahon lost the 1972 election to Labor Leader Gough Whitlam, relations between Sydney and Canberra got even worse. Whitlam's centralising economic policies and decision to end legal appeals to the Judicial Committee of the Privy Council drew criticism from Askin.

=== Third and Fourth terms ===
At the 13 February 1971 state election, the Coalition suffered a swing of four seats, but still managed a narrow win against Labor and new leader Pat Hills, taking 49 seats – a bare majority of one – in the expanded 96-seat Legislative Assembly.

Throughout his time as premier, Askin was assisted by Charles Cutler as deputy premier and leader of the Country Party. Cutler served as acting premier at times when Askin was suffering from illness, having suffered two heart attacks in 1969 and 1973. In 1972 the Eastern Orthodox Church of Antioch presented Askin with the Order of St Peter and St Paul for his services to ethnic minorities.

In 1971 Askin changed his name from "Robin" to "Robert" by a deed poll. On 1 January 1972, he was appointed a Knight Commander of the Order of St Michael and St George (KCMG). Later that year, taking advantage of unease at the increasingly erratic Labor government of Gough Whitlam and the increasing economic problems seen to be caused by it, Askin called an early election for 1973. A setback arose for the government in the northern Sydney seat of Gordon, when the Liberal member and education minister, Harry Jago, forgot to lodge a formal nomination of his candidacy. This resulted in the Liberals losing the seat to the Democratic Labor Party before the election took place. Nevertheless, Askin's government went to a record fourth win against the ALP (still led by Pat Hills), increasing the Liberal/Country majority by four seats and making Askin the only major party leader to win four consecutive terms for premier until Neville Wran of the ALP. At this election, Askin ran in Pittwater, essentially a reconfigured version of his old seat of Collaroy, which had been abolished in a redistribution. Pittwater was as safely Liberal as Collaroy, and Askin retained it easily. In 1973 he was appointed an Officer of the Lebanese National Order of the Cedar.

Askin's last term in office was marked by tension between the NSW and Victorian Governments, and by a widespread view that Askin was getting out of touch with the voters. Late in 1974, Askin announced his resignation, and his last intervention was to support his minister for lands, Thomas Lewis, in his bid to be Askin's successor instead of the deputy leader and minister for education, Sir Eric Willis. It was reported that Lewis had offered to upgrade Askin's knighthood from Knight Commander (KCMG) to Knight Grand Cross (GCMG) of the Order of St Michael and St George, while Willis was uncommitted on the topic. In any event, Askin retired from politics in January 1975 and was succeeded by Lewis as premier. On 14 June 1975 he was elevated to Knight Grand Cross, for his service as premier.

The departure of Askin began a turbulent year for the government. Lewis was ousted in a party room coup by Willis in 1976, but Willis only lasted four months before losing the 1976 election to Labor, ending the longest unbroken run for a non-Labor government since World War I.

== Later life ==
Askin's health declined still further after 1975, and he died of heart failure on 9 September 1981 in St Vincent's Hospital, Sydney. The next day, the Sydney Morning Herald editorialised that he was "one of the ablest, most industrious and colourful political leaders of Australia's post-war era".

His state funeral, held on 14 September, was attended by over 1,000 mourners, including Prime Minister Malcolm Fraser, Premier Neville Wran, Mervyn Wood, Justice Lionel Murphy and former NSW Labor Premier and former governor-general Sir William McKell.

== Allegations of corruption ==
There have been persistent allegations that Askin, allegedly assisted by then Police Commissioner Norman Allan, oversaw the creation of a lucrative network of corruption and bribery that involved politicians, public servants, police, and the nascent Sydney organised crime syndicates.

When questioned about his wealth, Askin always attributed it to the salary from his high public office, his frugal lifestyle, good investments and canny punting. After his death the Australian Taxation Office audited his estate and, although it made no finding of criminality, it determined that a substantial part of it came from undisclosed income derived from sources other than shares or gambling.

With Askin's death in 1981, investigative journalists were freed from the threat of legal action under Australia's defamation laws. Stories about his reputed corruption were published almost immediately. Most notable of those was an article that appeared in The National Times co-written by David Marr and David Hickie. Headlined "Askin: friend of organised crime", it was published on the day of Askin's funeral. That was followed by David Hickie's book "The Prince and The Premier", which detailed Askin's long involvement in illegal bookmaking, and allegations that he had received substantial and long-running payoffs from organised crime figures.

In 2007, the centenary of Askin's birth, went largely unnoticed, with the Liberal Party distancing itself from him.

The allegations of corruption against Askin were revived in 2008 when Alan Saffron, the son of the late Sydney crime boss Abe Saffron, published a biography of his father in which he alleged that Saffron had paid bribes to major public officials, including Askin, former police commissioner Norman Allan, and other leading figures, whom he claimed he could not name because they were still alive. Alan Saffron alleged that his father made payments of between A$5000 and $10,000 per week to both men over many years, that Askin and Allan both visited Saffron's office on several occasions, that Allan also visited the Saffron family home, and that Abe Saffron paid for an all-expenses overseas trip for Allan and a young female "friend". He also alleged that, later in Askin's premiership, Abe Saffron became the "bagman" for Sydney's illegal liquor and prostitution rackets, and most illegal gambling activities, collecting payoffs that were then passed to Askin, Allan and others, in return for which his father was completely protected.

== See also ==
- Askin–Cutler ministry (1965–1968)
- Askin–Cutler ministry (1968–1969)
- Askin–Cutler ministry (1969–1971)
- Askin–Cutler ministry (1971–1973)
- Askin–Cutler ministry (1973)
- Askin–Cutler ministry (1973–1975)

== Bibliography ==
- Guide to Sydney Crime
- Hancock, Ian (2006). Clune, David; Turner, Ken (eds.). The Premiers of New South Wales 1856–2005: Volume 2, 1901–2005. Sydney: Federation Press. pp. 347–372. ISBN 978-1-86287-551-7.
- McMullin, Ross (1991). The Light on the Hill: The Australian Labor Party 1891–1991. Oxford University Press. ISBN 0-19-554966-X.
- Hancock, Ian (2007). The Liberals: The NSW Division 1945–2000. Sydney: Federation Press. ISBN 978-1-86287-659-0.
- Hogan, Michael; Clune, David, eds. (2001). The people's choice : electoral politics in twentieth century New South Wales, volumes two and three. Parliament of New South Wales; University of Sydney. ISBN 0909907382.
- Loughnan, Paul (2020). Sir Robert Askin. Australian Biographical Monographs. Vol. 9. Redland Bay, Qld: Connor Court Publishing. ISBN 9781922449368.

New South Wales Legislative Assembly
| New district | Member for Collaroy; 1950–1973 | District abolished |
| New district | Member for Pittwater; 1973–1975 | Succeeded by Bruce Webster |
Party political offices
| Preceded by Walter Howarth | Deputy Leader of the New South Wales Liberal Party; 1954–1959 | Succeeded by Eric Willis |
| Preceded by Pat Morton | Leader of the New South Wales Liberal Party; 1959–1975 | Succeeded by Thomas Lewis |
Political offices
| Preceded by Pat Morton | Leader of the Opposition of New South Wales; 1959–1965 | Succeeded by Jack Renshaw |
| Preceded by Jack Renshaw | Premier of New South Wales; 1965–1975 | Succeeded by Tom Lewis |
| Preceded by Jack Renshaw | Treasurer of New South Wales; 1965–1975 | Succeeded by Tom Lewis |
