= Jim Longley =

Australian politician

James Alan Longley (born 28 July 1958) is an Australian former politician and banking executive. As a member of the Liberal Party, he served as the Member of Parliament for Pittwater in the New South Wales Legislative Assembly from 1986 to 1996. During his tenure in the assembly, he was Minister for Community Services, Minister for Aboriginal Affairs, and Minister for the Ageing.

== Education and personal life ==
Longley was born in Sydney, New South Wales (NSW), and attended Mona Vale Primary School, Sydney Grammar Preparatory School, Narrabeen High School, and St Andrew's Cathedral School. He received his Bachelor of Economics from the University of Sydney, a Master's degree from Macquarie University, and also attended the University of Washington in the United States.

Longley is a Fellow of the Society of Certified Practising Accountants, Fellow of the Australian Institute of Company Directors and a Fellow of the Australian Institute of Management. Before entering politics, he was a banking executive.

In September 2017 he announced he was resigning from his position as Deputy Secretary of Ageing, Disability and Home Care to pursue a two-year post graduate degree in the US.

== Political career ==
Longley began his political career in 1974, when he joined the Liberal Party. In 1978 he founded the Pittwater Young Liberals and served as their President. He was also President of the Mackellar Federal Electoral Council.

On 31 May 1986 Longley was elected to the New South Wales Legislative Assembly, and soon thereafter was appointed the Acting Shadow Minister for Finance. In 1992, he was appointed Minister for Community Services and Assistant Minister for Health, and in late 1993 added Aboriginal Affairs and Ageing to his portfolio. After the Liberal-led minority coalition lost government in March 1995, he served for a year in Opposition before resigning on 20 March 1996, after nearly ten years in the Assembly.

== Post political career ==
After his resignation from Parliament in 1996 until late 2000, Longley was the Chief Executive Officer of Anglican Retirement Villages in the Diocese of Sydney, after which he took up a government-liaison role with the Commonwealth Bank as General Manager/Executive Vice President Government Finance. In July 2012, he was appointed Deputy Secretary of Ageing, Disability and Home Care (ADHC), within the NSW Department of Family and Community Services.

During 2017, two articles in the Sydney Morning Herald noted that Longley was one of 10 directors of RSL LifeCare associated with allegations of misuse of funds, but no subsequent action has been taken against him.

New South Wales Legislative Assembly
Preceded by Max Smith	Member for Pittwater; 1986 – 1996	Succeeded by John Brogden
