= List of Anglican churches in the Diocese of Sydney =

This is a list of churches in the Anglican Diocese of Sydney. This includes physical church buildings even if they do not currently have congregations meeting. If a congregation meets in a shared space such as a school hall, it should only be listed if it is the primary meeting site for a parish.

== Current churches ==
Name	Suburb	Street Address	Year of Foundation	Current Rector	Mission Area	Picture	Comment
St Andrew's	Abbotsford	Cnr Byrne Avenue & Sibbick Street		Trevor Young	Inner West		
St Martin's	Allambie Heights	28 Libya Crescent		Stuart Milne	Warringah		Parish of Christ Church Northern Beaches
Village Church (St Aidan’s)	Annandale	Cnr Booth Street & Johnston Street	1894	Dominic Steele	Inner West		
St Columb's	Arcadia	136 Arcadia Road			Hills and Hawkesbury		ll District Anglican Church
Bayside (St David's)	Arncliffe	54 Forest Road		Zachary Veron	St George		
St Basil's	Artarmon	6 Broughton Street		David Lim	Lower North Shore		
St Matthew's	Ashbury	Leith Street Ashbury			Inner West		
St John the Baptist’s (Christ Church Inner West)	Ashfield	Alt Street	1840	Andrew Katay	Inner West		Part of Christ Church Inner West
St John's	Asquith	6 Royston Parade	1921	Brian Heath	Upper North Shore		
St Phillip's	Auburn	48 Hall Street			Parramatta		
St Thomas'	Auburn	3A Provincial Street			Parramatta		
All Saints'	Austinmer	Moore Street		Nathan Sandon	Wollongong		Austinmer and Thirroul Anglican Churches
St Mark's	Avalon	4 Kevin Avenue		Sturt Young	Warringah		Parish of Barrenjoey Churches
All Saints'	Balgowlah	18 Boyle Street		vacant	Warringah		
St Mary's	Balmain	85 Darling Street		David Coy	Sydney City		Low Church
St Paul's	Bankstown	461 Chapel Road		John Bartik	Bankstown		
Holy Trinity	Baulkham Hills	295 Windsor Road	1901	Craig oliffe	Hills and Hawkesbury		
Holy Trinity	Beacon Hill	9 Janice Place		Dave Lanham	Warringah		
St John's	Beecroft	9 Chapman Avenue		James Smith	Ryde		
St Stephen's	Bellevue Hill	Bellevue Park Road		Richard Lane	Eastern Suburbs		
St Alban's	Belmore	722 Canterbury Road		David Wallace	Marrickville		
St Stephen's	Belrose	16 Lockwood Avenue		Rev. Patterson	Warringah		
St James'	Berala	19 Crawford Street		Mike Doyle	Parramatta		Associated with St Paul's Carlingford
St Mark's	Berowra	18–20 Berowra Waters Road		Ian Millican	Upper North Shore		
St Bede’s	Beverly Hills	119 Morgan Street		Tim Mildenhall	St George		Combined with St Thomas' Kingsgrove
Christ Church	Bexley	Albyn Street		Phil Colgan	St George		St George North Anglican Church
St George North	Bexley, Bexley North & Carlton				St George		
St John's	Birchgrove	Birchgrove Road	1882	James Butt	Sydney City		High Church
St Aidan's	Blackheath	2–8 Hat Hill Road		Tim McIver	Blue Mountains		Part of the Anglican Parish of Blackheath
Christ Church	Blacktown	19 Richmond Road			Blacktown-Penrith		
St Martin's	Blakehurst	9 Centre Street		Paul Lucas	St George		
St David's	Blaxland	16 Taringha Street		Ken Noakes	Blue Mountains		Part of Lower Mountains Anglican Parish
St Matthew's	Bondi	34 Ocean Street		Martin Morgan	Eastern Suburbs		
St Andrew's	Bondi Beach	60 Wairoa Avenue		Martin Morgan	Eastern Suburbs		
Christ Church	Bong Bong	Cnr Highlands Way & Church Street	1845	Dean Reilly	Southern Highlands		
St Barnabas'	Bossley Park	80 Quarry Road		Stephen Shead	Liverpool		Part of Fairfield with Bossley Park Parish
St Matthew's	Botany	Botany Road		Kurt Peters	Eastern Suburbs		
St Jude's	Bowral	38 Bendooley Street		Gavin Perkins	Southern Highlands		
St Mark's	Brighton-Le-Sands	1 Trafalgar Street		Steve Bryant	St George		
St Barnabas'	Broadway	Broadway	1858	Michael Paget	Sydney City		
Bulli Anglican Church	Bulli	66 Park Road		Michael Williamson	Wollongong		
Holy Trinity	Bundanoon	15 Church Street		Jeremy Tonks	Southern Highlands		
St Paul's	Burwood	207 Burwood Road	1891	James Collins	Inner West		
Cabramatta Anglican Church	Cabramatta	42 Cumberland Street		Joseph Thiem	Liverpool		
St John's	Camden	2 Menangle Road	1840	Tony Galea	Camden-Campbelltown		
All Saints'	Cammeray	5-7 Carter Street		Nathan Walter	Lower North Shore		
St Peter's	Campbelltown	Howe Street	1823	Jason Veitch	Camden-Campbelltown		
St John's	Campsie	71 Anglo Road			Marrickville		
St Paul's	Canterbury	33 Church Street	1860	Stephen Gardner	Marrickville		
St Phil's	Caringbah	402 Port Hacking Road		Sutherland			
St Paul's Anglican Church	Carlingford	Cnr Moseley Street & Vickery Avenue	1850	Raj Gupta	Hills and Hawkesbury		
St Cuthbert's	Carlton South	34 Park Road		vacant	St George		
St Paul's	Castle Hill	421 Old Northern Road	1860s	Bruce Stanley	Hills and Hawkesbury		
St Paul's	Chatswood	1 View Street		Steve Jeffrey	Lower North Shore		
Cherrybrook Anglican Church	Cherrybrook	Shepards Lane			Hills and Hawkesbury		
St John Mark's	Chester Hill	125 Proctor Parade			Bankstown		
Christ Church St Laurence	City (Sydney CBD)	812 George Street	1839	Rev'd Dr Daniel Dries	Sydney City		
St James' Church, Sydney	City (Sydney CBD)	173 King Street	1819	Fr Christopher Waterhouse	Sydney City		
St Andrew's Cathedral	City (Sydney CBD)	Sydney Square	1868	Sandy Grant (Dean)	Sydney City		Diocesan Cathedral
Holy Trinity (Church Hill)	City (Millers Point, Sydney)	60 Lower Fort Street	1840	Justin Moffatt	Sydney City		
St Philip's (Church Hill)	City (Sydney CBD)	3 York Street	1802	Justin Moffatt	Sydney City		
St Luke's	Clovelly	Arden Street	1923	Dave Rogers	Eastern Suburbs		
St Paul's	Cobbitty	St Paul Cobbity Road	1828	Jim Douglass	Camden-Campbelltown		
St Paul's	Colo Vale	Church Avenue	1884	Richard Mills	Southern Highlands		Part of Mittagong Anglican Church
St Luke's	Concord	17 Burton Street	1859	Cliff Stratton	Inner West		
Holy Trinity & St Mary's	Concord	9 Turner Avenue		Chris Chardon	Inner West		
St Clements	Condell Park	195 Edgar Street		Ray Vassallo	Bankstown	part of Yagoona and Condell Park Anglican	
St Nicholas'	Coogee	123 Brook Street	1887	Craig Segaert	Eastern Suburbs		
St Paul's	South Coogee	21 Nymboida Street			Eastern Suburbs		
St Peter's	Cremorne	29 Waters Road		Andy Bleach	Lower North Shore		
Norwest Anglican	Crestwood	19 Chapel Lane, Baulkham Hills		Peter Stedman	Hills and Hawkesbury		
St Andrew's	Cronulla	1A St Andrews Place		Greg Ball	Sutherland		
St James'	Croydon	2 Highbury Street		Alan Lukabyo	Inner West		
St Luke's	Dapto	Prince Edward Drive	1882	vacant	Wollongong		
St John's	Darlinghurst	120 Darlinghurst Road	1849	Rev Richard Glover	Wentworth		
Rough Edges	Darlinghurst	231 Victoria Street	1996	Rev Richard Glover			
St Mark's	Darling Point	53 Darling Point Road		Rev Dr Michael Jensen	Eastern Suburbs		
St John's	Dee Why	87 Oaks Avenue		Steven Salmon	Warringah		
St Mary's Anglican Church	Denham Court	30 Church Road	1838	Richard Mills	Camden-Campbelltown		
St Dunstan's	Denistone East	132 North Road, Eastwood		Fergus Semler	Ryde		
St John's	Doonside	17a Cameron Street		Jerryl Lowe	Blacktown-Penrith		
St Bede's	Drummoyne	14 College Street		Matt Stedman	Inner West		
Holy Trinity	Dulwich Hill	11 Herbert Street	1886	Simon Keith	Sydney City		
St Jude's	Dural	965 Old Northern Road	1846	Dougal Michie	Hills and Hawkesbury		
Eagle Vale Anglican	Eagle Vale	1 Emerald Drive		vacant	Liverpool		
St George's	Earlwood	92 Minnamorra Avenue		Brendan McLaughlin	Marrickville		
St Peter's	East Lindfield	110 Tryon Road		Steve Layson	Upper North Shore		
St Edmund's (Wild Street)	Eastgardens/Pagewood	18 Holden Street Maroubra		Rod Cocking	Eastern Suburbs		
St Stephen's	Eastlakes	6 Harry Street		Adam Clark	Eastern Suburbs		
St Philip's	Eastwood	29 Clanalpine Street	1907	Eric Cheung	Ryde		
St Paul's	Emu Plains	26 Short Street			Blacktown-Penrith		
St Thomas'	Enfield	53 Coronation Parade		Kevin Kim	Inner West		
St George's	Engadine	1/10 Waratah Road			Sutherland		
St Luke's	Enmore/Stanmore	11 Stanmore Road			Sydney City		High Church
St Alban's	Epping	3 Pembroke Street		Ross Nicholson	Ryde		
All Saints'	North Epping	295 Malton Road		Anton Marquez	Ryde		
St Mark's	Ermington	471 Kissing Point Road	1881	Eric Cheung	Ryde		
Holy Trinity	Erskineville	Rochford Street		Andrew Errington	Inner West		
St Aidan's	Exeter	5 Exeter Road		Jeremy Tonks	Southern Highlands		
St Barnabas'	Fairfield	10 Frederick Street		Stephen Shead	Liverpool		Part of Fairfield with Bossley Park Parish
St Barnabas' (The Hut)	Fairfield West	296 Hamilton Road		Stephen Shead	Liverpool		Part of Fairfield with Bossley Park Parish
Fairy Meadow Anglican Church	Fairy Meadow	1 Jardine Street		Roger Fitzhardinge	Wollongong		
Figtree Anglican Church	Figtree	4-10 Gibsons Road		Robin Kinstead	Wollongong		
St Alban's (Christ Church Inner West)	Five Dock	173 Great North Road		Andrew Katay	Inner West		Part of Christ Church Inner West
St David's	Forestville	697 Warringah Road		Jon Kwan	Warringah		
St Mark's	Freemans Reach	355 Kurmond Road		Craig Hamilton	Hills and Hawkesbury		
St Alban's	Frenchs Forest	67 Bantry Bay Road		Dave Lanham	Warringah		
St Martin's	Georges Hall	176 Birdwood Road		Gary Bennetts	Bankstown		
St George's	Gerringong	Fern Street		Steven Layson	Wollongong		
Christ Church	Gladesville	4 Jordan Street		David Mears	Ryde		
St John's	Glebe	138a Glebe Point Road			Sydney City		
St Peter's	Glenbrook	Corner of Wascoe & Raymond Streets		Ken Noakes	Blue Mountains		Part of Lower Mountains Anglican Parish
Emmanuel	Glenhaven	31 Glenhaven Road		Hayden Smith	Upper North Shore		Glenhaven Parish
Grace West Anglican Church	Glenmore Park	16 William Howell Drive		Chris Braga	Blacktown-Penrith		
St John's	Gordon	754 Pacific Highway		vacant	Upper North Shore		
St Mark's	Granville	39 Jamieson Street		Tallis Tien	Parramatta		
St Barnabas	Greenacre	80 Pandora Street			Bankstown		
St Marks	Greendale	1120 Greendale Road			Blacktown-Penrith		
St Giles'	Greenwich	6 Greendale Street		Eric Percival	Lower North Shore		
St Mary's	Guildford	2 Bolton Street		Tim Booker	Parramatta		
St Paul and St Barnabas'	Gymea	131 Gymea Bay Road		David Fell	Sutherland		
St Oswald's	Haberfield	10 Dickson Street		Rev Angus Courtney	Inner West		
St Mark's	Harbord	Lawrence Street		Terry Bowers	Warringah		
Harrington Park Anglican	Harrington Park	Sir Warwick Fairfax Avenue	2007	Jono Squire	Camden-Campbelltown		
St Paul's	Harris Park	13 Crown Street		Owen Goddard	Parramatta		
All Saints'	Helensburgh	77 Parkes Street	1881	Steve Carlisle	Sutherland		
St Peter's	Hornsby	207 Pacific Highway	1923	Brian Hall	Upper North Shore		
St Luke's	Hornsby Heights	157 Galston Road		Michael Begbie	Upper North Shore		
Hoxton Park Anglican Church	Hoxton Park	Cnr Latrobe & Cowpasture Roads, West Hoxton	1992	David Clarke	Liverpool		
All Saints'	Hunters Hill	2 Ambrose Street		Martin B. Robinson (acting)	Ryde		
St George's	Hurstville	2 The Avenue (Hall for most English services; Main Building for Chinese and early English service)		Brian Tung	St George		
St Aidan's	Hurstville Grove	127 Hillcrest Avenue	1927	Andrew West	St George		aka Grove Church, originally known as St James, Hurstville Grove
Saints Anglican	South Hurstville/Blakehurst	15 The Mall/100 Stuart St	1919	Ross Ryan	St George		Formerly St Mark's/Blakehurst Anglican
St Barnabas'	Ingleburn	84–89 Cumberland Road		Joe Wiltshire	Camden-Campbelltown		
Church of the Resurrection	Jamberoo	45 Churchill Street	1857	Jodie McNeill	Wollongong		
St Clement's	Jannali	83 Wattle Road		Neil Fitzpatrick	Sutherland		
St Hilda's	Katoomba	Katoomba Street		Murray Colville	Blue Mountains		
St John's	Keiraville	Cnr Eastern & Moore Streets		Peter Hutchinson	Wollongong		
St Stephen's	Kellyville	45 President Road		vacant	Hills and Hawkesbury		
St Martin's	Kensington	103 Todman Avenue		Adam Clark	Eastern Suburbs		
Christ Church	Kenthurst	28 Pitt Town Road			Hills and Hawkesbury		
St Martin's	Killara	Arnold Street		Matthew Heazlewood	Upper North Shore		
Holy Trinity	Kingsford	25 Sturt Street			Eastern Suburbs		
St Thomas'	Kingsgrove	4 Morgan Street			St George		Combined with Beverly Hills
St Philip's	Kingswood	32 Bringelly Road	1898		Blacktown-Penrith		
Church by the Bridge (St John's)	Kirribilli	2 Bligh Street		Paul Dale	Lower North Shore		formerly St John's
St Paul's	Kogarah	57 Princes Highway			St George		
St Andrew's	Lakemba	154 Lakemba Street		David Wallace	Marrickville		
St Clement's	Lalor Park	Freeman Street			Blacktown-Penrith		
St Andrew's	Lane Cove	Rosenthal Avenue		Darren Waters	Lower North Shore		
Emmanuel	Lawson	Honour Avenue		Tom Melbourne	Blue Mountains	aka Central Villages Anglican Church	
All Souls'	Leichhardt	126 Norton Street			Inner West		
St Alban's	Leura	Megalong Street		James Delanty	Blue Mountains		
	Lidcombe/Berala	1A Mark Street			Parramatta		
All Saints'	Lindfield	11 Moore Avenue			Upper North Shore		
St Alban's	Lindfield	7 Tryon Road			Upper North Shore		
St Paul's	Lithgow	Railway Parade & Roy Street			Blue Mountains		
St Luke's	Liverpool	156 Northumberland Street	1818	Stuart Pearson	Liverpool		
Holy Trinity Church	Liverpool South	152 Graham Avenue			Liverpool		
St Aidan's	Longueville	37 Arabella Street			Lower North Shore		
St James'	Luddenham	Northern Road	1871	Matt Olliffe	Blacktown-Penrith		
St Stephen's	Lugarno	3A Old Forest Road	1959		St George		
	Macquarie Fields	32 Edgar Street			Camden-Campbelltown		
St Mark's	Malabar	Franklin Street		Gav Poole	Eastern Suburbs		
St Matthew's	Manly	The Corso		Bruce Clarke	Warringah		
St Peter's	Manly Vale	3 King Street		Stuart Milne	Warringah		Parish of Christ Church Northern Beaches
St John's	Maroubra	339A Maroubra Road		Mike Allen	Eastern Suburbs		
St Clements, Marrickville Rd Church	Marrickville	90 Petersham Road		Peter De Salis	Marrickville		
St Paul's	Menai	Broughton Place, Barden Ridge		Bruce Dingwall	Sutherland		
St James'	Menangle	131 Menangle Road		Esmond Lau			
St Anne's	Merrylands	4 Denmark Street			Parramatta		
Greystanes – Merrylands West Anglican	Merrylands West/Greystanes	11 Ridge Street			Parramatta		
Minchinbury Church (St John's)	Minchinbury	86 Rupertswood Road, Rooty Hill		Mike Smith	Blacktown-Penrith		
St James'	Minto	2 Redfern Road		Chris Hanger	Camden-Campbelltown		
St Luke's	Miranda	Jackson Avenue		Brett Middleton	Sutherland		
St Stephen's	Mittagong	Cnr Main & Station Streets	1878	Richard Mills	Southern Highlands		
St John's	Mona Vale	1624 Pittwater Road		John Reid	Warringah		
St Thomas'	Moorebank	68 Lucas Avenue		Stephen Cook	Liverpool		
Crosslight Anglican	Mortdale/Peakhurst	110 Morts Road/Peakhurst South Public School		Stuart Maze	St George		formerly Christ Church/Church at the Peak
St Clement's	Mosman	144 Raglan Street		Michael Crichton	Lower North Shore		
St Luke's	Mosman	Cnr Ourimbah Road & Heydon Street	1891	Dr Max Wood	Lower North Shore		
St James'	Mount Druitt	89 Sydney Street, Oxley Park			Blacktown-Penrith		
The Soldiers and Miners Memorial Church	Mount Kembla		1858	Robin Kinstead	Wollongong		built as memorial to the 1902 mine disaster
Mt Riverview Anglican	Mount Riverview	159 Rusden Road		Ken Noakes	Blue Mountains		Part of Lower Mountains Anglican Parish
St Thomas'	Mulgoa	St Thomas' Road	1838	Matt Olliffe	Blacktown-Penrith		
St Thomas'	Narellan	1A Wilson Crescent	1839		Camden-Campbelltown		
St Cuthbert's	Naremburn	205 Willoughby Road		Nathan Walter	Lower North Shore		Part of Naremburn Cammeray Anglican Church
St Faith's	Narrabeen	5–9 Clarke Street		Ben Molyneux	Warringah		
St Augustine's	Neutral Bay	75 Shellcove Road		Paul Dale	Lower North Shore		
St Stephen's	Newtown	189 Church Street		Andrew Errington	Inner West		
St Stephen's	Normanhurst	2 Kenley Road		Baden Stace	Upper North Shore		
St Paul's	North Rocks	North Rocks Public School, 359 North Rocks Road		Gary Koo	Hills and Hawkesbury		Part of St. Paul's Carlingford
St John's	North Ryde	152 Coxs Road		John Chappell	Ryde		
St Thomas'	North Sydney	McLaren Street		Micky Mantle	Lower North Shore		
Christ Church	North Sydney	28 Lavender Street		Lachlan Edwards	Lower North Shore		
St Mark's	Northbridge	17 Tunks Street		Scott Petty	Lower North Shore		
St Luke's	Northmead	6 Thomas Street	1970	Adrian Russell	Hills and Hawkesbury		
St Andrew's	Oak Flats	35 Fisher Street	1951	Sam Purcell	Wollongong		
St Mark's	Oakhurst/Plumpton	95 Hyatts Road			Blacktown-Penrith		
St Paul's	Oatley	65 Rosa Street		Craig Olliffe	St George		
All Saints'	Oatley West	54 Woronora Parade		Stephen Anderson	St George		
St George's	Paddington	245 Glenmore Road		Rev Stuart Robinson	Eastern Suburbs		
St Matthias'	Centennial Park	8 Church Place		Rev Chase Kuhn	Eastern Suburbs		
St John's	Padstow	102 Iberia Street		Richard Blight	Bankstown		
St David's	Palm Beach	107 Barrenjoey Road		Sturt Young	Warringah		Parish of Barrenjoey Churches
Panania Anglican	Panania/Milperra	4–6 Lambeth Street		Jon Guyer	Bankstown		Milperra site closed in 2003.
All Saint's	North Parramatta	Elizabeth Street		Owen Goddard	Parramatta		
St John's Cathedral	Parramatta	187 Church Street	1792	Bruce Morrison	Parramatta		Cathedral
St Mark's	Pennant Hills	Rosemount Avenue		Craig Schafer	Upper North Shore		
St Stephen's	Penrith	254 High Street			Blacktown-Penrith		
St John's	Penshurst	Carrington Street			St George		
All Saints'	Petersham	325 Stanmore Road			Inner West		
St Mark's	Picton	Menangle Street West	1850		Southern Highlands		
St James	Pitt Town	Bathurst Street		Craig Hamilton	Hills and Hawkesbury		
St Saviours	Punchbowl	1359 Canterbury Road			St George		
St Chad's	Putney	Delange Street		David Mears	Ryde		
St Swithun's	Pymble	2A Telegraph Road		Stuart Holman	Upper North Shore		
Life Anglican Church Quakers Hill	Quakers Hill	4 Samuel Place		Geoff Bates	Hills and Hawkesbury		
St Jude's	Randwick	106 Avoca Street		Andrew Schmidt	Eastern Suburbs		
St Paul's	Redfern	Cleveland Street	1855		Sydney City		
South Sydney Parish (St Saviour's)	Redfern	119 Young Street			Sydney City		
St Luke's	Regents Park	Kingsland Road			Bankstown		
St Mark's	Revesby	91 The River Road			Bankstown		
St Peter's	Richmond	384 Windsor Street		Rick Hall	Hills and Hawkesbury		
New Light Anglican Church	Riverstone	19 Elizabeth Street	1885	Daniel Walmsley	Hills and Hawkesbury		Parish of Riverstone. Oringally St. Pauls Anglican Church Riverstone
Riverwood Anglican Church	Riverwood	9 Littleton Street		Vincent Chan	St George		
	Rockdale				St George		
St Michael the Archangel	Rookwood				Parramatta		
All Souls	Rookwood				Parramatta		
MBM (St Alban's)	Rooty Hill	20 Westminster Street		Rev Malcolm Gill	Blacktown-Penrith		
St Andrew's	Roseville	1 Bancroft Avenue	1935	Rev James Smith	Upper North Shore		
St Barnabas'	Roseville East	30 William Street			Upper North Shore		
Christ Church	Rouse Hill	2 Adelphi Street		Graeme Howells	Hills and Hawkesbury		
St Andrew's	Russell Lea				Inner West		
St Anne's	Ryde	44 Church Street	1826	Greg Burke	Ryde		
St Mark's	Sadleir	Spica Street		Dave Morgan	Liverpool		
Church of The Risen Christ	St Clair	54–58 Coonawarra Drive			Blacktown-Penrith		
Christ Church	St Ives	1 Cowan Road	1909	Nigel Fortescue	Upper North Shore		
Parish of Smithfield Road	St Johns Park	73 Edensor Road	1925	Stuart Milne	Liverpool		
St Marys Magdalene	St Marys	24 King Street	1840	Trent Sutcliffe	Blacktown-Penrith		
St Peter's	St Peters	187 Princes Highway		Andrew Bruce	Sydney City		
St Andrew's	Sans Souci	325 Rocky Point Road		Trevor Young	St George		
St Paul's	Seaforth	1 Frenchs Forest Road		Richard Wenden	Warringah		
St Peter's	Seven Hills	97 Best Road		Mark Williamson	Blacktown-Penrith		
Shellharbour City Church	Shellharbour			Jon Thorpe	Wollongong		
All Saint's	Silverdale	Silverdale Road	1906	Matt Olliffe	Blacktown-Penrith		
Christ Church	Springwood	345 Great Western Highway	1889	Steve Young	Blue Mountains		Part of Anglican Churches Springwood
The Factory (aka Ministry Centre)	Springwood	28 Lawson Road	2003	Steve Young	Blue Mountains		Part of Anglican Churches Springwood
Stanhope Anglican Church	Stanhope Gardens			Steve Reimer	Hills and Hawkesbury		
St Anne's	Strathfield	42 Homebush Road			Inner West		
St Andrew's	Summer Hill	2A Henson Street		Rev Steve Frederick	Inner West		
St Michael's	Surry Hills	Cnr Flinders & Albion Streets		Toby Neal	Sydney City		Vine Church
St John's	Sutherland	43A Belmont Street		Tom Hargreaves	Sutherland		
All Saints'	Sutton Forest	7320 Illawarra Highway		Jeremy Tonks	Southern Highlands		
Sylvania Anglican	Sylvania	98 Holt Road		Mark Charleston	Sutherland		
St Stephen's	Tallong	640 Highland Way		Jeremy Tonks	Southern Highlands		
St Stephen's	Telopea	24 Lord Avenue		Alistair Seabrook	Parramatta		
St Paul's	Terrey Hills	Cnr Yulong & McCarrs Creek Roads		Scott Tarrant	Upper North Shore		Parish of Christ Church St Ives
St David's	Thirroul	Roxburgh Avenue		Nathan Sandon	Wollongong		Austinmer and Thirroul Anglican Churches
St Mary's	Toongabbie	46 Binalong Road		Mike Hastie	Parramatta		
St James'	Turramurra	King Street			Upper North Shore		
St Phillip's	South Turramurra	1–3 Parkinson Avenue			Upper North Shore		
Wentworth Memorial Church	Vaucluse	32B Fitzwilliam Road	1875		Eastern Suburbs		
St Michaels	Vaucluse/Rose Bay	Gilliver Avenue		Rev Matt Aroney	Eastern Suburbs		
St Andrew's	Wahroonga	2 Water Street		Andrew Rees	Upper North Shore		
St Paul's	Wahroonga	Pearce's Corner		Andrew Rees	Upper North Shore		
All Saints	Waitara	34 Palmerston Road		Martin Kemp	Upper North Shore		
St Paul's	Warragamba	Cnr Weir Road & Fourth Street	1961	Matt Olliffe	Blacktown-Penrith		
Warriewood Anglican	Warriewood	6–14 Macpherson Street		Ben Molyneux	Warringah	part of St Faith's Narrabeen Parish	
St Peter's	Watsons Bay	331 Old South Head Road		Rev Matt Aroney	Eastern Suburbs		
St Mary's	Waverley	240 Birrell Street	19 May 1864	Martin Morgan	Eastern Suburbs		
Holy Trinity	Wentworth Falls	17 Armstrong Street			Blue Mountains		
St Paul's	Wentworthville	18 Pritchard Street		Dave Mistal	Parramatta		
St Matthew's	West Pennant Hills	Cnr Castle Hill & New Line Roads			Hills and Hawkesbury		
St Matthew's	West Pymble	2 Eppleston Place		Dr. Antony Barraclough	Upper North Shore		
St Columb's	West Ryde	14 Bellevue Avenue		Matthew Whitfield	Ryde		
St Barnabas'	Westmead	75 Hawkesbury Road		George Kazogolo	Parramatta		
St John's	Wilberforce	43 Macquarie Road		David Esdale	Hills and Hawkesbury		
St Stephen's	Willoughby	211 Mowbray Road		Prashanth Colombage	Lower North Shore		
St John's	Willoughby East	Cnr Warrane Road & McClelland Street		Tony Wright	Lower North Shore		
St Matthew's	Windsor	5 Moses Street	1817	Chris Jones	Hills and Hawkesbury		
St George's	Winmalee	349 Hawkesbury Road		Steve Young	Blue Mountains		Part of Anglican Churches Springwood
St Michael's	Wollongong	Church Street	1859	Mark Smith	Wollongong		Pro-cathedral
All Saints'	Woollahra	85 Ocean Street		Rev Marcelo Morbelli	Eastern Suburbs		
St Marks	Yagoona	213 Auburn Road		Ray Vassallo	Bankstown	part of Yagoona and Condell Park Anglican	

== Former churches ==
Name	Suburb	Street Address	Year of Foundation	Mission Area	Picture	Comment
St Andrew's	Dundas	7 St Andrews Place		Parramatta		As of June 2023, closed
St Bartholomew's	Prospect	Ponds Road	1841			
St Andrew's Anglican Church, Seven Hills	Seven Hills	Seven Hills Road	1880			

== See also ==
- List of Anglican churches
