= Naremburn Cammeray Anglican Church =

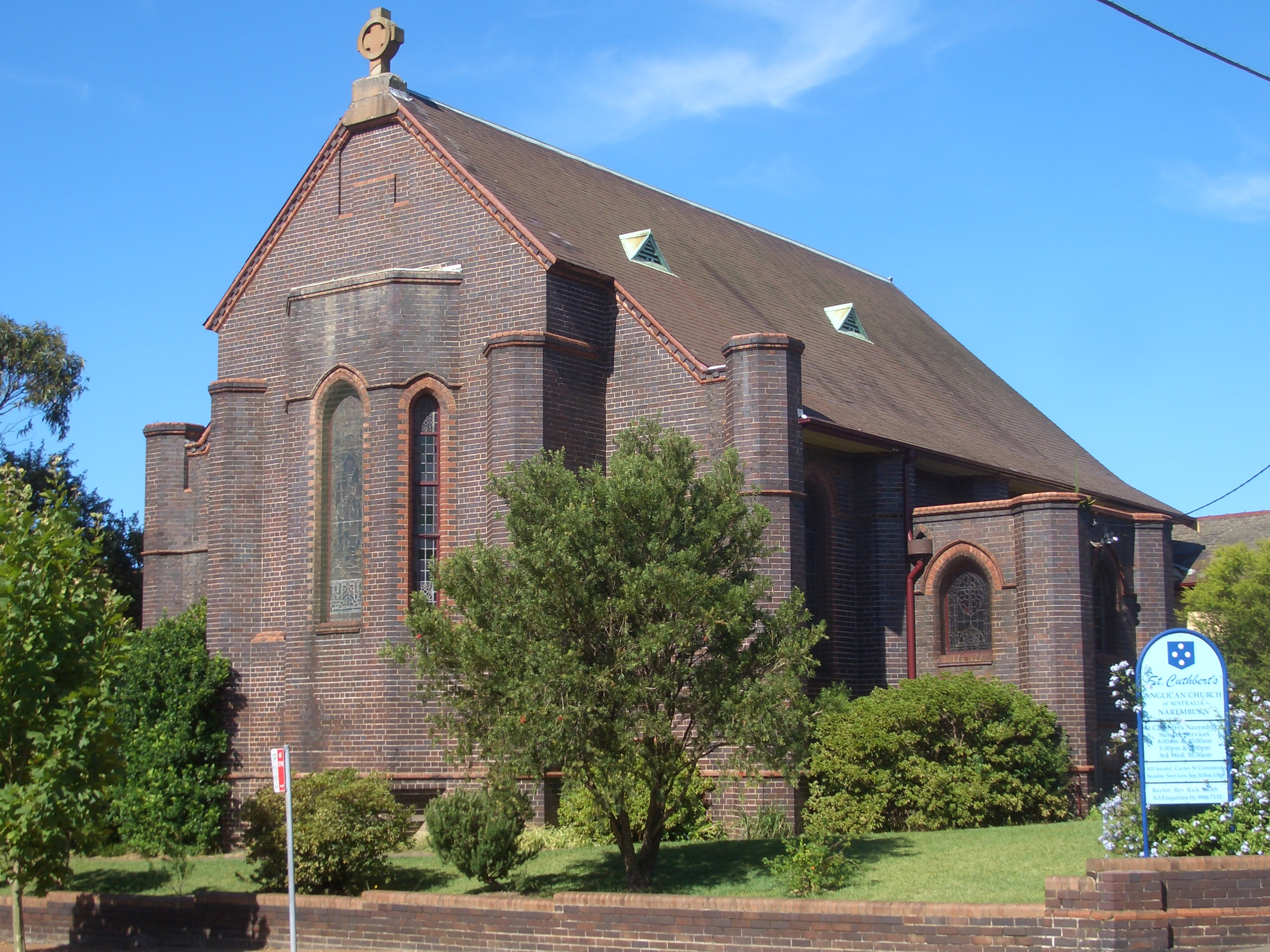
- St. Cuthbert's Anglican Church, Naremburn
- Naremburn Cammeray Anglican Church
- 33.8188°S 151.201°E
- Country: Australia
- Denomination: Anglican
- Website: www.ncachurch.com

History
- Former name(s): • Parish of St. Cuthbert's Anglican Church, Naremburn; • Parish of All Saints', Cammeray

Administration
- Diocese: Sydney

Naremburn Cammeray Anglican Church is a parish of the Sydney diocese of the Anglican Church in Australia. The parish is located on the lower North Shore of Sydney and has two ministry centres in Cammeray and Naremburn.

The Church's vision is "To see a North Shore that knows Jesus". Its mission is "To make disciples who prepare for Jesus’ return all to God's glory".

== History ==
In post-World War I Sydney, there was an upsurge in church construction, among which were Naremburn and Cammeray. These two existed as separate parishes in their early decades. Throughout the 1950s, '60s and '70s the Parish of St Cuthbert's Naremburn and the Parish of All Saints' Cammeray were busy. In those days, the Sunday Schools had 350 children attending each Sunday and St Cuthbert's won 3 cricket premierships in the local competition.

In the late 1970s a decision was made to join the two parishes. At that time, there were four churches, three halls, and two rectories. By 1997, two of the churches had been disposed of, the three halls had been demolished, the two rectories had been sold, and a new one had been built on site.

A church plant from St Thomas North Sydney led by Rick Smith resulted in the attendance and congregation size reversing quite radically, and by 2013 NCA had nine congregations and a normal Sunday attendance of over 600.

In 2008, the Naremburn building was deemed too small and run down to cater for the ongoing expansion of ministry and building work began on a new Naremburn Ministry Centre. This work was completed in late 2009, and the facilities are extensively used every day. During 2010, Willoughby Council awarded the parish a commendation in the council's heritage awards through the parish's commitment to protect the heritage values of the original church by recognising the nature of new uses.

After the success of the redevelopment of the Naremburn building, in 2016 the parish commenced the redevelopment of its Cammeray building. The new building was completed in June 2017.

== Present ==
There are currently 4 services each Sunday:

- 9am Cammeray
- 10am Naremburn
- 3pm SJEC @ Cammeray
- 6pm Naremburn

== Sydney Japanese Evangelical Church ==
The Sydney Japanese Evangelical Church (SJEC) meet at Cammeray from 3pm each Sunday. In April 2009, Grahame and Cathy Smith were inducted as the new ministers of this congregation. They spent the previous 18 years in Japan serving as missionaries with CMS. An article appeared in the May 2009 issue of Southern Cross, the magazine of the Anglican Diocese of Sydney, profiling the SJEC ministry.

The SJEC Church service is in Japanese and visitors are welcome.

== See also ==
- Australian non-residential architectural styles
- List of Anglican churches in the Diocese of Sydney
