= All Saints Anglican Church, Petersham =

All Saints Anglican Church
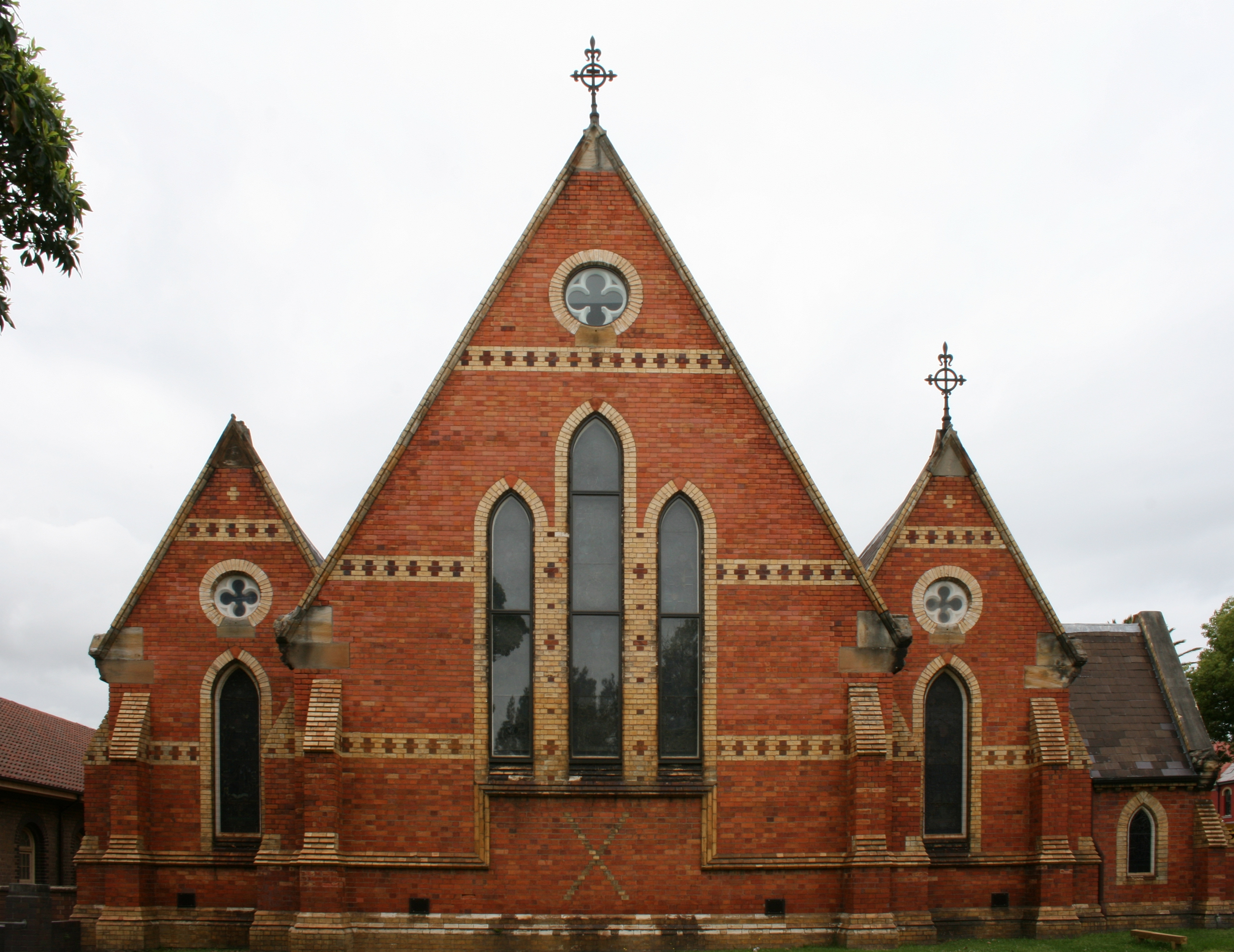
- End view of the church

- Location of All Saints Anglican Church, in greater Sydney
- 33°48′34″S 151°00′33″E
- Location: 325 Stanmore Road, Petersham, New South Wales
- Country: Australia
- Denomination: Anglican

History
- Status: Church

Architecture
- Functional status: Complete
- Architect: Benjamin Backhouse
- Architectural type: Gothic Revival
- Years built: 1870–1886

Administration
- Diocese: Sydney

Clergy
- Rector: Rev. Benjamin Gray

New South Wales Heritage Database (Local Government Register)
- Official name: All Saints Anglican Church, including interiors
- Type: Local government heritage (built)
- Designated: 12 December 2011
- Reference no.: I224
- Type: Church
- Category: Religion
- Builders: Thomas Lane

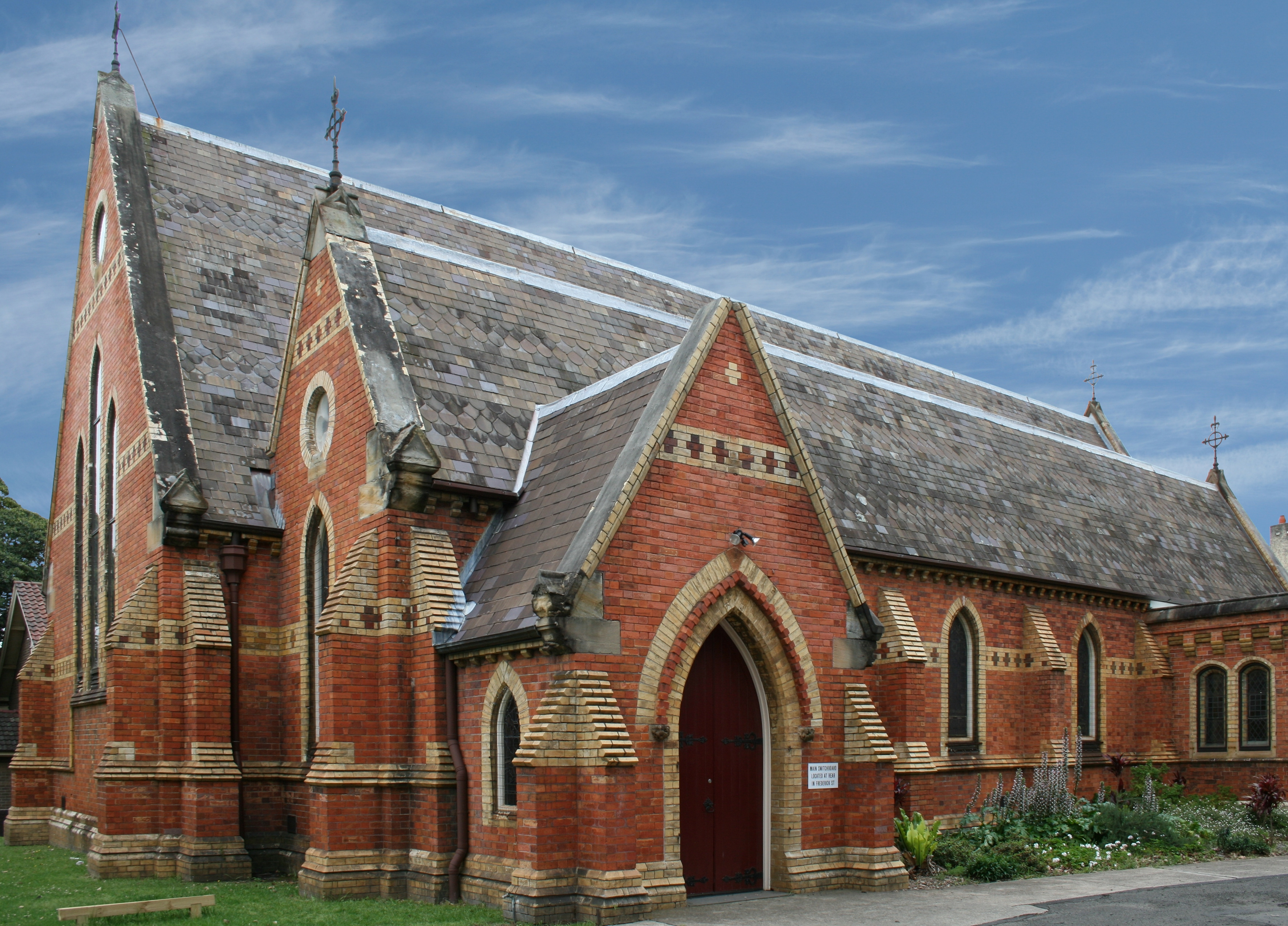
Corner view of the church.

All Saints Anglican Church is an Anglican church in the Diocese of Sydney. The church is located at 325 Stanmore Road, Petersham, New South Wales, Australia.

== History ==
The first church service was held in Petersham on 15 April 1860 in a tiny school room. Shortly thereafter, the congregation resolved to build a school and hall. The old school room no longer exists.

== Church building ==
In 1870 the parish decided to build a proper church. The site for the church was bequeathed to the Church by the late Mrs. Priddle, sister of Dr. Wardell, an early settler in Petersham. Building commenced and the foundation stone of the present building was laid on 17 December 1870. It was designed by Benjamin Backhouse and built by Thomas Lane.

Nearly a year elapsed before the eastern end of the building was finished. The opening service was held on All Saints' Day, 1 November 1871. The cost of the church was £1,927.

The western end of the building was commenced in 1879 and completed in 1880. A choral re-opening service was held on 11 September 1880.

The church vestry was built in 1886. In the same year, a pipe organ built by A. Hunter & Son of Clapham, England was installed at a cost of £750. The organ was converted from a water motor to an electric motor in 1911.

On 11 February 1974, the National Trust of Australia (NSW) included the church building in the Trust's register of Historic Buildings. It is also listed on the local government heritage register.

A memorial stone was laid by the Governor of New South Wales, Sir Roden Cutler on 1 November 1970 to commemorate 100 years of service to Petersham.

== Prominent members of Ministry ==
- Rev Henry Andrew Palmer, foundation rector
- Rev Charles Baber
- Can Robert Edward Goddard
- Rev Percival James Bazeley
- Rev Charles Edward Adams
- Rev Ronald Arthur Johnson
- Rev Thomas Eric Champion

The current senior minister is Rev Benjamin Gray.

== Notable parishioners ==
- Charles Arthur Jarman, notable organist and composer.

== See also ==
- Australian non-residential architectural styles
- List of Anglican churches in the Diocese of Sydney
