= All Souls Anglican Church, Leichhardt =

All Souls' Anglican Church, Leichhardt
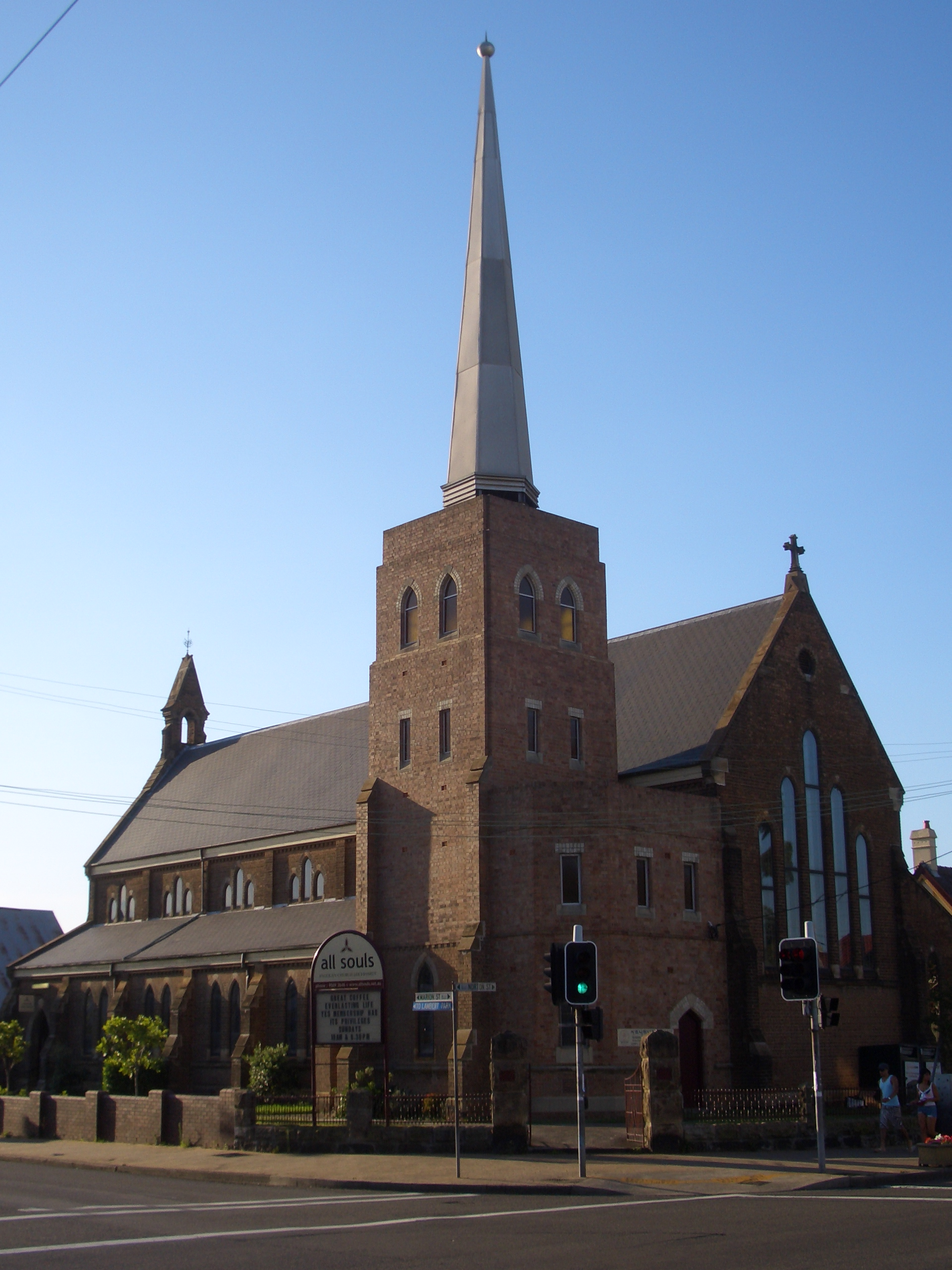
- All Souls Anglican Church, Leichhardt
- All Souls' Anglican Church, Leichhardt
- 33°53′01″S 151°09′24″E
- Location: Norton and Marion Streets, Leichhardt, New South Wales
- Country: Australia
- Denomination: Anglican
- Website: www.allsouls.net.au

All Souls is an Anglican church in the Diocese of Sydney. The church is located in the corner of Norton and Marion Streets, Leichhardt, New South Wales, Australia.

== First building ==
The first All Souls' Parish Church was opened for public worship on Saturday, 7 January 1882. The building and the land together cost £800.

== Current church building ==
Soon after the first building was opened, the first Rector of the parish Thomas Holme encouraged the parish to build a new and bigger church to house the congregation. The new church was designed by Blacket Bros. This is the architectural firm founded by Edmund Blacket who was a prominent Anglican Church architect of the eighteenth century. The church is designed in the early English Gothic style. It has a simple brick façade with a tile roof and is finished with sandstone details. There is also a box shaped tower with a slender style spire which was built at a later time. The building is heritage listed as be notable for its landmark tower. The church's website describes the building is being "distinctively evangelical with its short sanctuary and lack of cruciform design". The first service in the new building was conducted on 2 February 1884.

== In the news ==
The church came to notice in the media with its introduction of a "café" style church service in 2004. This was to accommodate the changing nature of the Leichhardt area since the post-war immigration of Europeans to Australia. Since World War II, the area has become known as the "Little Italy" of Sydney. The café service was there a natural extension of the café streetscape of the Norton Street.

Later during the soccer world cup, the church posted a sign outside its building that read "Jesus saves better than Kalak". Later, another sign read "We're putting the mental back into fundamentalism." and then later "We're putting the fun back into fundamentalism".

== Prominent members of Ministry ==
The Rev Dr Leon Morris, later New Testament scholar and Principal of Ridley Melbourne, taught Sunday School at the branch church of St Mark's Lilyfield as a young man in the 1930s.

The Rev. Dr. Tim Foster was appointed in May 2002 and left in May 2009 to the role of Director of Ridley Melbourne. His replacement, announced on 7 June 2009, was Rev. Darren Hindle, a graduate of Sydney Mission and Bible College who has previously served at St. Andrew's Anglican Church, Kowloon, Hong Kong and St John's, Shaughnessy, Vancouver, British Columbia, and as Anglican Chaplain to the Royal Australian Navy.

== Notable parishioners ==
- Thomas Chaplin Breillat, merchant and founder of the Sydney Chamber of Commerce.

== See also ==
- Australian non-residential architectural styles
- List of Anglican churches in the Diocese of Sydney
