= St Philip's Anglican Church, Kingswood =

St. Phillip's Anglican Church
- Location in greater metropolitan Sydney
- 33°45′47″S 150°43′12″E
- Location: Bringelly Road and Second Avenue in Kingswood, Sydney, New South Wales
- Country: Australia
- Denomination: Anglican
- Website: kingswoodanglican.org

History
- Status: Church
- Dedication: Saint Philip
- Consecrated: 1959

Architecture
- Functional status: Active
- Architectural type: Church
- Style: Victorian Gothic Revival
- Completed: 1898

Administration
- Diocese: Sydney
- Parish: Kingswood

New South Wales Heritage Database (Local Government Register)
- Official name: St Phillip's Anglican Church
- Type: Local Government heritage
- Criteria: a., c., & f.
- Designated: 20 December 1991
- Reference no.: Local government register
- Type: Church
- Category: Religion
- Builders: Jack Melville; James Wainwright (ironwork)

St. Phillip's Anglican Church Kingswood is an Anglican church at the corner of Bringelly Road and Second Avenue in Kingswood, a western suburb of Sydney, New South Wales, Australia. It was completed in 1896 and is a modest late-Victorian Gothic Revival building constructed in brick comprising a nave, chancel, and porch. The church was listed on the City of Penrith local government heritage register on 20 December 1991.

== History ==
In 1897 four blocks of Crown land were given to the residents of Kingswood for a church meeting place and cemetery (later not needed due to the dedication of Penrith Cemetery). The contractor was Jack Melville with ironwork given by local blacksmith James Wainwright. The porch on the western side was added later. Opened in 1898, the church was not consecrated until 1959. A Sunday school hall was completed in 1958 but was demolished.

== Ministries and services ==
On Sundays, there is a 9:30 am family service. There is also a 5:00 pm traditional prayer book service. The 1978 AAPB liturgy is used in this service. In the 7:00 pm cafe church, people sit at tables instead of rows and drink coffee and cold drinks, eat food, discuss faith and sing a few songs, hear a talk and say some prayers.

The church run a wide range of groups, running from a boys group on Wednesday nights and kids club on Friday afternoons to a Youth Group on Friday nights 7:30–9:30 for kids in years 6–10.

The church runs scripture in local primary school and do work with the Western Sydney University.

== See also ==
- List of Anglican churches in the Diocese of Sydney
