= Toongabbie Anglican Church =

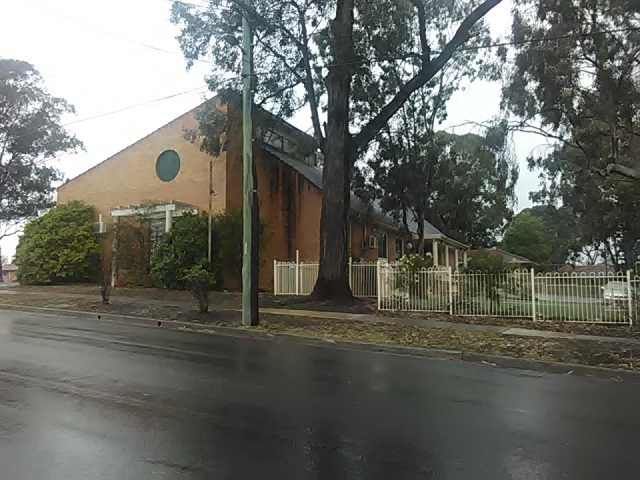
- Toongabbie Anglican Church in 2019
- Toongabbie Anglican Church
- 33°47′50″S 150°57′47″E
- Location: 46 Binalong Road (cnr Burrabogee Road), Pendle Hill, New South Wales
- Country: Australia
- Denomination: Anglican Church of Australia
- Churchmanship: Evangelical
- Website: tac.church

History
- Status: Church

Architecture
- Functional status: Active

Administration
- Diocese: Sydney
- Parish: Toongabbie

Clergy
- Rector: Michael Hastie

Toongabbie Anglican Church is an evangelical Anglican church in the Sydney Diocese of the Anglican Church of Australia. The church is located in the suburb of Pendle Hill in Sydney's west. Toongabbie Anglican Church is the sole church in the Anglican Parish of Toongabbie.

== History ==
The church of St Marys, Pendle Hill is built on land that was granted to William Wentworth. There has been a church building of St Mary's Toongabbie since 1889. This first church was demolished in 1994.

=== Establishment of St Mary congregation ===
In May 1889 work began on a new chaple on the estate of Mr Wentworth. The press recorded the event:

On Monday afternoon Bishop Barry laid the foundation stone of a new church to be erected at Toongabbie, near Parramatta. A large concourse of people from the district, as well as from Parramatta, were present, and were entertained at luncheon on the ground by the ladies of the parish. The stone was laid with all the ceremony incidental to such occasions... Headed by a donation from the Bishop, contributions to the amount of £54 16s were placed on the stone. The new church, which is to cost about £280, is expected to be completed in about six weeks. It will be of brick, 30ft by 25ft, and will supply a want long felt in the neighborhood.

From the beginnings there were concerns at being able to secure clergy to officiate in what was still a remote area. To this issue the Dean of Sydney had sent Lay readers to resolve the shortage, which seems to have been exacerbated by boundary disputes between parishes.

In July 1889, the parish bell was unveiled by the dean.

From a 1893 List of Local lay readers, Paul B. Elwell of "Toongabbie, Prospect and Seven Hills" was issued a license on 5 September 1892. Elwell (d. 1899 in Woollahra) was a landowner at Wentworthville and a member of Saint Mary's congregation. His daughter was a long time organist.

This early phase of the parish included an active Anglican congregation in the area that was still mostly forested but opening up for agriculture.

In 1891 the synod approved an ordnance "To authorise the sale of certain lands situate within the Parramatta Domain and at Toongabbie (Seven Hills)" These appear to be surplus land from the establishment of the church.

=== Early twentieth century ===
By the outbreak of World War I the church building had become very run down and there were calls for renovations despite the war. The war had a huge impact on the parish. Each week the news papers of the time bled lists of names from the parish.

Construction of a new garment factory, in 1923, by American business man George Bond, on the adjacent side of the railway line caused a rush of residential subdivision around the church during the early 1920s, and by 1930 the area had acquired a distinctly residential character. Electricity connection along Binalong Road arrived in 1920.

In 1939 the church celebrated its fiftieth anniversary. The local paper described the event:

An old lamp which was used for the first services at St. Mary's Church of England, Toongabbie, 50 years ago, was used again at the church's Golden Jubilee at the week-end. It was suspended above the porch entrance. Many who were present at the opening of the church took part in the special services to commemorate the occasion.

Following a lantern lecture by Mr. P. W. Gledlill on "The Planting of Christianity in Australia." supper was served by a log fire in the church grounds. A birthday cake with 50 candles, donated by Mrs. Symonds,(long time church organist) was cut by Mrs. J. R. Parsons. Jubilee gifts included a chancel carpet, brass vases, book-markers, light shades and tablecloths.

=== Provisional parish ===
In 1950 a provisional parish was created wherein the out centers of Toongabbie and Girraween were taken off the recently created parish of Wentworthville and merged with Seven Hills which at this time had become an out center of Prospect.

The parish at this time was becoming urbanised, allowing for a larger congregation.

The Rev. W. W. Hemming (Rector of Wentworthville) in 1950 became the curate. He had experience of several parish plants prior to this and appears to have been heavily involved. The rectory was at 426 Seven Hills Road, Seven Hills. indicating Seven Hills was the center of the new parish.

=== Parish of Toongabbie ===
Toongabbie became a full parish on the 11th October 1971, one of seven parishes in the area that were created that day. Since then the parish has contained up to four church buildings:

- St Mary's Anglican Church, Pendle Hill. A brick chaple built in 1889 and located at the front of the current church site.
- St John's Anglican Church, Girraween (at 15-17 Tingurra Rd, Girraween) was sold in 1994 and operated a community church, until recently.
- St Mark's Anglican Church, Pendle Hill (located at 8 Pendle Way, Pendle Hill) was sold in 1978. A congregation in the Baptist tradition today occupies the site.
- Holy Trinity Anglican Church, Toongabbie West (formerly in Cecilia Street, Toongabbie overlooking Toongabbie Creek) Built in 1954, this wooden structure was only ever a provisional out center lasted to about 1970.

In 1989 construction began on a new church building at Saint Mary's. The foundation stone reads the new church was dedicated to the glory of God by the right reverend P. R. Watson Bishop in Parramatta 22nd April 1990.

In 1994 the original St Mary's church building, was demolished. This was amidst some local objection.

== Activities ==
=== Sunday meetings ===
- Morning Services with kids programs (Sunday 8.45am & 10.45am)
- Traditional Church (Sunday 3pm)
- Sunday Night Church (Sunday 6pm)

=== Community ===
- ToonieKids Church (creche - Year 5) - part of Family Church
- ToonieKids@Play - a weekly play group
- One80 - youth group
- Growth groups (bible studies)
- Toongabbie Boomers

== List of rectors ==
The following individuals have served as rector, or other titles, of the parish:

Ordinal	Officeholder name	Title	Term start	Term end	Time in office	Notes
1	Arthur Patrick Wade	Rector Wentworthville	1934	1935	0–1 years	
2	Robert William West Hemming	Rector Wentworthville	1950	1950	0 years	
3	Raymond Joseph Bomford	Curate	1953	1955	1–2 years	
4	Thomas Croft	Curate	1955	1958	2–3 years	
5	Brian Black	Curate	1957	1959	1–2 years	
6	Keith Noel Grisdate	Curate	1958	1959	0–1 years	
7	Edward George Newing	Curate	1959	1959	0 years	
8	Frederick Donald Buchanan		1960	1964	3–4 years	
9	P. V. Rainsford	Curate (based in Girraween)	c. 1970	c. 1970	0 years	
10	K. T. Percival	Curate Girraween (provisional parish)	c. 1970	c. 1970	0 years	
11	D. I. Meadows	Curate	1970	1975	4–5 years	
12	D. S. Parker		c. 1980	c. 1984	3–4 years	
13	Martin Robinson					
14	John Reid		1990	1996	5–6 years	
15	Philip Bassett		1996	2007	10–11 years	
16	Raj Gupta		2007	2021	13–14 years	
18	Mike Hastie		2022	incumbent	3–4 years	

== See also ==
- Australian non-residential architectural styles
- List of Anglican churches in the Diocese of Sydney
