= Leichhardt, New South Wales =

Leichhardt
- Suburb
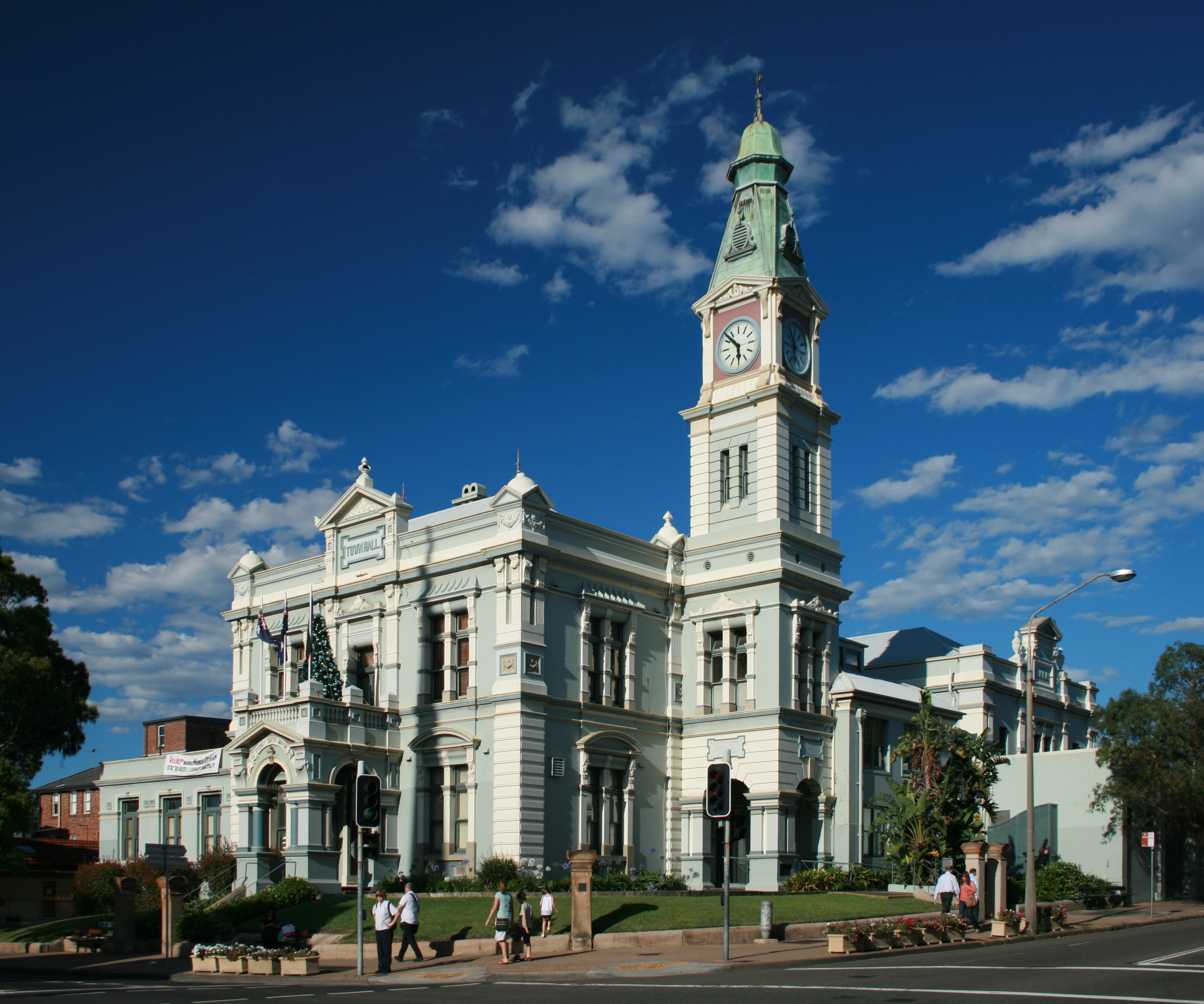
- Leichhardt Town Hall

- Interactive map of Leichhardt
- Country: Australia
- State: New South Wales
- City: Sydney
- LGA: Inner West Council
- Location: 5 km (3.1 mi) west of Sydney CBD
- Established: 1846

Government
  - State electorate: Balmain
  - Federal division: Grayndler

Area
  - Total: 2.60 km^{2} (1.00 sq mi)
- Elevation: 40 m (130 ft)

Population
  - Total: 15,158 (2021 census)
  - Density: 5,830/km^{2} (15,100/sq mi)
- Postcode: 2040
Suburbs around Leichhardt
Haberfield	Lilyfield	Rozelle
Haberfield	Leichhardt	Annandale
Lewisham	Petersham	Stanmore

Leichhardt (/laɪkɑːrt/) is a suburb in the Inner West of Sydney, in the state of New South Wales, Australia. Leichhardt is located 5 kilometres west of the Sydney central business district (CBD) and is the administrative centre for the local government area (LGA) of the Inner West Council. The suburb is bordered by Haberfield to the west, Annandale to the east, Lilyfield to the north and Petersham, Lewisham and Stanmore to the south.

== History ==
=== Aboriginal anthropology ===
Leichhardt was once an area broadly inhabited by the Wangal band of the Dharug (Eora) language group. The 'Eora people' was the name given to coastal Aboriginal people around Sydney – Eora means from this place – local Aboriginal people used this word to describe to Europeans where they came from, and in time the term became used to define Aboriginal people themselves. Wangal country was known as 'wanne' and it originally extended from the suburbs of Balmain and Birchgrove in the east to Silverwater and Auburn in the west. It is unclear how many people were in the tribe; some research indicates in the broader Sydney region there were between 8000 – 10000 indigenous people, but migration over the seasons and violence between tribes would alter this number at different periods. The northern boundary was the Parramatta River. Neighbouring Darug bands were the Cadigal to the east, the Wallumattagal on the northern shore of the Parramatta River and the Bediagal to the south.

=== European settlement ===
Leichhardt is named after the Prussian explorer Ludwig Leichhardt, who in the 1840s was feted for his 4,800 km (c. 3000 mi) expedition in search of an overland route from southern Queensland to Port Essington, a British settlement on the far northern coast of Australia (some 300 km to the north of the modern city of Darwin). In 1848, he famously vanished without trace on his attempt to cross the continent from the Darling Downs in Queensland to the Swan River Colony on the Western Australia coast.

Leichhardt was proclaimed a municipality in 1871. In 1949, it was merged with the municipalities of Annandale and Balmain. In 1967, the municipal boundary was altered to include Glebe and parts of Camperdown. In 2003, the municipal boundary was again changed, to exclude Glebe and Forest Lodge, which are now part of the City of Sydney.

== Commercial area ==
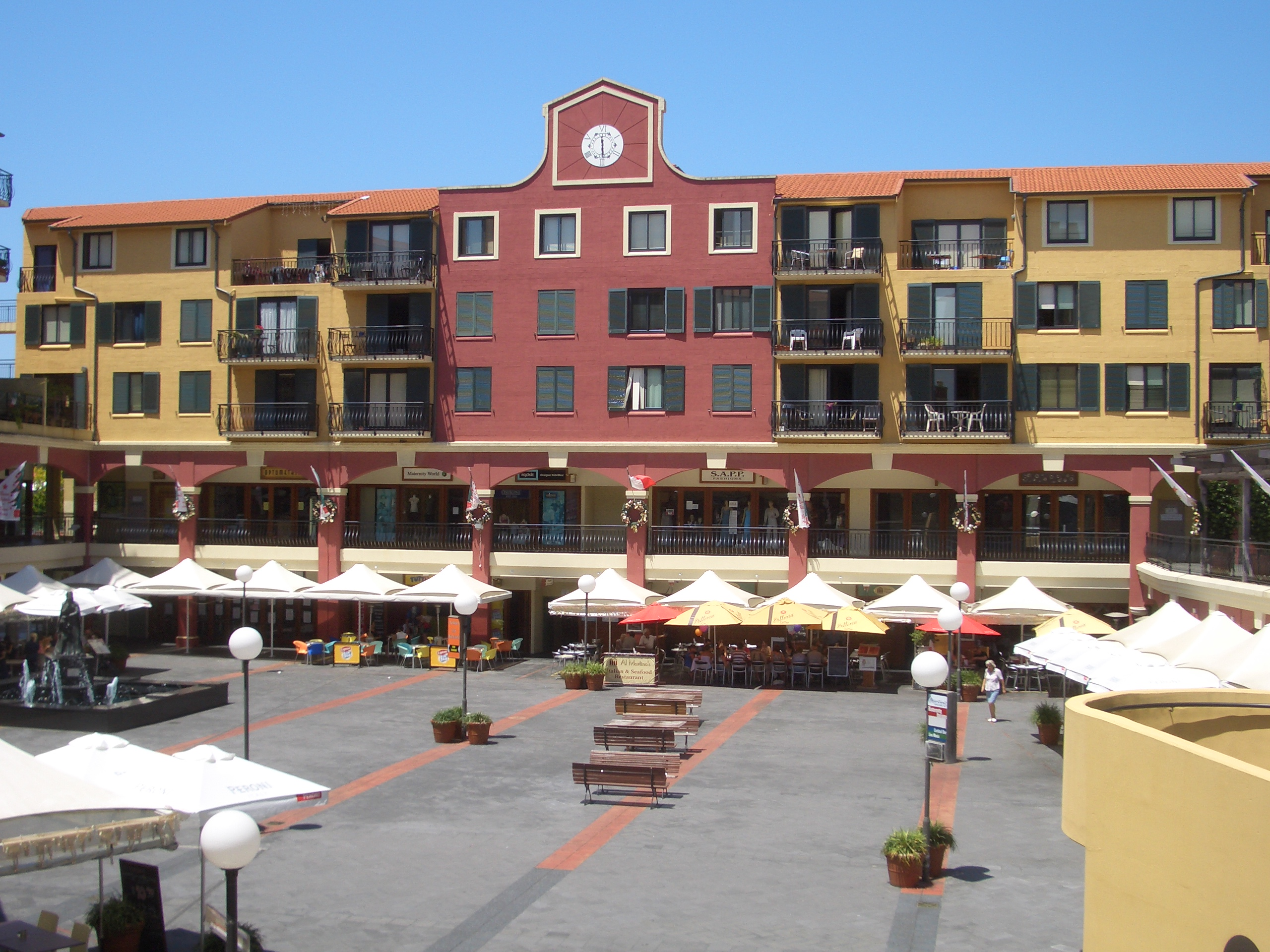
Piazza at the Italian Forum

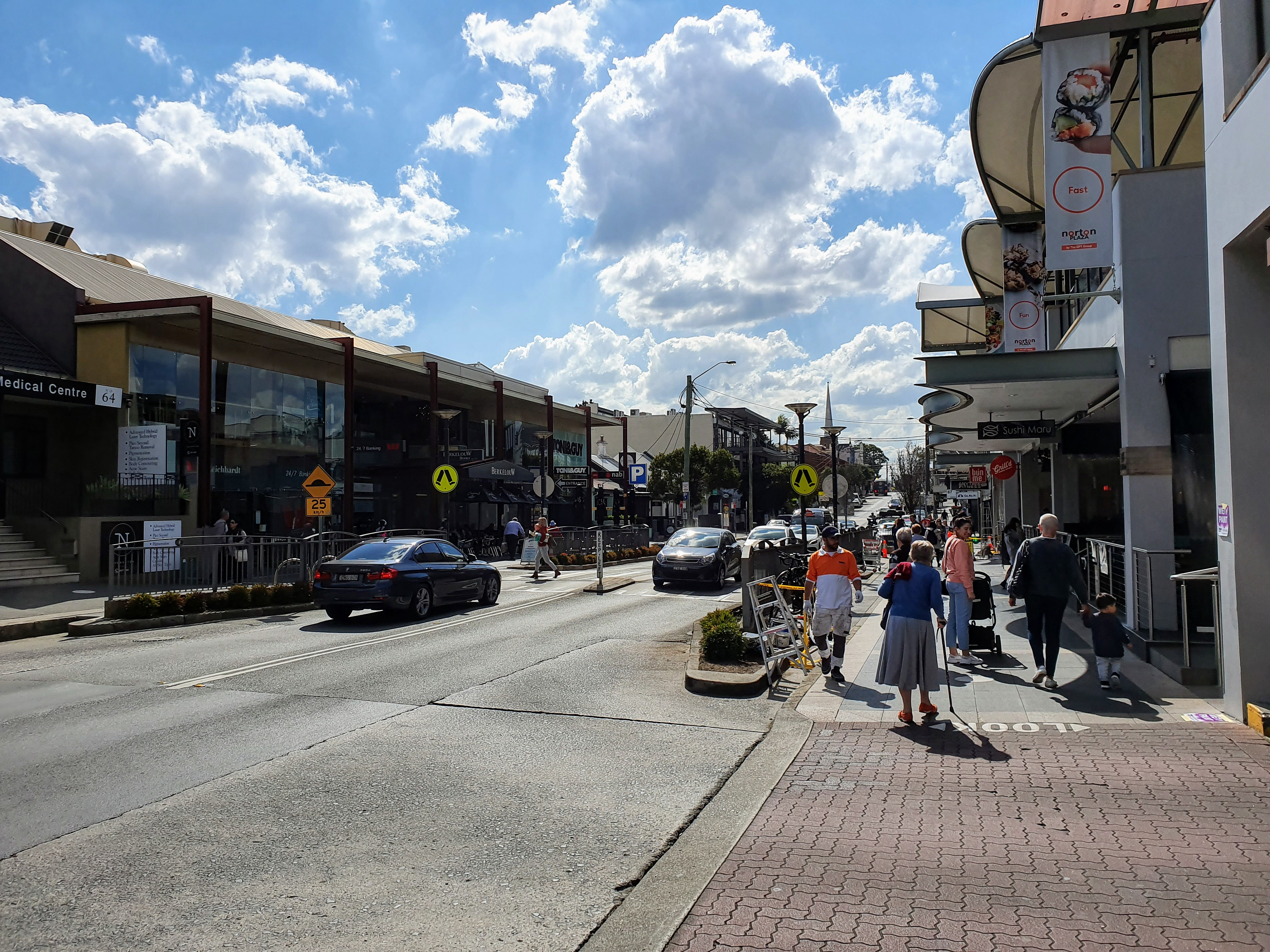
Shops on Norton Street

The main commercial area in Leichhardt is located on Norton Street, north of Parramatta Road (Great Western Highway) and parallel to Balmain Road. The Norton Street commercial area contains a mix of residential buildings, restaurants (Italian and others), cafés, eateries and individual retail outlets, including several bookstores and grocery shops. There are also hotels, a Palace Cinema and two of the suburb's two shopping centres – MarketPlace Leichhardt and Norton Plaza. Commercial developments are also found along the length of Parramatta Road.

The Italian Forum, located just off Norton Street, is notable for its design which seeks to emulate the feel of a Mediterranean town piazza. A pedestrian-only central courtyard featuring outdoors and indoors restaurant dining as well as Leichhardt Library is surrounded by small shops and boutiques on the level above, and all overlooked by residential apartments. Norton Street plays host to various events throughout the year, notably the Italian Fiesta in October, which showcases the Italian culture of the area.

The second shopping centre, MarketPlace Leichhardt (formerly Market Town), is located towards Haberfield on the corner of Marion and Flood Streets. MarketPlace Leichhardt has free car parking and is home to Woolworths, Aldi, Target and over 60 specialty stores.

== Transport ==
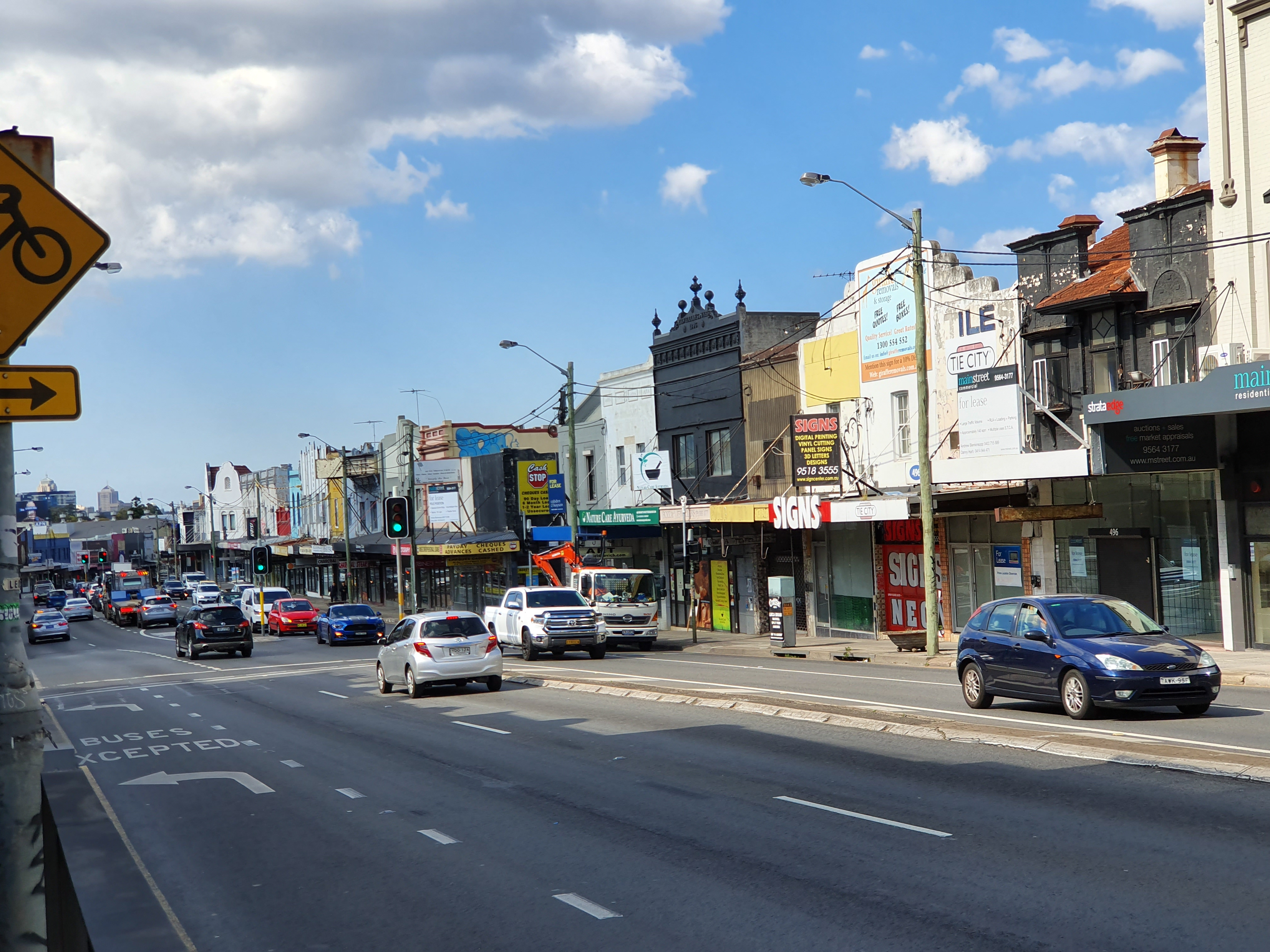
Parramatta Road at Leichhardt

Leichhardt can be accessed by several main roads including Parramatta Road (Great Western Highway), Norton Street, Balmain Road, Marion Street and Catherine Street. The City West Link runs along the northern border of Leichhardt and is a major arterial road, which is part of the A4 and crosses the Anzac Bridge to the CBD. Leichhardt is well serviced by Transit Systems through city and cross regional services. Leichhardt Bus Depot is located on the corner of William and Derbyshire Street.

The following list provides the bus routes in Leichhardt:

- 437 travels from Five Dock to City QVB via Haberfield, City West Link.
- 438X, 438N travel from Martin Place, Railway Square, Parramatta Road, Leichhardt Town Hall, Haberfield, Abbotsford, with 438N being the all stops early morning and late night service, and 438X the limited stop service.
- 440 travels from Bondi Junction to Rozelle via Railway Square, Parramatta Road, Leichhardt Town Hall, Rozelle (Terry Street)
- 445 travels from Balmain (Darling Street), Rozelle, Leichhardt, Petersham, Dulwich Hill, Hurlstone Park, Canterbury station, Campsie station
- 469 travels from Leichhardt to Glebe
- 480, 483, 461X travel from the Domain (461X), Railway Square (480, 483) to Strathfield station via Parramatta Road (Leichhardt) and Ashfield shops

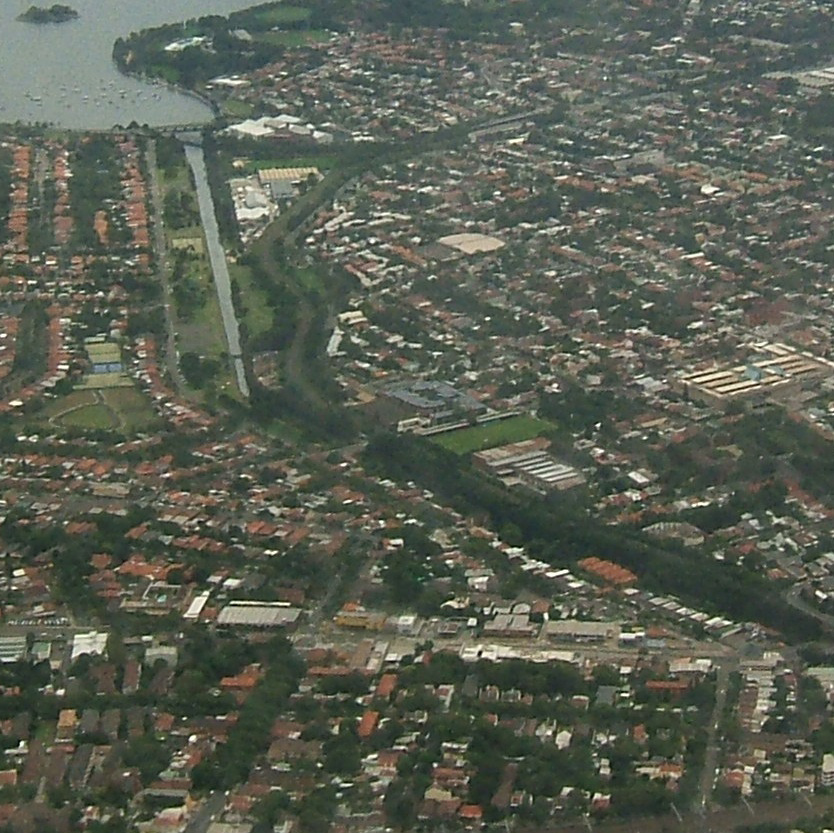
Aerial view of the Metropolitan Goods railway line, which was converted to light rail

- 470 travels from Circular Quay, Forest Lodge, Annandale and Lilyfield.

The southern portion of Leichhardt is serviced by trains at the nearby Petersham railway station, on the Inner West & Leppington Line. The station is an eight-minute walk from Norton Street, along Railway Street.

The western and northern portions of Leichhardt are serviced by the Inner West Light Rail. Leichhardt North lies on the northern border with Lilyfield, adjacent to the City West Link. Hawthorne, serving the north-west of the suburb, and Marion, near Marion Street, are on the western border with Haberfield. Taverners Hill is adjacent to Parramatta Road and lies in the south-west corner of the suburb.

Leichhardt was served by trams from Sydney's former network from 1887 to the 1950s. The Annandale Line ran down Norton Street. The current bus depot at the top of William Street was a 12 road depot, designed to serve a number of planned lines that were never built. Instead, it was used to stored surplus trams in the off peak period, and was rebuilt as the Government Bus Workshops in 1937. A small spur of track remained and was later used by tour trams going through the depot yard nearest Pioneer Park.

== Churches and schools ==
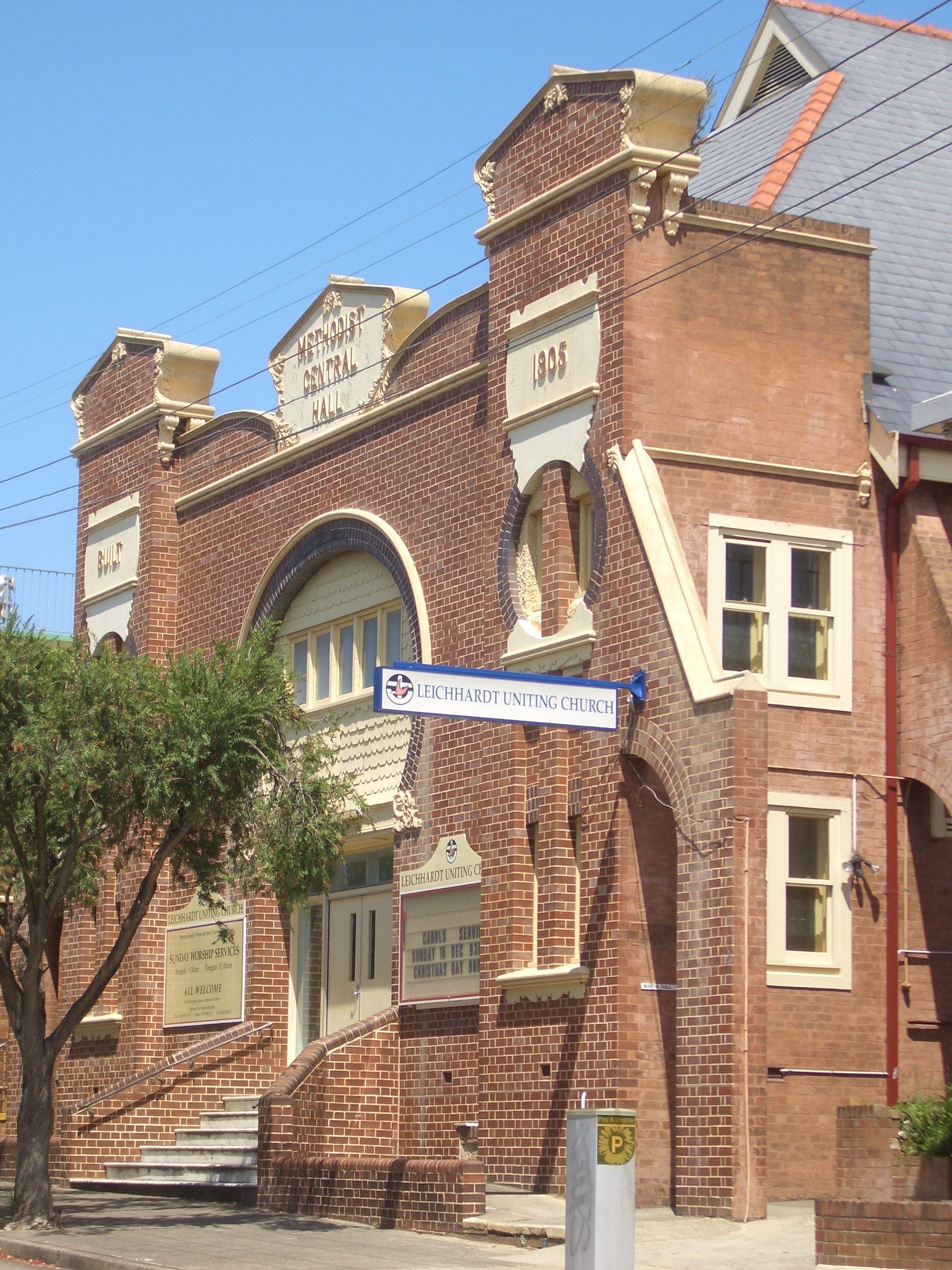
Leichhardt Uniting Church

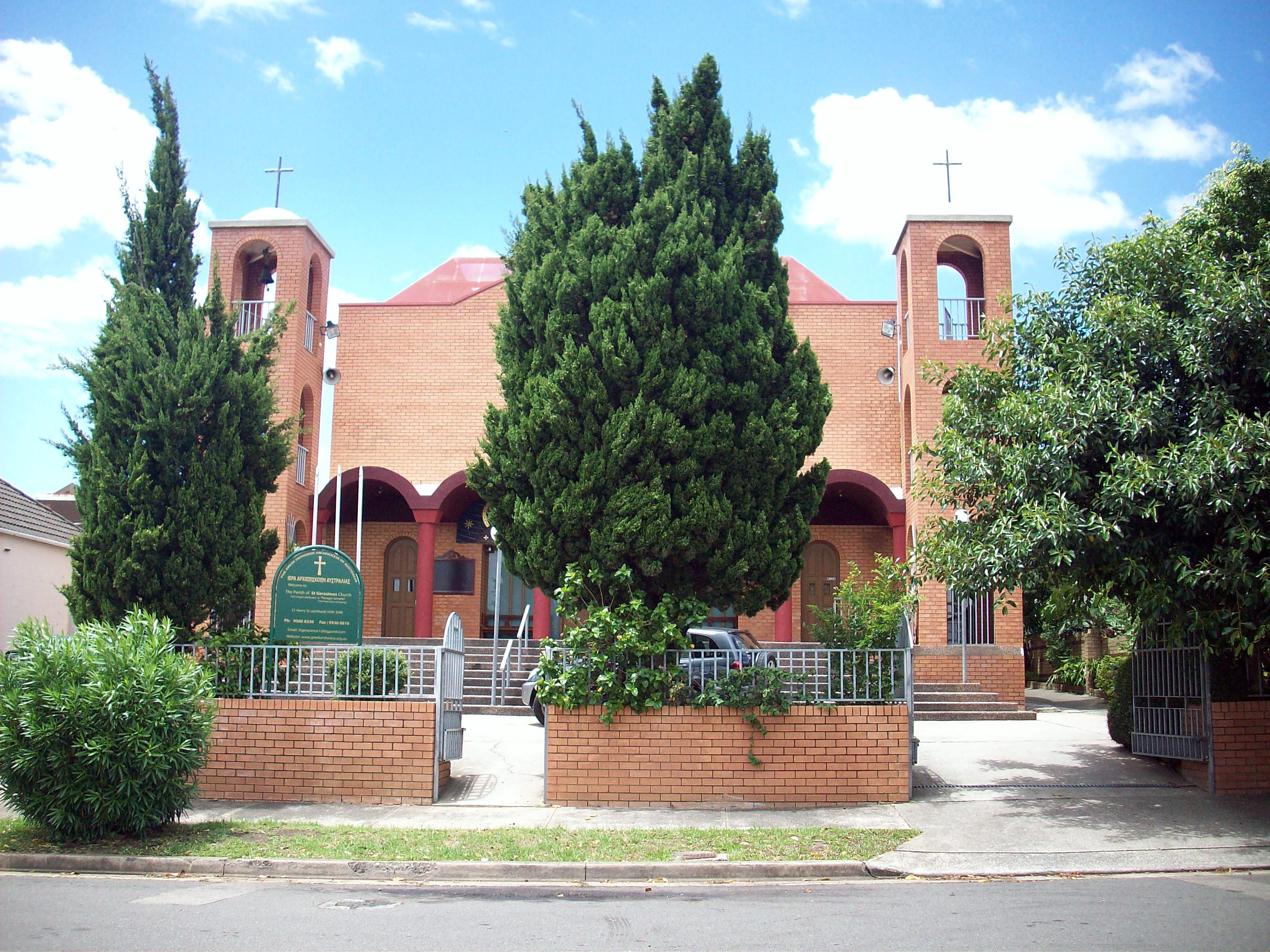
St Gerasimos Greek Orthodox Church

- All Souls Anglican Church on the corner of Norton Street and Marion Street
- Leichhardt Baptist Church on the corner of Foster Street and Lords Road
- Leichhardt Congregational Church in Elswick Street
- Leichhardt Uniting Church in the old Methodist Central Hall on Wetherill Street
- St. Columba and The Holy Souls Parish (Catholic) in Elswick Street
- St. Fiacre's Parish (Catholic) in Catherine Street
- St. Joseph's Catholic Church in Roseby Street
- The Parish of St. Gerasimos Church (Greek Orthodox) in Henry Street

Leichhardt has a number of primary schools and one secondary school.

- Kegworth Public School, a primary, co-educational public school, established in 1887, is located on Tebbutt Street.
- Leichhardt Public School, a primary, co-educational public school, established in 1891, is located on Marion Street.
- St. Columba's Primary School, a Catholic, primary, co-educational public school, established in 1898, is located on Elswick Street.
- St. Fiacre's Primary School, a Catholic, primary, co-educational public school, established in 1894, is located on Catherine Street.
- Sydney Secondary College Leichhardt Campus, a secondary, co-educational public school (partially selective; 7–10), established in 2002, is located on Balmain Road.

== Landmarks ==
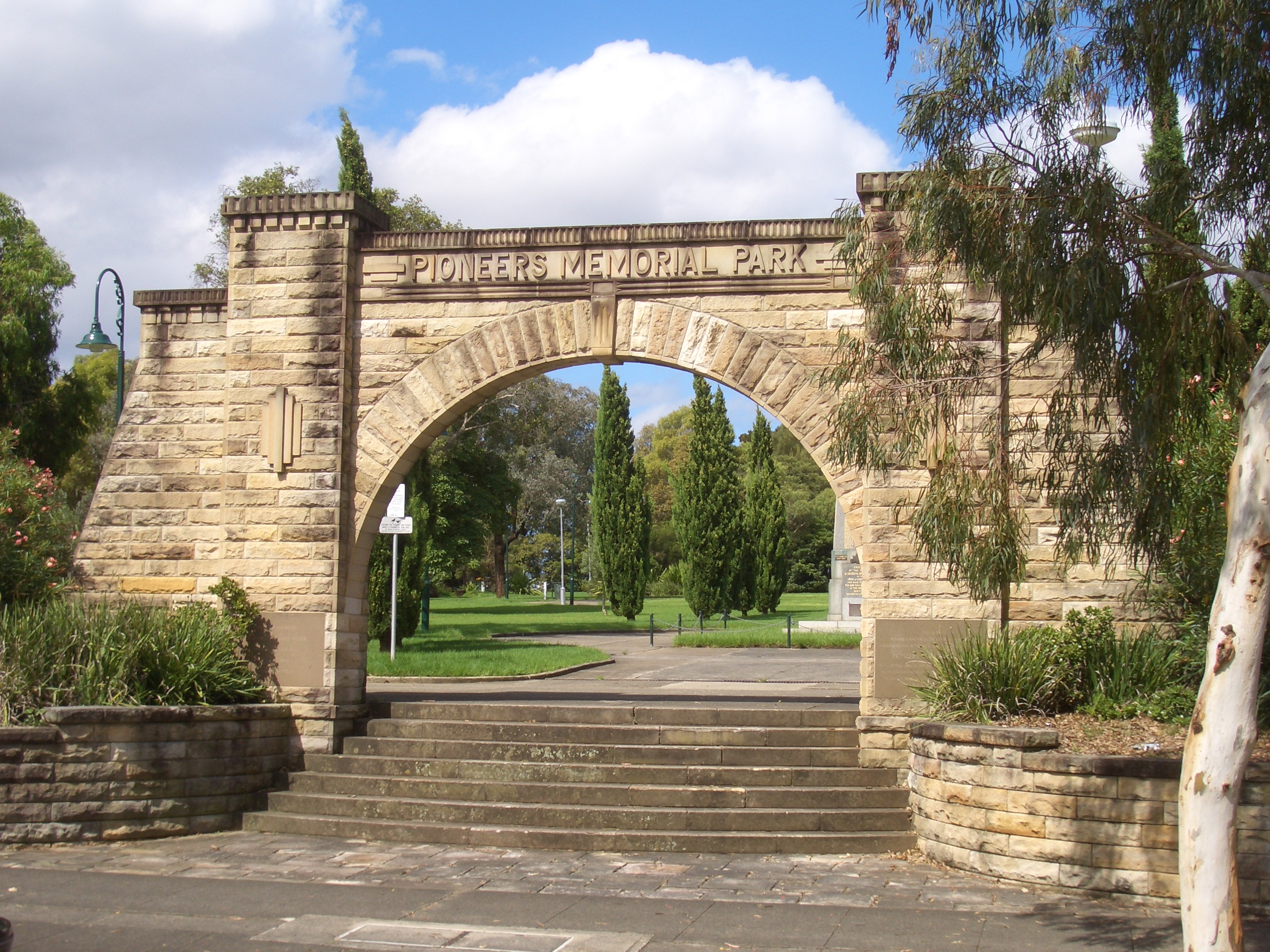
Pioneers Memorial Park entrance

- Leichhardt Fire Station on the corner of Marion Street and Balmain Road
- Leichhardt Hotel (Former) on the corner of Balmain Road and Wetherill Street
- Norton Hotel on the corner of Norton Street and Parramatta Road
- Old Cyclops Toy Factory on William Street
- Palace Cinema on Norton Street

The following buildings are listed on the Register of the National Estate:

- Leichhardt Town Hall, corner Norton and Marion Streets (1888)
- Post Office, corner Norton and Weatherill Streets (1888)
- Public School Buildings, Marion Street (first building 1891, second building 1897)
- Church of England, corner Norton and Marion Streets (1883)

== Parks and recreation ==
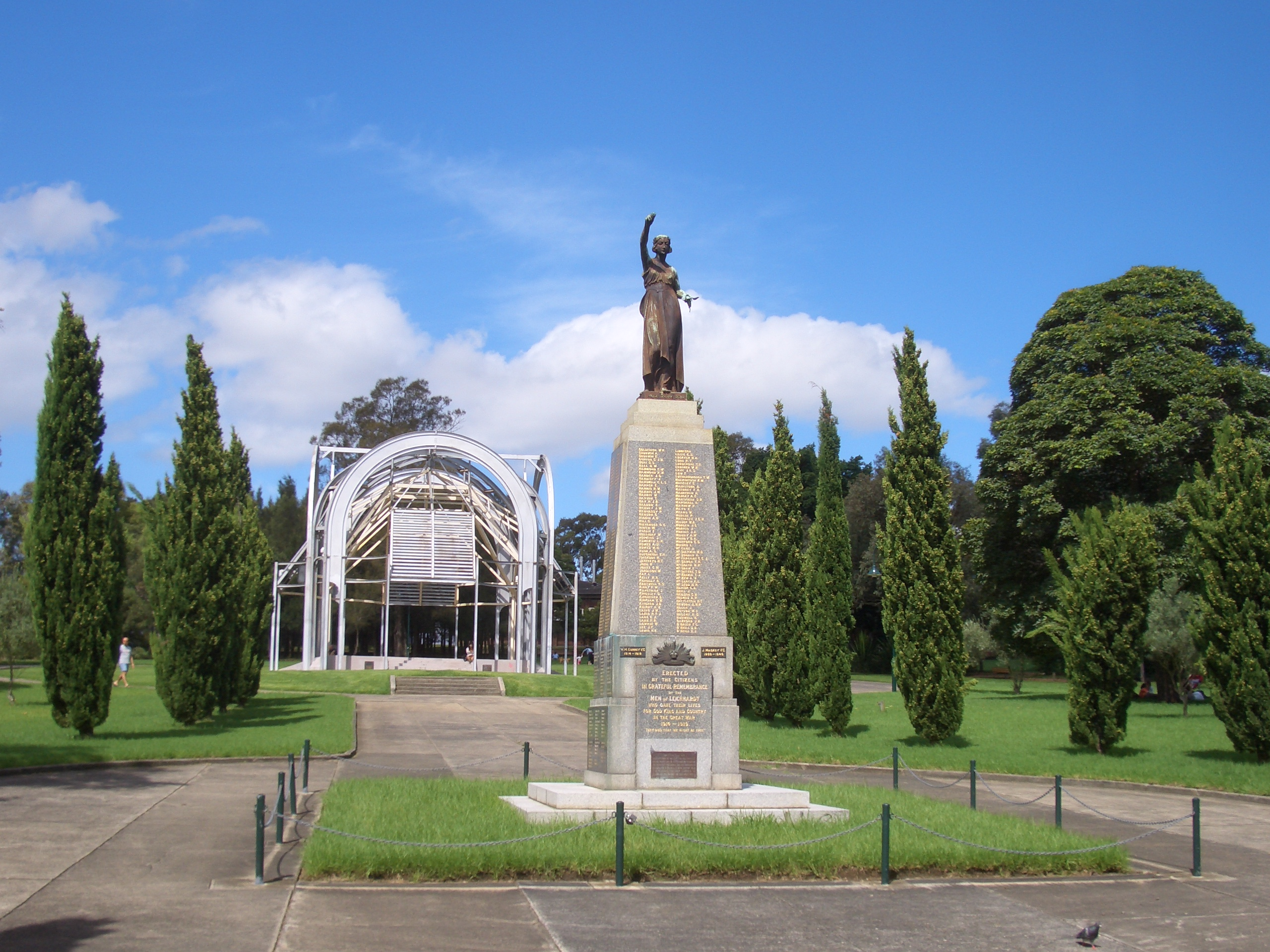
Pioneers Memorial Park

- Pioneers Memorial Park is located in Norton Street and features large grassed areas, native and formal plantings, a war memorial and the Bicentennial Rotunda. It was formally the location for the Balmain Cemetery.
- War Memorial Park is situated on the corner of Moore and Catherine Streets and features large grassed areas as well as shaded areas and a children's playground.
- 36th Battalion Park is situated on the corner of Mackenzie and Hill St and features medium-sized grassed park, electric barbecue, children's play equipment and a half-size basketball court.
- Blackmore Oval is located off Canal Road and is used to play competitive Rugby league and Cricket, amongst others, in the local area. it is the home ground for the Leichhardt Wanderers Junior Rugby League and Cricket club. Facilities include cricket nets, public toilets and the clubhouse.
- Leichhardt Oval: Home to NRL team Wests Tigers and previously for the NSW Premier League team APIA Leichhardt Tigers.
- Lambert Park (Leichhardt) is located on Marion Street and is the home of NSW Premier League team APIA Leichhardt Tigers.

== Culture ==
Leichhardt is home to many creative industry workers and is known for its colourful and inventive mural art, such as the panorama at the Renwick Lane and at the Hawthorne Canal Railway Underpass. Leichhardt has access to many art and cultural organisations. Commercial galleries are found throughout the area and Boomali Gallery, the Aboriginal Arts Organisation is situated in Flood Street in Leichhardt.

The Italian community has commercial, social, and cultural organisations located in Leichhardt, and work is underway everyday to develop the Italian Forum Cultural Centre. Co.As.It. is one of them and they provide a range of culturally and linguistically appropriate services to enhance the quality of life of the community and to promote the Italian language and culture in New South Wales. The suburb was originally considered to be Sydney's 'little Italy', but that reputation has since decreased.

Leichhardt is the yearly host of the Italian Festa on Norton Street where local traffic is temporarily closed on Norton and neighbouring streets transforming surroundings into a huge European style outdoor café, celebrating Leichhardt's cultural diversity with an International Food Fair, gift stalls, community expos and live entertainment throughout the day. Leichhardt is also known for its café culture with cafés in abundance. The oldest café in the area is Café Sport, which is located on Norton Street.

== Population ==
2021 Census: Leichhardt
	Leichhardt	Sydney	Australia
Population	15,158	4,698,656	25,422,788
Median age	37	36	38
Median household income (weekly)	$2,673	$2,122	$1,746
Born in Australia	67.6%	54.2%	66.9%

According to the 2021 census of Population, there were 15,158 people in Leichhardt.

- Aboriginal and Torres Strait Islander people made up 1.3% of the population.
- 67.6% of people were born in Australia. The next most common countries of birth were England 5.0%, Italy 2.4%, New Zealand 2.4%, China 1.4% and Ireland 1.0%.
- 76.3% of people only spoke English at home. Other languages spoken at home included Italian 4.0%, Mandarin 1.8%, Spanish 1.8%, Greek 1.3% and Cantonese 1.1%.
- The most common responses for religion were No Religion 50.5% and Catholic 24.4%.

33.6% of occupied dwellings were terraces, semis or townhouses, 36.5% were separate density housing houses and 29.0% were apartments. The average age of people in the suburb was similar to the rest of Sydney (37) and a lower percentage of people owned their homes outright (23.8%) than those paying them off (34.1%) or renting (40.4%). Median loan repayments ($3,400 per month) were much higher than the national figure ($1,863).

Since the middle of the 20th century, Leichhardt has been a centre for the Italian community, reflected in the many Italian-owned businesses in the area. Although it has become less distinctively Italian with the increasing gentrification of the suburb and movement of families to suburbs with larger blocks of land, its Italian character is still palpable, particularly in the popular restaurants and cafés of its main street, Norton Street. Many residents moved to suburbs further away from Sydney as the city has expanded and larger housing blocks became available.

== Politics ==
- Federal Government: Leichhardt is in the Division of Grayndler in the Australian House of Representatives.
- State Government: Leichhardt is in the Electoral district of Balmain in the New South Wales Legislative Assembly.
- Local Government: Leichhardt is in the Inner West Council local government area.

== Notable residents ==
- Brian Blain (1936–1994), actor
- Vanessa Downing (born 1958), actress
- Thelma Forshaw (1923–1995), writer, journalist – attended St Fiacre's Primary School
- Aaron Woods (born 1991), rugby league player

== Gallery ==
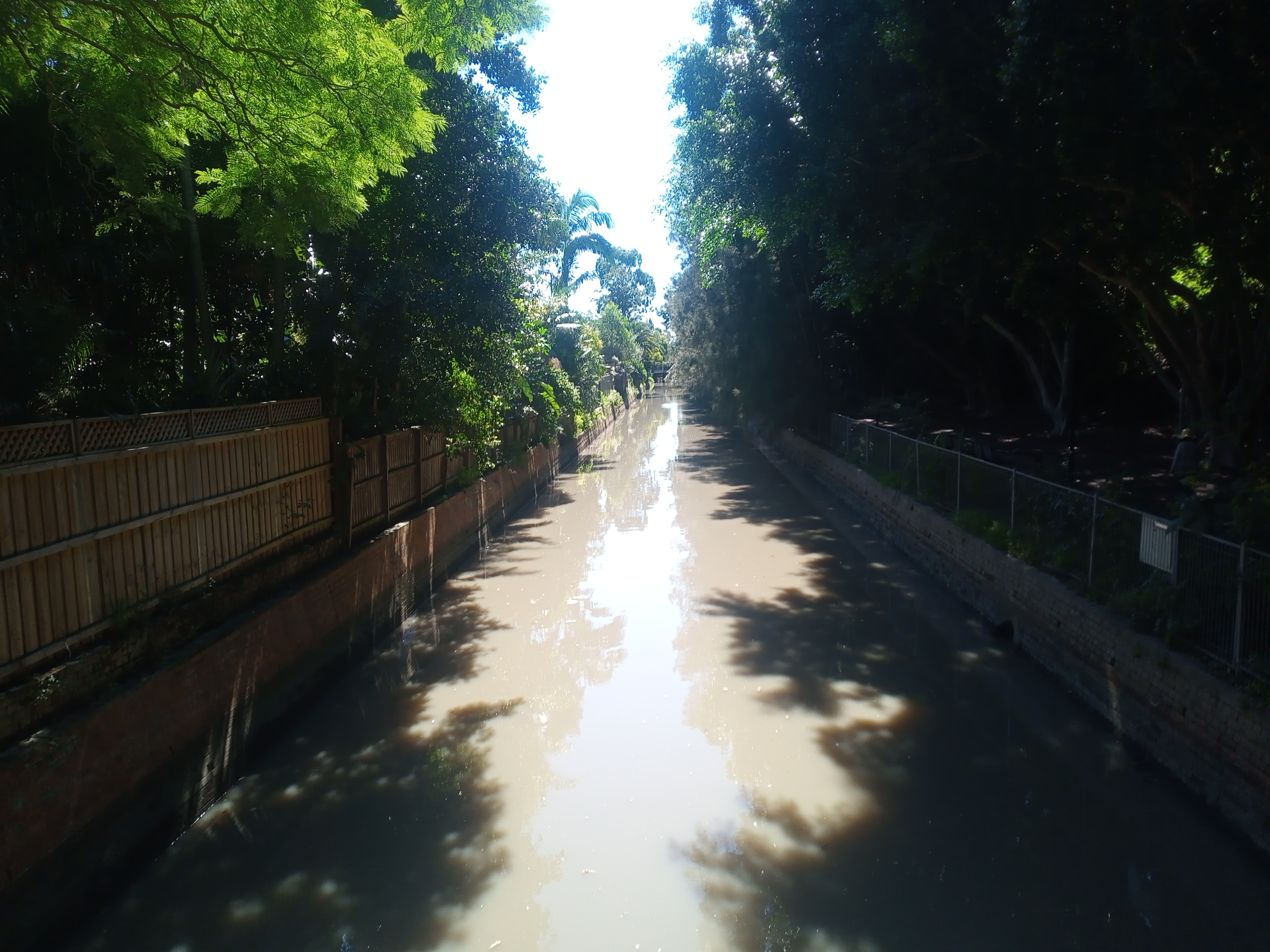
Hawthorne Canal - 2022

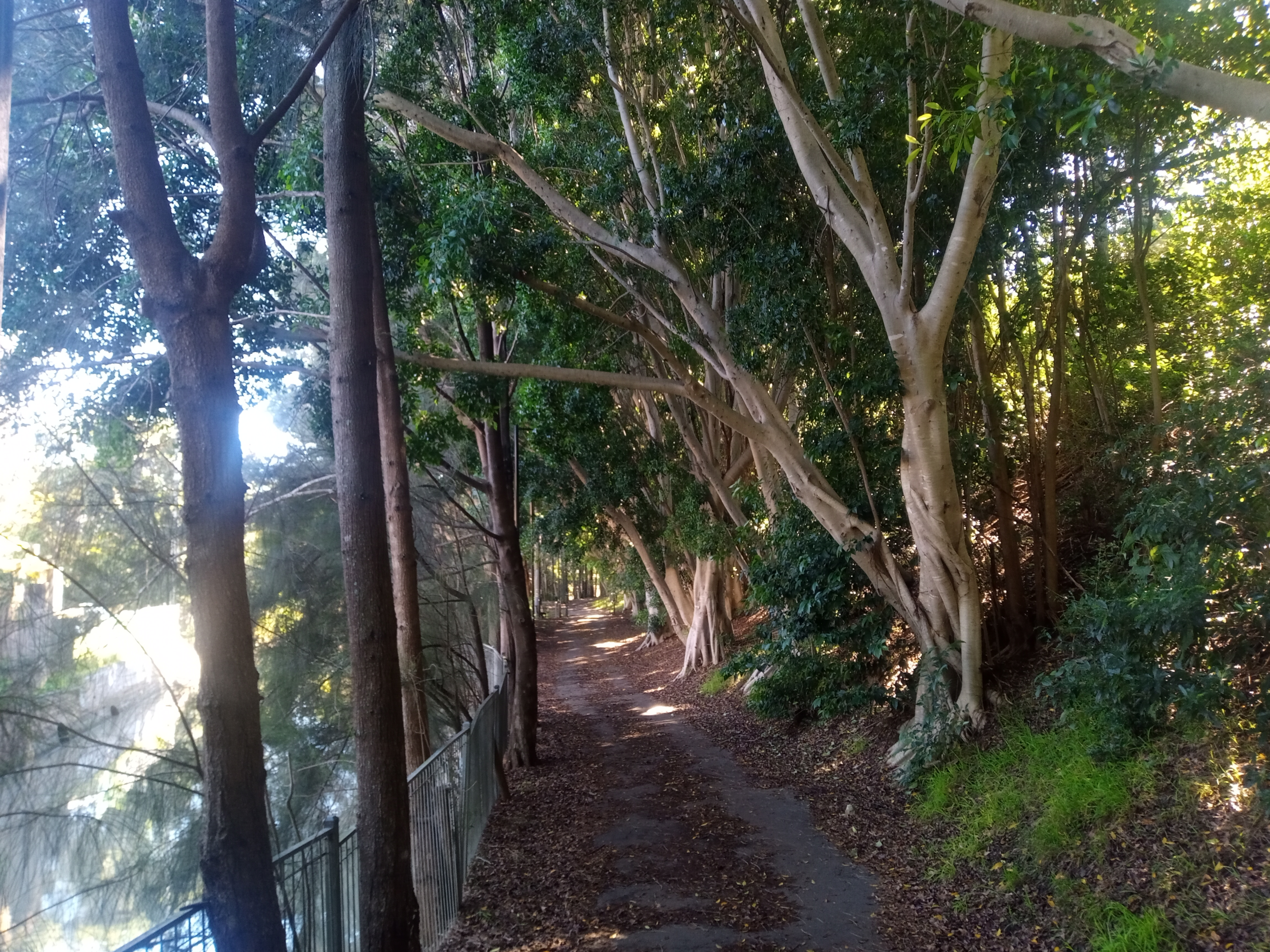
Greenway path - Leichhardt 2022
