= Norton Street =

Street in Leichhardt, New South Wales, Australia

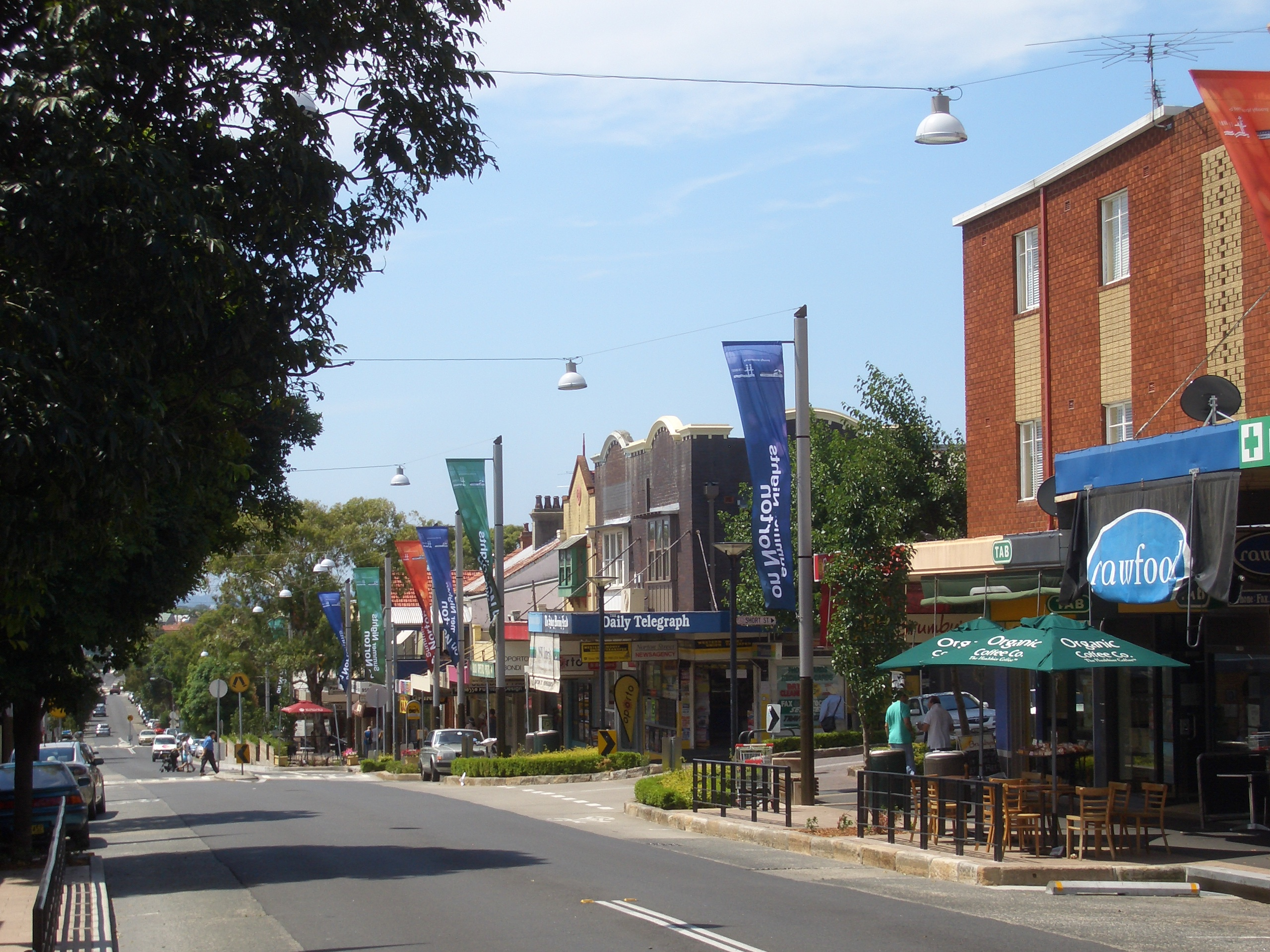
Norton Street

Norton Street is in the suburb of Leichhardt in Sydney, New South Wales, Australia. It is located 5 kilometres west of the Sydney central business district and is the main commercial street in the suburb.

Norton Street contains a mix of residential buildings, restaurants (Italian and others), cafés, eateries and individual retail outlets, including several bookstores and grocery shops. There are also hotels, a Palace Cinema, Norton Street Grocer and two of the suburb's three shopping centres: Norton Plaza and the Italian Forum.

At the southern end of the street is the Italian Forum, notable for its design which seeks to emulate the feel of a Mediterranean town piazza featuring a fountain, ringed by cafés and upmarket fashion shops.

== History ==
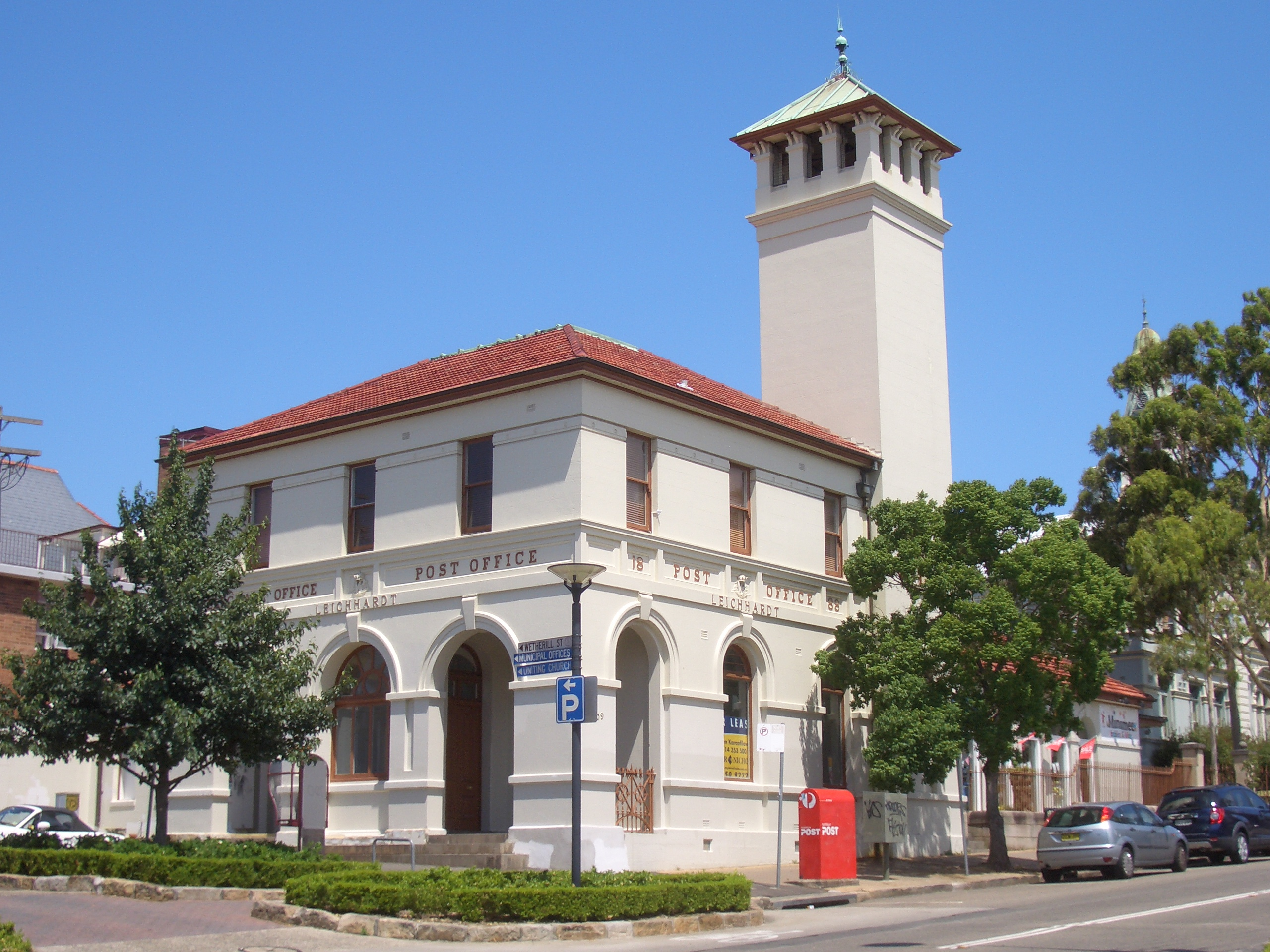
Former Leichhardt Post Office

The street was named in honour of James Norton (1795–1862), a colonial Sydney attorney and solicitor who purchased the grand estate of Elswick in 1834. The 30-hectare Elswick estate was bounded by Parramatta Road, Norton Street, Marion Street, and Elswick Street, Leichhardt; in 1882, it was sub-divided and offered as 600 lots.

Norton Street was once a working-class area populated primarily by first- and second-generation Italian migrants. These days, many of the original inhabitants have moved to outlying suburbs, and the area has gentrified but the Italian flavour remains with Norton Street as its centrepiece. Throughout Sydney, Norton Street is known as "Little Italy" with many Italian eateries.

== Events and celebrations ==
During important events such as the FIFA World Cup, the street is closed and thousands of football fans gather to party. It is also the centre of an annual festival called the Italian Festa, held in October.

== Transport ==
Norton Street is serviced by Transit Systems routes 437, 438X, 440 and 445 and the L1 light rail line at Marion, Hawthorne, Leichhardt North sations and walking about 5 to 10 minutes.

== Gallery ==
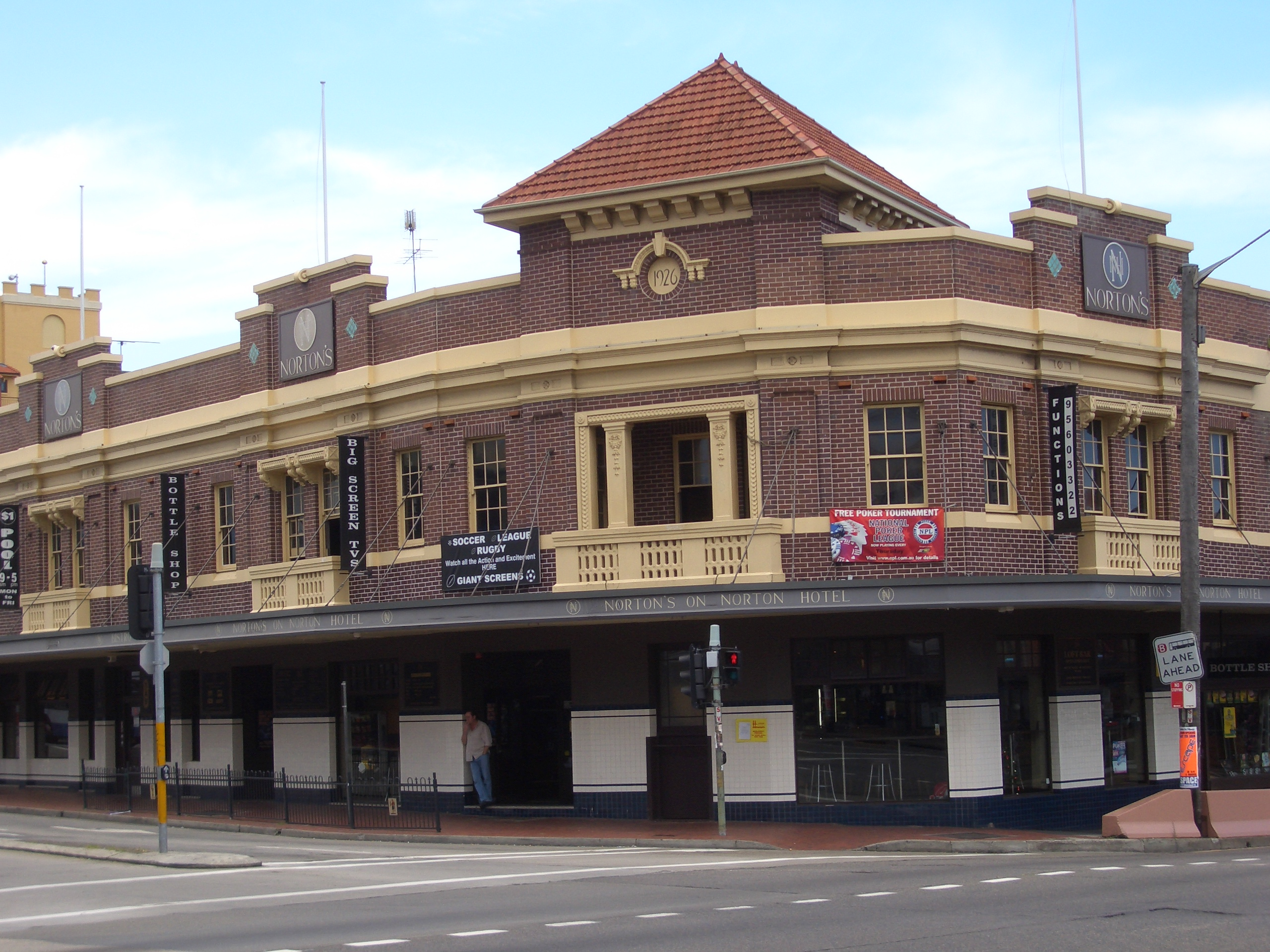
Norton Hotel

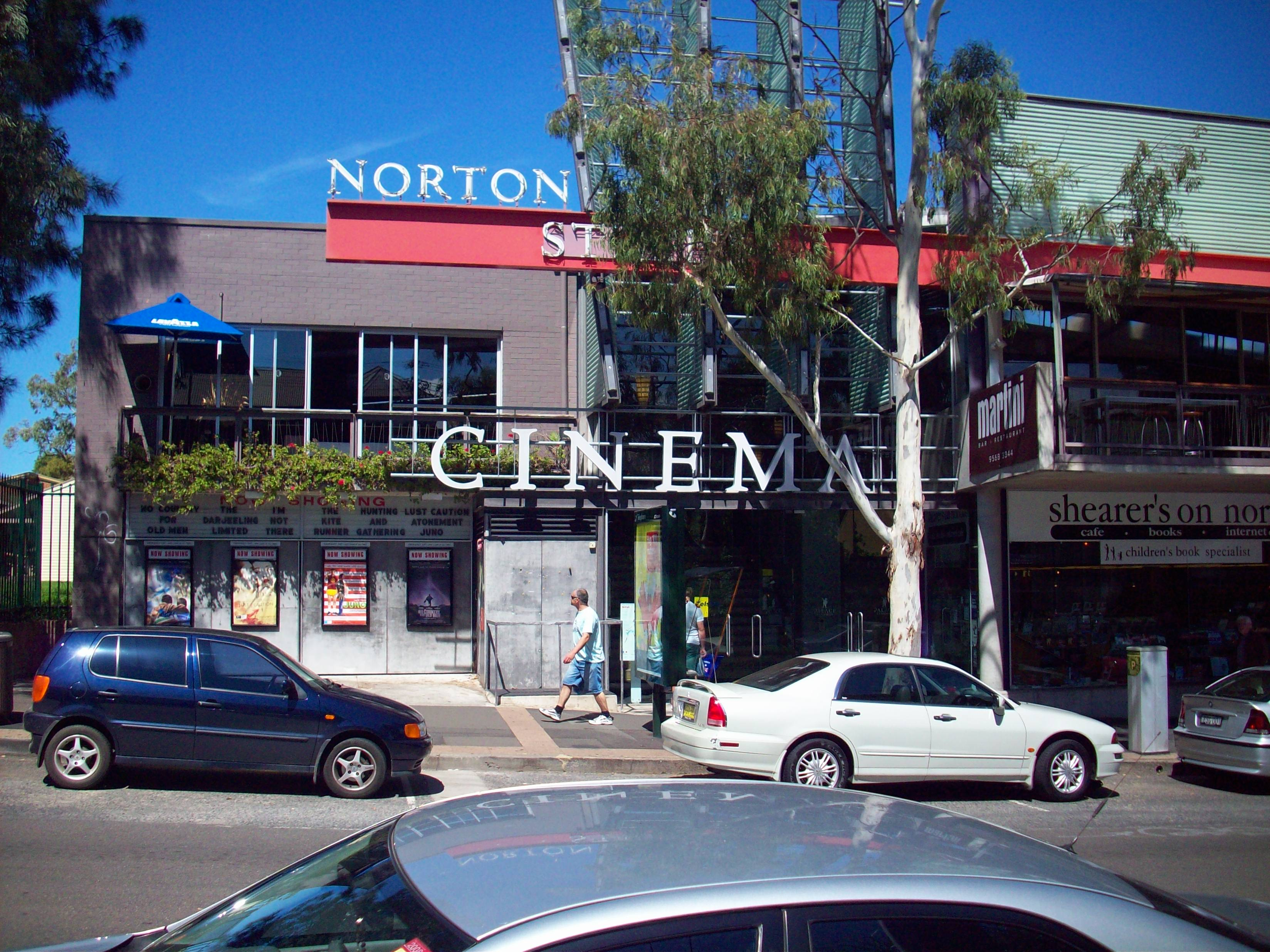
Palace Cinema

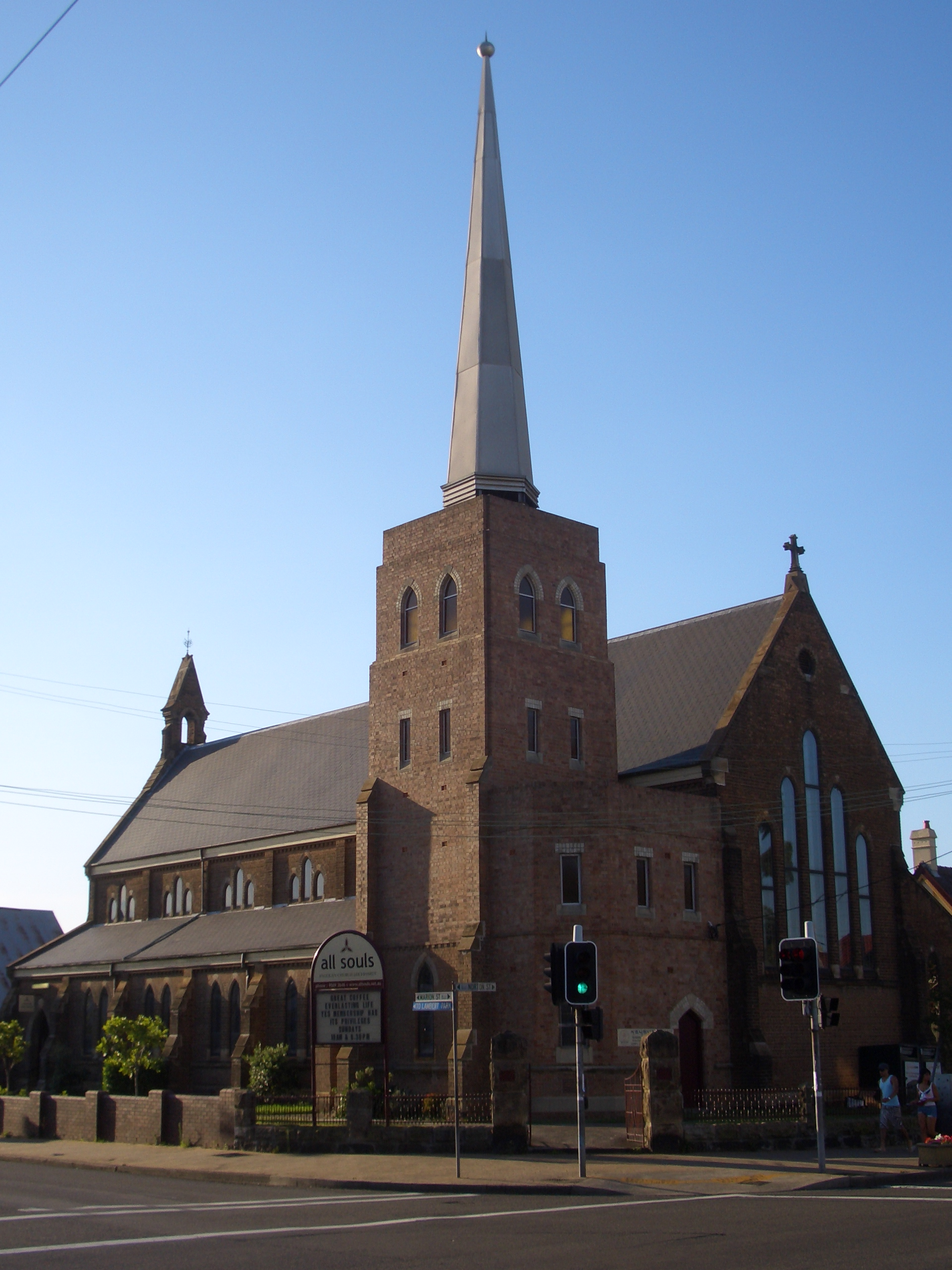
All Souls Anglican Church

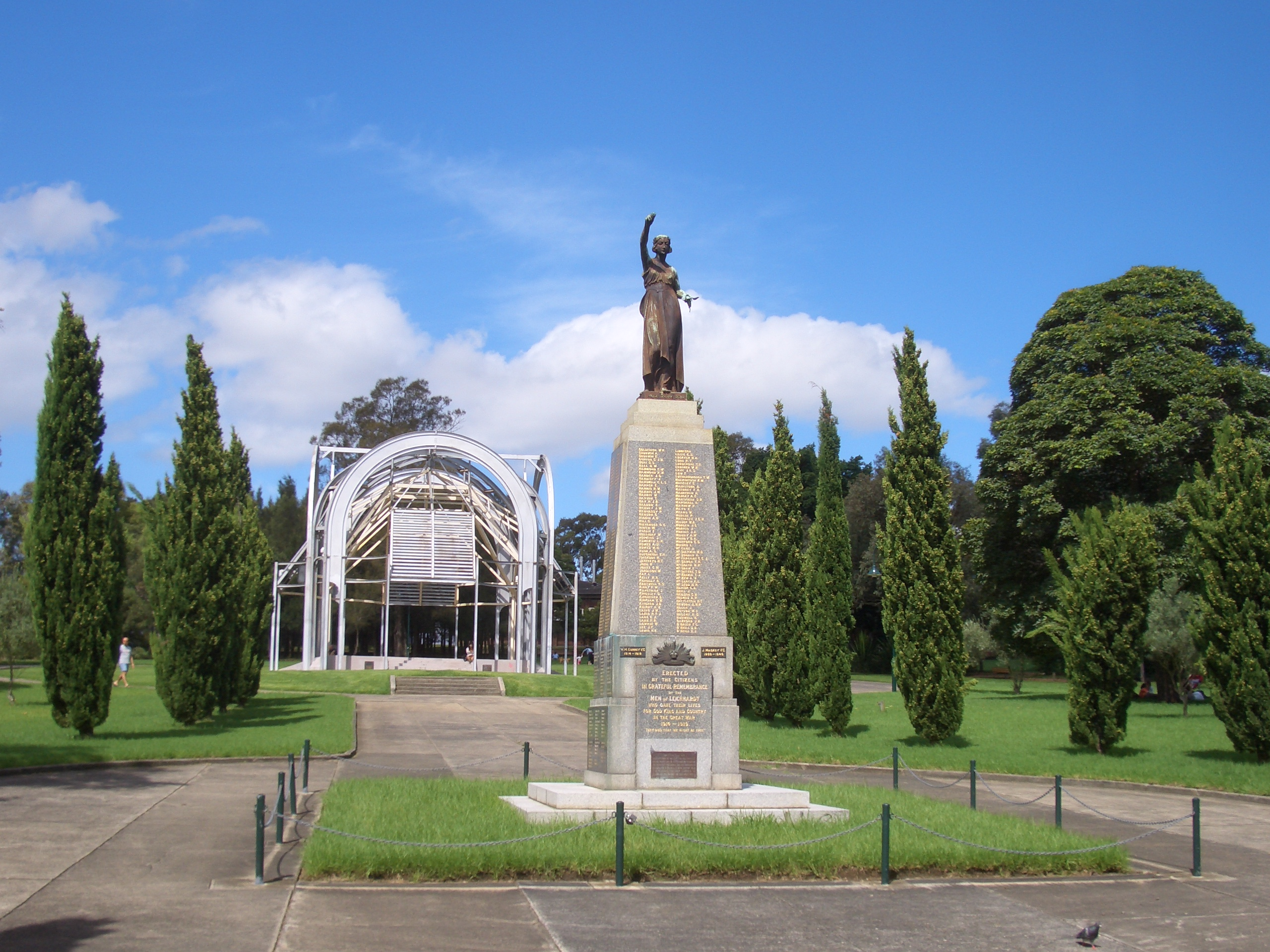
Pioneers Memorial Park

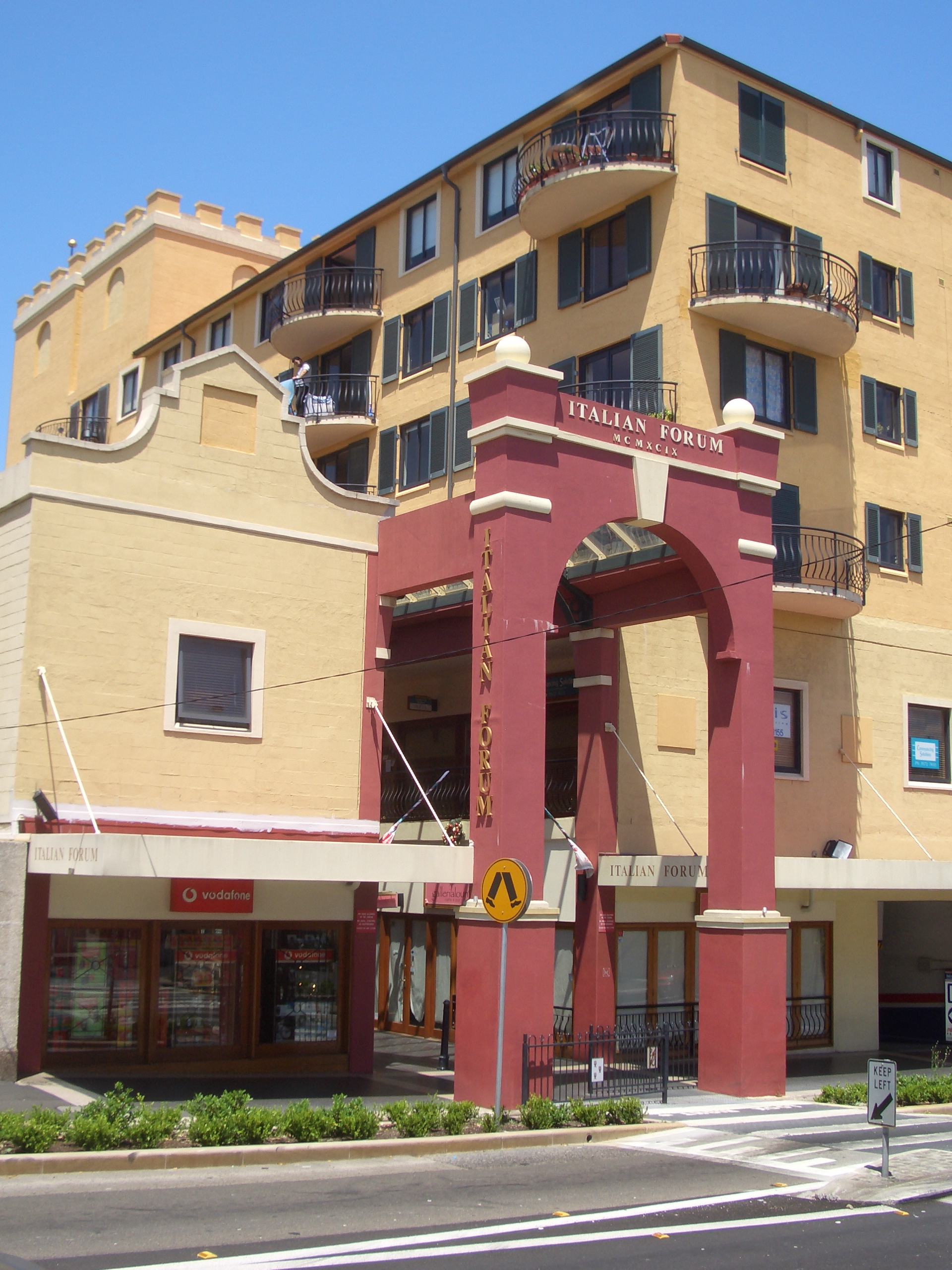
Italian Forum entrance

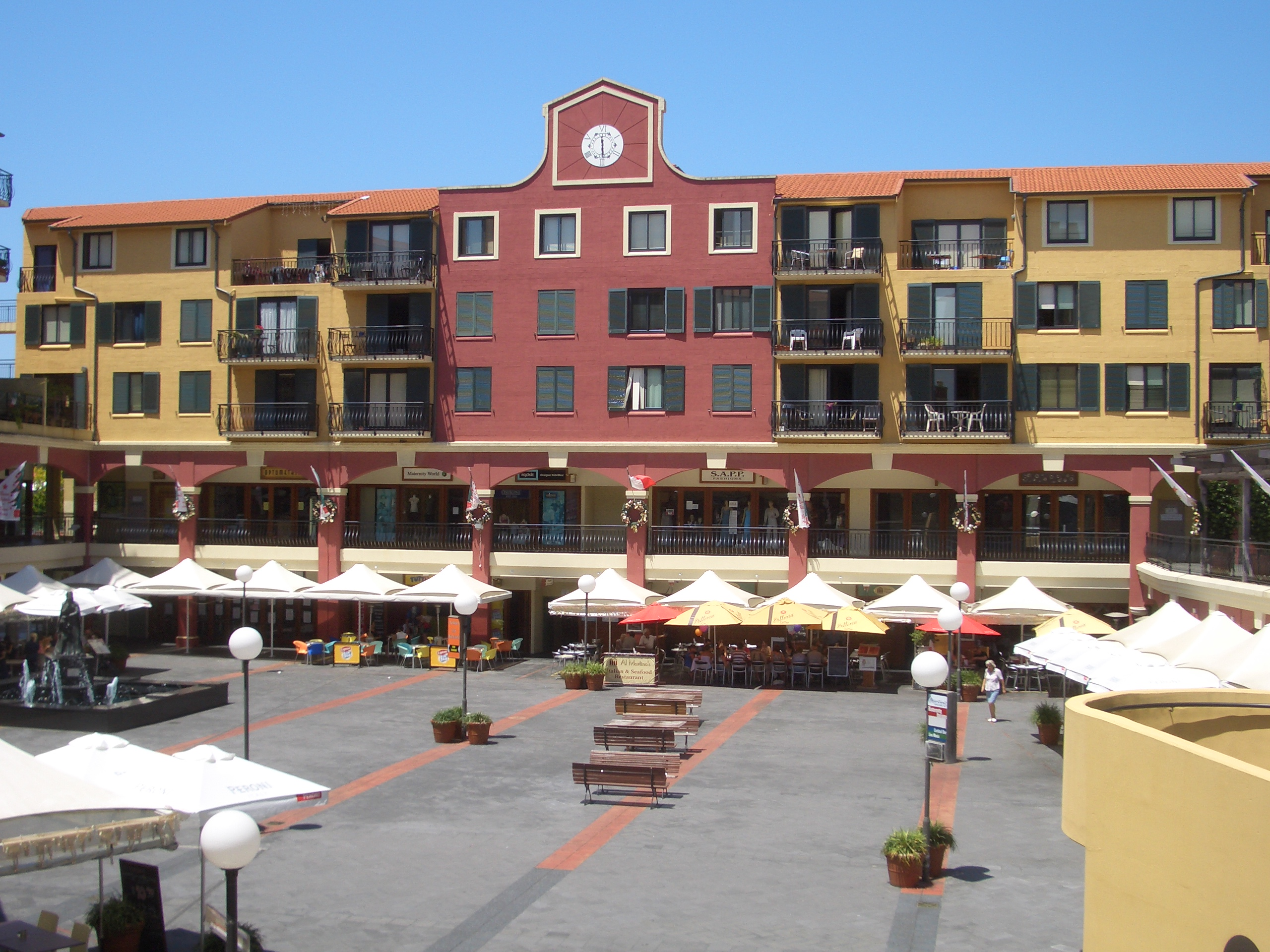
Piazza at the Italian Forum

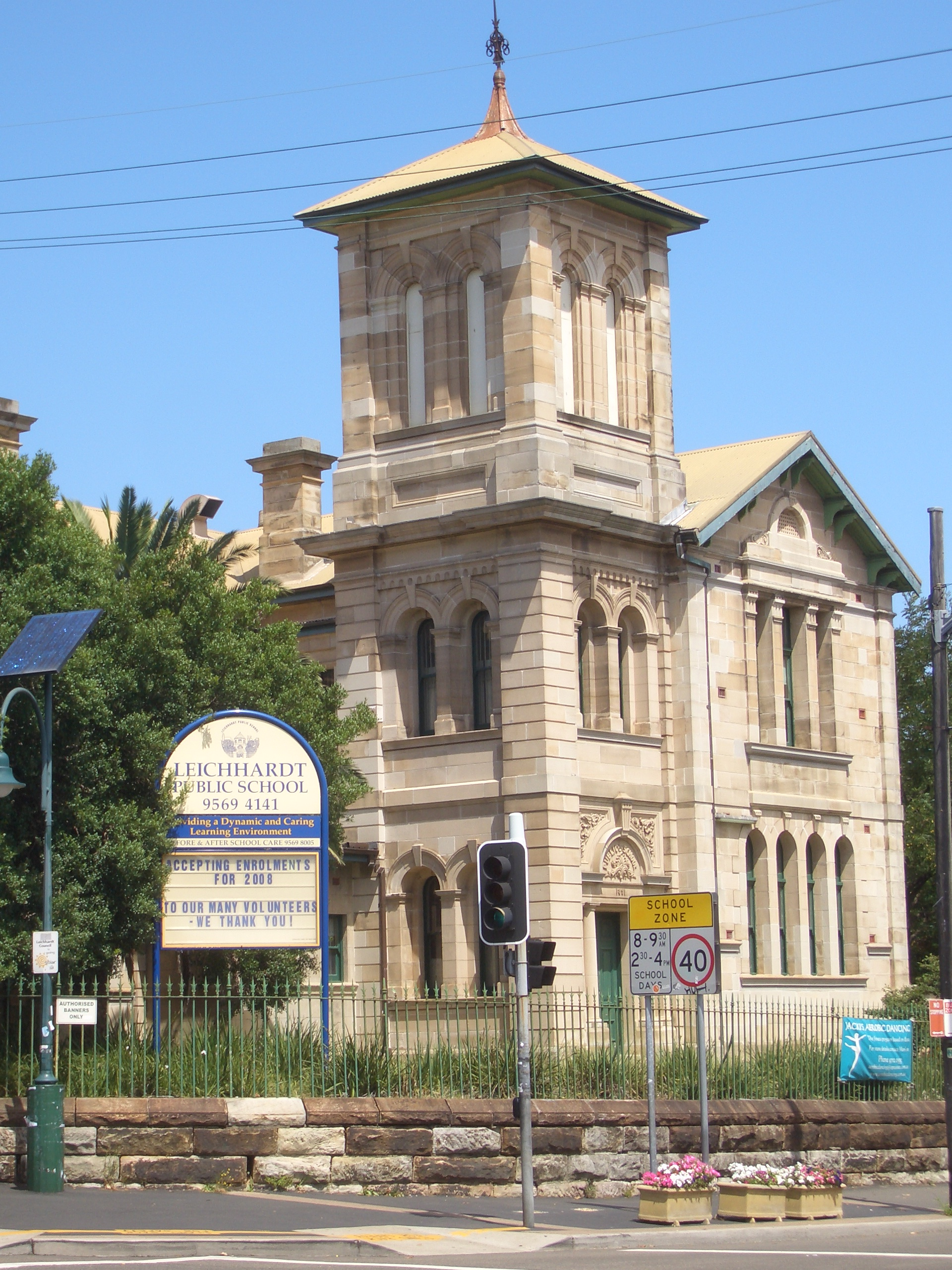
Leichhardt Public School

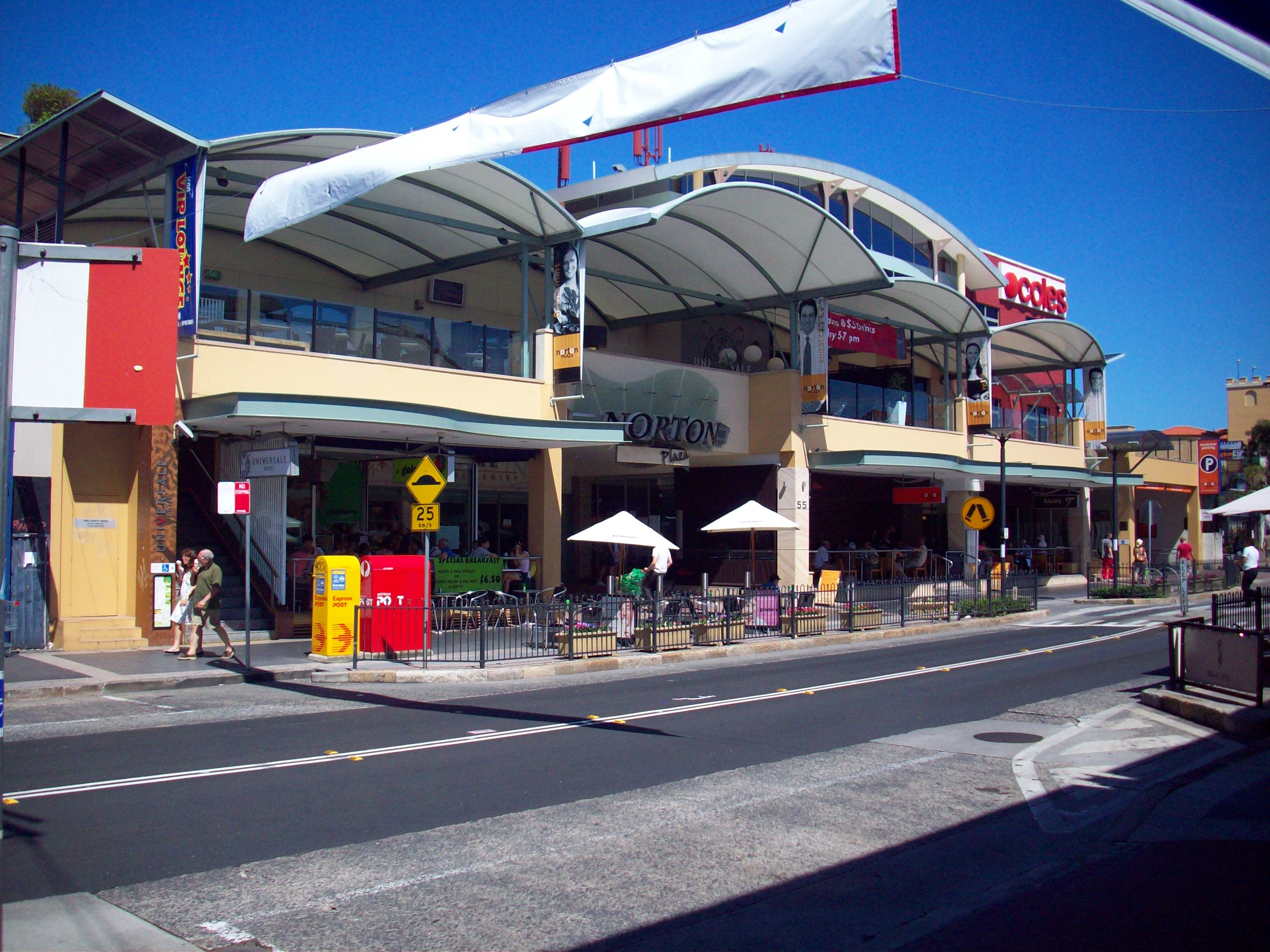
Norton Plaza
