= Canada Bay =

Bay in Sydney, Australia

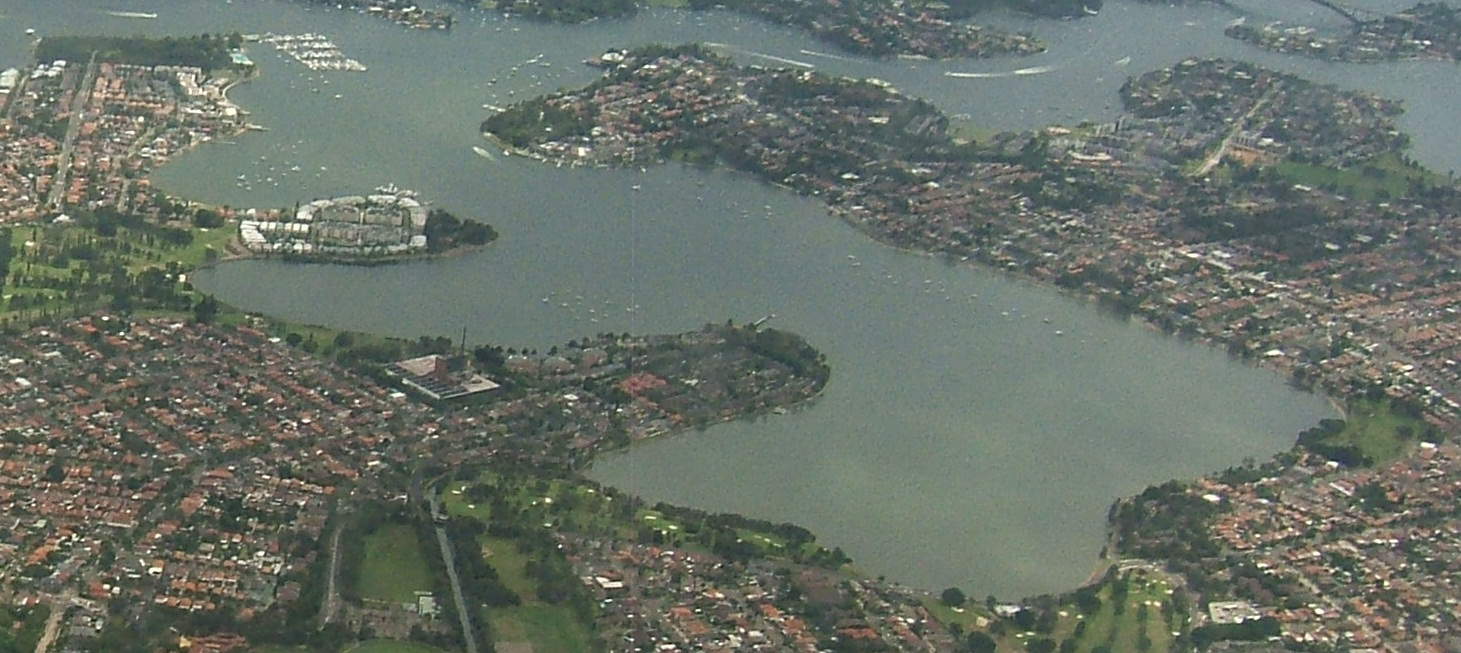
- Aerial image of Hen and Chicken Bay, looking north. Canada Bay is the inlet in the lower left.

- Location of Canada Bay in New South Wales
- Location: Inner-west Sydney, New South Wales
- Coordinates: 33°51′24″S 151°07′04″E
- Type: Bay
- Primary outflows: Parramatta River
- Basin countries: Australia
- Frozen: never
- Settlements: Canada Bay

Canada Bay is an estuarine bay on the Parramatta River, in the inner-west of Sydney, in the state of New South Wales, Australia. It is the innermost inlet of the larger Hen and Chicken Bay. Two other bays to the north of Canada Bay are two other bays named for Canadian internment camps for convicts involved in the Lower Canada Rebellion:

- Exile Bay – surrounded by Massey Park Golf Club and Prince Edward Park
- France Bay – surrounded by residential area of Cabarita, New South Wales

== Location and features ==
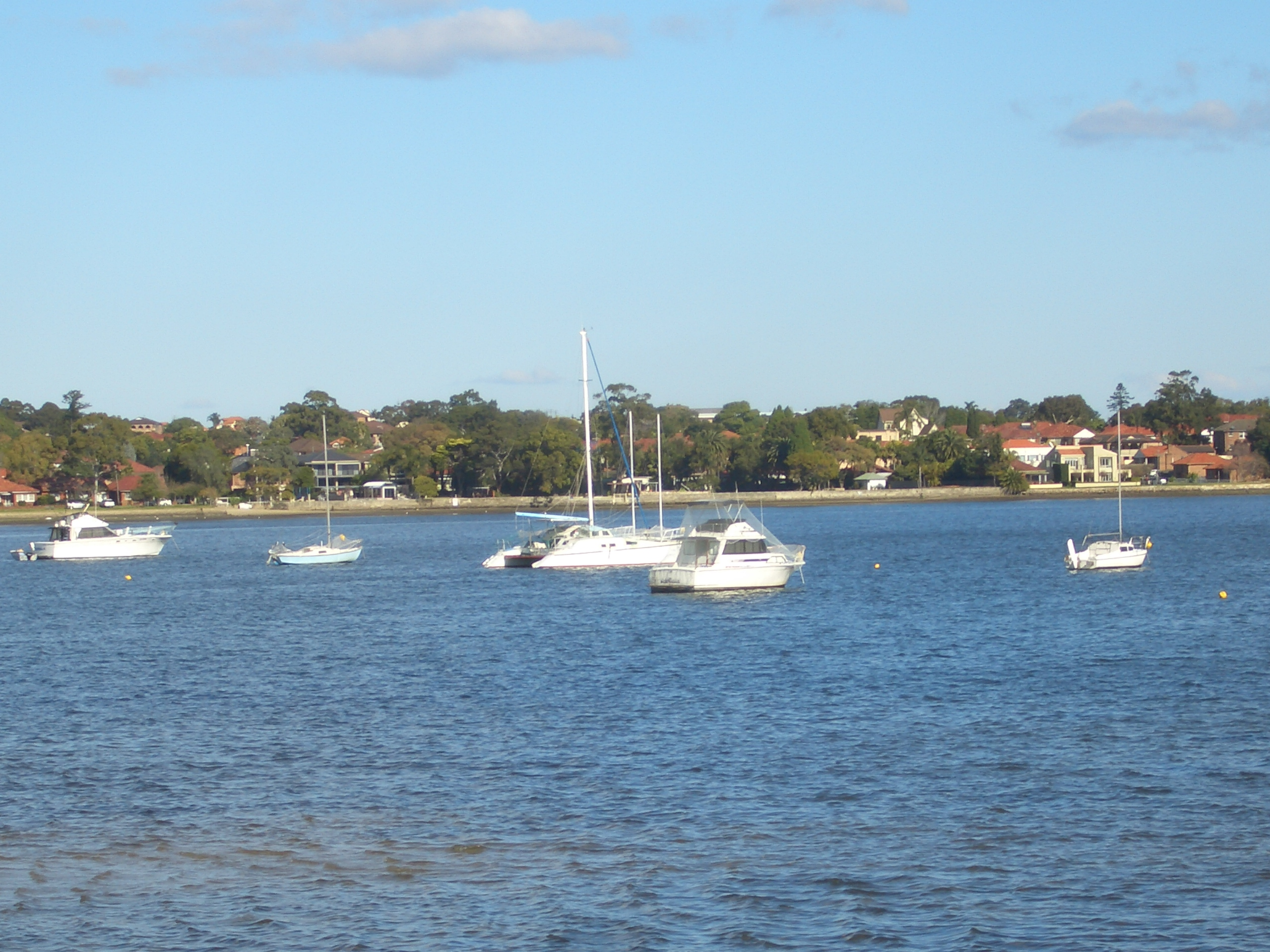
Boats on Canada Bay.

The shoreline of Canada Bay is largely open parkland, with some residential use to the north and east. The City West Link Road, a major arterial road, runs along the southern shore of the bay.

A suburb on the shore of the bay is named after it, as is the City of Canada Bay, the local government area encompassing a large portion of inner-western Sydney.

== History ==
The name Canada Bay honours a link between Australia and Canada. Following the Lower Canada Rebellion of 1837 to 1838, two Irish and 58 French Canadian rebels were deported to Australia. At the request of the local Catholic bishop, they were brought to Sydney. Imprisoned at Longbottom Stockade (which was located at what is now Concord Oval), the convicts broke stone for the construction of Parramatta Road and collected oyster shells for making lime. In 1842, the French Canadians were allowed to work outside the prison. Between 1843 and 1844, all received pardons and, except for two people who died and one (Joseph Marceau) who settled in Dapto all returned to Canada.

After the rebellions, the Australian Governor General and High Commissioner to Canada recommended that Britain grant responsible self-government to the Union of Upper and Lower Canada. In the 1850s, the Australian colonies achieved responsible government and parliamentary democracy. Many parts of Canada Bay are a reminder of this history: Exile Bay, France Bay, Durham Street, Marceau Drive, Polding Street and Gipps Street. Bayview Park, occupying the headland at the northern end of the bay, has a plaque that honours the exiles and marks the point of disembarkation.
