= Hen and Chicken Bay =

Bay in New South Wales, Australia

Coordinates: 33.852°S 151.122°E

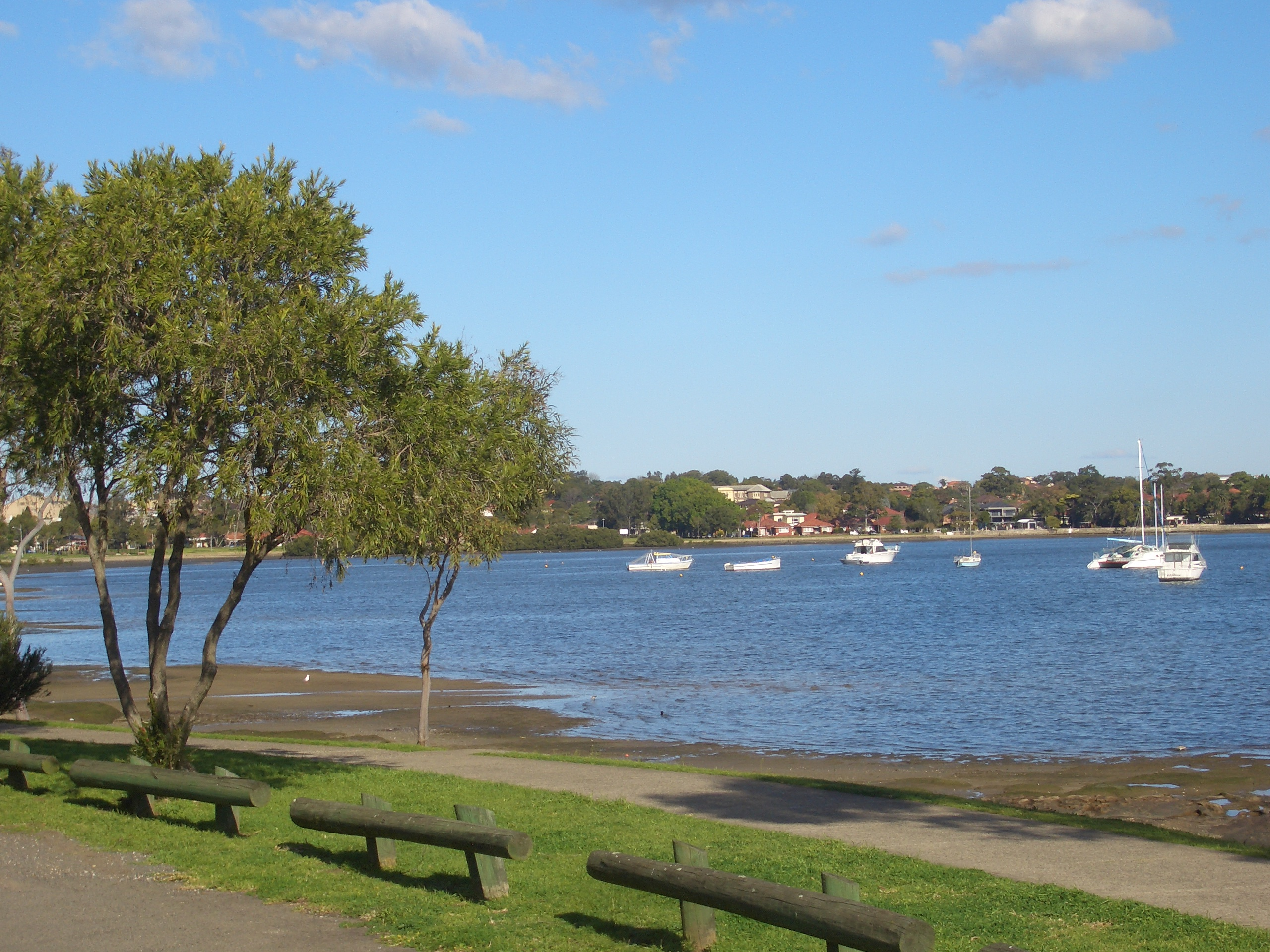
Hen and Chicken Bay, viewed from Wareemba, 2007

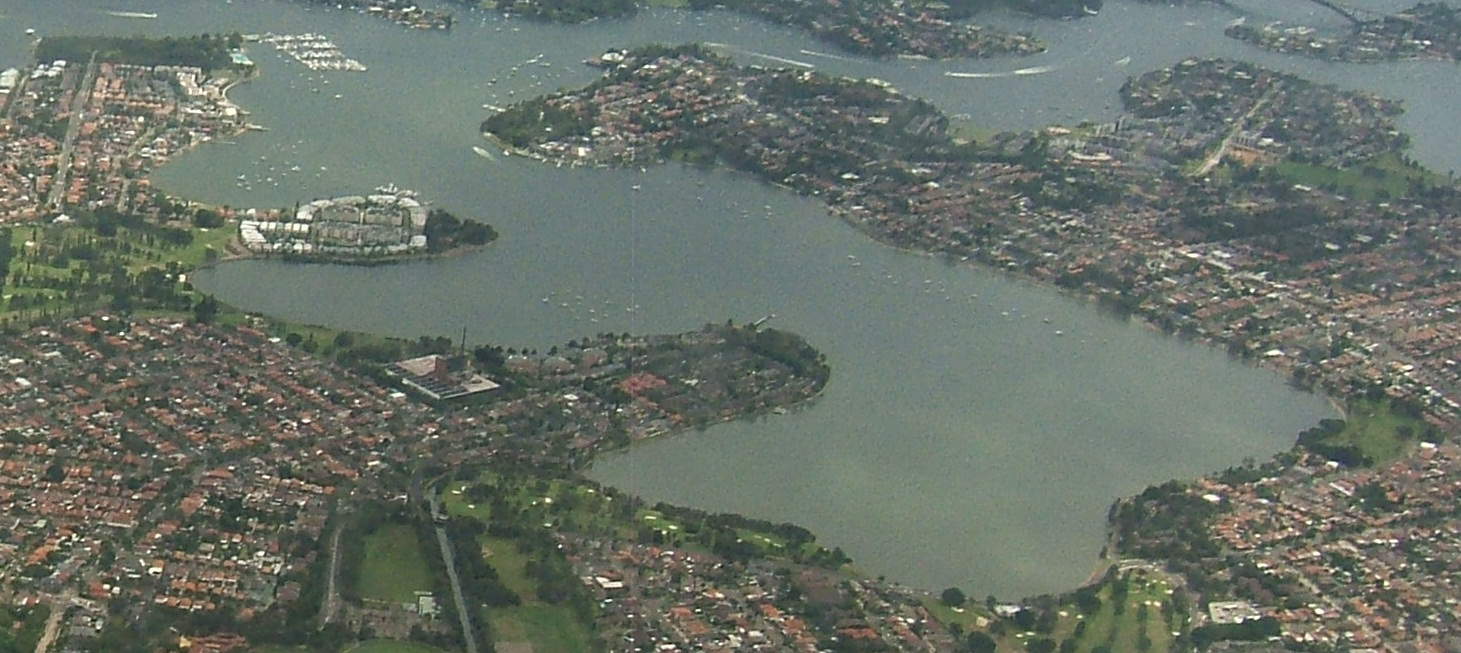
Aerial image of the bay, looking north, 2010

Hen and Chicken Bay is a bay on the Parramatta River, in the inner-west of Sydney, in the state of New South Wales, Australia. It lies approximately eight kilometres (5.0 mi) due west of Sydney's central business district. It is surrounded by the suburbs of Abbotsford, Drummoyne, Wareemba, Five Dock, Canada Bay, Concord and Cabarita. There is no firm evidence of the origin of the name. One suggestion is that two sandstone boulders near the entrance of the bay resemble a hen and chicken.

Hen and Chicken Bay is a large bay, and some of its sub-inlets are separately named, including (clockwise from south) Kings Bay, Canada Bay, Exile Bay and France Bay. Canada, Exile and France Bays are all named after internment camps placed there to house convicts from the Lower Canada Rebellion.

In the early days of the colony of New South Wales, the bay was sometimes known as Stonequarry Cove and Stone Quarry Creek. That may have been because there was once a quarry nearby at Five Dock.

Much of the land around the bay is publicly accessible foreshore or parkland. The bay is a popular location for rowing regattas.

It is also the home of the Hen & Chicken Bay surf life saving club (SLSC), which holds occasional patrols on the waterway. It is a voluntary organisation which was formed by a number of locals, including Trevor Folsom, to spread the word about water safety locally and abroad, and they have a number of alliance relationships with similar clubs. Fund-raising for a permanent clubhouse on the bay is ongoing.
