= City of Canada Bay =

- Local government area
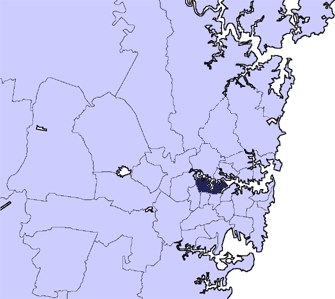
- Location in Metropolitan Sydney

- Interactive map of City of Canada Bay
- Coordinates: 33°51′S 151°09′E
- Country: Australia
- State: New South Wales
- Region: Inner West
- Established: 1 December 2000
- Council seat: Drummoyne

Government
  - Mayor: Michael Megna
  - State electorates: Drummoyne; Strathfield; Auburn
  - Federal division: Reid

Area
  - Total: 19.93 km^{2} (7.70 sq mi)

Population
  - Totals: 89,177 (2021 census); 91,385 (2023 estimate)
  - Density: 4,585/km^{2} (11,880/sq mi)
- Website: City of Canada Bay
LGAs around City of Canada Bay
Ryde	Ryde	Hunter's Hill
City of Parramatta	City of Canada Bay	Inner West
Strathfield	Burwood	Inner West

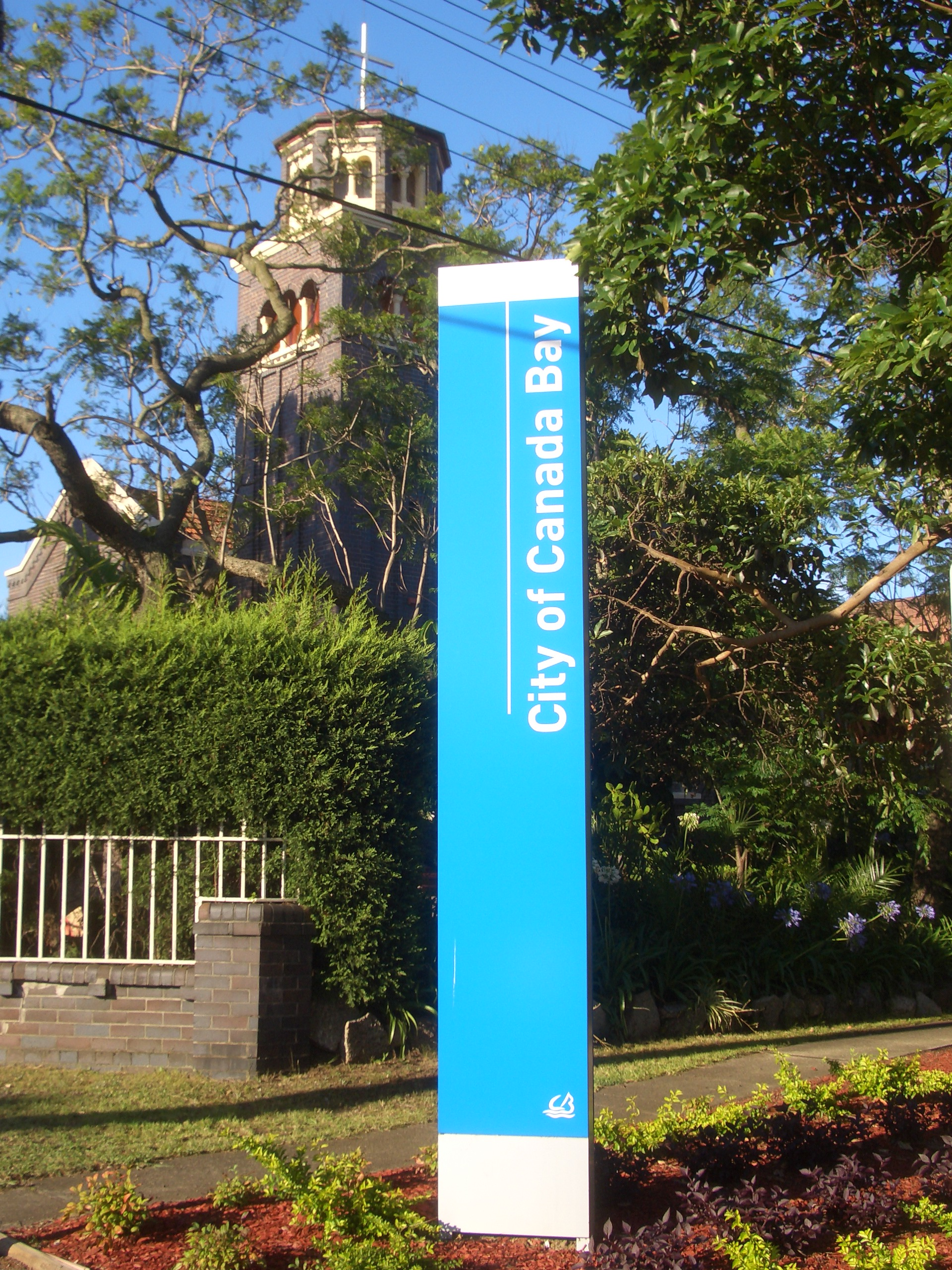
City of Canada Bay sign, Concord Road, North Strathfield

The City of Canada Bay is a local government area in the Inner West region of Sydney, New South Wales, Australia. The city was formed on 1 December 2000, following the merger of Concord and Drummoyne councils. The city covers an area of 19.82 square kilometres (7.65 sq mi) and as at the 2021 census had a resident population of 89,177. The city is ultimately named after Canada Bay, a bay and suburb along the Parramatta River.

Councillor Michael Megna was appointed to be mayor on 25 January 2024, and the deputy mayor is Anthony Bazouni.

== Location and topography ==
The City of Canada Bay is located in the northern part of the Inner West region of Sydney. To the north it is bounded by the Parramatta River, and to the south by Parramatta Road. In the east and west, it is bounded by two large bays: Iron Cove in the east, and Homebush Bay in the west. At its centre is a third large bay, Hen and Chicken Bay. (The eponymous Canada Bay is an inlet of the larger Hen and Chicken Bay.) As a result, the area is largely in the form of two peninsulas, linked by a narrow strip of land at its centre, which is the location of the eponymous suburb of Canada Bay. As a result of its geographical layout, many of the suburbs in the City of Canada Bay enjoy water frontages onto one of the bays of Parramatta River.

== Suburbs and localities in the local government area ==
Suburbs in the City of Canada Bay are:

- Abbotsford
- Breakfast Point
- Cabarita
- Canada Bay
- Chiswick
- Concord
- Concord West
- Drummoyne
- Five Dock
- Liberty Grove
- Mortlake
- North Strathfield
- Rhodes
- Rodd Point
- Russell Lea
- Strathfield (minor, with most of the suburb within Strathfield and other parts in Burwood)
- Wareemba

Some of the localities in the City of Canada Bay are:

- Birkenhead Point
- Concord Repatriation General Hospital
- Concord Oval

== Demographics ==
At the 2021 census there were approximately 89,177 people in the Canada Bay Local Government Area; of these 48.2 per cent identified as male and 51.8 per cent identified as female. Aboriginal and Torres Strait Islander people made up 0.6 per cent of the population. The median age of people in the City of Canada Bay was 39 years. Children aged 0 – 14 years made up 15.8 per cent of the population and people aged 65 years and over made up 17.0 per cent of the population. Of people in the area aged 15 years and over, 49.9 per cent were married and 10.3 per cent were either divorced or separated.

Population growth in the City of Canada Bay between the 2001 census and the 2006 census was 10.73 per cent; and in the subsequent five years to the 2011 census, population growth was 15.24 per cent. At the 2016 Census, the population in the City of Canada Bay increased by 16.17 per cent. When compared with total population growth of Australia for the same period, being 8.8 per cent, population growth in Canada Bay Local Government Area was nearly double the national average.

The median weekly income for residents within the City of Canada Bay was higher than the national average, this upwards trend could also be seen across family and personal incomes.

Selected historical Census data for Canada Bay Local Government Area
Census year		2001	2006	2011	2016	2021
Population	Estimated residents on census night	59,371	▲65,742	▲75,763	▲88,015	▲89,177
Population	LGA rank in terms of size within New South Wales			28th	▲27th	
Population	% of New South Wales population			1.10%	▲1.17%	▼1.10%
Population	% of Australian population	0.32%	▲0.33%	▲0.35%	▲0.38%	▼0.35%
Cultural and language diversity						
Ancestry, top responses	English			16.5%	▼15.4%	▲19.0%
Ancestry, top responses	Australian			16.3%	▼13.8%	▲17.6%
Ancestry, top responses	Chinese			9.1%	▲13.3%	▲16.2%
Ancestry, top responses	Italian			12.8%	▼12.6%	▲15.2%
Ancestry, top responses	Irish			7.5%	▼7.1%	▲8.6%
Language, top responses (other than English)	Mandarin	1.7%	▲2.7%	▲5.1%	▲9.8%	▼8.6%
Language, top responses (other than English)	Italian	12.2%	▼10.1%	▼8.8%	▼7.1%	▼6.0%
Language, top responses (other than English)	Korean	n/c	▲2.2%	▲3.1%	▲4.0%	▼3.2%
Language, top responses (other than English)	Cantonese	2.7%	▲3.3%	▲3.7%	▲3.9%	3.9%
Language, top responses (other than English)	Greek	3.3%	▼2.9%	▼2.8%	▼2.2%	▼2.1%
Religious affiliation						
Religious affiliation, top responses	Catholic	43.4%	▼41.7%	▼39.2%	▼33.9%	▼33.7%
Religious affiliation, top responses	No religion, so described	11.1%	▲13.4%	▲18.6%	▲27.7%	▲31.5%
Religious affiliation, top responses	Not stated	n/c	n/c	n/c	▲8.7%	▼5.3%
Religious affiliation, top responses	Anglican	15.8%	▼13.4%	▼11.2%	▼7.9%	▲6.4%
Religious affiliation, top responses	Eastern Orthodox	5.1%	5.1%	▲7.2%	▼4.2%	▲4.4%
Median weekly incomes						
Personal income	Median weekly personal income		$664	▲$782	▲$882	▲$1,107
Personal income	% of Australian median income		142.5%	▼135.5%	▼133.2%	▲137.5%
Family income	Median weekly family income		$1,510	▲$2,152	▲$2,361	▲$2,870
Family income	% of Australian median income		147.0%	▼145.3%	▼136.2%	▼135.3%
Household income	Median weekly household income		$1,773	▲$1,817	▲$2,061	▲$2,371
Household income	% of Australian median income		151.4%	▼147.2%	▼143.3%	▼135.7%
Dwelling structure						
Dwelling type	Separate house		51.2%	▼45.5%	▼38.6%	▼37.0%
Dwelling type	Semi-detached, terrace or townhouse		10.6%	▲12.0%	▼9.3%	▲9.6%
Dwelling type	Flat or apartment		37.6%	▲41.8%	▲50.7%	▲52.2%

== Council ==
=== Current composition and election method ===
Canada Bay City Council is composed of nine councillors, including the mayor, for a fixed four-year term of office. The mayor has been directly elected since 2004 while the eight other councillors are elected proportionally as one ward. The most recent election was held on 14 September 2024.

Party	Councillors
Liberal	5
Labor	3
Greens	1
Total	9

The current Council, elected in 2024, in order of election, is:

Councillor	Party	Notes
Michael Megna	Liberal	Mayor 2024–present
Charles Jago	Greens	
Andrew Ferguson	Labor	
Anthony Bazouni	Liberal	
Hugo Robinson	Liberal	
Maria Cirillo	Labor	
Sylvia Lee	Liberal	
David Mansford	Labor	
Mastourah Meuross	Liberal	

== Election results ==
=== 2024 ===
2024 New South Wales local elections: Canada Bay
Party	Candidate	Votes	%	±%
Greens	1. Charles Jago (elected 1); 2. Tailoi Ling; 3. Neil Smith; 4. Pauline Tyrrell; 5. Tony Adams	7,836	16.39	+6.59
Labor	1. Andrew Ferguson (elected 2); 2. Maria Cirillo (elected 5); 3. David Mansford (elected 7); 4. Vivek Goyal; 5. Kathryn Zerk; 6. Jessica Handley; 7. Xiaojun Li	18,018	37.70	+8.4
Liberal	1. Michael Megna; 2. Anthony Bazouni (elected 3); 3. Hugo Robinson (elected 4); 4. Eunbong (Sylvia) Lee (elected 6); 5. Mastourah Meuross (elected 8); 6. Chris Burt; 7. Samantha Andreacchio	21,647	45.29	+15.49
Libertarian	Kurt Pudniks	295	0.62	+0.62
Total formal votes		47,796	94.86	−0.54
Informal votes		2,592	5.14	+0.54
Turnout		50,388	85.04	−0.56

=== 2021 ===
Elected councillor	Party
Michael Megna	Liberal
Stephanie Di Pasqua	Liberal
Anthony Bazouni	Liberal
Julia Little	Labor
Andrew Ferguson	Labor
Joseph Cordaro	OLC
Carmela Ruggeri	OLC
Charles Jago	Greens

2021 New South Wales local elections: Canada Bay
Party	Candidate	Votes	%	±%
	Liberal	14,126	29.8	−8.8
	Labor	13,917	29.3	−6.1
	Our Local Community	12,867	27.1	+27.1
	Greens	4,653	9.8	−1.5
	Independent	1,909	4.0	−4.2
Total formal votes		47,472	95.4	
Informal votes		2,312	4.6	
Turnout		49,784	85.6	
Party total seats			Seats	±
	Liberal		3	Steady
	Labor		2	▼1
	Our Local Community		2	▲2
	Greens		1	Steady
	Independent		0	▼1

=== 2017 ===
Elected councillor	Party
Michael Megna	Liberal
Julia Little	Labor
Charles Jago	Greens
Stephanie Di Pasqua	Liberal
Andrew Ferguson	Labor
Nicholas Yap	Liberal
Marian Parnaby	Labor
Daniela Ramondino	Independent (Group C)

2017 New South Wales local elections: Canada Bay
Party	Candidate	Votes	%	±%
Liberal		16,756	38.6	−5.9
Labor		15,383	35.4	−8.1
Greens		49,11	11.3	+0.8
Independent (Group C)		3,565	8.2	+8.2
Independent (Group B)		2,697	6.2	+6.2
Independent	Max Gergis	140	0.3	+0.3
Total formal votes		43,452	93.79	
Informal votes		2,878	6.21	
Turnout		46,330	80.67	

== History ==
A 2015 review of local government boundaries by the NSW Government Independent Pricing and Regulatory Tribunal recommended that the City of Canada Bay merge with adjoining councils. The government proposed a merger of the Burwood, Canada Bay, and Strathfield Councils to form a new council with an area of 41 square kilometres (16 sq mi) and support a population of approximately 163,000. In May 2016 Strathfield Council challenged the proposed merger between Strathfield, Burwood and Canada Bay and commenced proceedings in the New South Wales Land and Environment Court. After the Court heard that there were legal flaws in the report from the state government-appointed delegate who examined the proposal for merging the councils, the NSW Government withdrew from the case and the merger proposal stalled. In July 2017, the Berejiklian government decided to abandon the forced merger of the Strathfield, Burwood and Canada Bay local government areas, along with several other proposed forced mergers.

== See also ==
- List of local government areas of New South Wales
- City of Canada Bay Museum
