= Chiswick, New South Wales =

Chiswick
- Suburb
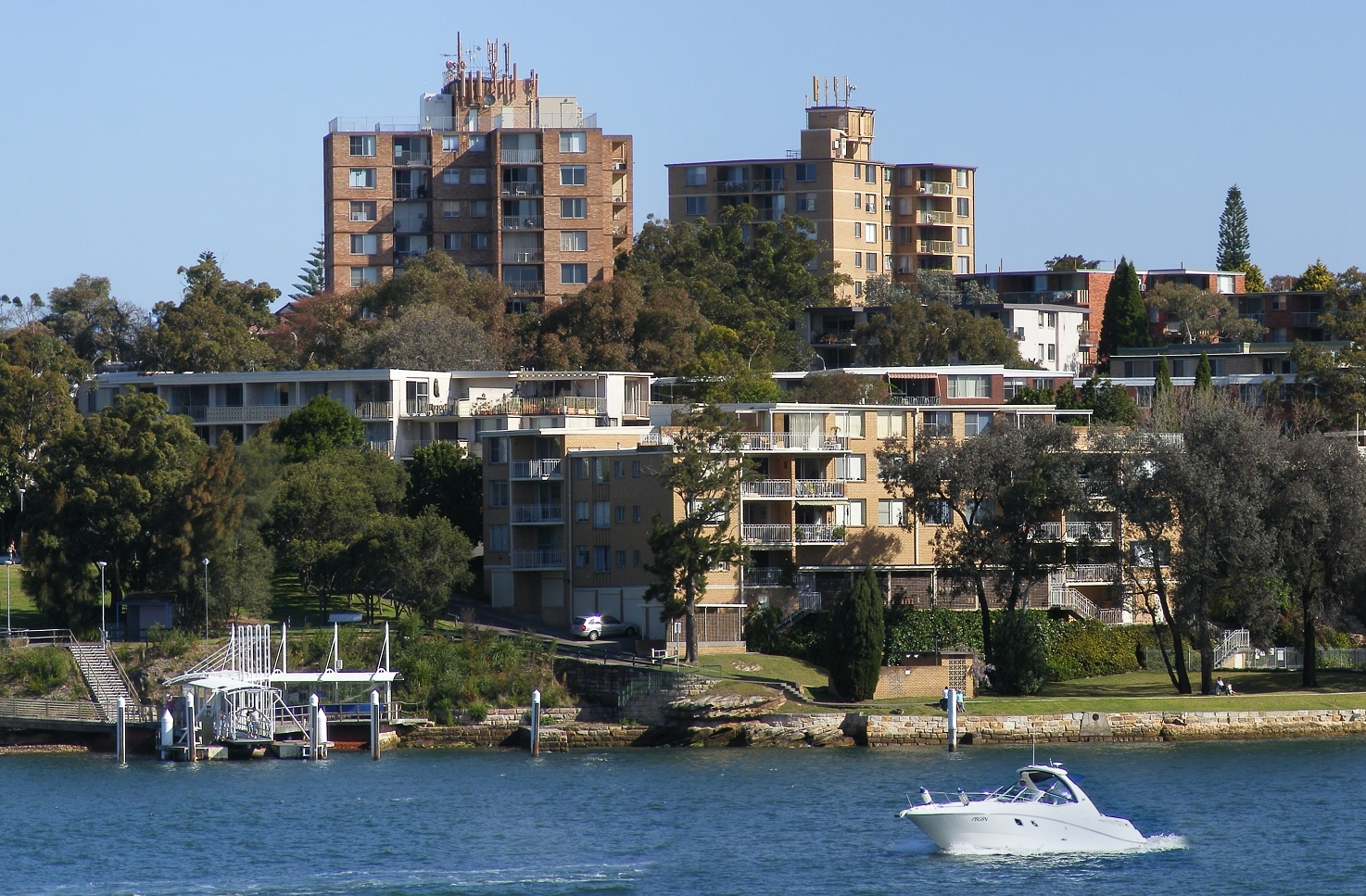
- Chiswick Ferry Wharf and apartments

- Interactive map of Chiswick
- Country: Australia
- State: New South Wales
- City: Sydney
- LGA: City of Canada Bay
- Location: 9 km (5.6 mi) west of Sydney CBD

Government
  - State electorate: Drummoyne
  - Federal division: Reid
- Elevation: 14 m (46 ft)

Population
  - Total: 2,909 (2021 census)
- Postcode: 2046
Suburbs around Chiswick
Henley	Huntleys Point	Drummoyne
Abbotsford	Chiswick	Drummoyne
Abbotsford	Wareemba	Russell Lea

Chiswick is a suburb in the Inner West of Sydney, in the state of New South Wales, Australia. It is located 9 kilometres (5.6 mi) west of the Sydney central business district in the local government area of the City of Canada Bay. Chiswick sits on the peninsula between Abbotsford Bay and Five Dock Bay, on the Parramatta River. It is surrounded by the suburbs of Abbotsford, Russell Lea and Drummoyne.

== History ==
The area around Chiswick was first known by its Aboriginal name Bigi Bigi. The suburb was originally part of Five Dock Farm. In the 1850s a Dr Fortescue owned an estate in this area which he named Chiswick after the village on the Thames, west of London. Parramatta River had been known as the 'Thames of the Antipodes' and other nearby suburbs were also named after Thames localities, such as Greenwich, Woolwich, Henley and Putney.

From 1884 until 1998, there was a wire mill on the waterfront at Chiswick.

More recently it has been subjected to an increase in the building of many modern apartment blocks, which has seen the population rise to around 2,400.

== Demographics ==
According to the 2021 census, there were 2,909 residents in Chiswick. The most common responses for ancestry in Chiswick were English 21.1%, Italian 17.4%, Australian 17.0%, Chinese 11.9% and Irish 10.0%. The median weekly household income in Chiswick was $2,444, higher than the national median of $1,746.

== Transport and commercial area ==
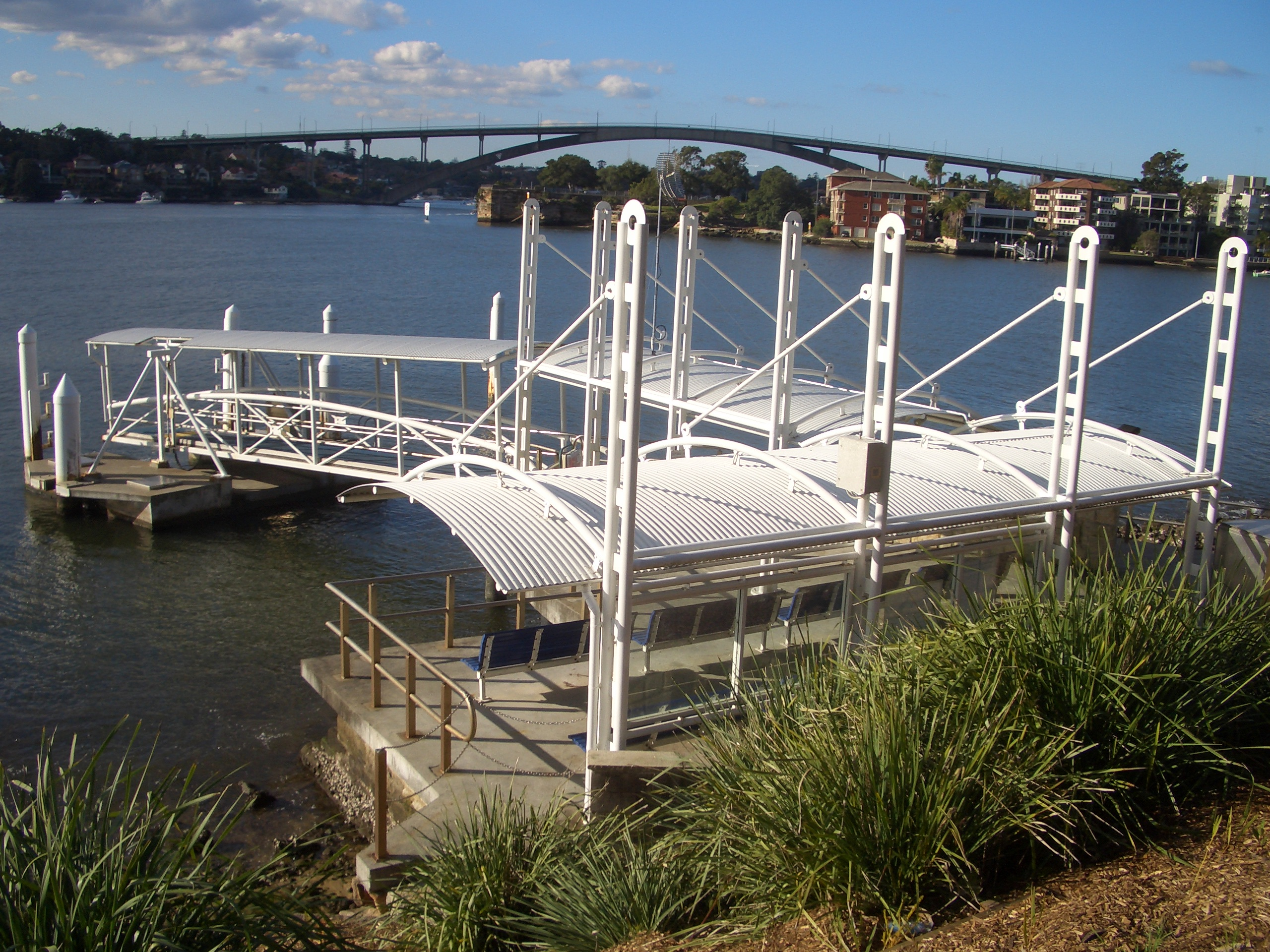
Chiswick Ferry Wharf

The Chiswick ferry wharf is used by Parramatta River ferry services. Transit Systems operate a terminus nearby, with buses running to Circular Quay either via Drummoyne and Victoria Road, or via Leichhardt and Parramatta Road as well as a route running to Campsie station via Burwood station. Chiswick has a small group of shops in Blackwall Point Road, close to the ferry wharf.
