= Cabarita, New South Wales =

Cabarita
- Suburb
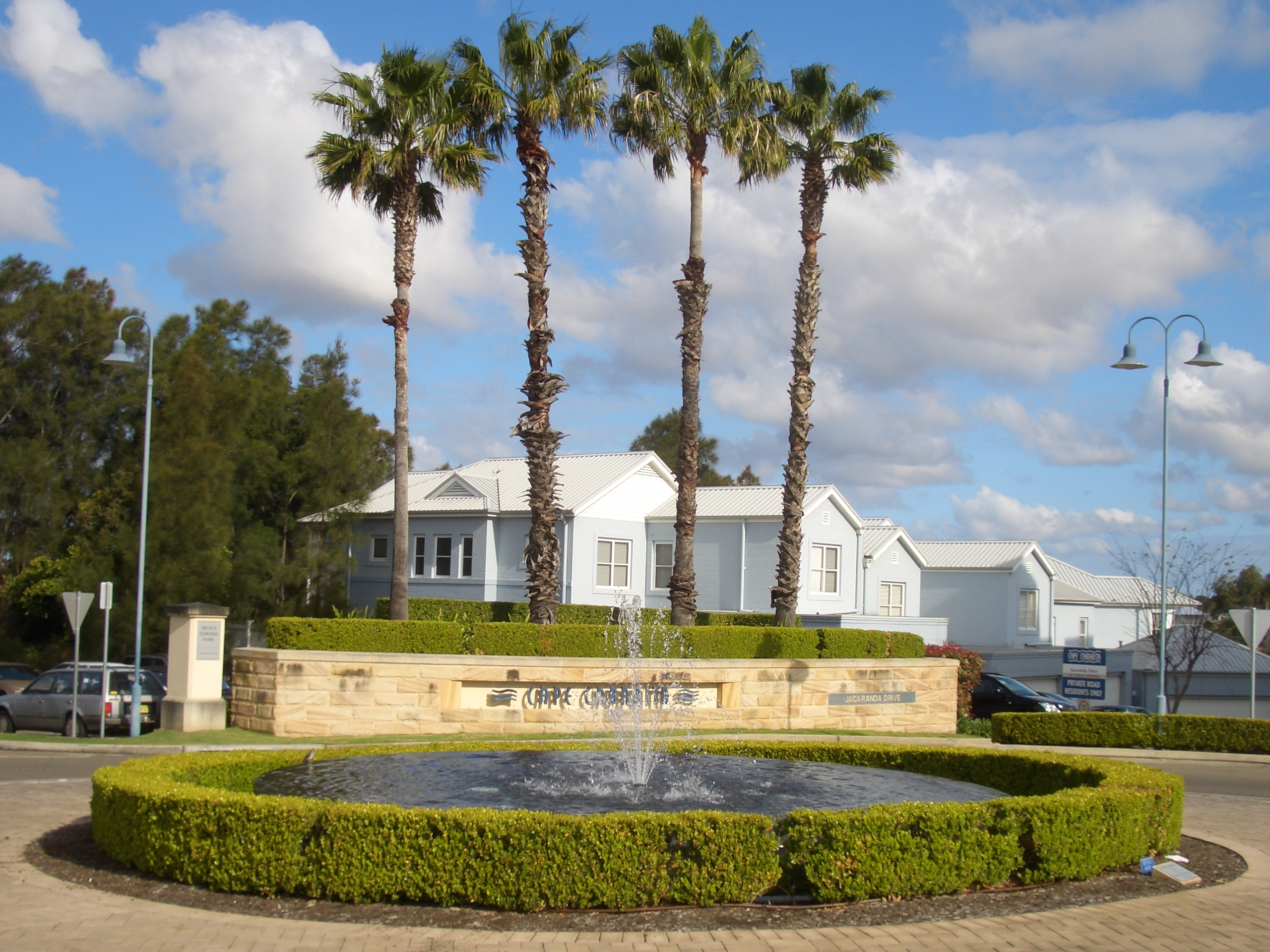
- Cape Cabarita

- Interactive map of Cabarita
- Country: Australia
- State: New South Wales
- City: Sydney
- LGA: City of Canada Bay
- Location: 16 km (9.9 mi) west of Sydney CBD

Government
  - State electorate: Drummoyne
  - Federal division: Reid
- Elevation: 16 m (52 ft)

Population
  - Total: 1,933 (2021 census)
- Postcode: 2137
Suburbs around Cabarita
Putney	Tennyson Point	Gladesville
Breakfast Point	Cabarita	Abbotsford
Concord	Canada Bay	Wareemba

Cabarita is a bayside suburb in the Inner West of Sydney, in the state of New South Wales, Australia. Cabarita is located 16 kilometres west of the Sydney central business district, in the local government area of the City of Canada Bay.

== Geography ==
Cabarita is a picturesque suburb on the Parramatta River, north of Concord. Opened in 2015, when the water was deemed clean and safe for swimmers after 70 years, the 200-metre long Cabarita Beach in Cabarita Park is one of the most proximate swimming beaches to many suburbs in western Sydney. The park features a shaded playground area, a large conservatory, a toddler pool, a kiosk, and barbecue spots with a hilly area that provides water views.

== History ==
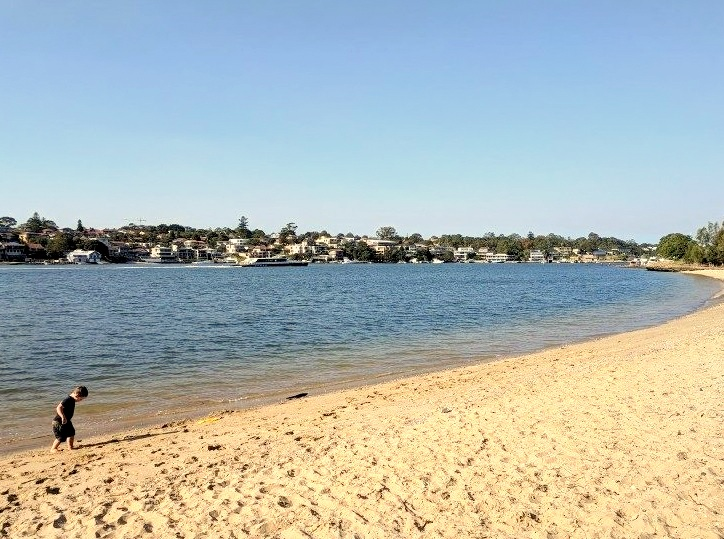
Cabarita Beach

Cabarita is an Aboriginal word meaning by the water.

David Anderson, a private soldier in the NSW Corps was granted land in this area in 1795. An area of Cabarita Point was reserved for public recreation in 1856. The reserve was expanded in 1880 with the addition of 9.7 hectares of adjoining land, known as Correy's Garden. The pavilion from which Governor-General Lord Hopetoun proclaimed the Federation of Australia in 1901 was later moved from Centennial Park to Cabarita Park.

In the past, the suburb consisted of swampland and heavy industry. Housing developments replaced the industry and the swamps. Until 1948, an electric tramway ran down Cabarita Road to connect the suburb with Burwood, Enfield and Ashfield via Cabarita Junction near the corner of Mortlake Street.

== Heritage listings ==
Cabarita has a number of heritage-listed sites, including:

- Cabarita Road: Federation Pavilion, Cabarita Park

== Demographics ==
According to the 2021 census of Population, there were 1,933 people in Cabarita. 63.1% of people were born in Australia. The next most common country of birth was China at 5.8%. 67.1% of people spoke only English at home. Other languages spoken at home included Mandarin 5.6% and Cantonese 4.9%. The most common responses for religion in Cabarita were Catholic 37.6%, No Religion 26.8% and Anglican 8.9%.

== Transport ==
Cabarita ferry wharf is served by Parramatta River ferry services.

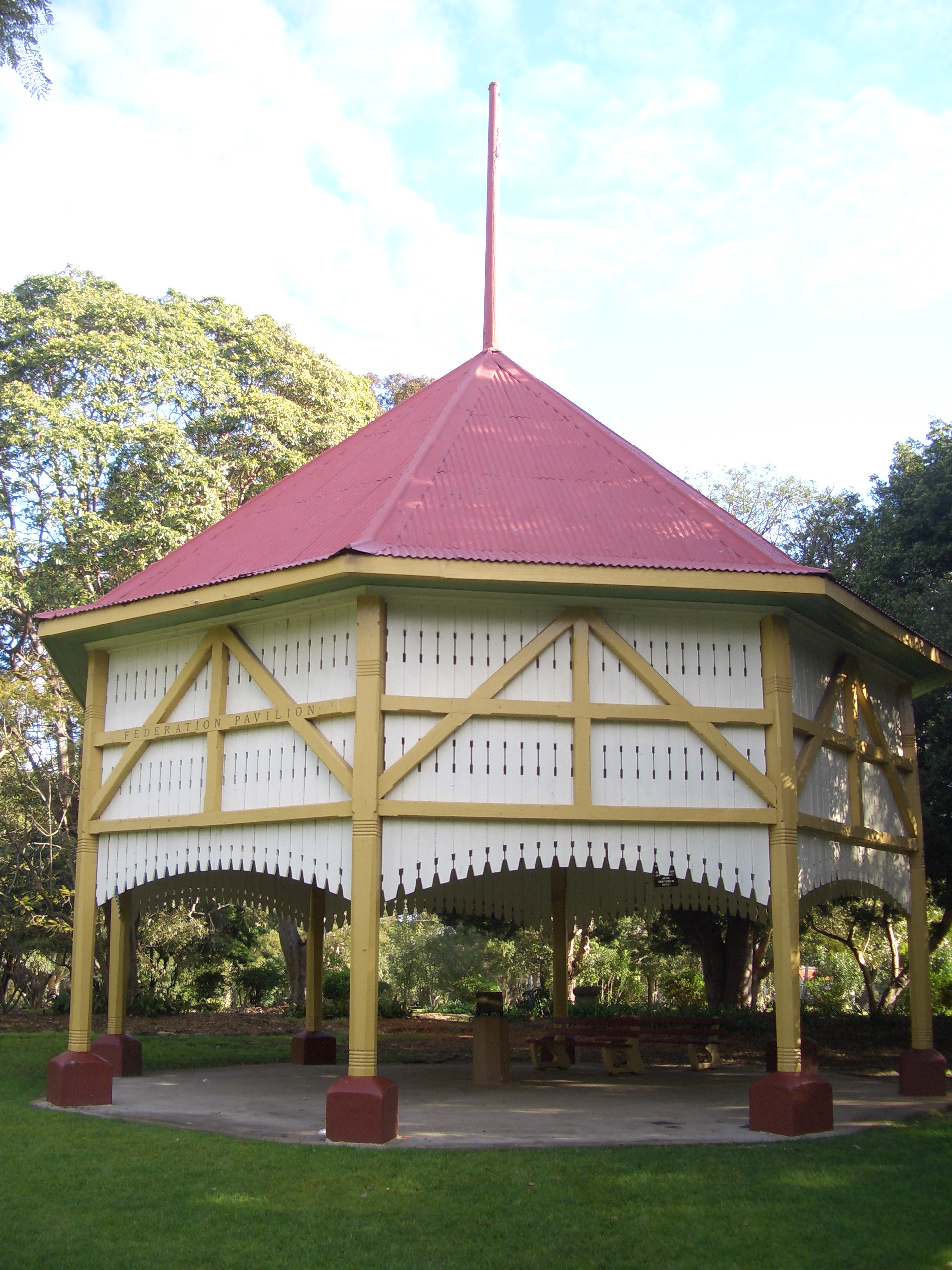
Federation Pavilion, Cabarita Park

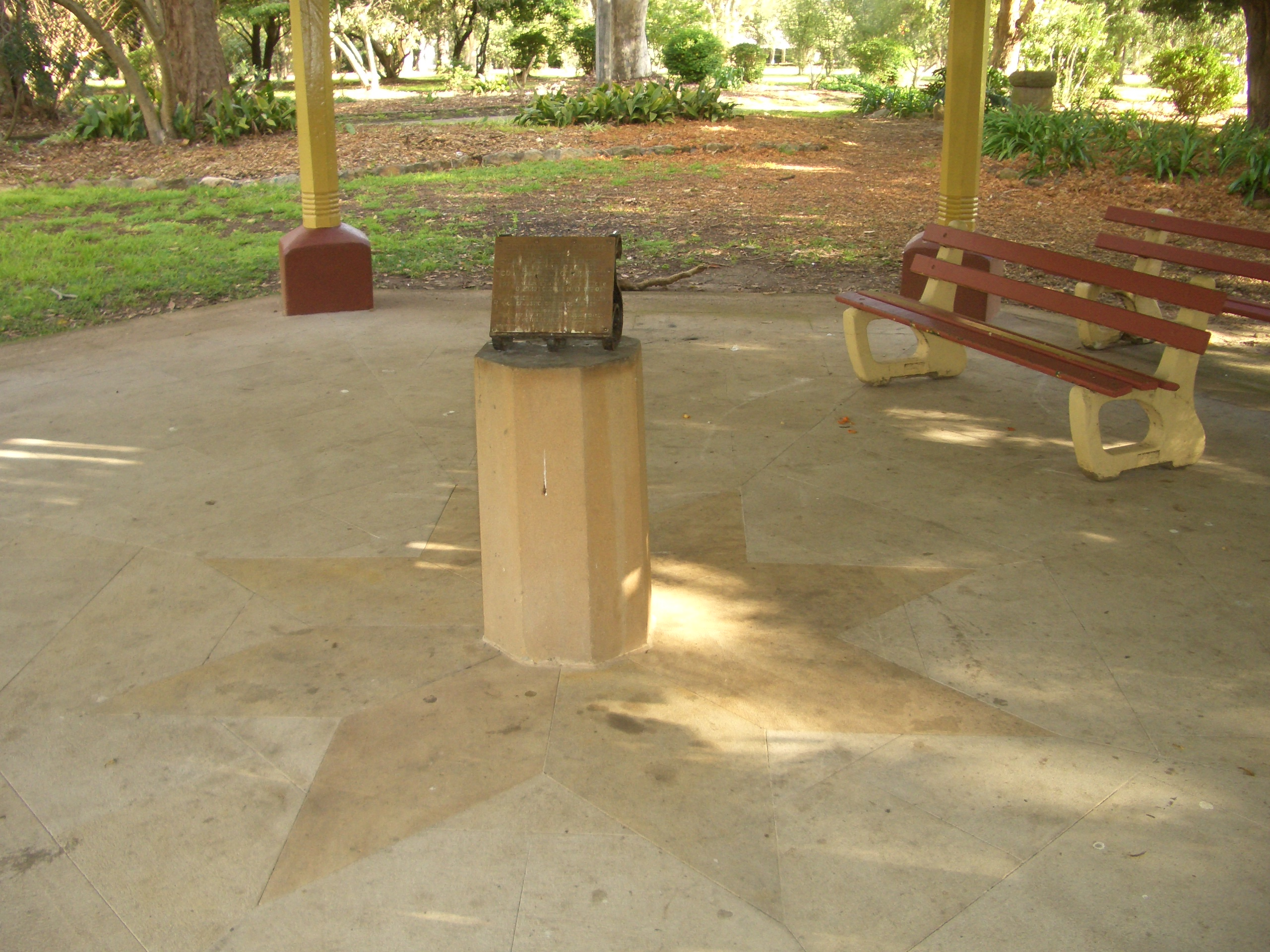
Federation Pavilion, Cabarita Park

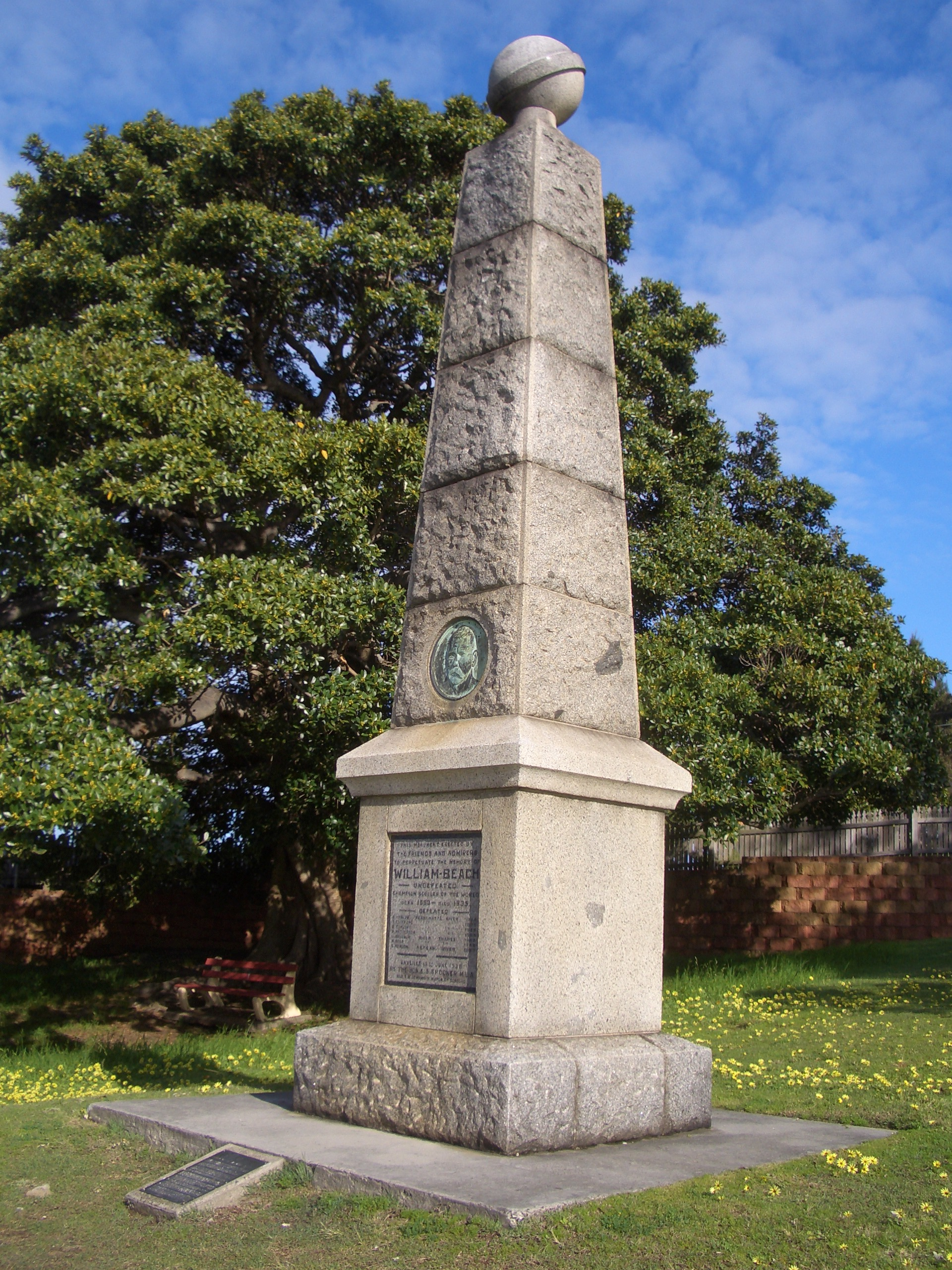
William Beach monument, Cabarita Park

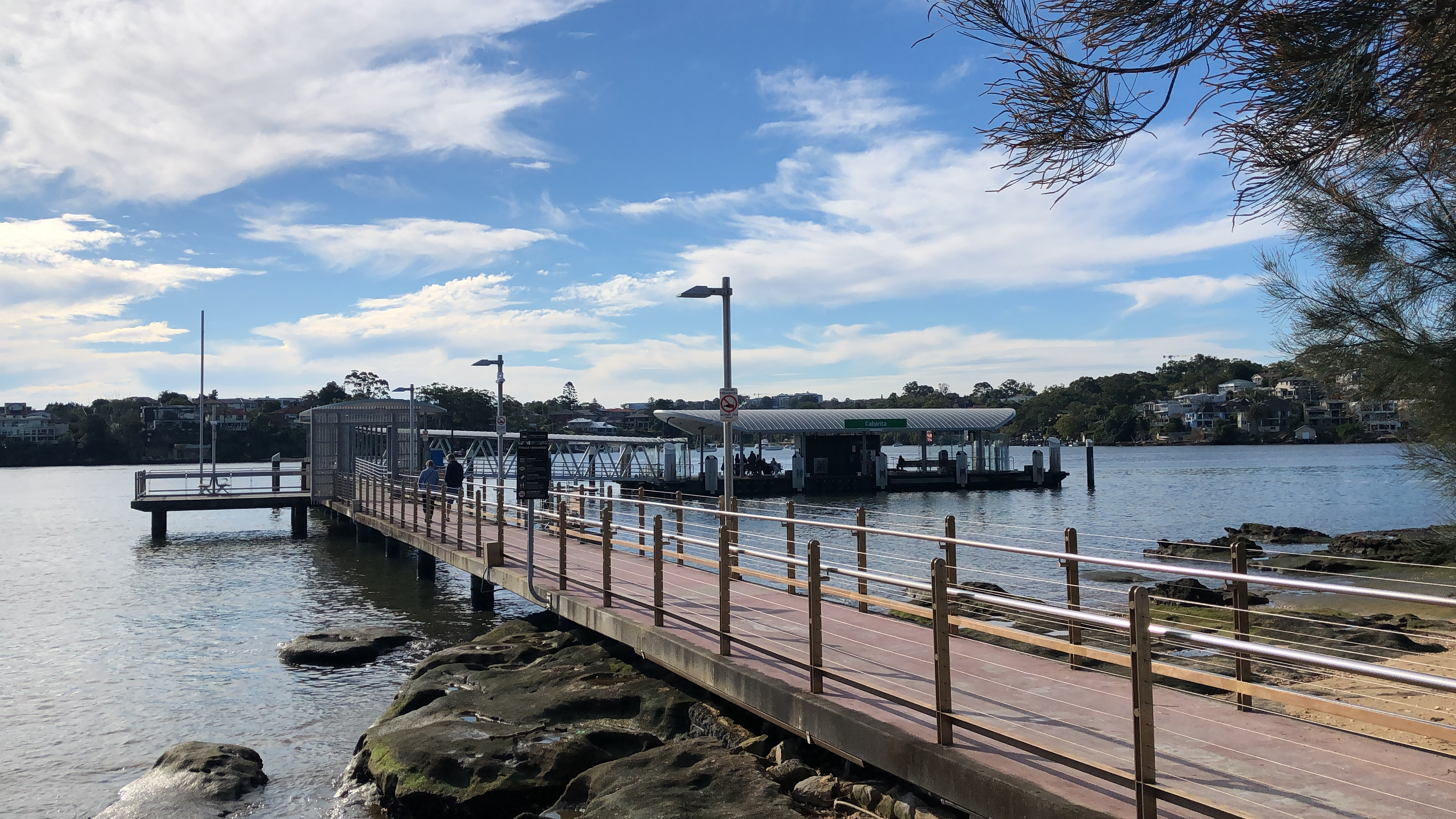
Cabarita ferry wharf

== Housing ==
Cabarita and the adjacent Breakfast Point have many new housing communities along the waterfront, such as Cape Cabarita and Edgewood. These developments feature many recreational facilities such as playing fields, gymnasiums, golf courses and some restaurants. Prince Edward Park sits beside Cape Cabarita.

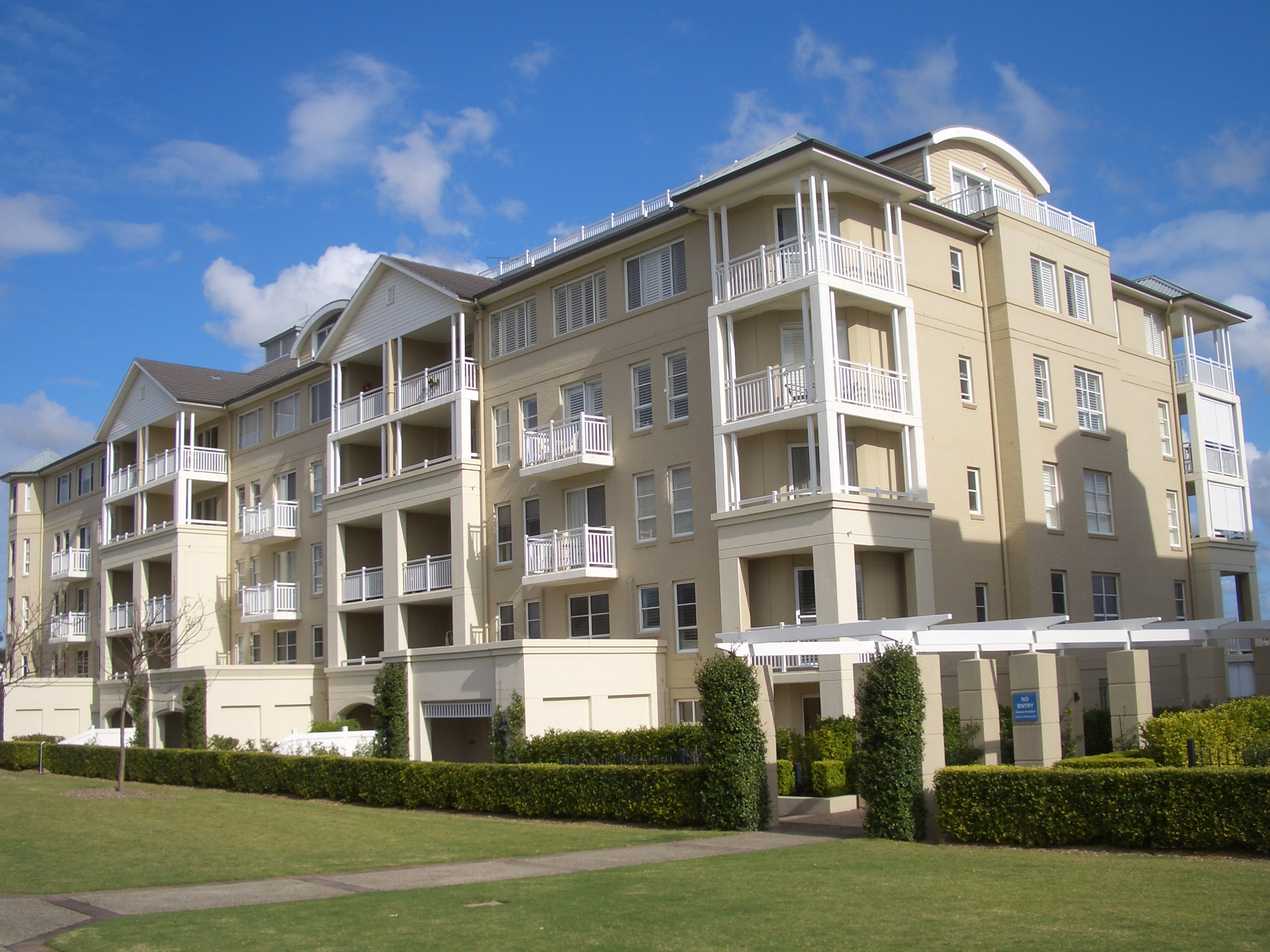
Cape Cabarita

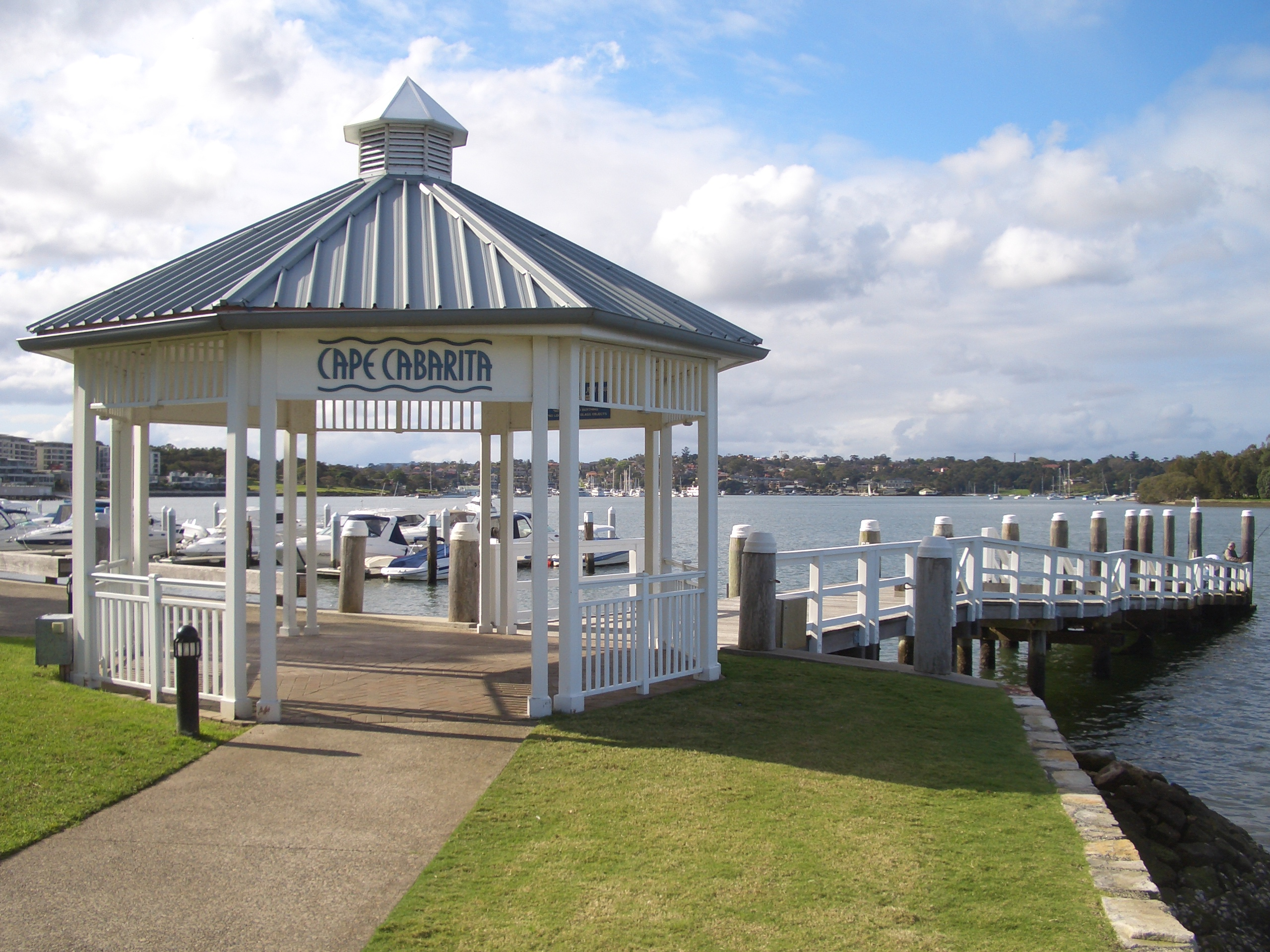
Cape Cabarita wharf

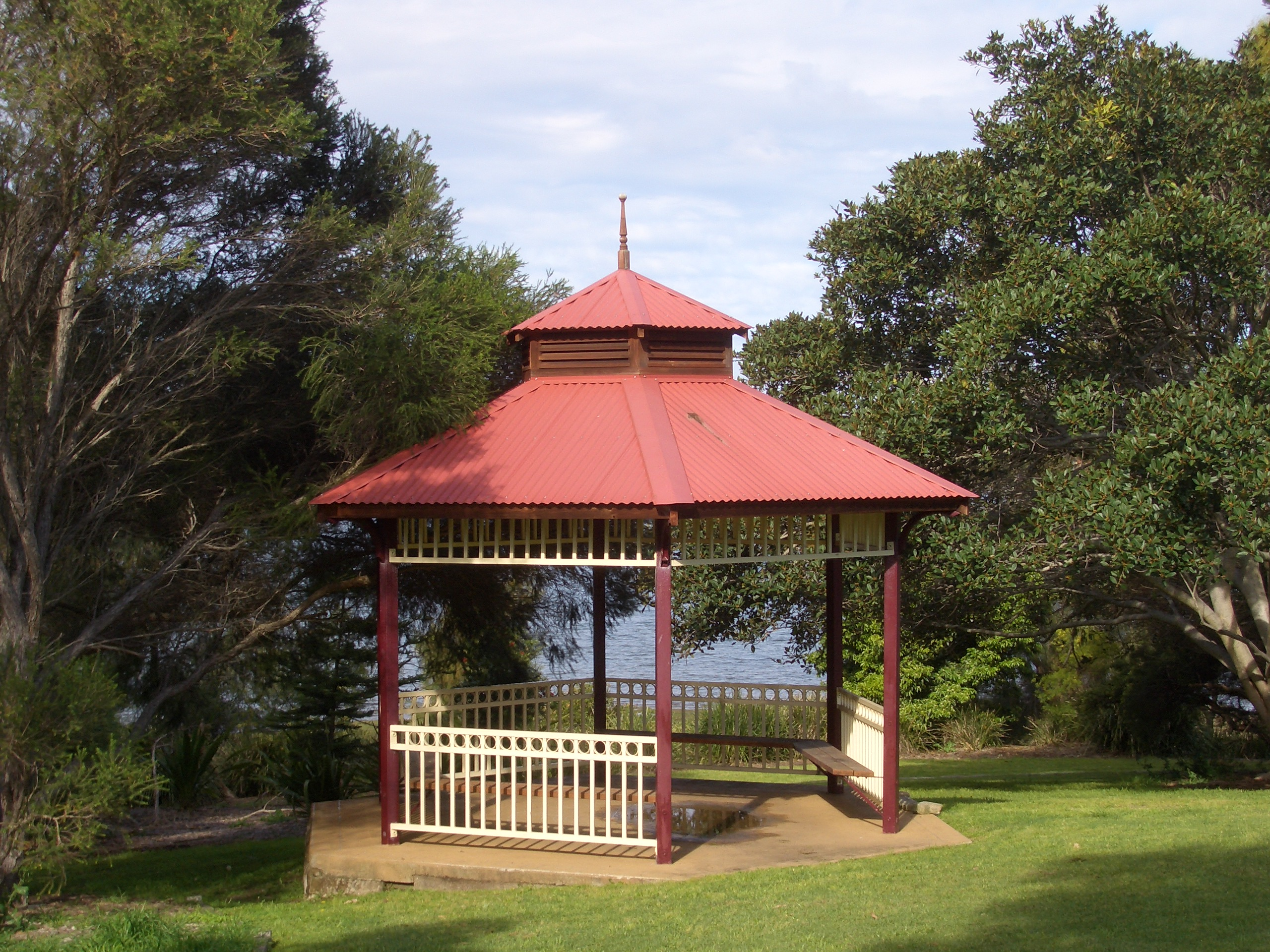
Prince Edward Park

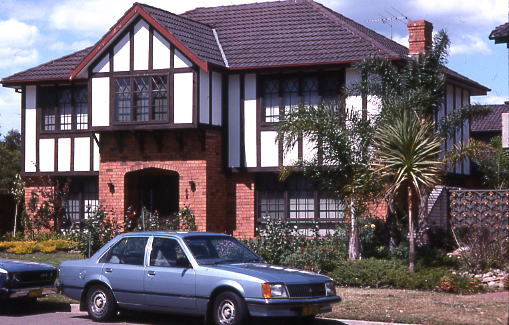
Home in Tudor style
