= Breakfast Point =

- Suburb
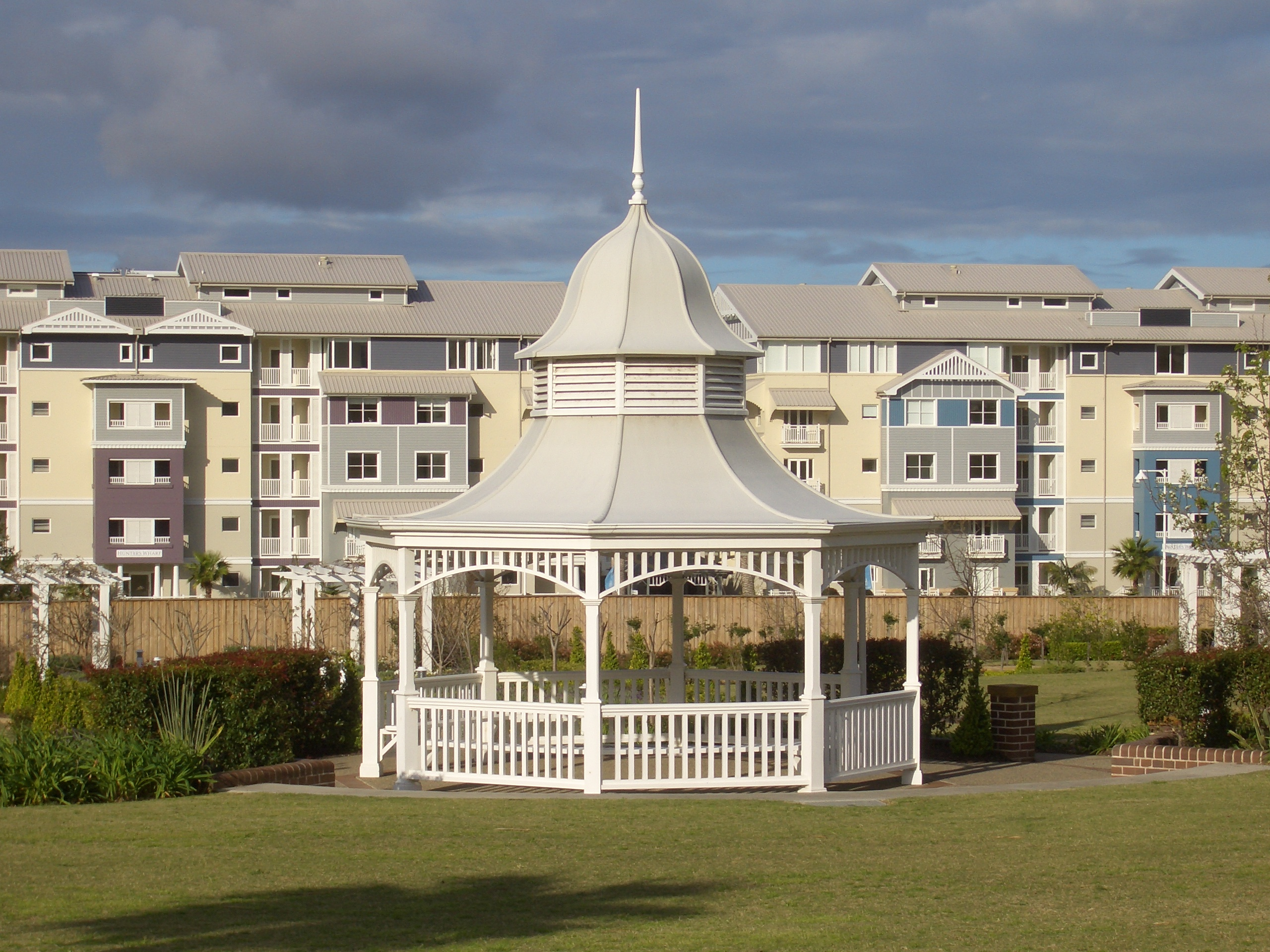
- Park at Breakfast Point

- Interactive map of Breakfast Point
- Country: Australia
- State: New South Wales
- City: Sydney
- LGA: City of Canada Bay
- Location: 16 km (9.9 mi) west of Sydney CBD
- Established: 16 April 1993

Government
  - State electorate: Drummoyne
  - Federal division: Reid

Area
  - Total: 0.5 km^{2} (0.19 sq mi)
- Elevation: 20 m (66 ft)

Population
  - Total: 4,678 (2021 census)
  - Density: 9,400/km^{2} (24,200/sq mi)
- Postcode: 2137
Suburbs around Breakfast Point
Putney	Tennyson Point	Gladesville
Mortlake	Breakfast Point	Cabarita
Concord	Concord	Cabarita

Breakfast Point is a suburb in the Inner West of Sydney, in the state of New South Wales, Australia. Breakfast Point is located 16 kilometres west of the Sydney central business district. It is in the local government area of the City of Canada Bay. People from Breakfast Point are colloquially called Breakfast Pointers.

== History ==
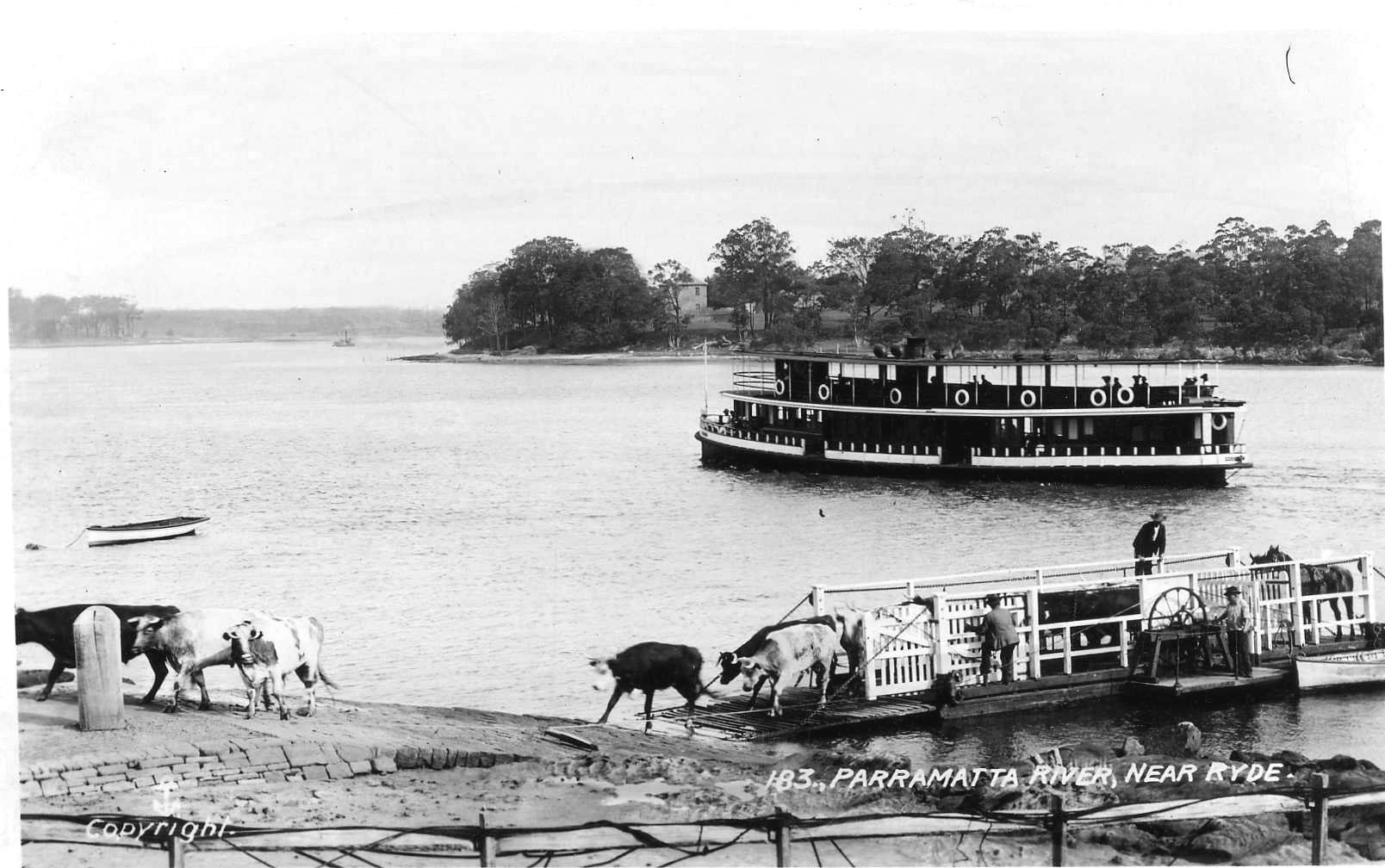
Breakfast Point in the 1900s (background), with the northern approach of the Mortlake Punt in the foreground.

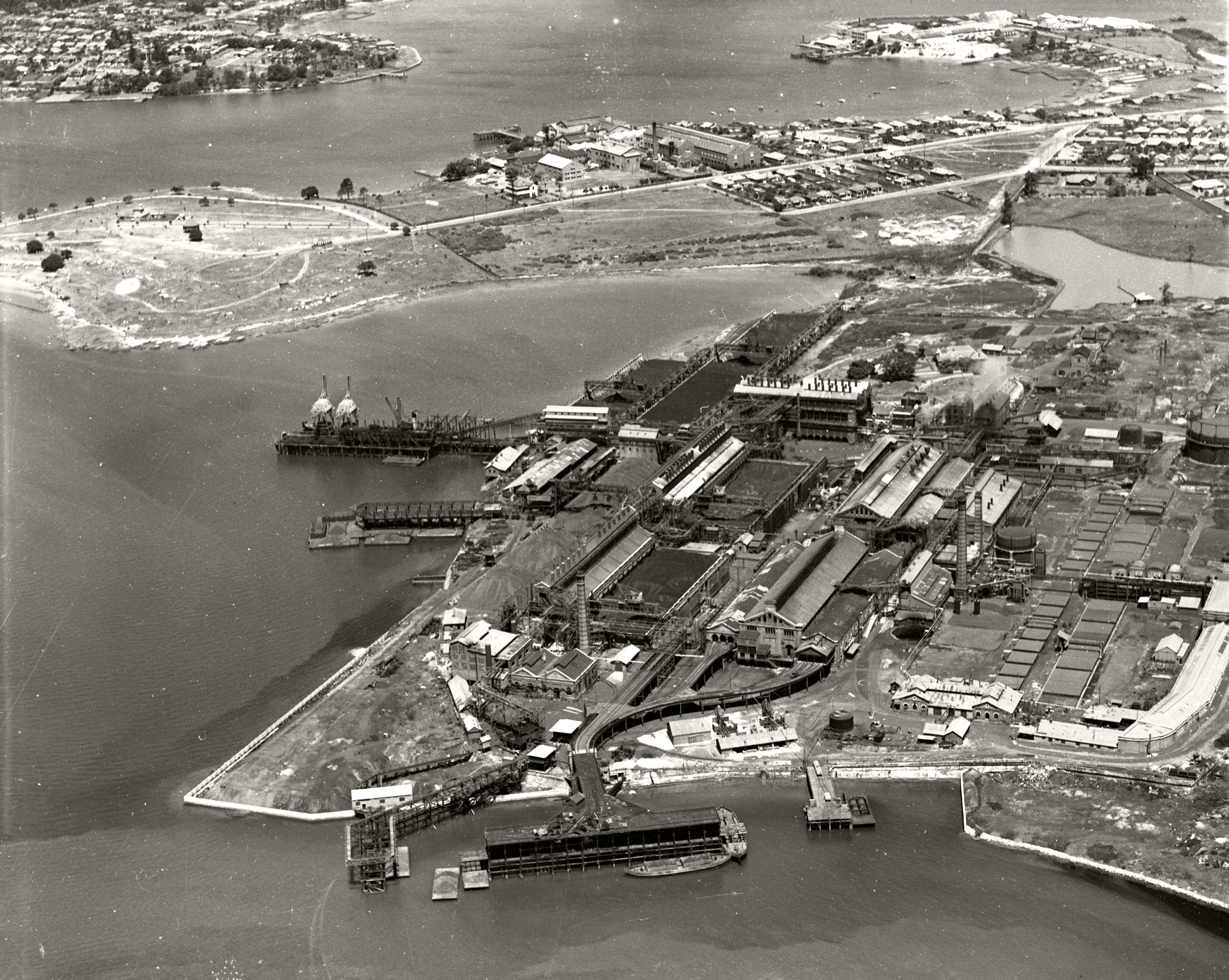
Mortlake Gas Works in 1937 (Breakfast Point, the geographical headland, is at lower left), and Cabarita in the background.

The area now occupied by Breakfast Point was previously part of Mortlake. The suburb is named after a geographical headland, named "Breakfast Point", to the east of Mortlake Point and to the west of Cabarita, and the suburb name was gazetted in 1993.

Flag formerly flown on the flagpole along the Parramatta River, a modified version is still used by the Breakfast Point Country Club.

According to historical records, the name of the point - and therefore the suburb name - is derived from the first contact between Europeans and the traditional owners of the land, the Wangal Clan. The encounter took place on 5 February 1788 during Captain John Hunter's exploration of the Parramatta River, while Hunter was having breakfast. William Bradley, First Lieutenant on board HMS Sirius, recorded the following entry in the log:

We landed to cook breakfast on the opposite shore to them (Breakfast Pt.). We made signs to them to come over and waved green boughs. Soon after which 7 of them came over in 2 canoes and landed near our boats. They left their spears in the canoes and came to us. We tied beads etc. about them and left them our fire to dress their mussels which they went about as soon as our boats put off.

Hunter, who was later to become Governor of New South Wales, is also remembered in the name of the nearby suburb of Hunters Hill.

Much of the area at Breakfast Point was occupied by the Mortlake Gas Works of the Australian Gaslight Company (AGL). AGL began developing the site from 1883. The Mortlake Gasworks site offered river access for colliers—known as 'sixty milers'—to bring coal and virtually unlimited space for expansion. The gas works remained in operation until the 1990s when in 1998 AGL, after a selected tender process, selected Rosecorp Pty. Ltd. to progressively acquire and develop the Mortlake site. Redevelopment has proceeded since then.

Breakfast Point is the location of one of the largest urban renewal projects in Sydney on a site formerly belonging to AGL. The New South Wales State Government took control of the approval process for the development from Canada Bay Council in August 2005, citing lengthy delays. Issues that arose between the council and the developer, Rosecorp, included the provision of public transport, public access to the area and its landscaping.

== Demographics ==
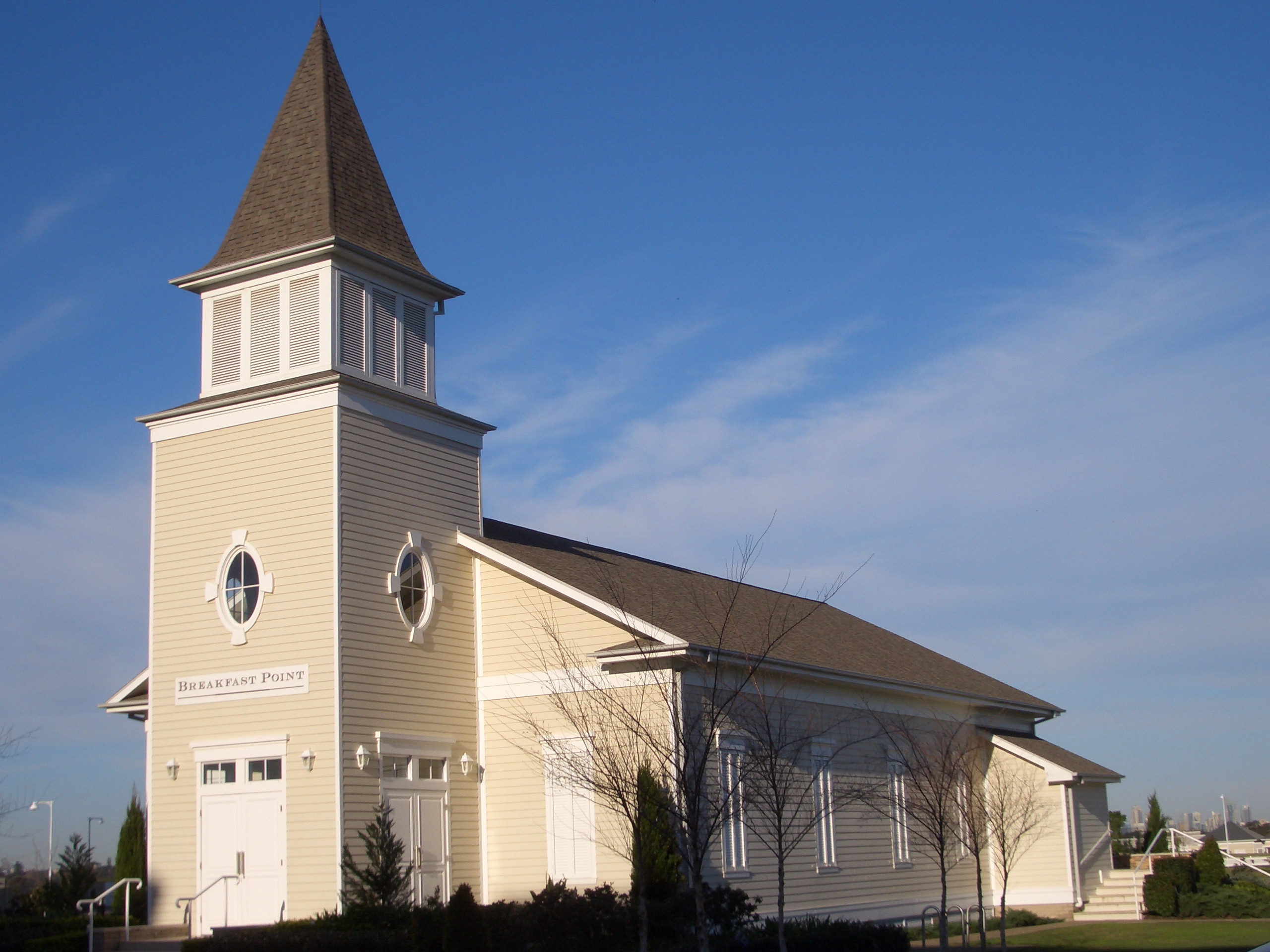
Breakfast Point Community Hall

According to the 2021 census of population, there were 4,678 residents in Breakfast Point. 55.2% of people were born in Australia. The next most common countries of birth were China 9.7%, England 3.8% and South Korea 2.7%. The most common ancestries in Breakfast Point were English 23.5%, Chinese 18.0%, Australian 17.0%, Italian 10.6% and Irish 9.6%. 59.7% of people spoke only English at home. Other languages spoken at home included Mandarin 10.8%, Cantonese 4.2%, Italian 3.4% and Korean 3.1%. The most common responses for religion were Catholic 31.6%, No Religion 31.1% and Anglican 10.2%.

== Commercial area ==
Breakfast Point also has a little town centre with IGA supermarket, Cafe Breakfast Point restaurant, Il Punto Pizzeria, two clothing shops, a hairdressers, day spa and one dental surgery at Canada Bay Dental. Further developments are planned. These developments are located opposite the historic Palace Hotel in Tennyson Road.

== Transport ==
Government Buses, Bridj buses, Ferry, Uber, Taxis and Water Taxis all service Breakfast Point.

The main bus routes are:
464 via Tennyson Road to Ashfield via Burwood
502 via Cabarita Road to City via Central Concord, Five Dock and Drummoyne
466 from Cabarita to Burwood
410 from Central Concord to Marsfield via Concord Hospital, Rhodes Macquarie Centre
410 from Central Concord to Hurstville via Campsie and Bexley
458 from North Strathfield or Concord Hospital to Rhodes Shopping Centre or Ryde Shopping Centre
458 from North Strathfield or Concord Hospital to Burwood via Strathfield.

Bridj buses service the area including Rhodes shops, Concord Hospital, Burwood and Strathfeild train stations, Sydney Olympic Park and at some times on weekdays Five Dock.

The ferry services generally go east via Barrangaroo to Circular Quay, although some peak services go via Blues Point and Milsons Point. Going west, ferries go to Parramatta (subject to tide. otherwise the journey will be completed by bus) via Olympic Park and other stops.

== Housing ==
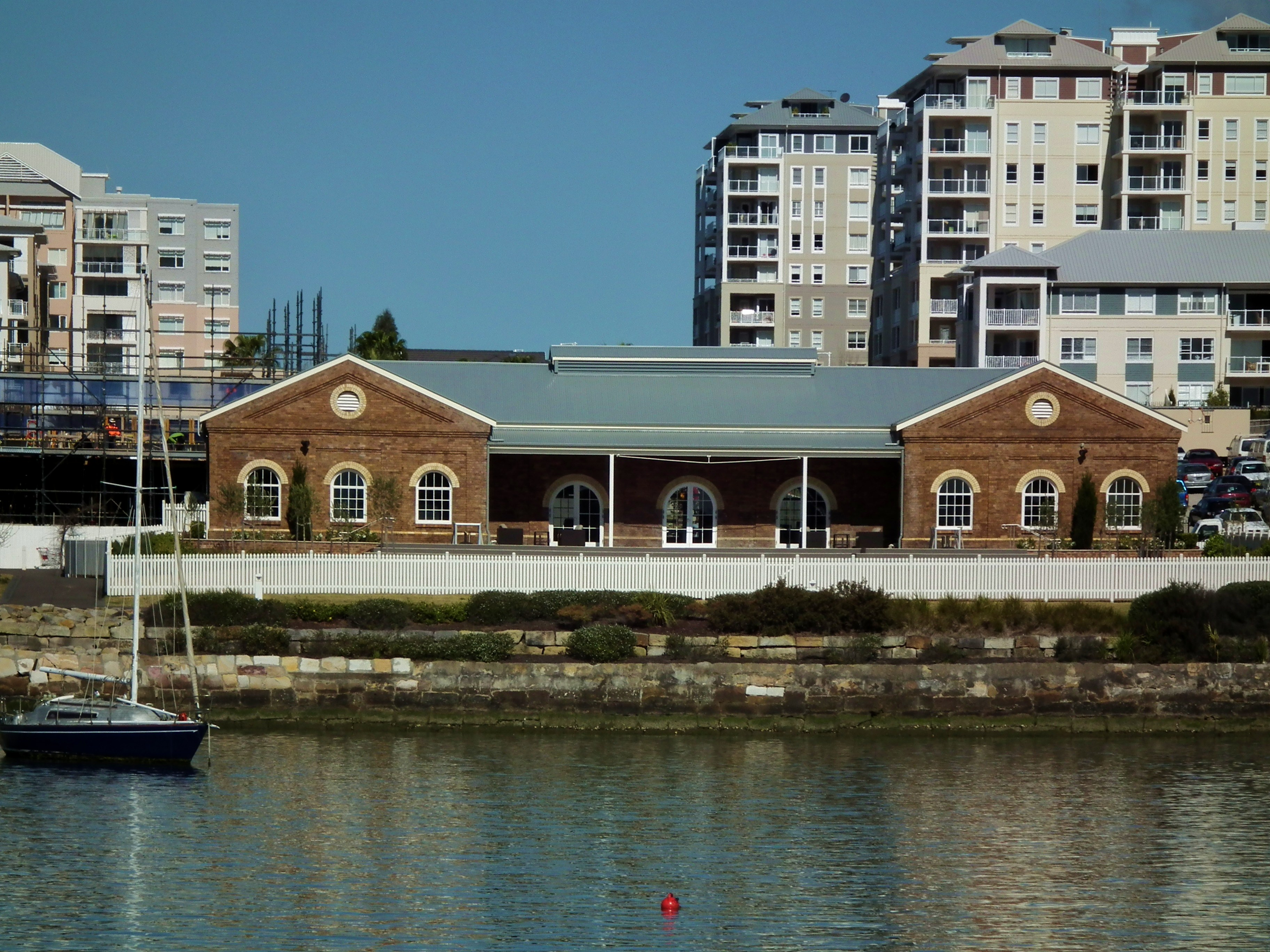
A former blacksmith's workshop, surrounded by residential apartments

There are several streets with architecturally designed modern houses and many modern apartment blocks in the suburb, such as Hunter's Wharf on the Parramatta River.
