= Russell Lea =

- Suburb
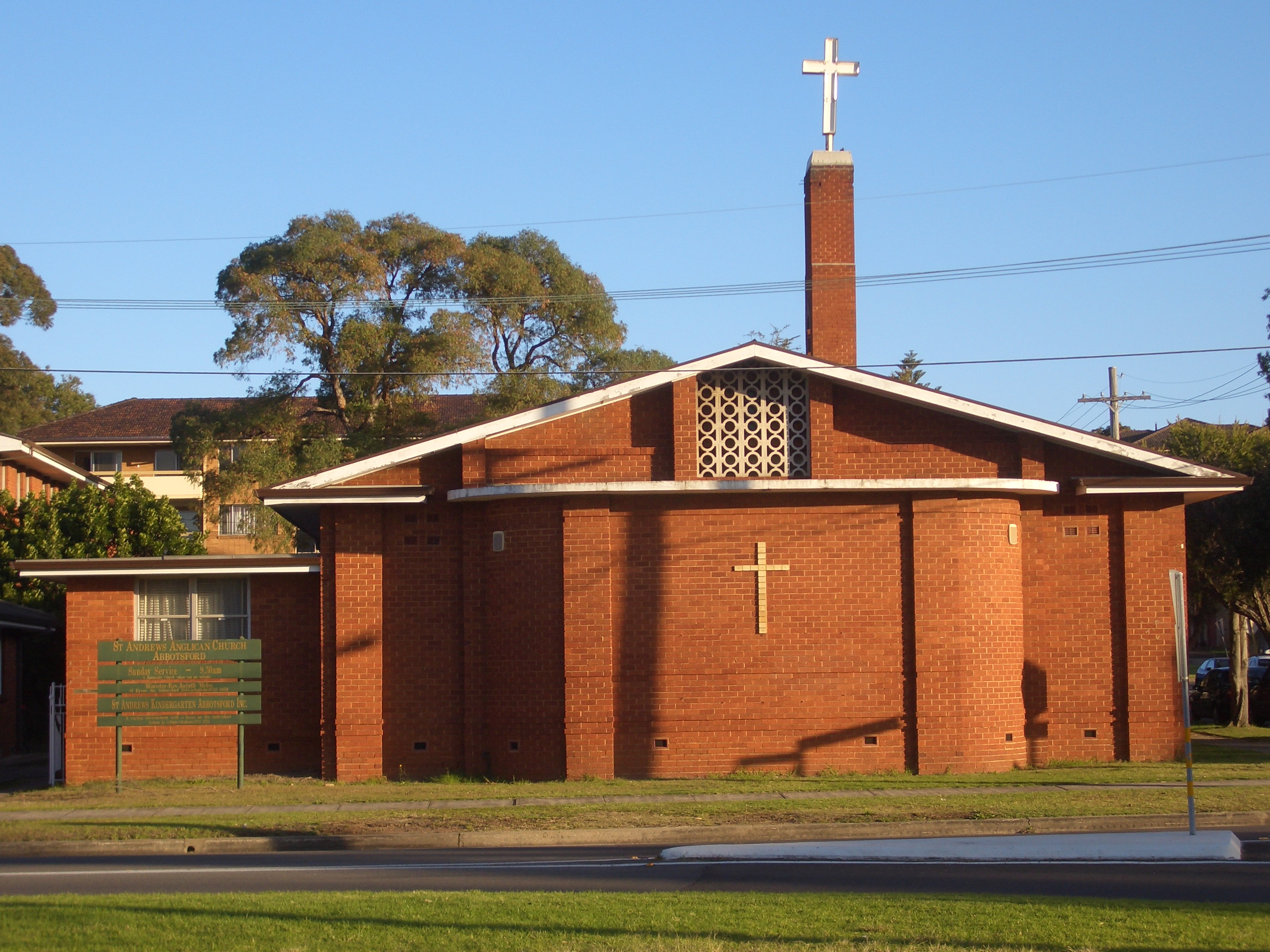
- St Andrews Anglican Church

- Interactive map of Russell Lea
- Coordinates: 33.858°S 151.141°E
- Country: Australia
- State: New South Wales
- City: Sydney
- LGA: City of Canada Bay
- Location: 8 km (5.0 mi) west of Sydney CBD

Government
  - State electorate: Drummoyne
  - Federal division: Reid
- Elevation: 20 m (66 ft)

Population
  - Total: 4,920 (2021 census)
- Postcode: 2046
Suburbs around Russell Lea
Abbotsford	Chiswick	Drummoyne
Wareemba	Russell Lea	Rodd Point
Five Dock	Five Dock	Haberfield

Russell Lea is a small suburb in the inner-west of Sydney, in the state of New South Wales, Australia. Russell Lea is located 8 kilometres west of the Sydney central business district in the local government area of the City of Canada Bay.

Russell Lea sits on the western shore of Iron Cove, on the Parramatta River. It is a quiet tree-lined suburb with large waterfront homes as well as more traditional federation homes.

== History ==
Russell Lea takes its name from one of its original settlers, Russell Barton, who was a pastoralist, mine owner and politician. He developed the "Russell Lea Estate" on a 24-hectare (60-acre) grant.

Russell Lea was once encompassed in the Five Dock Farm estate of surgeon John Harris. In 1790 this outspoken Irishman arrived in the infant colony, for which he displayed an instant dislike. However his rapid acquisition of Crown land may have served to change his tune. After being appointed court magistrate in 1794, Harris received 45 ha (110 acres) in the Parramatta region which now bears the name Harris Park. Subsequent to this he received land at Ultimo and South Creek, earning him the distinction of being one of the principal landholders in New South Wales.

It was in 1806 that Harris added Five Dock Farm to his holdings. All land between Iron Cove and Hen and Chicken Bay, totalling some 600 ha (1,500 acres), was granted to Harris from the Crown. Harris was called to London for the trial of Governor William Bligh soon after. Siding with the rebellious New South Wales Corps, Harris found it necessary to resign his military post. At age 60 he returned to Sydney, accompanied by his 24-year-old bride Eliza.

Two years prior to the surgeon's death in 1838, Harris sold Five Dock Farm to the prominent Sydney auctioneer Mr Samuel Lyons. Although a modest residence stood on Harris' land, it appears he preferred to reside at his Ultimo Place mansion or Shanes Park, South Creek. It was at the latter that the surgeon died in 1838. Aged 84, the widowed Harris had achieved a prominent public profile, leaving an estate worth an estimated 150,000 pounds. Samuel Lyons proceeded to subdivide Five Dock Farm into substantial 12 to 24 ha (30 to 60 acres) estates. This made way for the grand mansions, some of which spawned suburbs of their own. These included Drummoyne House, Abbotsford, and Barton Russell's grand residence Russell Lea.

Russell Barton was born in Penge near London in 1830. As a young man he accompanied his family to the colony, settling a station in the then remote state of South Australia. In 1855 he married Miss J. M. Davie, and within a decade acquired two stations on the Barwon River. Barton could turn his hand to any task. In addition to stock handling, farming, horse breaking and shepherding, Barton proved himself adequate as a butcher, blacksmith, builder, carpenter, contractor and stonemason. In 1874 he invested in the Cobar mine, eventually rising to serve as its managing director. Displaying much skill in this industry, Barton was soon elected to no less than 11 mining company boards. From 1880 to 1886 Barton served as parliamentary member for Bourke. It was during this time he erected the imposing Victorian Italianate mansion Russell Lea, whose estate occupied the suburb which bears its name.

Transportation improvements in the late nineteenth century occasioned residential development in the Drummoyne municipality. By 1874 a regular horse-drawn omnibus serviced the local residents, and in 1881 the original Gladesville Bridge was completed. Not only did this connect the Drummoyne region with the inner Sydney suburbs, it served as the sole roadway between Port Jackson and the lower Parramatta River environs until the opening of the Sydney Harbour Bridge in 1932. The Gladesville Bridge was followed closely by the Iron Cove Bridge, spanning Iron Cove in 1882. In 1890, a tramway was connected between Five Dock and Leichhardt. By 1902, when the local government bodies of Five Dock and Drummoyne were merged into the Borough of Drummoyne, the regional population stood at 2,800. Russell Barton's Russell Lea estate survived intact until 1913, when it was subdivided and auctioned by Hardie and Gorman.

== Landmarks ==
- Russell Lea Infants School is one of the oldest landmarks in the area.
- Campbell park, a large soccer field home to Abbotsford Juniors Football Club
- The main roads running through Russell Lea are Lyons Road and Hampden Road.

== Population ==
In the 2021 census, Russell Lea has a population of 4,920 persons, of whom 2,542 (51.7%) were female and 2,374 (48.3%) were male.
