= Canada Bay, New South Wales =

Suburb of Sydney, Australia

Canada Bay
- Suburb
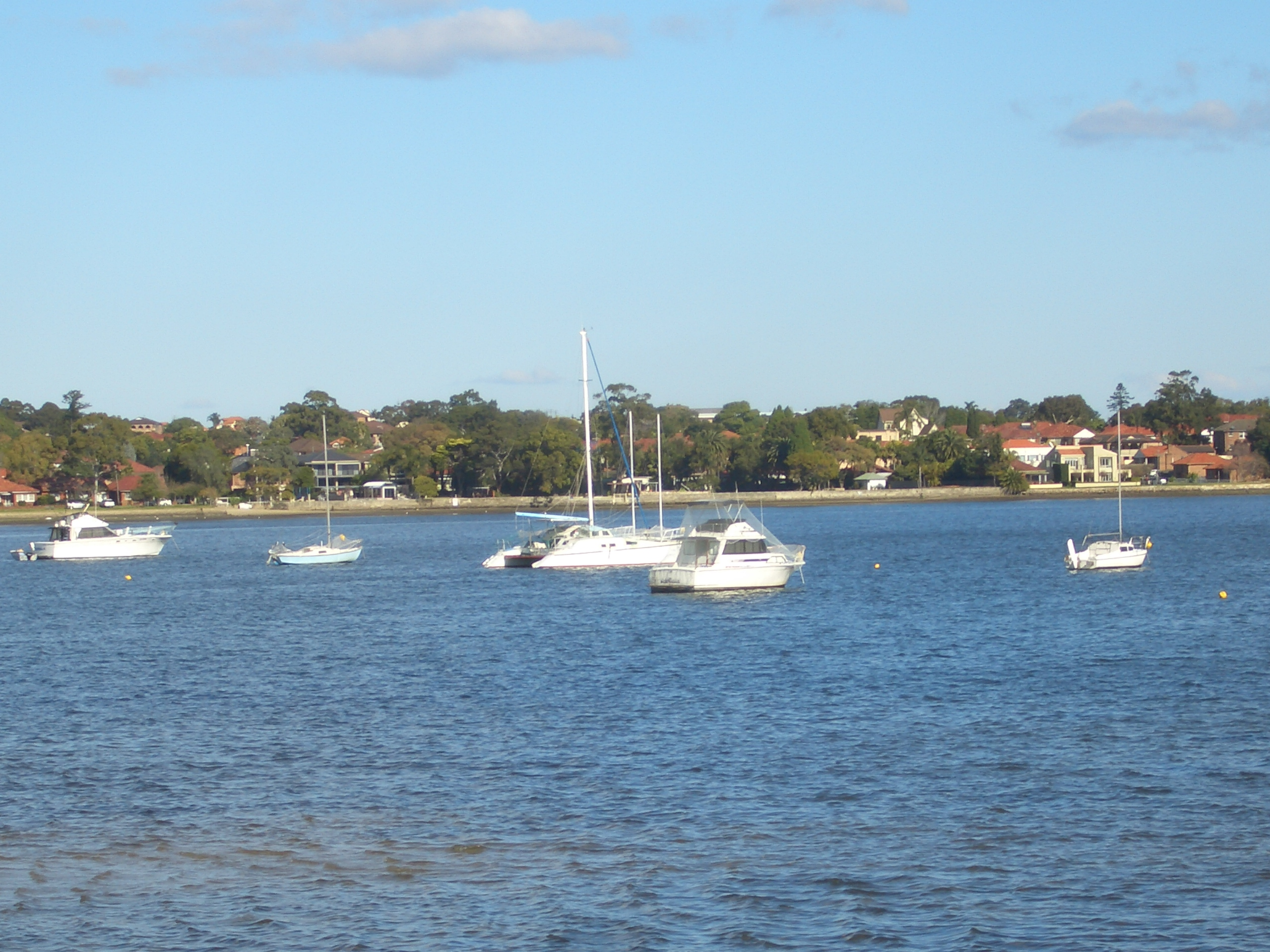
- Canada Bay

- Interactive map of Canada Bay
- Country: Australia
- State: New South Wales
- City: Sydney
- LGA: City of Canada Bay
- Location: 11 km (6.8 mi) west of Sydney CBD

Government
  - State electorate: Drummoyne
  - Federal division: Reid

Population
  - Total: 1,308 (SAL 2021)
- Postcode: 2046
Suburbs around Canada Bay
| Concord | | Five Dock |
| Concord | Canada Bay | Five Dock |
| Burwood | Croydon | Croydon |

Canada Bay is a suburb in the Inner West of Sydney, in the state of New South Wales, Australia. It is 11 kilometres (6.8 mi) west of the Sydney central business district, in the local government area of City of Canada Bay.

Canada Bay is also a bay on Parramatta River between Concord and Five Dock. The suburb of Canada Bay sits on the southern shore and is bordered by the suburbs of Burwood, Croydon and Five Dock. The City of Canada Bay takes its name from the bay but its administrative centre is located in the suburb of Drummoyne.

== History ==
The name Canada Bay honours a link between Australia and Canada. Following the Lower Canada Rebellion of 1837 to 1838, two Irish and 58 French Canadian rebels were deported to Australia. At the request of the local Catholic bishop, they were brought to Sydney. Imprisoned at Longbottom Stockade (which was located at what is now Concord Oval), the convicts broke stone for the construction of Parramatta Road and collected oyster shells for making lime. In 1842, the French Canadians were allowed to work outside the prison. Between 1843 and 1844, all received pardons and, except for two people who died and one (Joseph Marceau) who settled in Dapto, all returned to Canada.

After the rebellions, John Lambton, 1st Earl of Durham, Governor General and Lord High Commissioner to British North America recommended that Britain grant responsible self-government to the Union of Upper and Lower Canada. Many parts of Canada Bay are a reminder of this history: Exile Bay, France Bay, Durham Street, Marceau Drive, Polding Street and Gipps Street. Bayview Park has a plaque that honours the exiles and marks the point of disembarkation.

The City of Canada Bay was formed in December 2000 by the merger of Concord and Drummoyne councils.

== Demographics ==
According to the 2021 census, there were 1,308 residents in Canada Bay. 66.2% of people were born in Australia, the next most common countries of birth included Italy at 6.5%, China (excluding Special Administrative Regions and Taiwan) at 4.3%, England at 2.8%, New Zealand at 1.3%, and Vietnam at 1.1%. 64.5% of people spoke only English at home; other languages spoken at home included Italian at 11.2%, Mandarin at 4.7%, Cantonese at 3.4%, Greek at 2.1%, and Arabic at 1.7%. The most common responses for religion were Catholic 43.2%, No Religion, so described 27.3%, Anglican 7.1% and Eastern Orthodox 4.9%; a further 3.4% of respondents elected not to disclose their religion.

The median household income was $2,473 compared to the national average of $1,746.
