= Wareemba =

- Suburb
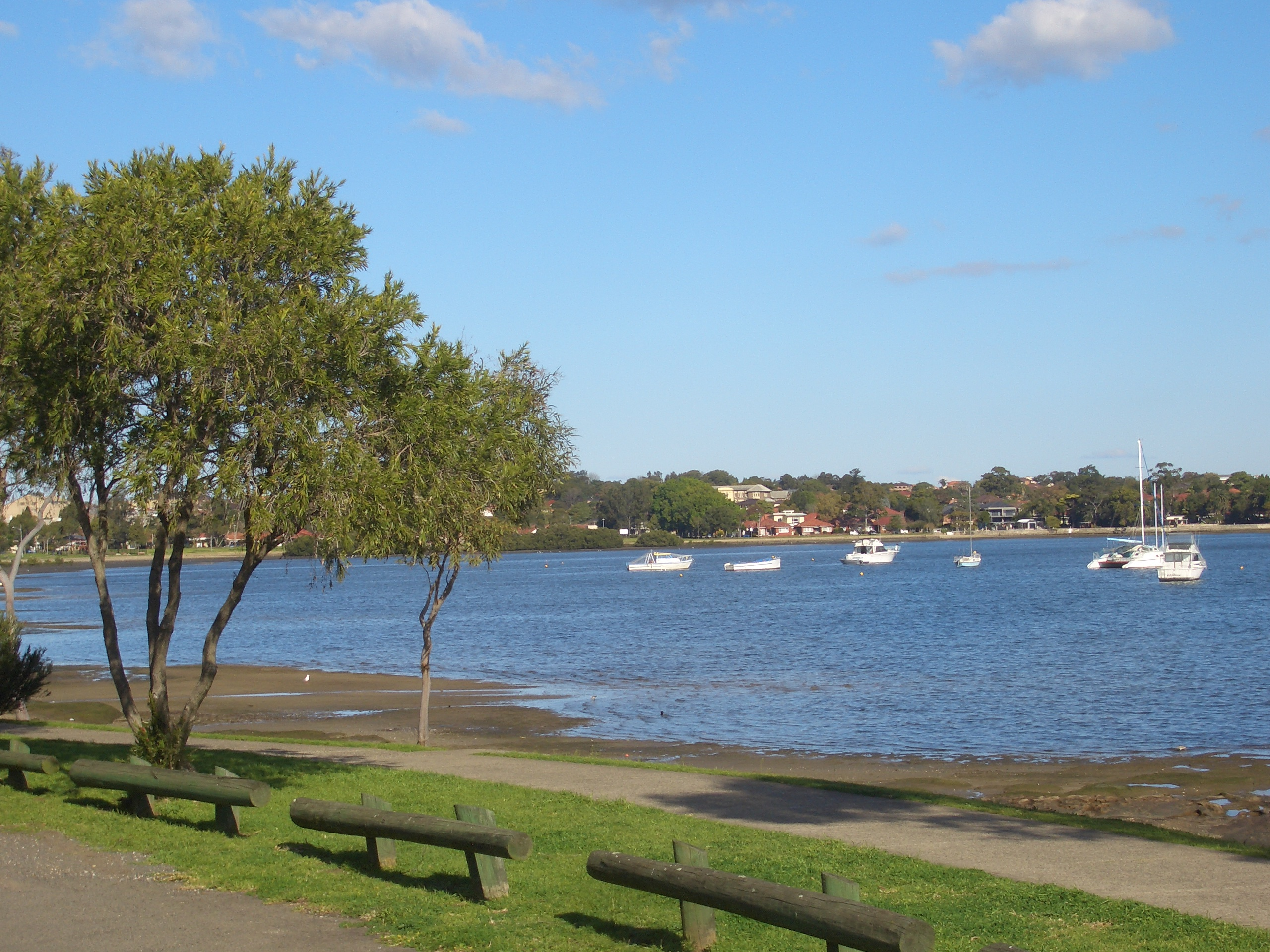
- Hen and Chicken Bay

- Interactive map of Wareemba
- Coordinates: 33°51′40″S 151°07′55″E
- Country: Australia
- State: New South Wales
- City: Sydney
- LGA: City of Canada Bay
- Location: 10 km (6.2 mi) from Sydney CBD

Government
  - State electorate: Drummoyne
  - Federal division: Reid

Area
  - Total: 0.3 km^{2} (0.12 sq mi)

Population
  - Total: 1,519 (2021 census)
  - Density: 5,100/km^{2} (13,100/sq mi)
- Postcode: 2046
Suburbs around Wareemba
Abbotsford	Abbotsford	Chiswick
Concord	Wareemba	Russell Lea
Five Dock	Five Dock	Russell Lea

Wareemba is a suburb in the Inner West of Sydney in the state of New South Wales, Australia. Wareemba is 12 kilometres west of the Sydney central business district in the local government area of the City of Canada Bay. Wareemba sits on the eastern shore of Hen and Chicken Bay, on the Parramatta River. It is almost the smallest suburb in Sydney by land area.

== History ==
European settlement of the area began in the 1830s, with land mainly used for farming. The suburb was originally part of neighbouring suburb Abbotsford until declared a separate suburb in 1993. The name Wareemba comes from an Aboriginal word meaning "place where sweet water meets salt water".

== Commercial area ==
Wareemba has a small group of shops located on Great North Road. Wareemba is known for its coffee shops, including one business that combines fruit shop with coffee shop. Wareemba also has an IGA supermarket.

== Churches ==
Wareemba Gospel Hall is in Coranto Street.

== Population ==
The suburb of Wareemba had a population of 1,519 people, according to the 2021 Census of Population and Housing.

=== Demographics ===
Like the nearby suburbs of Haberfield and Five Dock, Wareemba has a large population of residents with Italian ancestry (31.7%).

68.1% of people were born in Australia with the next most common countries of birth being Italy (9.3%), England (2.4%), China (1.7%), New Zealand (1.5%) and Greece (1.0%). 68.6% of people only spoke English at home. Other languages spoken at home included Italian at 16.4%. The most common responses for religion were Catholic (48.7%), no religion (24.4%), Anglican (7.7%) and Eastern Orthodox (5.5%). 3.8% of the population chose not to state their religion.
