= Abbotsford, New South Wales =

Abbotsford
- Suburb
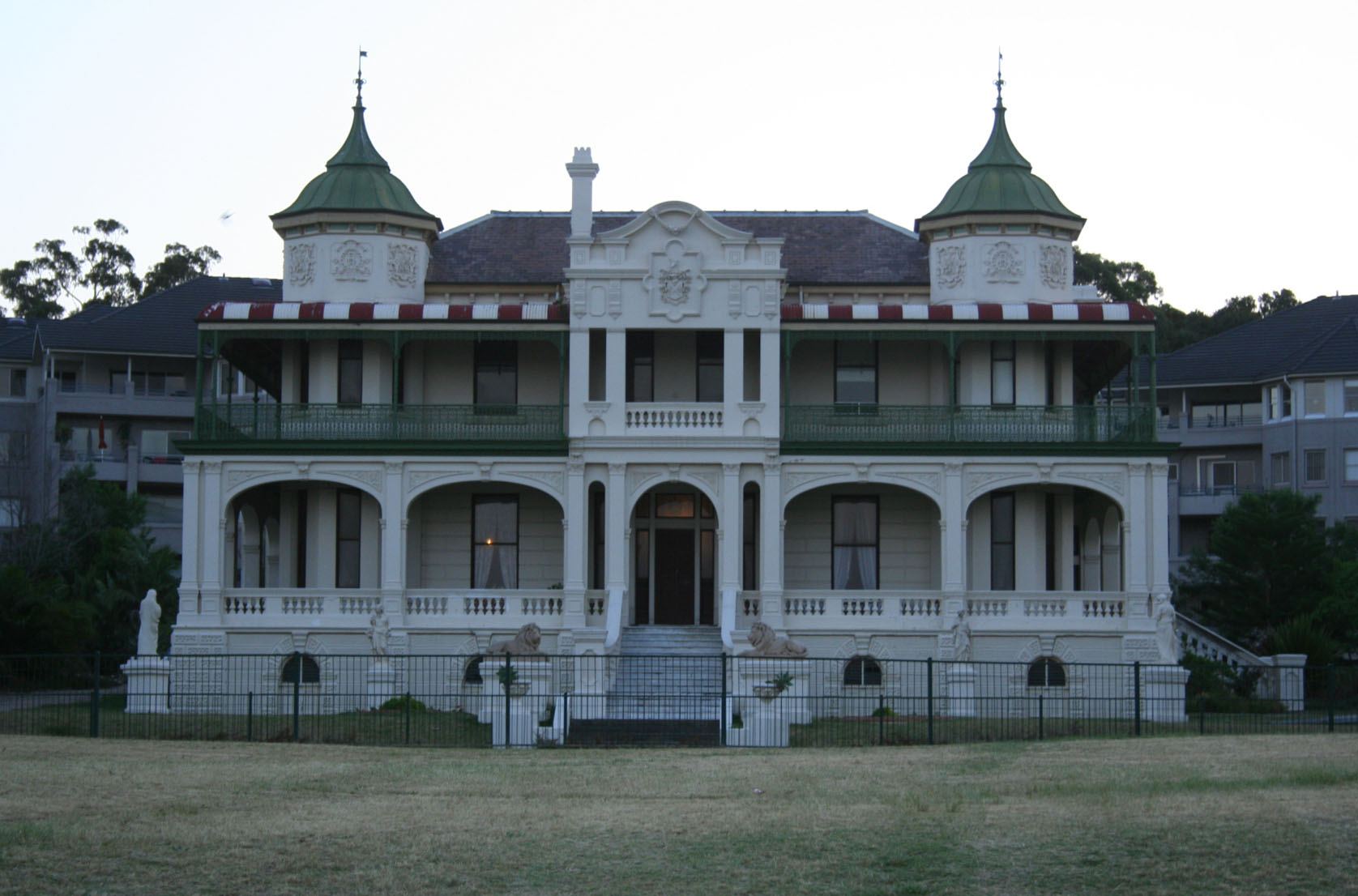
- Abbotsford House

- Interactive map of Abbotsford
- Coordinates: 33°51′08″S 151°07′38″E
- Country: Australia
- State: New South Wales
- City: Sydney
- LGA: City of Canada Bay
- Location: 10 km (6.2 mi) from Sydney CBD

Government
  - State electorate: Drummoyne
  - Federal division: Reid

Area
  - Total: 1 km^{2} (0.39 sq mi)
- Elevation: 22 m (72 ft)

Population
  - Total: 5,431 (SAL 2021)
- Postcode: 2046
Suburbs around Abbotsford
Gladesville	Gladesville	Henley
Cabarita	Abbotsford	Drummoyne
Five Dock	Wareemba	Russell Lea

Abbotsford is a suburb in the Inner West of Sydney, in the state of New South Wales, Australia. Abbotsford is 10 kilometres west of the Sydney central business district in the local government area of the City of Canada Bay. Abbotsford sits on the peninsula between Abbotsford Bay and Hen and Chicken Bay, on the Parramatta River.

== History ==
Abbotsford took its name from Abbotsford House, owned by Sir Arthur Renwick. He named his property after Abbotsford House in Scotland, the residence of historical novelist and poet, Sir Walter Scott.

=== Aboriginal culture ===
Abbotsford was first known by its Aboriginal name Bigi Bigi. The traditional owners are the Wangal clan of the Eora Nation.

=== European settlement ===
The suburb was originally part of Five Dock Farm and when subdivided in 1837, was called Feltham. Sir Arthur Renwick, a doctor, philanthropist and politician built his home here in 1890 and called it Abbotsford House in honour of Sir Walter Scott's home. Renwick sold his property in 1903 to Albert Grace, and in 1918 it became the site of a Nestlé chocolate factory, with the house used initially for chocolate production and later as their administrative offices. The factory was closed in 1991, after which the area was redeveloped as the medium-density Abbotsford Cove housing complex.

Australian poet Henry Lawson did not die in Abbotsford house in 1922, as is sometimes claimed, but at the home of Mrs Isabella Byers at 437 Great North Road, recently demolished. Abbotsford House is now listed on the Register of the National Estate.

== Demographics ==
According to the 2021 census of the population, there were 5,431 residents in Abbotsford. 66.3% of people were born in Australia. The most common countries of birth were Italy 5.7%, England 3.2% and China 2.8%. 68.6% of people only spoke English at home. Other languages spoken at home included Italian 8.2%, Mandarin 2.9%, Cantonese 2.3% and Greek 1.8%. The most common responses for religious affiliation were Catholic 37.9%, No Religion 29.7% and Anglican 8.1%.

== Transport ==
Transit Systems bus route 438 operates from Abbotsford ferry wharf to Martin Place. Abbotsford ferry wharf is served by Parramatta River ferry services. Electric trams operated to Abbotsford until their replacement by buses in 1954.

== Commercial area ==
Abbotsford has a small group of shops on Great North Road.

== Education ==
Abbotsford Public School is a local primary school at 350 Great North Road.

== Landmarks ==
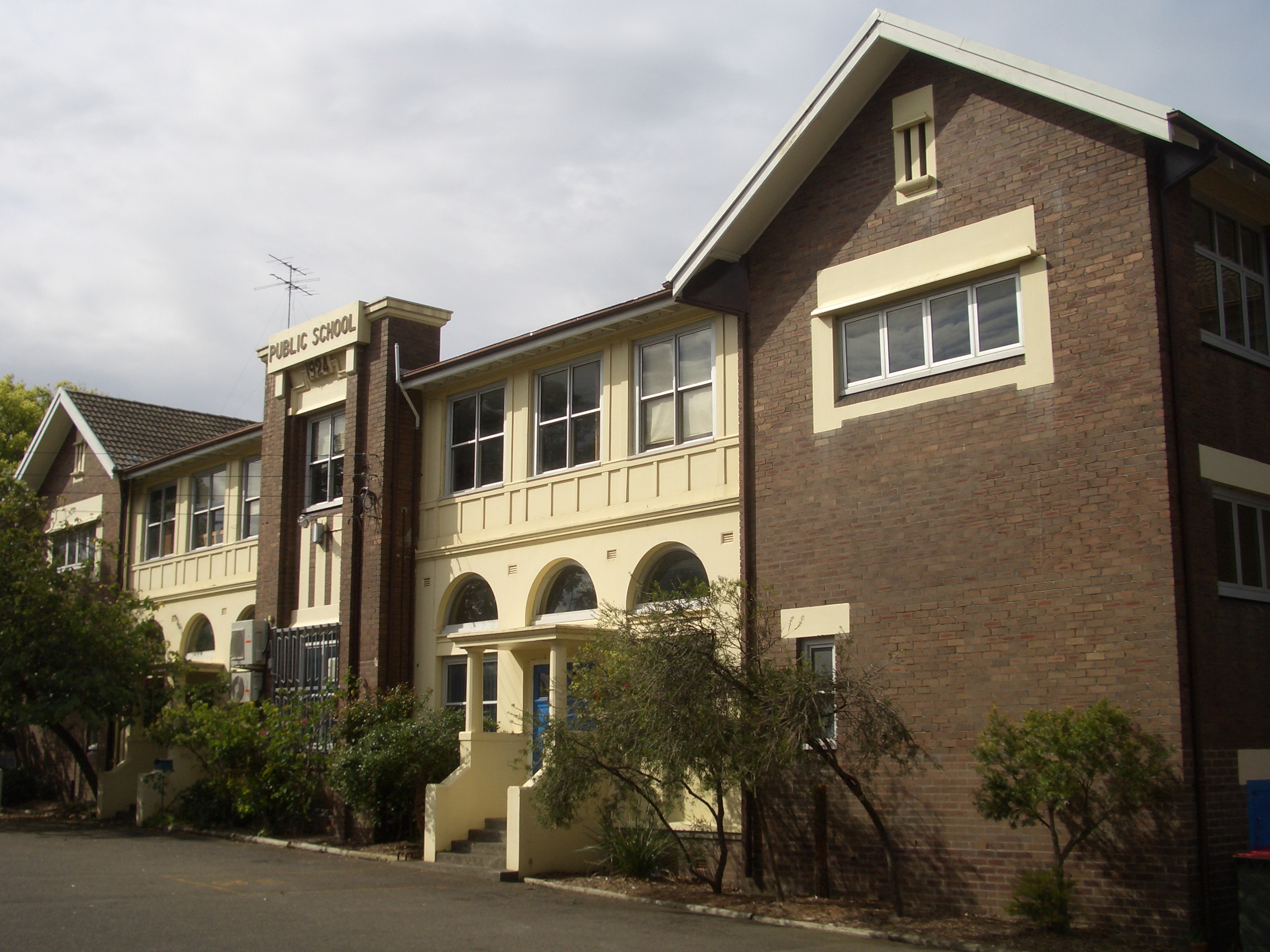
Abbotsford Public School

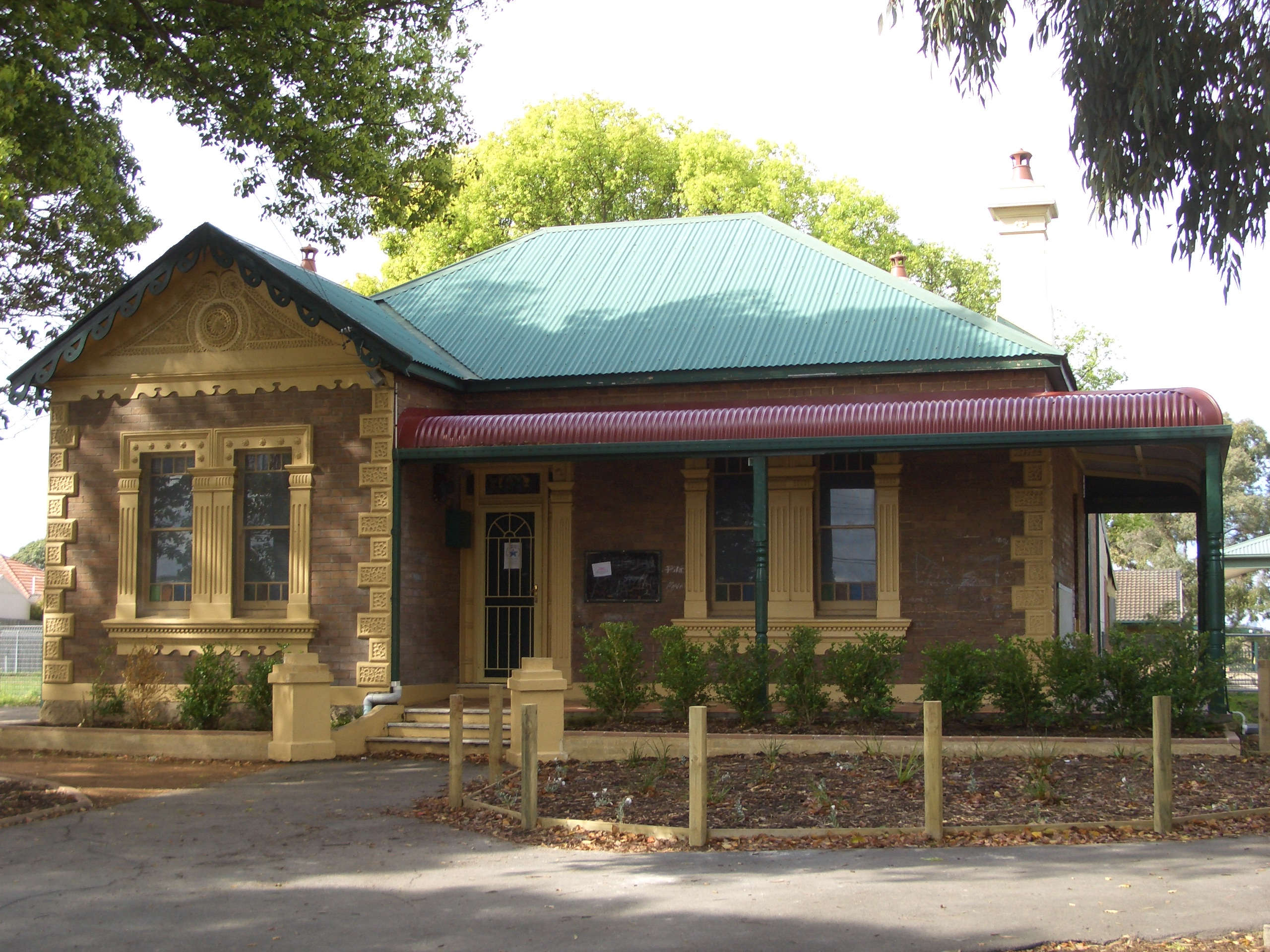
Victorian cottage used as Day Care Centre

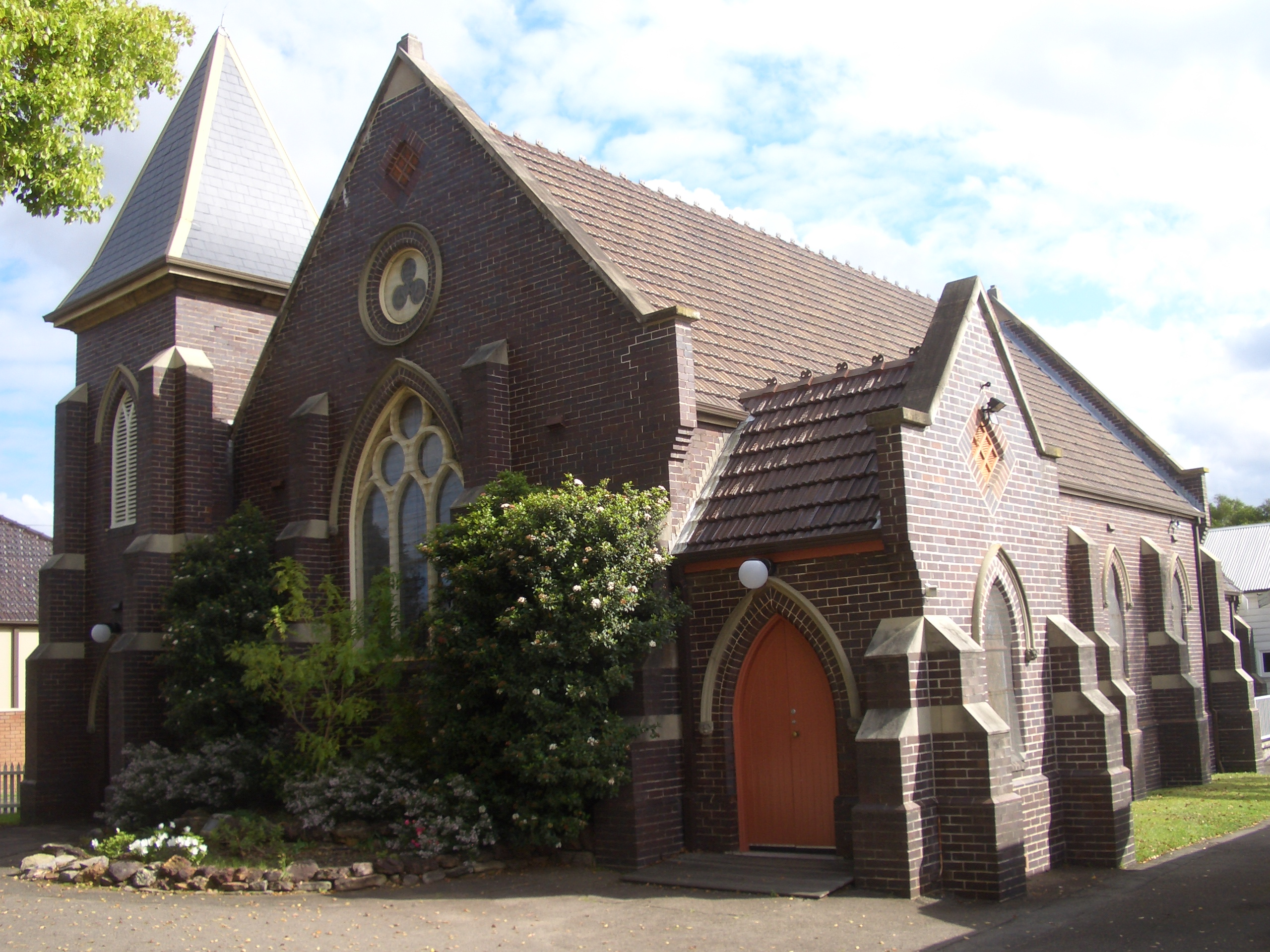
Abbotsford Presbyterian Church

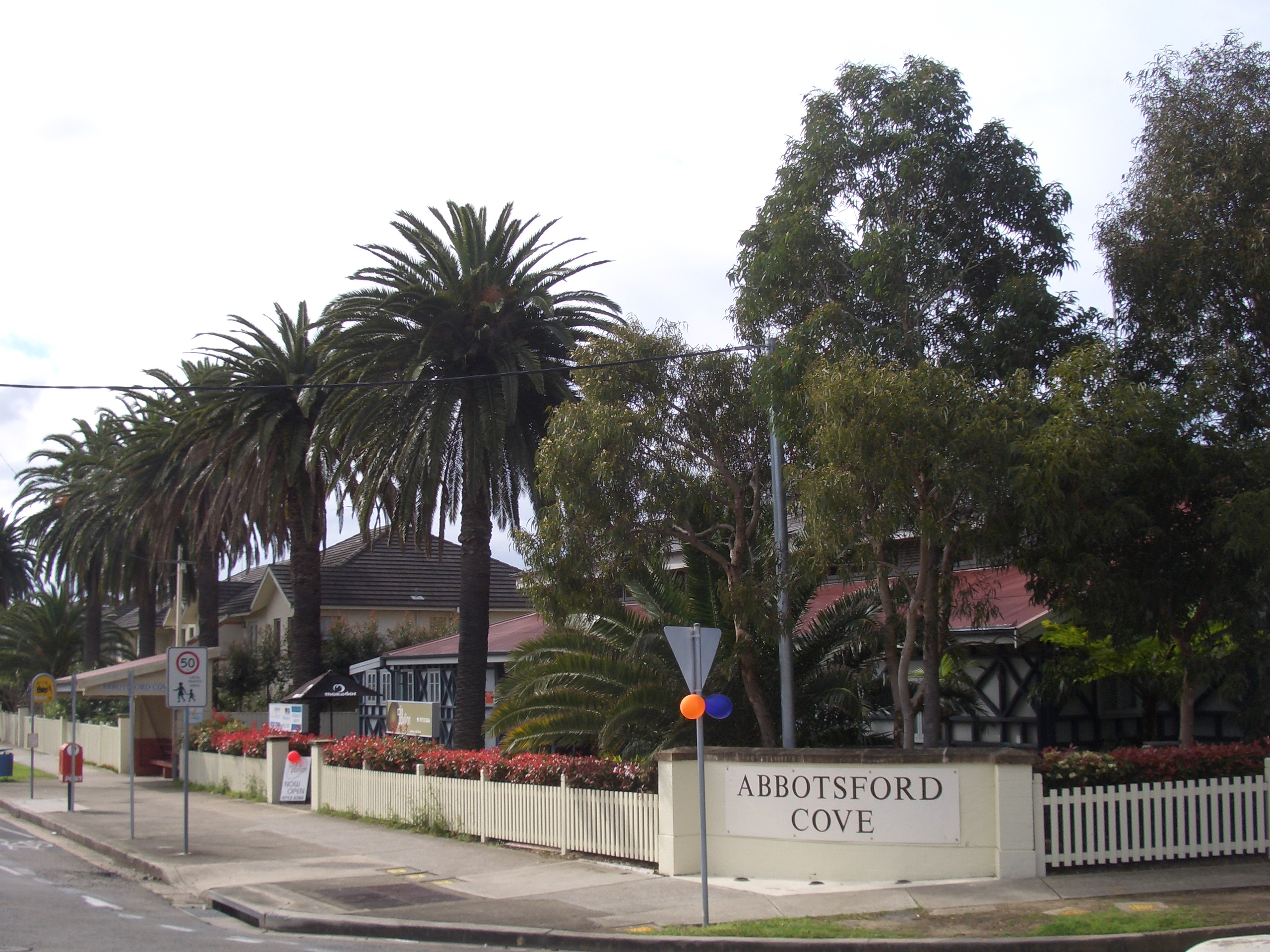
Abbotsford Cove

== Sport and recreation ==
Abbotsford Sailing Club and Sydney Rowing Club sit on the Parramatta River, at the end of Great North Road. Abbotsford houses the rowing sheds for Sydney Boys High School, Newington College and Abbotsford Rowing Club.

== Notable residents ==
- David Hicks
- Reg Latta
- Henry Lawson
- Lewy Pattinson
- Sir Arthur Renwick
- Julie Roberts(current mayor)and Chris Young(First Gentleman)
- Justin(deputy mayor) and Lana Bosilkovski
