= List of the 108 Lower Canadians prosecuted before the general court-martial of Montreal in 1838–39 =

Complete list of the 108 Lower Canadians prosecuted before the general court-martial of Montreal in 1838-1839. The trials occurred between December 6, 1838 and 1 May 1839, following the suspension of habeas corpus on November 8, 1838. Nine of the persons in custody were acquitted, and 99 sentenced to death. 12 patriots were hanged in public between December 1838 and February 1839. 58 of the 99 who were initially condemned to death saw their sentence commuted into deportation to Australia on September 27, 1839. (Pardoned in 1843, they returned home in 1845.) 29 were freed under bail or condition.

== The 58 deported to Australia ==
=== Saint-Clément ===
- Michel Alary - carpenter
- Désiré Bourbonnais - blacksmith
- Jacques Goyette - farmer and stone man
- Joseph Goyette - carpenter
- André Papineau dit Montigny - blacksmith
- François-Xavier Prévost - merchant and innkeeper
- Toussaint Rochon - teamster and painter
- Basile Roy - farmer
- Charles Roy dit Lapensée père - farmer
- Joseph Roy dit Lapensée, son of Louis - day labourer

=== L'Acadie ===
- Théodore Béchard - owner
- Antoine Coupal dit Lareine - farmer
- Etienne Langlois - farmer

=== Sainte-Martine ===
- Charles Bergevin dit Langevin, père - farmer
- Constant Buisson - blacksmith and bailiff
- Ignace-Gabriel Chèvrefils - farmer
- Joseph Dumouchel, - farmer - brother of Louis
- Louis Dumouchel - innkeeper and cultivator
- Jean Laberge - farmer and carpenter
- François-Xavier Touchette - farmer and blacksmith
- Louis Turcot - farmer

=== Napierville ===
- François Bigonesse dit Beaucaire - owner
- Louis Defaillette - farmer
- Jacques-David Hébert - farmer
- Joseph-Jacques Hébert - farmer
- Charles Huot - notary
- Pierre Lavoie - farmer
- David-Drossin Leblanc - farmer
- Hubert Drossin-Leblanc - farmer
- Joseph Marceau dit Petit-Jacques - farmer and cloth weaver
- Gabriel-Achille Morin - merchant (son of Pierre-Hector)
- Pierre-Hector Morin - ship captain
- Joseph Paré - farmer

=== Terrebonne ===
- Charles-Guillaume Bouc - clerk
- Edouard-Pascal Rochon - teamster and painter

=== Saint-Césaire ===
- Louis Bourdon - farmer and merchant
- Jean-Baptiste Bousquet - farmer and grain miller
- François Guertin - carpenter

=== Montréal ===
- Léandre Ducharme, clerk

=== Saint-Timothée ===
- David Gagnon - farmer and carpenter
- François-Xavier Prieur - merchant

=== Châteauguay ===
- Louis-Guérin Dussault - merchant and baker
- Joseph Guimond - farmer and carpenter
- François-Maurice Lepailleur - painter
- Samuel Newcomb - Médecin
- Jean-Louis Thibert - farmer
- Jean-Marie Thibert - farmer
- Jean-Baptiste Trudelle - farmer and carpenter

=== Saint-Rémi ===
- Hippolyte Lanctôt - notary
- Louis Pinsonnault - farmer

=== Saint-Constant ===
- Etienne Languedoc - farmer
- Moyse Longtin, fils de Jacques - farmer

=== Saint-Philippe ===
- Pascal Pinsonnault - farmer

=== Saint-Edouard ===
- René Pinsonnault - farmer
- Théophile Robert - farmer

=== Saint-Vincent-de-Paul ===
- Jérémie Rochon - machine operator

=== Alburg, Vermont ===
- Benjamin Mott - farmer

== The 26 released under bail ==
- François Camyré
- Antoine Charbonneau
- Joseph Cousineau
- David Demers
- Paul Gravelle
- Louis Héneault
- Louis Julien
- Joseph L'Écuyer
- Michel Longtin dit Jérôme, son
- Léon Leclaire
- Charles Mondat
- Clovis Patenaude
- Charles Rapin
- Antoine Roussin, alias Joseph
- Joseph Roy
- François St-Louis
- Thomas Surprenant, dit Lafontaine
- François Surprenant
- François Trepanier, son
- Édouard Tremblay
- Phillippe Tremblay
- François Vallé
- Bennoni Verdon
- Joseph Wattier dit Lanoie

== The 12 hanged ==
- December 21, 1838
  - Joseph-Narcisse Cardinal, lawyer and Member of Parliament
  - Joseph Duquet, notary
- January 18, 1839
  - Pierre-Théophile Decoigne, hotelman and notary
  - François-Xavier Hamelin, farmer
  - Joseph-Jacques Robert, farmer
  - Ambroise Sanguinet, farmer
  - Charles Sanguinet, farmer
- February 15, 1839
  - Amable Daunais, fermier
  - François-Marie-Thomas Chevalier de Lorimier, notary
  - Charles Hindelang, merchant and military officer
  - Pierre-Rémi Narbonne, painter and bailiff
  - François Nicolas, teacher

== The nine acquitted ==
- Jean-Baptiste Dozois, father
- Antoine Doré
- Louis Lesiege, aka Lesage
- Louis Lemelin
- Joseph Longtin
- James Perrigo
- Jacques Robert
- Édouard Therien
- Isidore Tremblay

== The three freed on condition ==
- Jean-Baptiste-Henri Brien (remain at a distance of 600 miles from the province)
- Antoine Côté (remain within the province)
- Guillaume Lévesque (leave the province)
