= Balmain Observer and Western Suburbs Advertiser =

Newspaper in New South Wales (1880–1984)

Balmain Observer and Western Suburbs Advertiser was a newspaper published in Balmain, New South Wales, Australia from 1880 to 1984.

== History ==
The paper began as The Balmain independent and Leichhardt observer in 1880. The proprietors included T. Preston, W.S. Ford & W.C. Macdougall. The newspaper's office was in Darling Street, Balmain and it was circulated in the Sydney suburbs of Balmain, Drummoyne, Leichhardt, Annandale, Sydney, Petersham, Summer Hill, Ashfield, Glebe, Ryde and Five Dock.

== Digitisation ==
This paper has been digitised as part of the Australian Newspapers Digitisation Program project of the National Library of Australia.

== See also ==
- List of newspapers in Australia
- List of newspapers in New South Wales
