= St Alban's, Five Dock =

- St Alban's Anglican Church
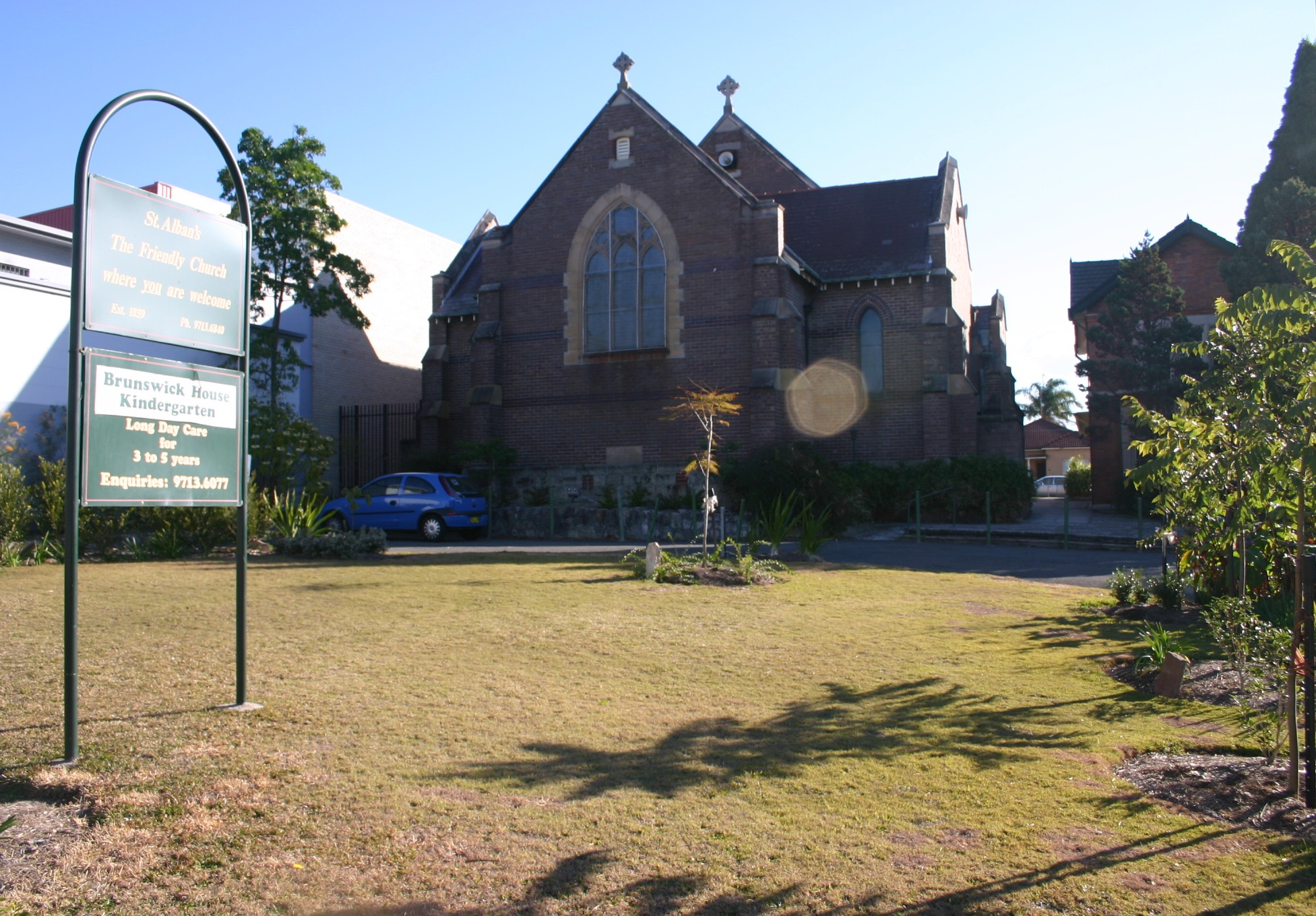
- Footpath view of the church building from Great North Road

- Location in Greater Sydney
- 33°52′01″S 151°07′46″E
- Location: 171 Great North Road, Five Dock, Sydney, New South Wales
- Country: Australia
- Denomination: Anglican Church of Australia
- Website: www.cciw.church/fivedock

History
- Status: Church
- Founder: Rev. Thomas H. Wilkinson

Architecture
- Functional status: Active
- Heritage designation: Local Government
- Architect: Thomas Rex
- Years built: 1858–1859

Administration
- Diocese: Sydney
- Archdeaconry: South Sydney Region
- Deanery: Christ Church Inner West

Clergy
- Rector: Andrew Katay (since 2008)

St Alban's Anglican Church is a heritage-listed and active Anglican church at 171 Great North Road, Five Dock in Sydney, New South Wales, Australia. The property spans back to the early days of British settlement in Australia. The site underwent multiple evolutions and renovations until it became originally included in St Phillip's Parish on 23 June 1802. The foundation stone of the church building was laid on 17 September 1858. The church building was intended to be divided into two parts, as a Parochial School and a Mission Church. The church's life and management relied heavily on the 'mother church' of the district, being St John's, Ashfield which was in close proximity to St Alban's and shared rectors over both sites.

The church itself holds not only the church building itself, but a heritage-listed rectory and a centre for both ministry needs and community events called the 'Ridley Centre'. The somewhat expansive property contributes to community events such as the 'Ferragosto' festival and the 'We Love Five Dock' which attracts a number of patrons.

It is a heritage-listed item in the Department of the Environment and Heritage's Australian Heritage database. Notable attributes that the church also possesses include the pipe organ (built by W. Davidson in 1891), the stained glass window collection and its interior carpentry.

In 2008, St Alban's became part of an amalgamation with three churches, St John's, Ashfield and St Oswald's, Haberfield comprising Christ Church Inner West (CCIW) Anglican Community contributing to the South Sydney Region of the Anglican Diocese of Sydney.

The church has had a total of 18 rectors. Dave Binggeli is the current curate since 2020, alongside the rector Rev Andrew Katay who has been rector of CCIW since 2008.

== History ==
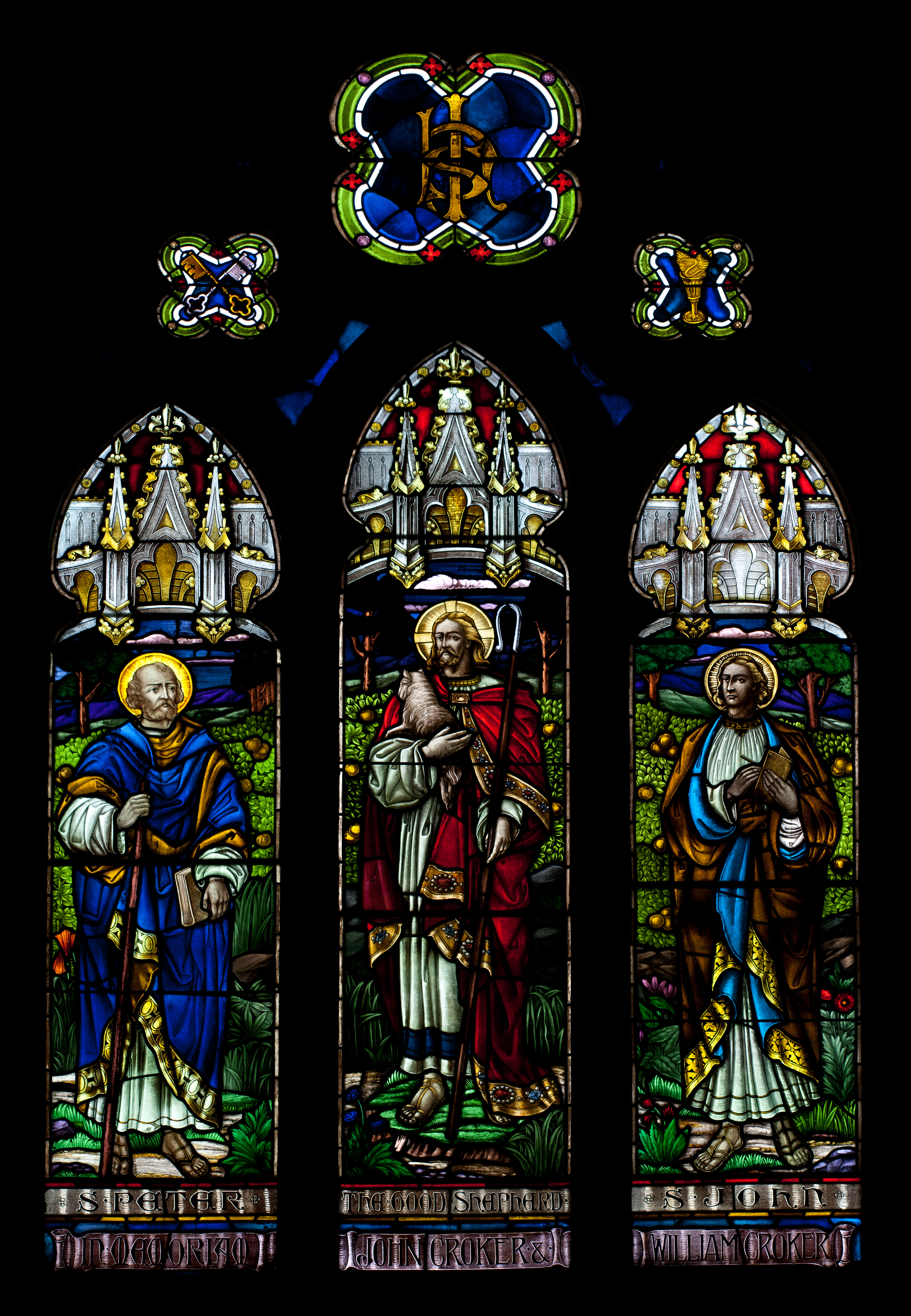
Central stained glass window depicting St Peter, Jesus as The Good Shepherd, and St John, at St Alban's Anglican Church, Five Dock, New South Wales, Australia. The inscription on this memorial window reads "In Memoriam John Croker & William Croker".

St Alban's history began during the time period in which British settlement took place in Australia. It progressed from farm land ownership up until 1828, when Joseph Nettleton, a former convict, leased the Five Dock estate. Ministry and site constructions was initially sluggish due to the lack of clergy in close proximity. The Rev. Richard Johnson, found a sense of indifference and lack of support and felt obligated to build the first church at his own expense. The church land was donated by Mr William Wright, a successful merchant born at Colchester, England in 1803.

=== Site development ===
Initial construction did not come to fruition, initially. Rev Joseph Kidd Walpole arrived in the colony in 1837. Due to there not being a physical church in the district, his task of ministering was made difficult. Two years beforehand, Elizabeth Underwood announced that she had reserved land 'for the building of an Episcopalian church', and the Lord Bishop of Australia announced its erection yet was never seen. Several years later, the foundation stone of the first Five Dock church was laid by the Right Rev. Dr Frederick Barker, the Bishop of Sydney, on 17 September 1858. The Sydney Morning Herald reported that: "Increased power and extended usefulness of the Anglican Church within the last four years are very noticeable. The zealous efforts of the Bishop of Sydney to place churches in neglected localities show a result highly favourable to his episcopate". The builder of the first church was Thomas Rex. The church building was intended to be both a Parochial School and also a Mission Church including residence for the current rector. The building measured fifteen metres by seven metres and was opened for worship by Bishop Barker on St Alban's Day 17 June 1859. Further additions to the church took place, increasing the size and features of the church with the consecration of chancel at the east end of the church, a font, a communion service and a reading desk. The church was named in honour of St Alban, who was the first Christian martyr in Britain. The licence for the consecration of the Church of St Alban was issued on 13 August 1866.

=== Education ===
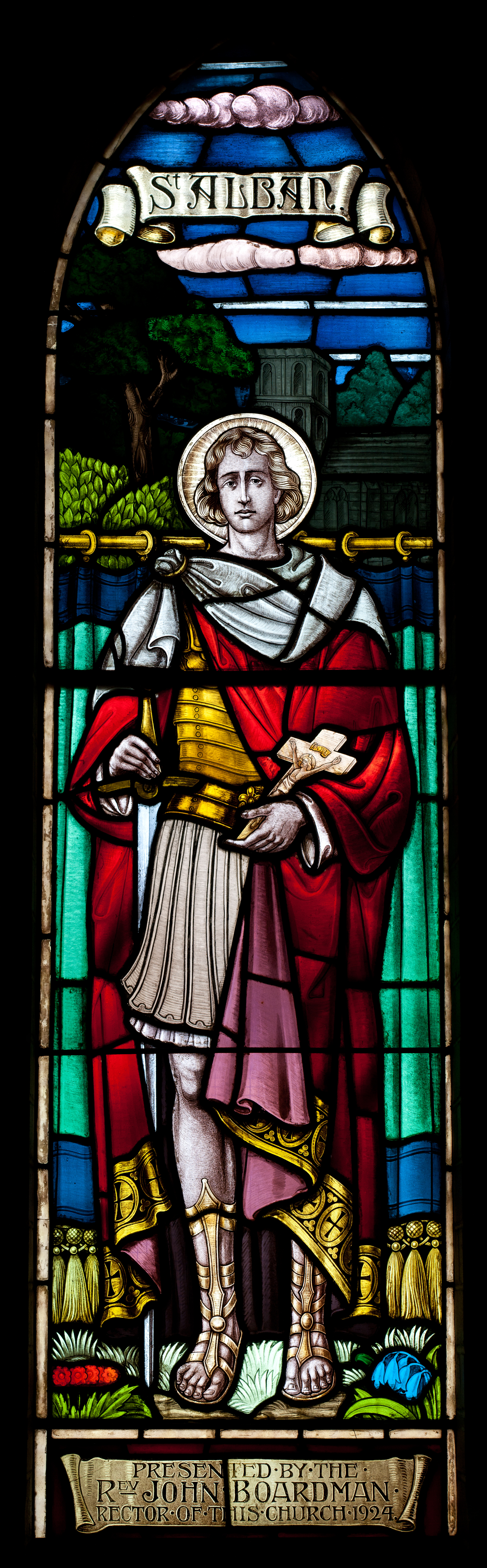
Saint Alban depicted in a stained glass window at St Alban's Anglican Church, Five Dock, New South Wales, Australia. The inscription on this memorial window reads "Presented by the Rev John Boardman Rector of this Church 1924".

Post initial construction of the church grounds, education began as the first and only school in the Five Dock district. The first headmaster was Mr William Booth, and his successor was Mr Peter McCormick (also known as 'Amicus'), who wrote the words and composed the music for Australia's current national anthem, Advance Australia Fair. The school was firstly started under a 'dual education' system similar to the Irish National Education System until 1861 when it became a public school under the Board of National Education. Attendance spanned between 27 and 60 children, as compulsory attendance was not enforced.

=== Storm demolition ===
During the construction of the new church on 27 November 1923, a strong southerly wind blew down the west wall of the church causing considerable damage. This event caused further funds to be used and pushed back the construction completion date.

== Land and buildings ==
=== Church ===
The original church building, which began its uses in 1859, served as a reliable place for the community to use as a place of worship. This original building was in use up until 1934, when a new church was erected to improve upon the outdated previous one. The previous church was used as a hall until the completion of the current building. Fund raising events were run to pay off the debt, such as three-day bazaars, concerts, street stalls and social evenings.

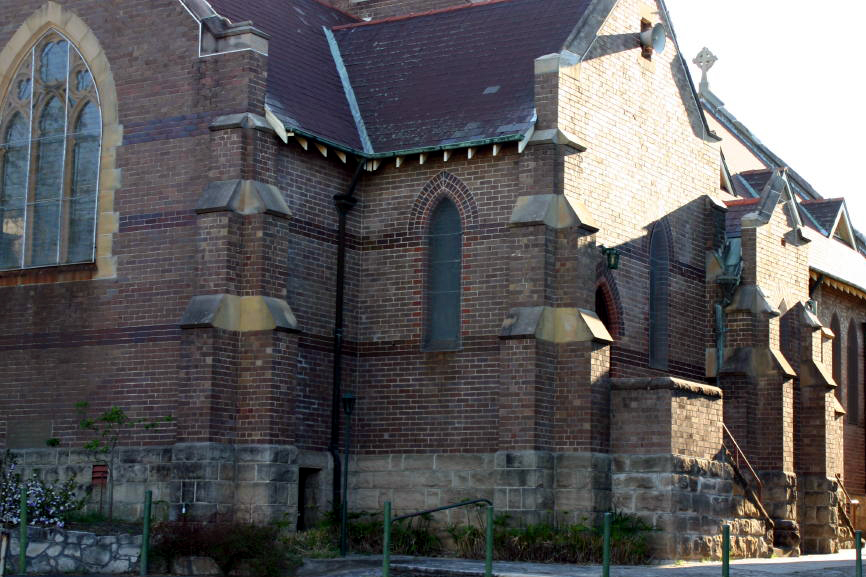
St Albans Anglican Church, 171–173 Great North Road, Five Dock, NSW, Australia.

==== Stained-glass windows ====
St Alban's is known for having particularly notable stained-glass windows due to their artistic design and long history. To supplement the construction of the current church, three stained-glass windows were donated by Mr W. R. Crocker, in memory of his father and uncle, William and John Crocker.

=== Rectory ===
The rectory is a two-story building of terracotta-coloured handmade sandstock bricks. It has nine rooms, a scullery and a kitchen. The first resident was Rev. J. Howell-Price as the appointed Rector.

=== Ridley Centre ===
Formerly known as the Majestic Hall, then the St Alban's Parish Hall in 1949, the Ridley Centre was erected to aid in space for Sunday school, ministry and for further church and community activities (see Current Uses section). It is named after Nicholas Ridley, the former Bishop of London and English Reformation martyr under the reign of Queen Mary I.

== Ministry ==
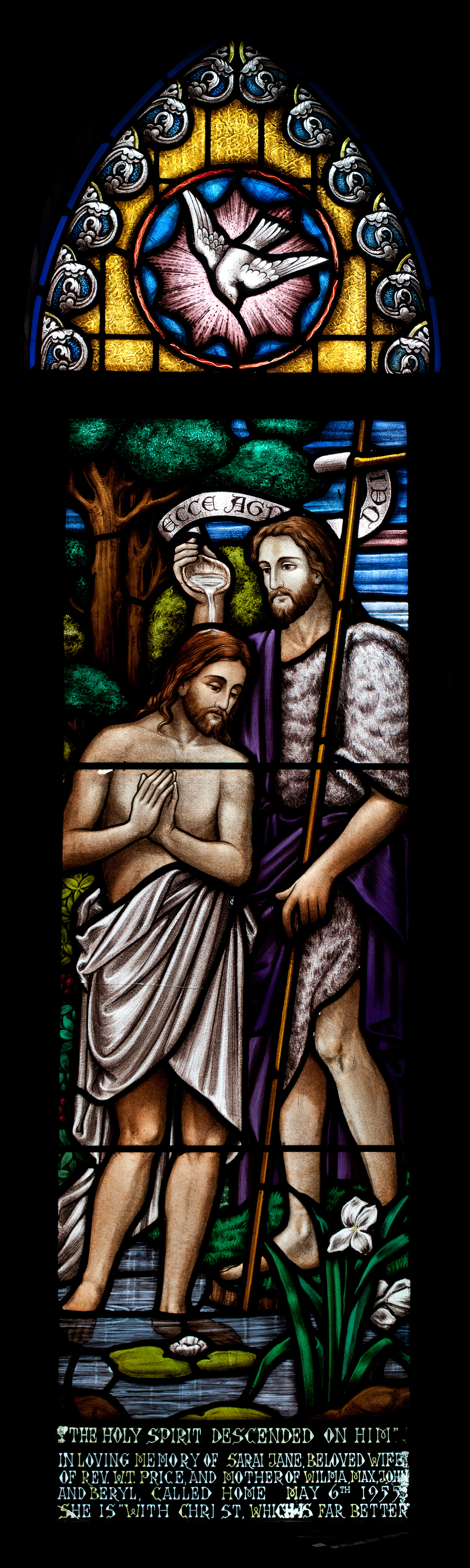
Stained glass window depicting Jesus' baptism, at St Alban's Anglican Church, Five Dock, New South Wales, Australia. The inscription reads "THE HOLY SPIRIT DESCENDED ON HIM" and "In Loving Memory of Sarai Jane, Beloved Wife of Rev. W. T. Price, and Mother of Wilma, Max, John and Beryl, Called Home May 6th 1955. She is 'With Christ, Which is Far Better'."

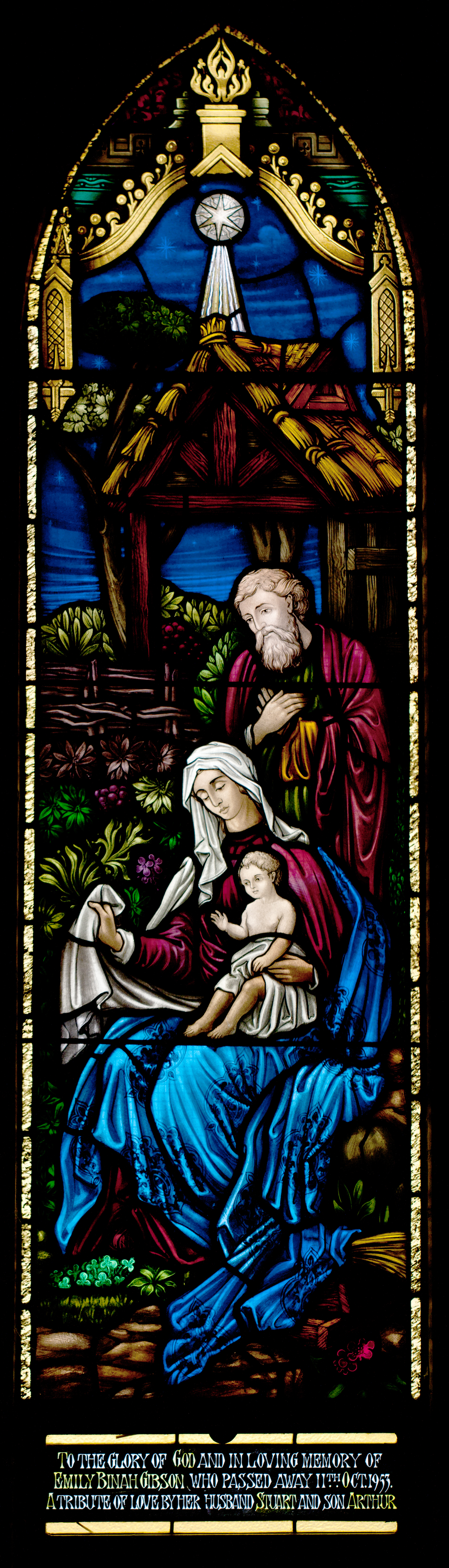
Stained glass window depicting Mary with Jesus, at St Alban's Anglican Church, Five Dock, New South Wales, Australia. The inscription reads "To the glory of GOD and in loving memory of Emily Binah Gibson who passed away 11th Oct. 1953. A tribute of love by her husband Stuart and son Arthur.".

=== Rectors ===
Rev. Thomas H. Wilkinson

The nephew of Rev. Frederick Wilkinson, he was one of the first students ordained at St James' Sydney in September 1846. Served six years in the Parish of Ashfield.

Rev. William Lumsdaine

In 1860, a month after his ordination as priest, Rev. W. Lumsdain was licensed as 'Minister in the United Parishes of Ashfield, Enfield and Burwood'. He was a Moore College student and was formerly a Presbyterian minister. Rev. Lumsdaine was in charge of four churches. During his time, the parishioners erected a font, in which Rev. Lumsdaine performed the first baptism ceremony. This was held on 17 June 1866, and others included well-known names of district pioneers such as Flippance, Budd, Dening, Burton-Bradley and Heming. He also conducted the first wedding and confirmation; the confirmation was held on 21 May 1869.

Rev. William Shatfield Newton 1880–1884

He took charge of Five Dock Parish after he was granted a general license in 1878. He held a Cambridge M.A. degree and was ordained deacon in 1860 and priest in 1861 by the Bishop of Llandaff (Wales). Rev. Newton also established the Croydon Collegiate School in 1878, also known as 'Rugby House' and 'The Grammar School'. This later became part of Presbyterian Ladies' College.

Rev. J. Howell-Price 1885–1887

Due to the rapid growth of the district and population, there was a need felt to appoint a resident minister. At this point plans went forth to erect a minister's residence on the church land. The plaque for the St Alban's rectory was unveiled on 10 October 1885. Rev. Howell-Price was ordained deacon in 1870 and priest in 1880 by the Bishop of Bathurst and was appointed curate-in-charge.

Rev. Richard Kemp 1887–1888

He was educated at St Paul's College and Sydney University, where he graduated as Master of Arts in 1873. He was ordained deacon in 1874 and priest in 1875. Rev. Kemp became ill, being reported in 1885 with 'an affection of the spine' which inhibited him from carrying out further ministry. He later recovered his health and practised law.

Rev. William Whitcombe 1889–1892

He trained at Moore College Liverpool, and was made deacon in 1875 and priest in 1876 by the Bishop of Bathurst. From 1875–1879 he was curate of Rylstone; 1879–83 at Christ Church St Lawrence; 1883–85 curate of St James King Street; 1885–88 locum tenens at Kapunda, a mining community in South Australia.

Rev. John Elkin 1892–1907

He was educated at Moore College, graduating in 1875, and ordained as priest in 1876 by the Bishop of Sydney. He previously was rector of Broughton (Berry) 1876–1882, rector of Lithgow with Wallerawang 1882–1885 and rector of St Paul's Lithgow 1885–1892. In 1900 a proposal was put forward to separate the Drummoyne Church from the Five Dock church; this was done in October 1900.

Rev. Stanley Grant Best 1907–1913

He graduated from Moore College in 1895, was made deacon in 1897 by the Bishop of Bathurst and priest in 1899 at Goulburn. Rev. Best gave the church a refreshing start, as he had the energy and ability to undergo renovations and repairs to the church building whilst also reorganising its finances. In Easter 1907 he started the Parish Paper, which informed parishioners of church activities. He also formed the St Alban's choir, which was one of the reasons to expand and build a parish hall, opened on 5 September 1907. When he left in 1913 a block of church land was bought, a new parish hall was erected, the Sunday school had grown to 226, Church offertories rose in two years by 350% and pew rents by 100%.

Rev. John Boardman 1913–1927

He was educated at St Paul's College and University of Sydney, and was made deacon in 1896 and priest in 1898 by the Archbishop of Sydney. He took part in military services as he was chaplain to the Boer War Forces in 1900–1902 and chaplain in the AIF 1918; he suffered ill-health due to this war service. As many of the congregation lost relatives and friends during the Great War, Rev. Boardman held Anzac services.

Rev. W. T. Price 1927–1942

He was trained at Moore College in 1907, he received Oxford and Cambridge preliminaries in 1907, was ordained priest in 1908 by the Archbishop of Sydney and inducted into St Alban's on 4 February 1927. Rev. Price expanded the work on extending the parish and church buildings.

Rev. Leslie George Edmondson 1942–1948

He graduated from Moore College in 1920, was ordained deacon in 1920 and priest in the same year by the Archbishop of Sydney. He was previously in charge of St Thomas' Rozell from 1941–1942. He encouraged choral work in the church. Parish finances were difficult due to the effects of the depression years. Rev. Edmondson brought all finances under one heading and worked on church finances heavily; this was done by creating fund raising activities. Rev. Edmondson became ill and died in 1951.

Rev. Norman Fox 1949–1954

He completed his training at Moore College in 1926, where he was a Barker Scholar. He was ordained priest in 1927 by the Archbishop of Sydney. He built up the church's appeal for young people and established multiple youth organisations, such as the Girls' Friendly Society and the Church of England Boys' Society.

Rev. Basil Williams 1954–1960

He was a New Zealander and was inducted as rector on 30 September 1954. He worked as a tutor and lecturer at Moore College. He introduced presenting Christmas Carols each year on the church's property. Rev. Williams also wished to maintain fellowship with the English Cathedral Church of St Alban.

Rev. Donald Edward Langshaw 1960–1965

He was trained at Moore College in Sydney. He was ordained deacon in 1945 and priest in the same year by the Archbishop of Sydney, and previously served at St Matthew's Manly, Mascot, Harris Park and Naremburn. He also was interested in work for young people and strengthened youth groups; in 1961 he established a very successful Pathfinders group. Rev. Langshaw resigned in May 1965 to become rector of All Souls' Leichhardt.

Rev. Roy Francis Gray 1965–1973

He graduated from Moore College and was ordained deacon in 1947 and priest in 1948 by the Archbishop of Sydney. He also served at Hammondville, Cooks River, Hurstville and Wollongong whilst also having a long association with CMF (Citizens' Military Forces) as part-time chaplain. Rev. Gray was appointed Rural Dean of Petersham and his ministry at St Alban's concluded when he resigned in 1973 to become rector of St Andrew's Cronulla.

Rev. William Frank Hayward 1973–1986

He was trained at NZ Bible Institute, and was ordained deacon and priest in 1952 by the Archbishop of Sydney after serving at Corrimal, Riverstone, Berowra and Belfield. He began at St Alban's on 1 June 1973. Rev. Hayward always stressed the importance of having a church family and to meet regularly.

Rev. Andrew Katay 2008–

He was trained at Moore College in Sydney, and was previously a Senior Associate Minister at St. Barnabas, Broadway, and Anglican chaplain at the University of Sydney, whilst leading the staff team of the Sydney University Evangelical Union. Rev. Katay's work involved the amalgamation of both the St Alban's site and St John's, Ashfield. This involved combining the staff over both sites to push for a single vision and sharing values. His arrival marked a change from two traditional communion services to congregations with a variety of styles.

== Current uses ==
St Alban's, Five Dock provides a range of events and weekly activities for the community to take part in. Internal uses for public events include Christmas events such as Carols on the Lawn, Advent Wreath Making and Gingerbread House Building. Festival events include the We Love Five Dock Festival and taking part in the Ferragosto Five Dock event. Weekly groups include Bounce, which is a playgroup for local families, Fellowship Groups and Holiday Clubs. External uses include ballet classes run in the Ridley Centre and also regular guitar lessons through Sydney Guitar school. The church premises also provide a location for funeral services.

=== Music ===
Music at St Alban's is primarily ministry directed, with public music events such as carols and Easter services.

==== Organ ====
St Alban's organ is of mixed vintage and can't be attributed to a specific builder. It was initially installed in St Matthew's Anglican Church in Manly and then was transferred to St Alban's Five Dock in 1930. The Organ was renovated in 1959 and 1969, where the pitch was altered by S.T. Noad & Son. A large portion of the metal pipework is of Fincham manufacture and other ranks of pipes were likely made by William Davidson. The organ specifications include; Great: 8 Open Diapason, 8 Stopped Diapason, 8 Dulciana, 4 Principal and 2 Piccolo. Swell: 16 Bourdon, 8 Open Diapason, 8 Stopped Diapason, 8 Salicional, 4 Gemschorn and 8 Oboe. Pedal: 16 Bourdon and 8 Flute.

== Stained Glass Windows ==
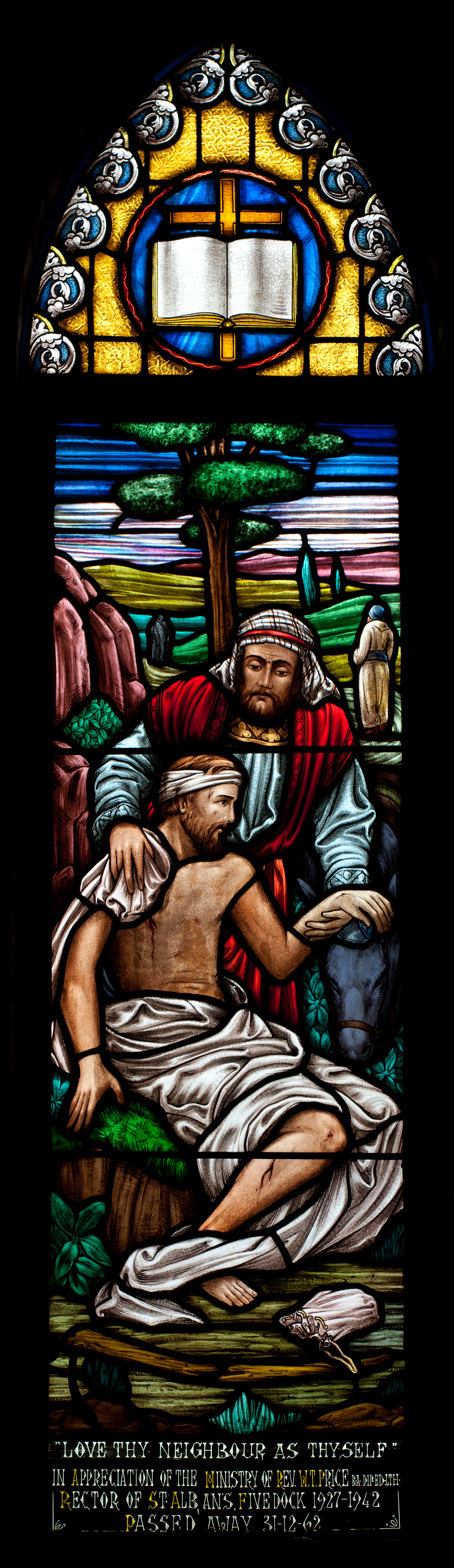
Stained glass window depicting the parable of the Good Samaritan.

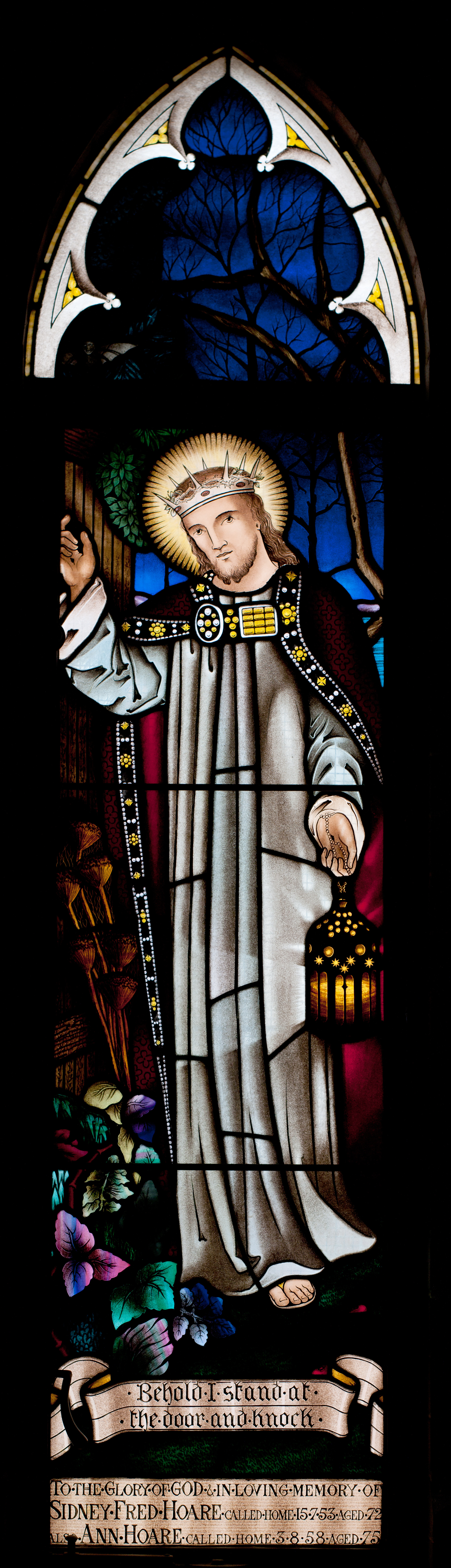
Stained glass based on William Holman Hunt's The Light of the World

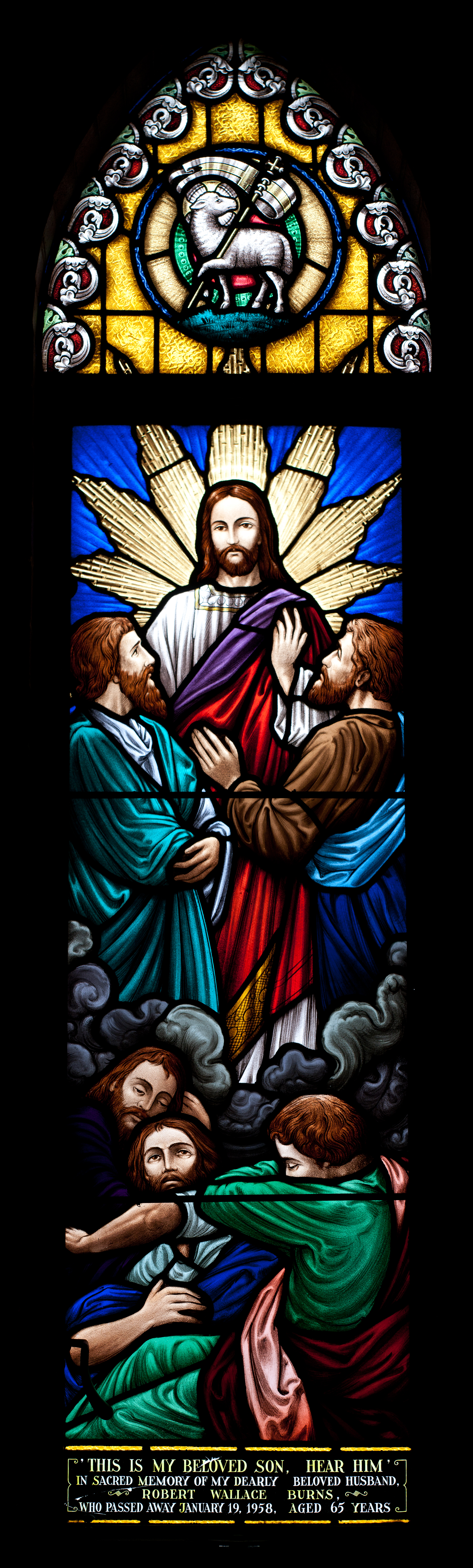
The Transfiguration

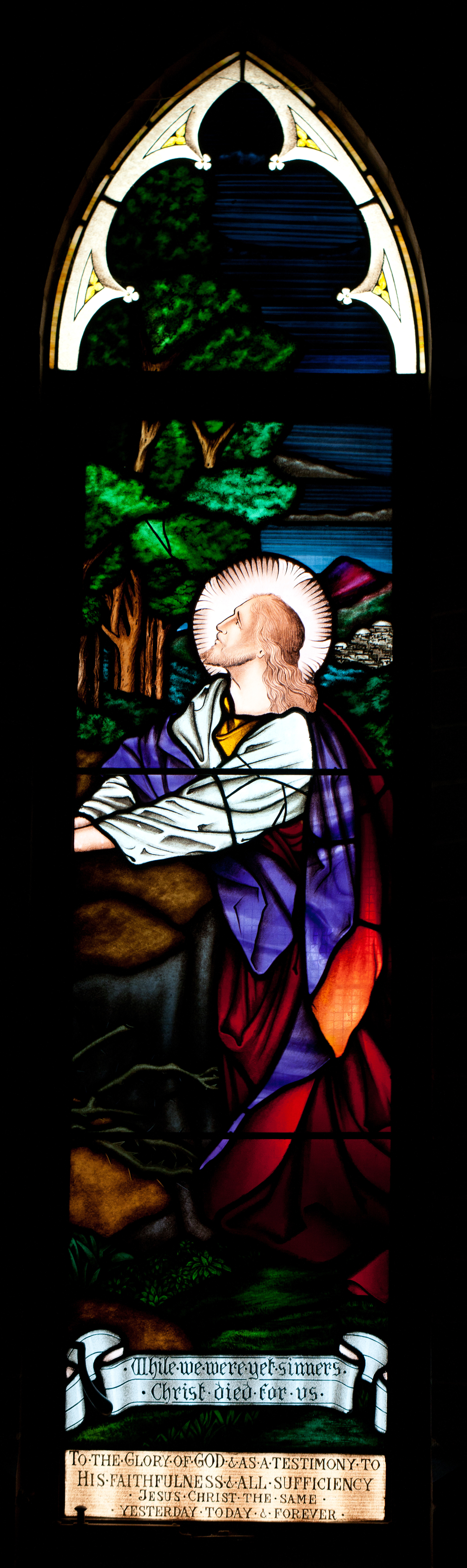
Jesus at Gethsemane

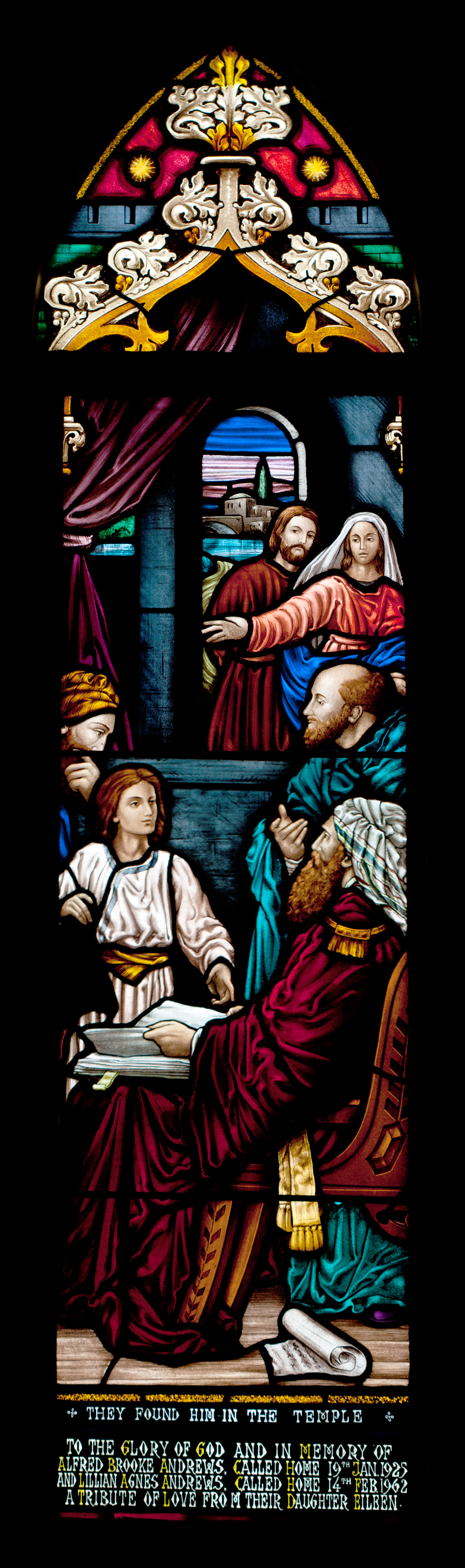
Young Jesus at the temple

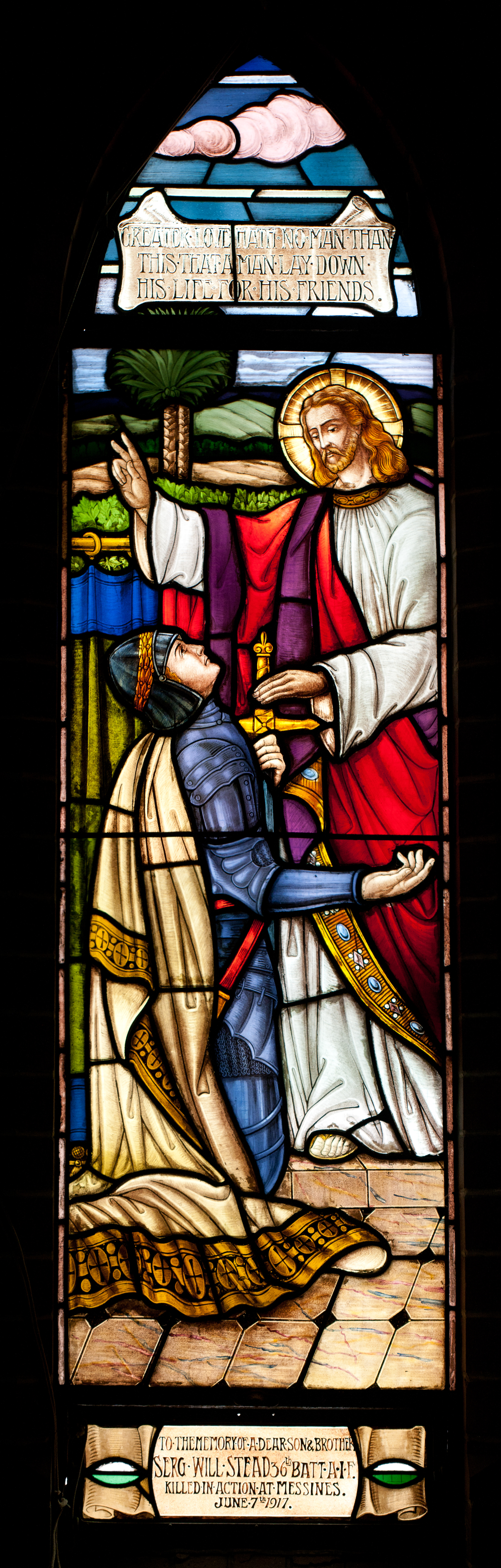
Greater love hath no man than this

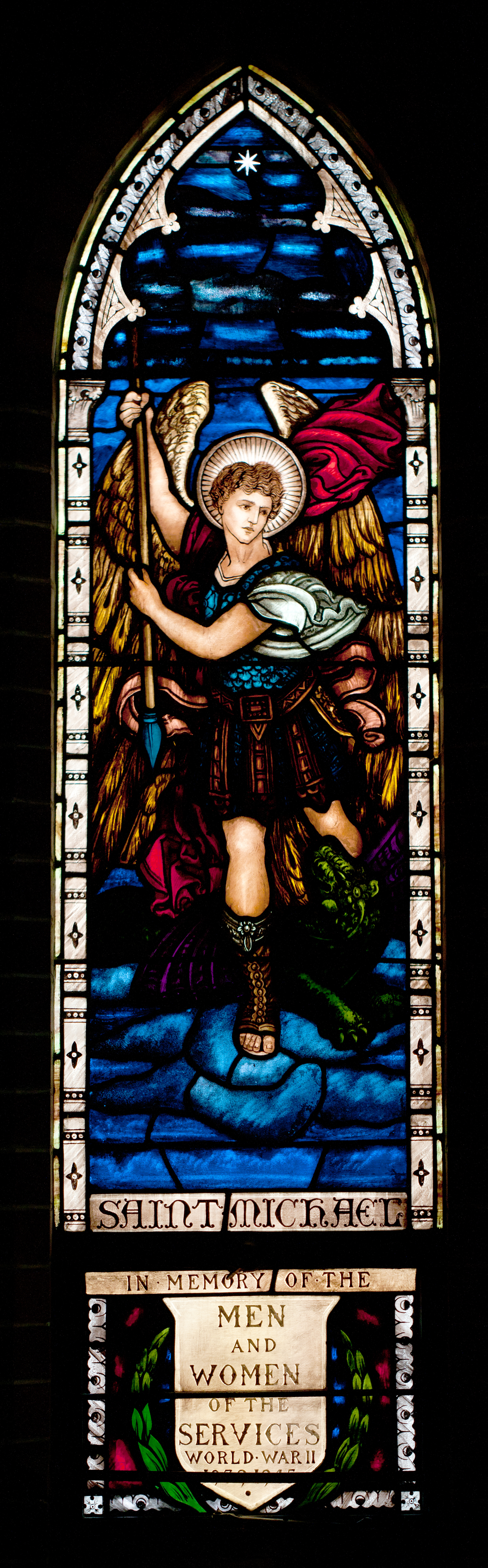
Saint Michael

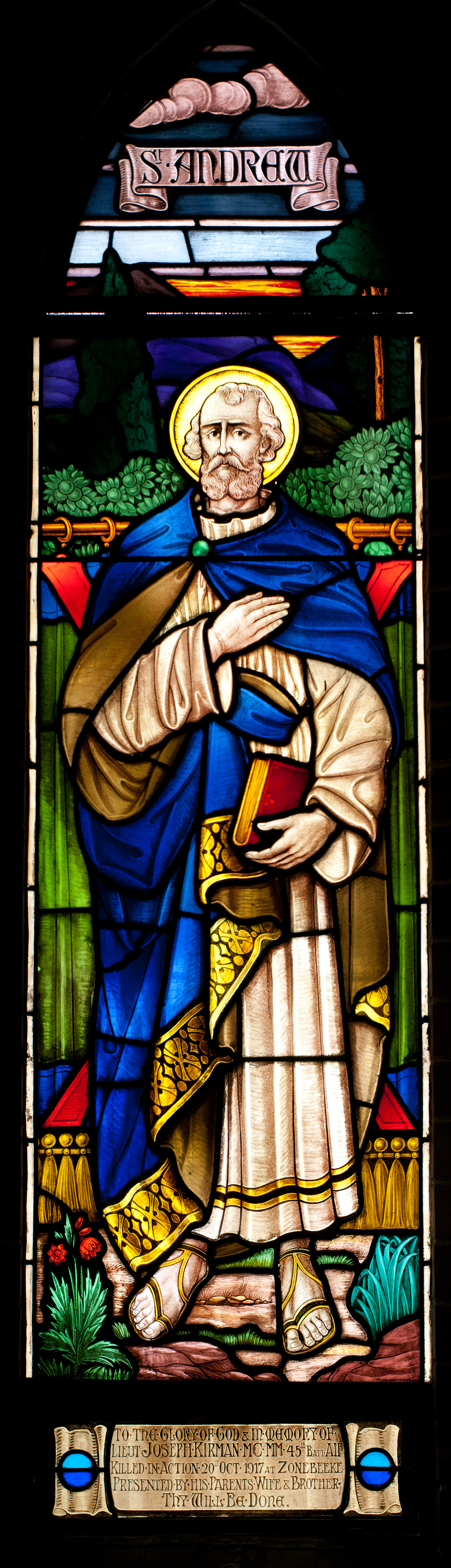
St Andrew

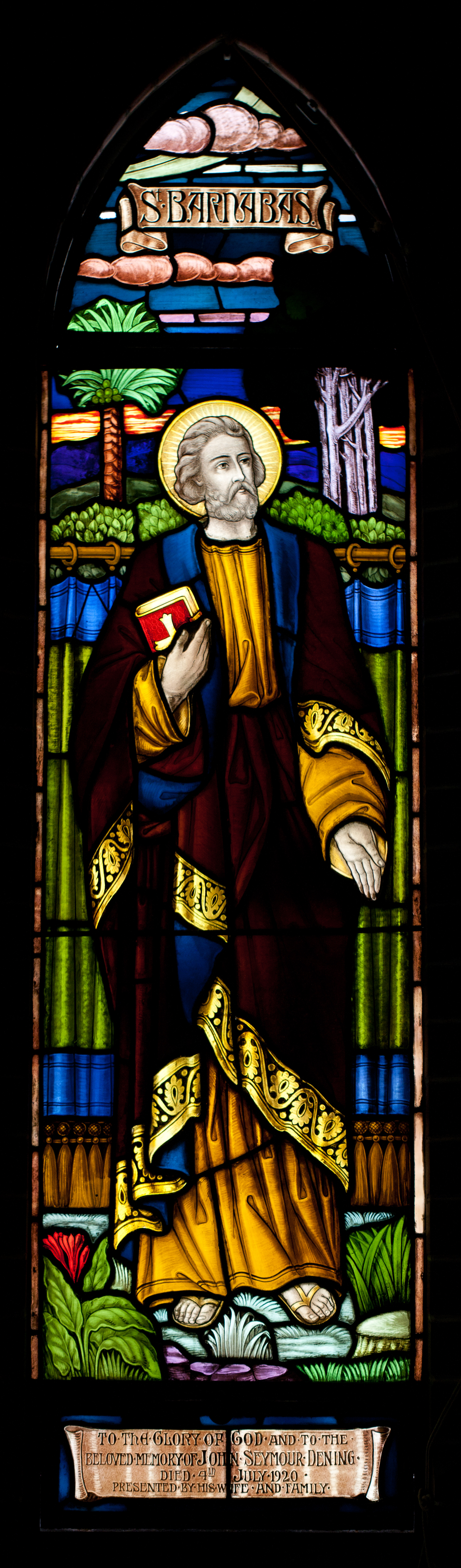
St Barnabas

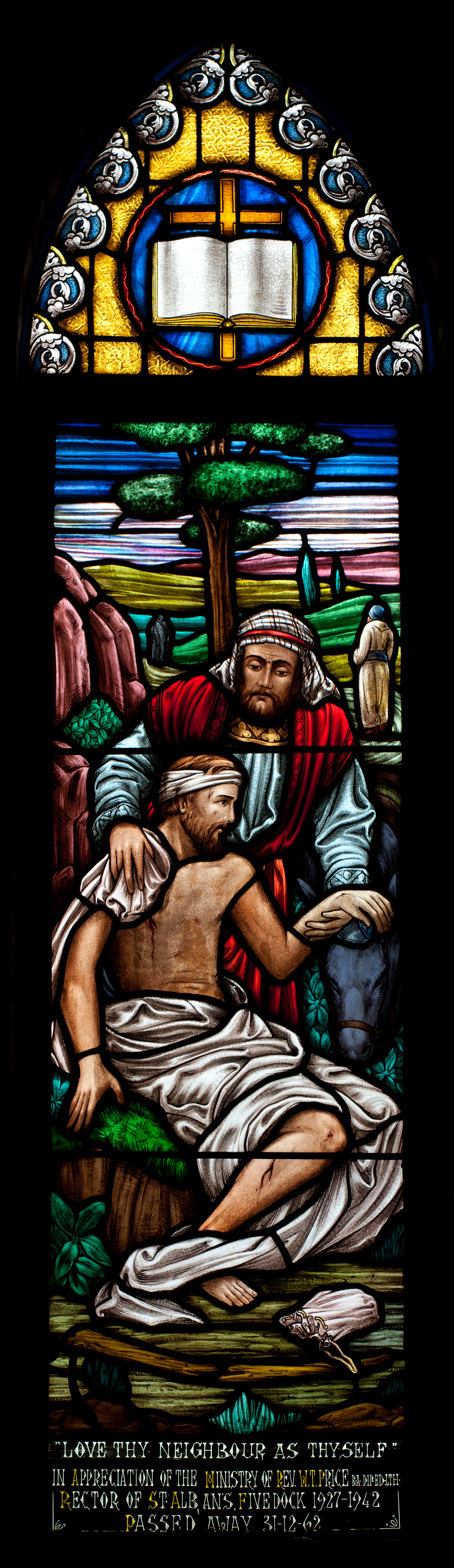
The Good Samaritan

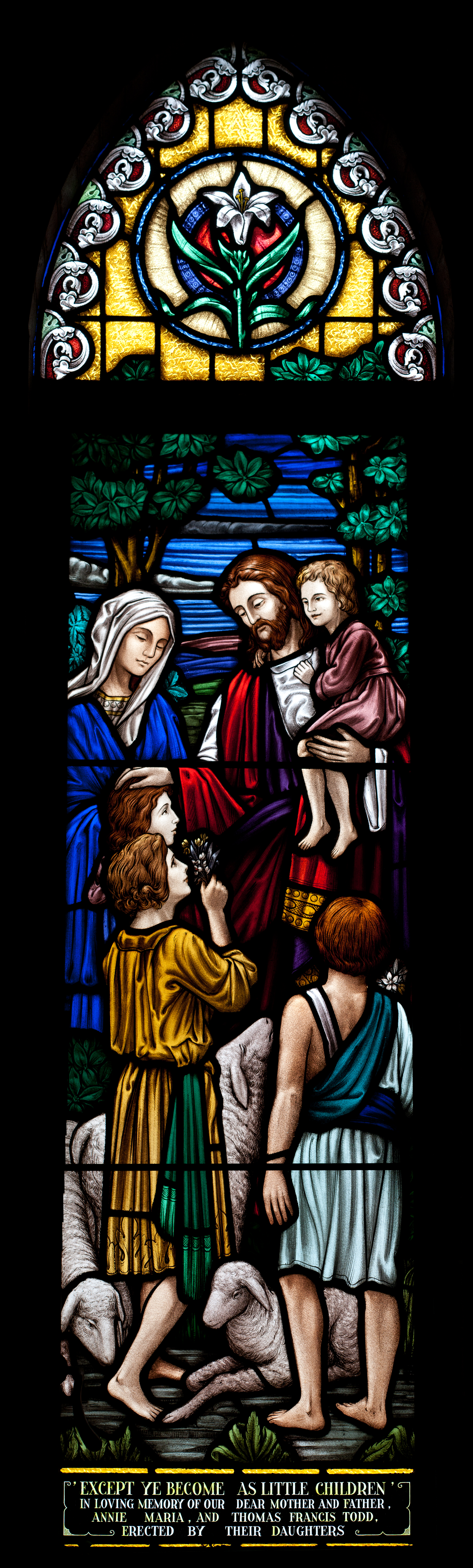
Jesus welcoming the children

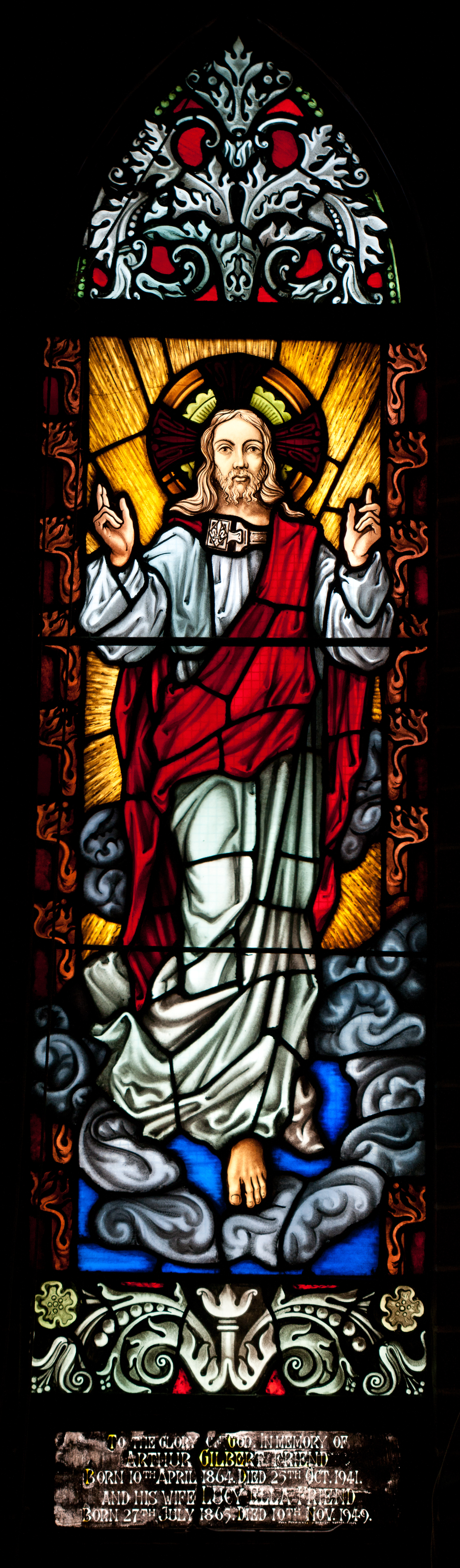
Jesus in glory

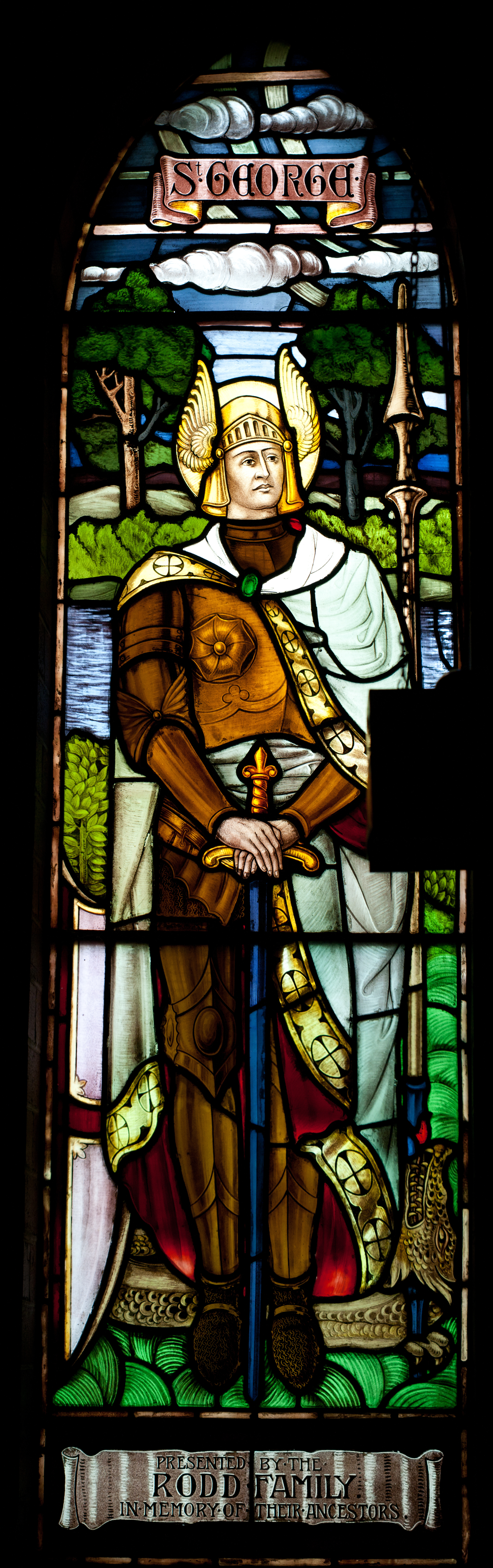
St George, in memory of the Rodd family

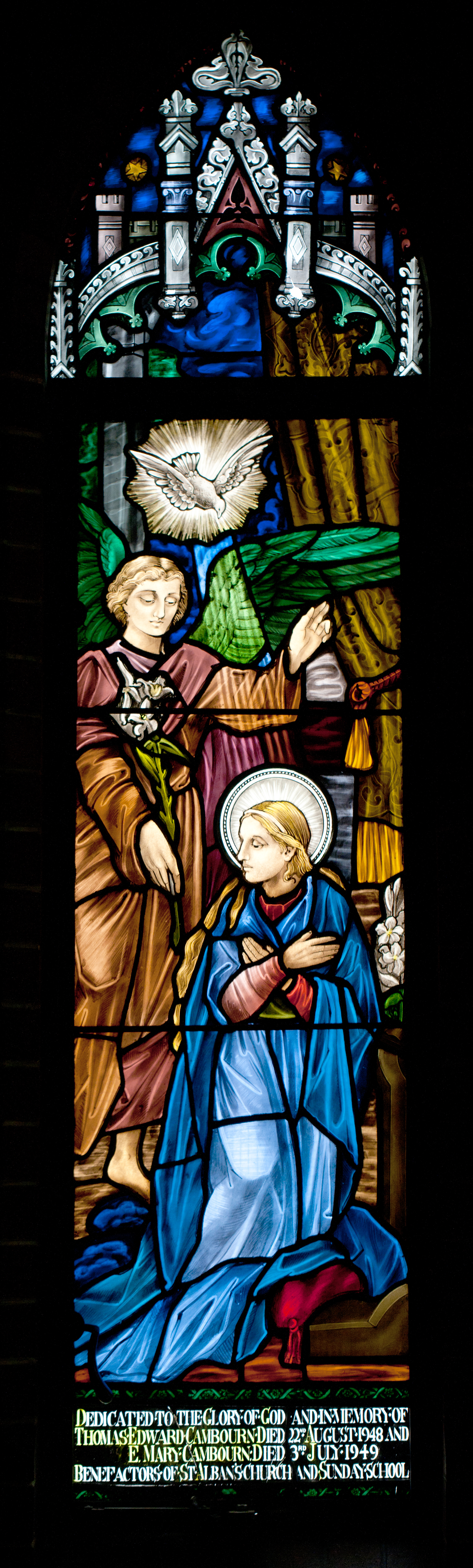
The Annunciation

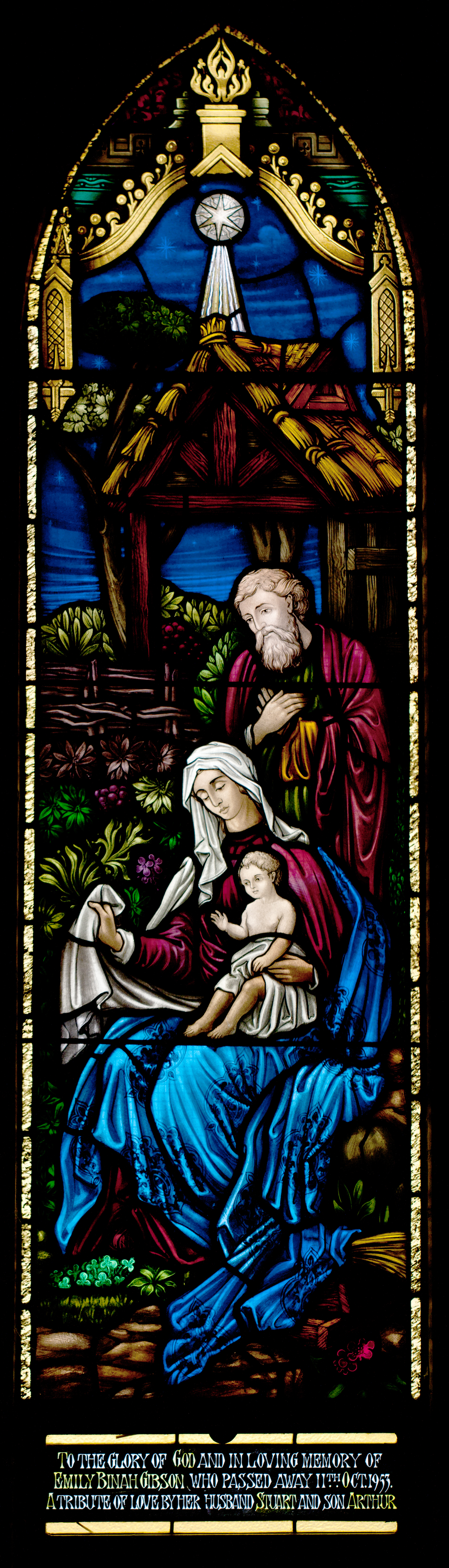
The birth of Jesus

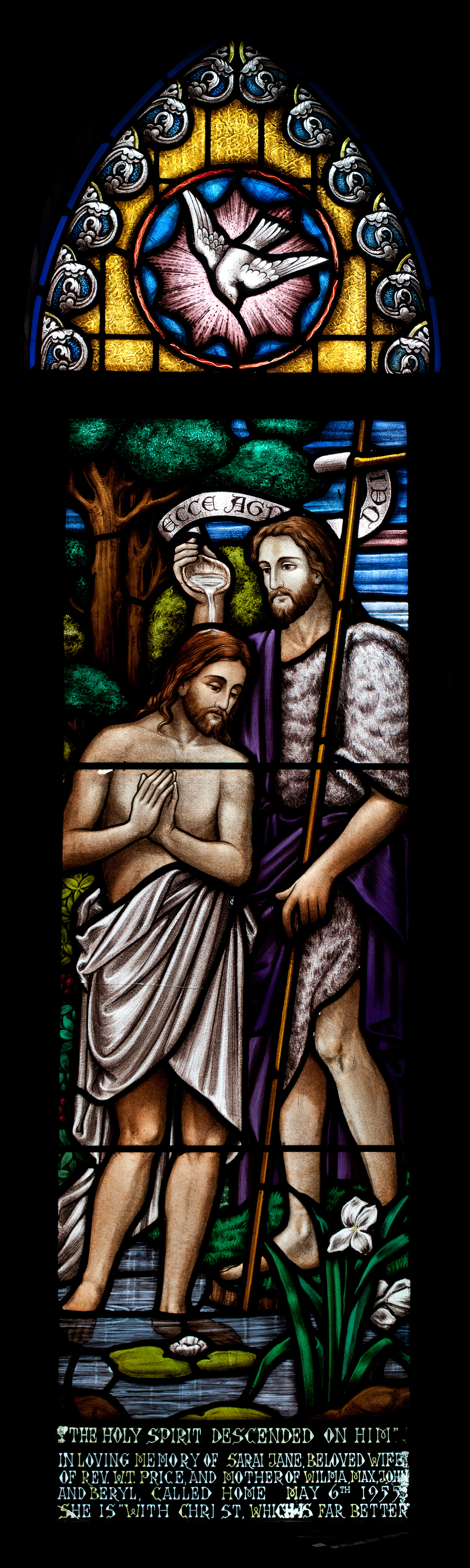
The baptism of Jesus by John

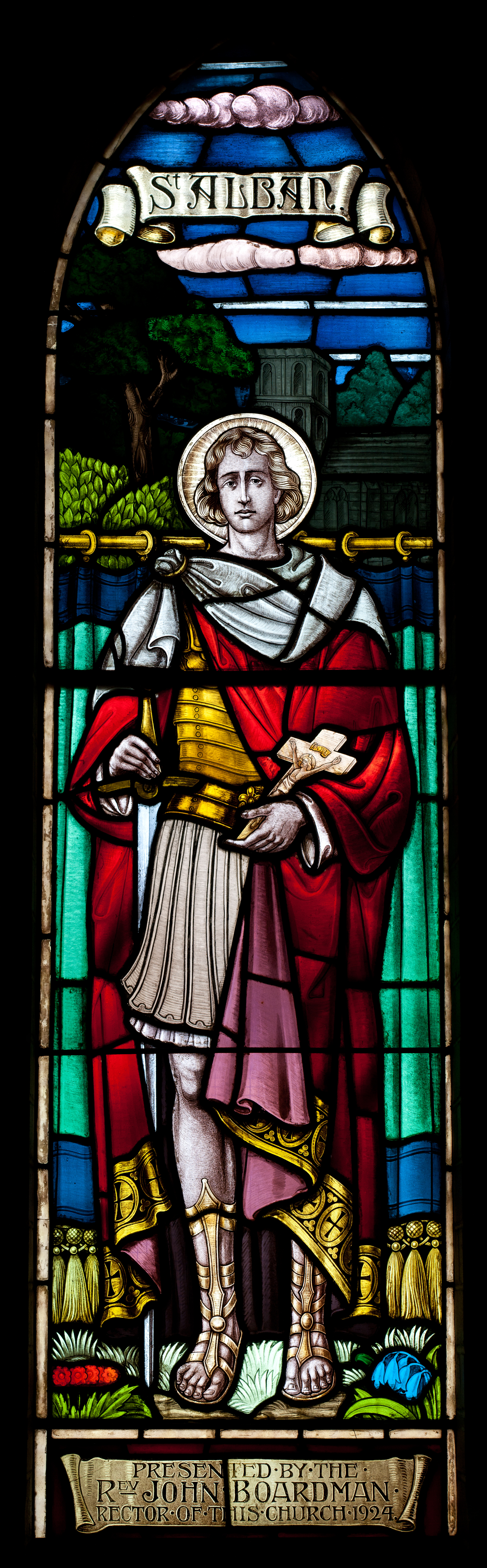
St Alban

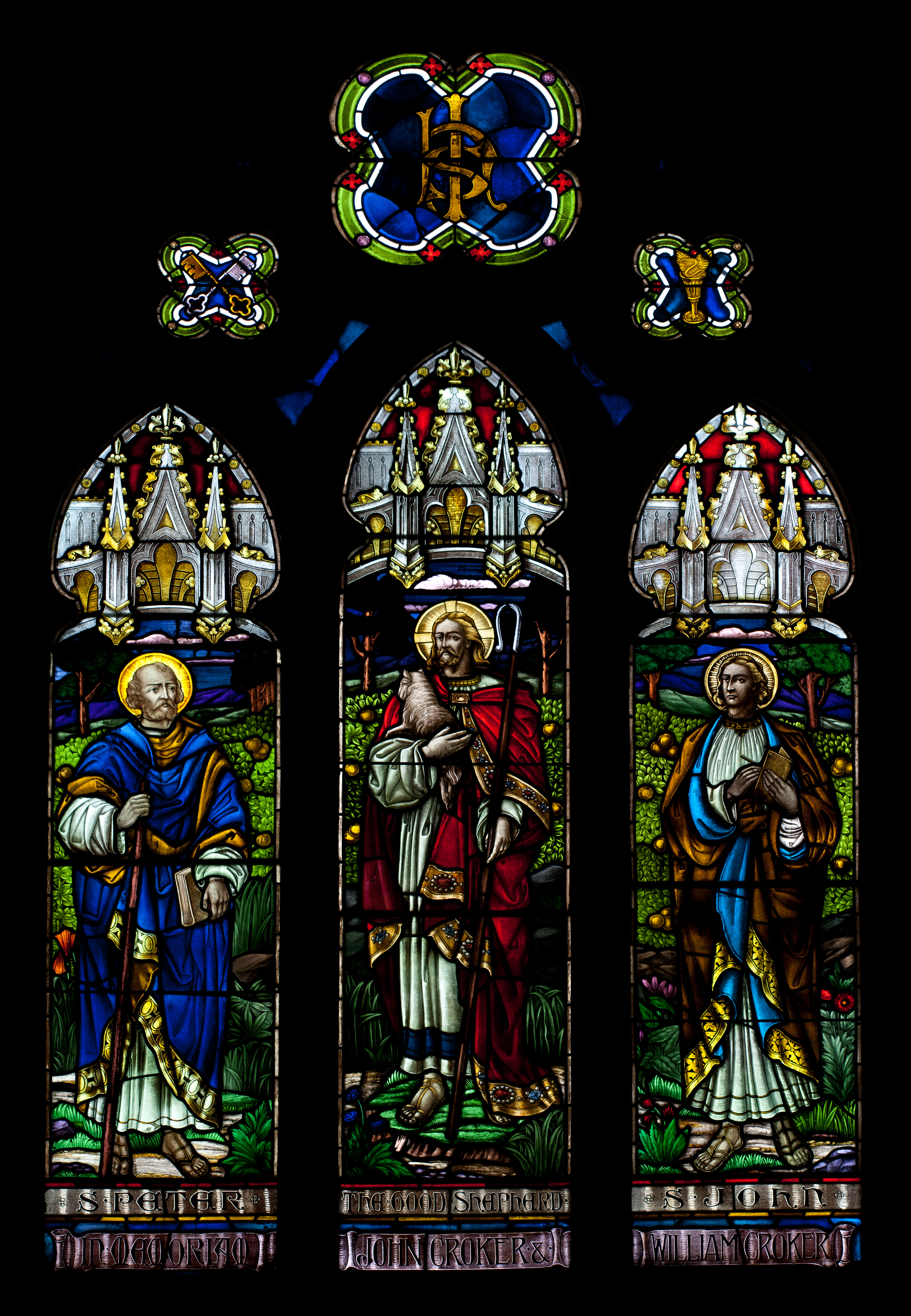
The front window: Jesus with Peter and John

== See also ==
- Australian non-residential architectural styles
- List of Anglican churches in the Diocese of Sydney
