= Five Dock =

- Suburb
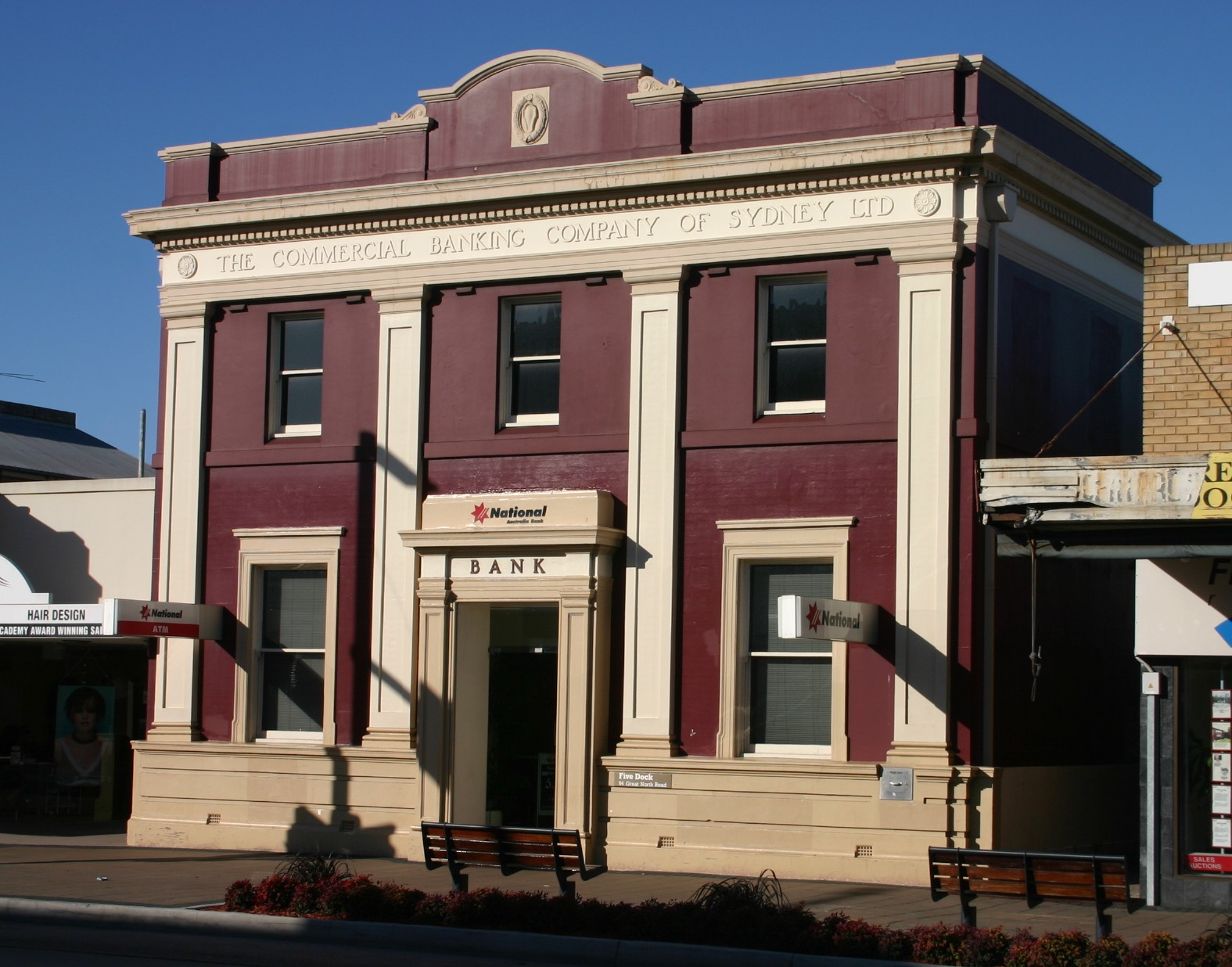
- Old bank building on Great North Road, Five Dock

- Interactive map of Five Dock
- Coordinates: 33°51′54″S 151°07′43″E
- Country: Australia
- State: New South Wales
- City: Sydney
- LGA: City of Canada Bay
- Location: 10 km (6.2 mi) west of Sydney CBD
- Established: 1794

Government
  - State electorate: Drummoyne
  - Federal division: Reid

Area
  - Total: 2.45 km^{2} (0.95 sq mi)
- Elevation: 22 m (72 ft)

Population
  - Total: 9,823 (SAL 2021)
- Postcode: 2046
Suburbs around Five Dock
Concord	Wareemba	Russell Lea
Canada Bay	Five Dock	Rodd Point
Croydon	Ashfield	Haberfield

Five Dock is a suburb in the Inner West of Sydney, in the state of New South Wales, Australia. Five Dock is located 10 kilometres west of the Sydney central business district, in the local government area of the City of Canada Bay.

== Location ==
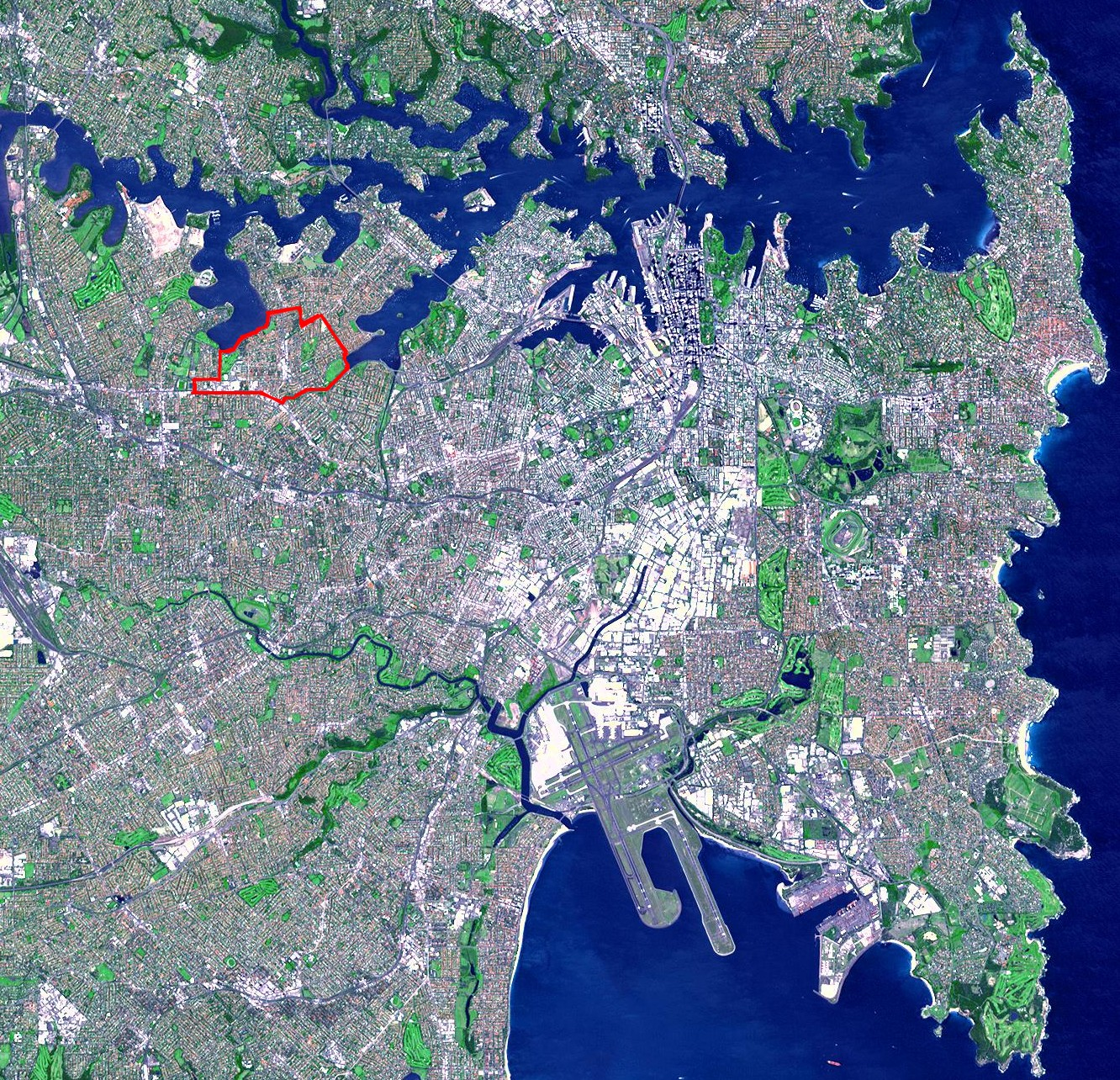
NASA image of Sydney Five Dock's borders in red.

Five Dock lies roughly at the foot, or southern end, of the Drummoyne peninsula. More precisely, Five Dock lies between Parramatta Road and the City West Link to the south and Hen & Chicken Bay, on the Parramatta River, along with the suburbs of Wareemba and Russell Lea, to the north. Its total area is 2.45 km^{2} (0.95 sq mi).

Rodd Point lies to the east. Haberfield adjoins Five Dock to the south-east. Iron Cove forms a small section of the suburb's eastern boundary. Ashfield and Croydon lie on the other side of Parramatta Road, to the south. The suburbs of Canada Bay and Concord adjoin Five Dock's western boundary. Burwood lies just beyond Croydon, to the south-west.

From the heart of the shopping centre, it is approximately 7.5 kilometres (4.7 mi) to the Sydney central business district, measured in a straight line from the General Post Office in Martin Place. By road, this same distance is about 9–10 kilometres (5.6–6.2 mi), depending on the route taken.

== History ==
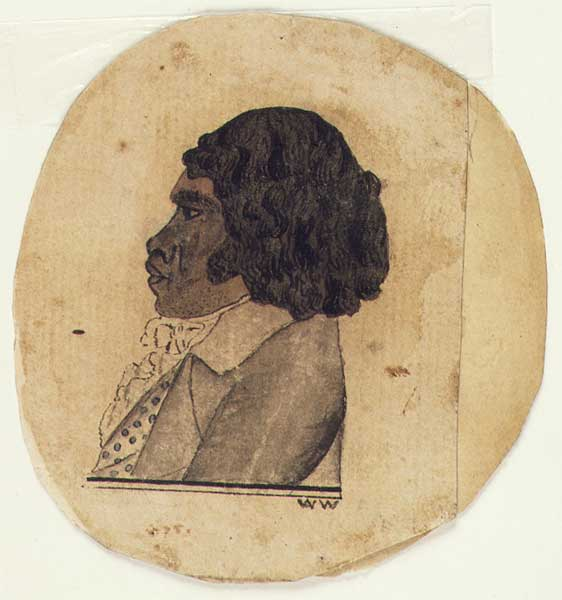
Portrait (signed "W.W.") thought to depict Bennelong

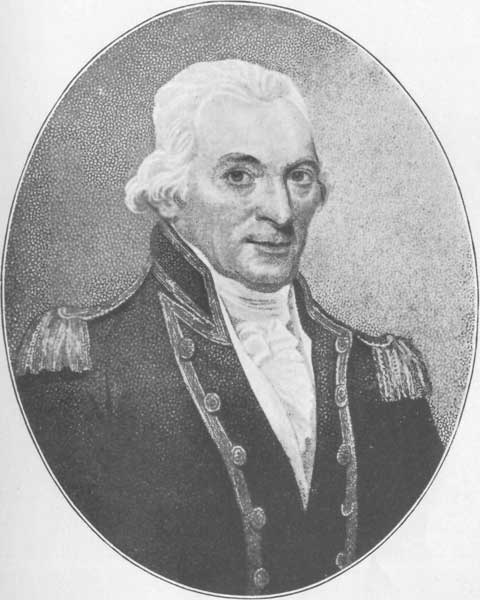
John Hunter, explorer and Governor of New South Wales

=== Origin of the name ===
The earliest written reference to Five Dock is in The Sydney Gazette of 3 February 1805, which mentions Five Dock Bay. All of the sources referenced are in agreement that it was derived from the shape of the bay along the Parramatta River.

According to a publication from the Maritime Services Board, Port of Sydney, (Volume 9, No 3, September 1965), "At the NE point of the bay there were five water worn indentations that were likened to docks, hence the name Five Dock." There is widely contradictory information, however, about how many of these natural formations still exist. The Maritime Services Board publication concludes that there "are two of the five remaining". However, Eric Russell's Drummoyne: a western suburbs' history from 1794 states that one was lost with the construction of the 1881 Gladesville Bridge, but "the others remain in 1982". Other sources give different numbers again.

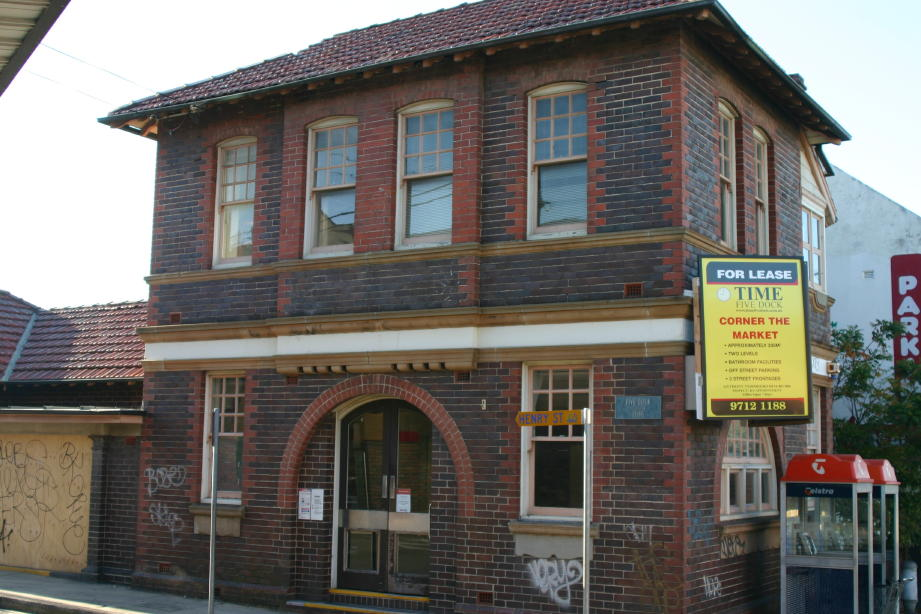
The former Five Dock Post Office, Great North Road

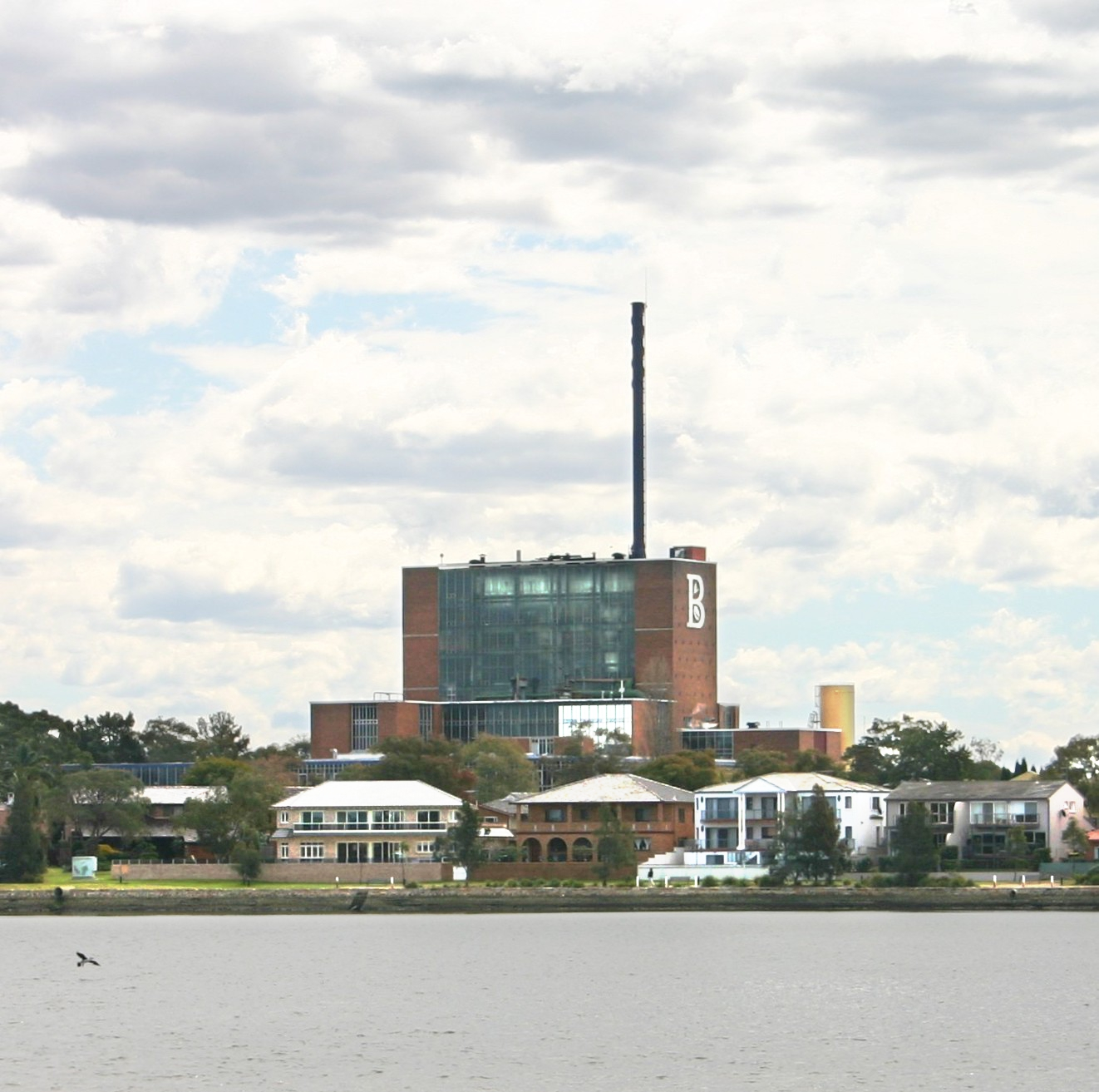
Bushells factory in Concord over Kings Bay and Canada Bay from Friend Avenue, Five Dock

=== Local names ===
Many Five Dock streets are named after mayors, aldermen and other associated with local government, including Charles Street, Corden Avenue, Henley Marine Drive, Hill Street, Howley Street, Ingham Avenue, Kerin Avenue, McGrath Avenue, McKinnon Avenue, Myler Street, Preston Avenue, Sutton Street, Timbrell Drive, Udall Avenue, West Street and William Street.

Another series of streets is named after early landowners, subdividers and prominent local businessmen, including Ramsay Road, Taylor Street, Mitchell Street, Betts Avenue, Friend Avenue, Harris Road, Gildea Avenue and Bennett Avenue. Rickard Street, Noble Street, Heath Street and Augusta Street were named after Sir Arthur Rickard and members of his family. Rodd Road, Trevanion Street and Barnstaple Road are named after Brent Clements Rodd and members of his family. A few streets take their name from local residents, including Mackaness Close and Langsworth Way.

The Great White Fleet visited Sydney in August 1908 and several local street names recall ships in the fleet. Connecticut Avenue is named after USS Connecticut. Illinois Road is named after USS Illinois. Minnesota Avenue takes its name from USS Minnesota. New Jersey Road takes its name from USS New Jersey.

A few streets are named after prominent people: Queens Road after Queen Victoria; Garfield Avenue after American President James Garfield, Kingsford Avenue after Charles Kingsford Smith, Bevin Avenue after Ernest Bevin and Henry Lawson Avenue after Henry Lawson, who lived on Great North Road briefly in 1922. The name of Coronation Avenue commemorates the coronation of King George VI and Queen Elizabeth.

== Churches ==
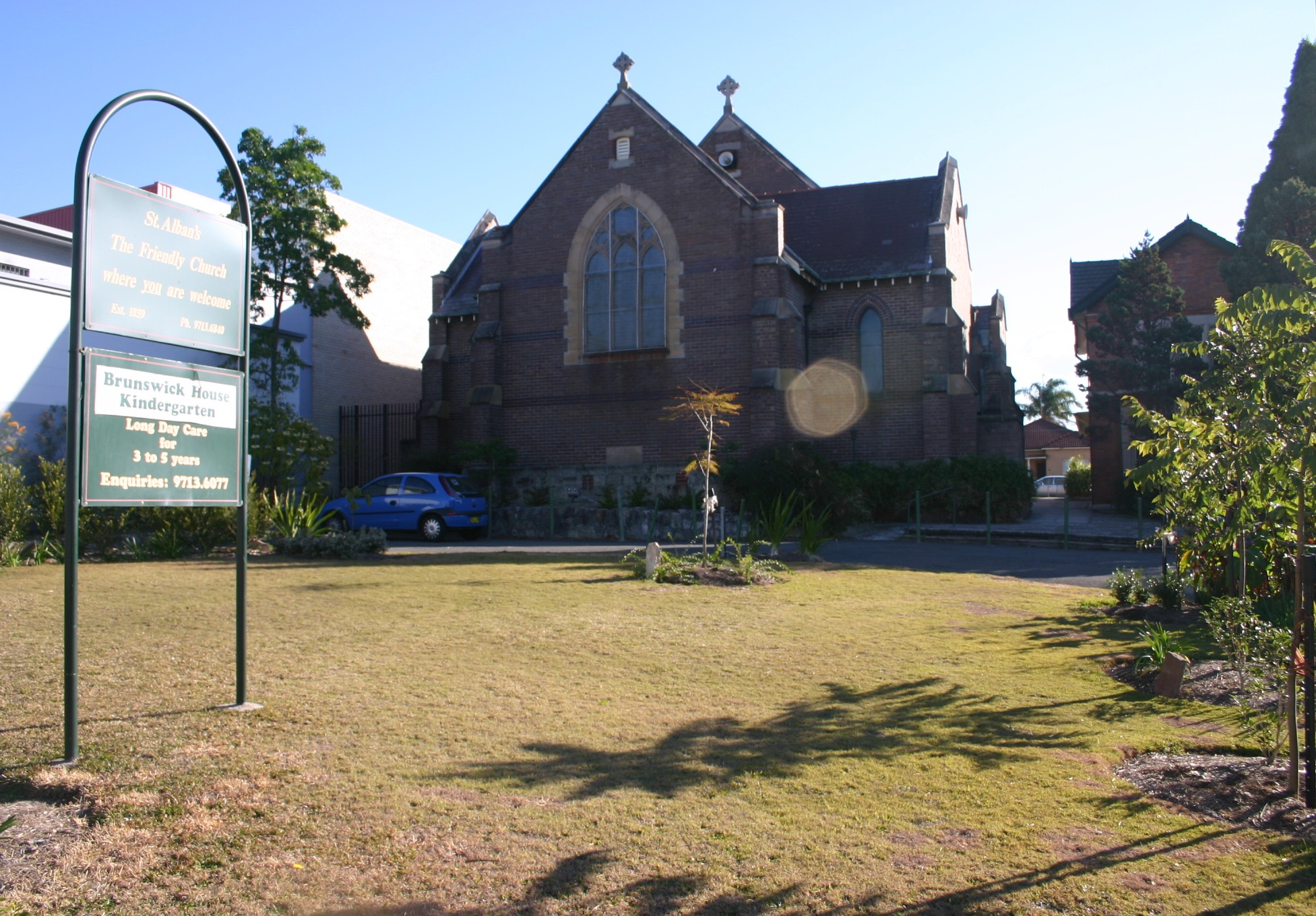
St Alban's Anglican Church, Great North Road

St Alban's Anglican Church is a 1924 Gothic church, constructed of brick and stone. It is well-built church, using locally quarried stone, and remains very well preserved. It is a heritage item and is listed in the Department of the Environment and Heritage's Australian Heritage database. Significant or attractive features of the church include its interior carpentry, the pipe organ (which dates from 1891 and was built by W. Davidson) and its stained glass. St Alban's rectory is on the same large site as the church, and together they form an important group. The foundations of the rectory, like those of the church, are constructed of local stone. In 2008 the church was part of an amalgamation with the Parishes of Ashfield and Haberfield, forming Christ Church Inner West Anglican Community.

== Schools ==
All Hallows' Parish School, Domremy College, Five Dock Public School, Lucas Gardens School, Rosebank College.

The foundation stone of Five Dock Public School was laid in the grounds of St Albans church in 1858, and it opened in 1861.

=== Domremy College Five Dock ===
Named after Joan of Arc's birthplace, Domremy, Domremy College is a Catholic Secondary School for girls. It is located on First Avenue, opposite Five Dock Park. The school was founded in 1911, initially having just 12 students. The school originally taught students from infants through to the end of senior school. This was later scaled back to just years 7 to 10. However, since 1985, the school has taught girls from year 7 through to year 12. The Domremy Convent group is listed on the NSW Heritage Office State Heritage Register.

== Houses ==
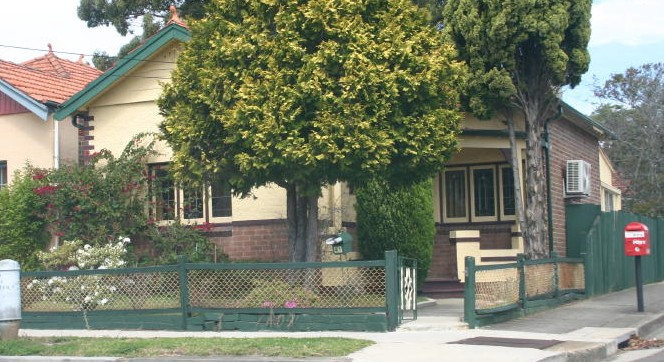
Typical Five Dock bungalow house

Housing in Five Dock consists mainly of detached dwellings. Like many suburbs in the inner-west of Sydney, Five Dock has some well-preserved examples of Australian Federation architecture and California Bungalow style residences. Many of these homes have been renovated however, and have not retained all of their original features.

Many dwellings in Five Dock are detached houses, frequently with generously sized gardens. According to the 2011 census, of the 3,760 dwellings in the suburb, 1,676 consist of separate houses, 472 were other types of houses and 1,228 were flats or apartments. Despite the preponderance of houses, post-World War II development has involved a high proportion of apartment construction. Recently, several major residential developments have been completed. An example is the 'Pendium' development in Garfield Street, which includes 102 apartments, a refurbished supermarket and the local library. Another recent example is the redevelopment of the former EnergyAustralia site in Fairlight Street into 93 units .

As of October 2005, there are a total of 51 items in the suburb that are heritage listed by the NSW Heritage Office. In addition, the skateboard track in Five Dock Park is being considered for listing as a heritage item under the State Heritage Items Project.

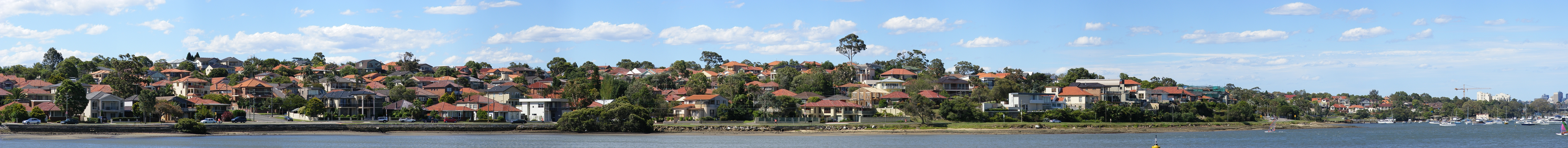
Houses along the Bay run in Five Dock

== Commercial area ==
The Five Dock retail and commercial centre is made up of a long line of shops, banks, restaurants and other services which run for about 500 metres (1,600 ft) along Great North Road in a section between Lyons Road and Queens Road. It features a high proportion of small local businesses. There are a number of shops selling Italian foods which reflects the number of residents of Italian background. The Five Dock telephone exchange is located at 190-192 Great North Road. Previously home to independent supermarket retailer, Supabarn, Coles purchased key locations from Supabarn and is now the primary supermarket in Five Dock.

== Parks ==
Five Dock has two separate stretches of publicly accessible foreshore on the Parramatta River. One of these foreshore stretches constitutes a small section of the Bay Run, a popular 7 km walking and cycling track which passes through several other suburbs along its way around Iron Cove. The other foreshore area lies on Hen & Chicken Bay and Kings Bay, and features a pedestrian and bike path leading around the bay towards Abbotsford.

In addition, there are several public parks located around Five Dock, the three largest being Timbrell Park, Five Dock Park and Halliday Park. A large section of Barnwell Park Golf Course, which is owned by Canada Bay Council, is located in Five Dock. A nine-hole golf course was constructed in 1963-4, and a second nine holes was completed in 1974 with much of the course lying on reclaimed land.

=== Timbrell Park ===
Timbrell Park comprises a number of multi-use sports fields and an amenities block. This field is the home ground of the Five Dock Falcons baseball team. Also located at Timbrell Park is an all abilities playground, Livvi's Place - an initiative of the City of Canada Bay, Touched by Olivia Foundation and Leighton Contractors. Livvi's Place was developed to reduce the barriers experienced by those with special needs, and allow children of all abilities to play together, side by side. In 2010, Livvi's Place in Five Dock was named as the best play space in the country by Parks and Leisure Australia. Located outside Livvi's Place is Livvi's Cafe which opened in 2014.

=== Five Dock Park and Oval ===
Five Dock Park was the first park in the borough with 28 acres of land being purchased from the government in 1883 for 5000 pounds. It is listed on the NSW Heritage Office State Heritage Register and centres around The Five Dock War Memorial. The plaque at the memorial says that the foundation stone was laid in 1923. The memorial was renovated and rededicated in 1987. The park also contains a number of recreational facilities, including a large skate boarding area, a bowling club, tennis courts, an oval (used for junior rugby league matches and cricket), childcare facilities and an off-leash area for dogs. Originally constructed in 1979, the park's skate boarding and bmx area was extremely popular during the 1980s but gradually fell into disrepair. An article published in the Village Voice in 2002 said the National Skateboarders' Association had nominated Five Dock skate park as one of the three worst in NSW because it was in such a poor condition, with a subsequent article discussing calls for its upgrade. The new skatepark opened in 2007 was built next to the 'old bowl' and was designed by Mick Mulhall..

== Transport ==
The major roads that run through or adjoin Five Dock include Great North Road, Parramatta Road, Lyons Road, Queens Road, and Ramsay Road.

Five Dock is approximately a 40-minute commute to the CBD via public transport, on either routes 437, 438X or 502.

Five Dock is connected to the city and surrounding suburbs by Transit Systems-operated bus routes. As of 2020, bus routes that run through or begin/terminate include:

- 406 to Hurlstone Park
- 415 to Chiswick and Campsie
- 437 to City QVB
- 438X and 438N to City Martin Place and Abbotsford
- 490 to Drummoyne and Hurstville
- 491 to Hurstville
- 492 to Drummoyne and Rockdale
- 502 to Cabarita Wharf, Drummoyne and City Town Hall
- 530 to Burwood and Chatswood

=== Proposed Metro Station ===
Five Dock is a future rapid transit station that will be built as part of the Sydney Metro West project, connecting Westmead to the CBD.

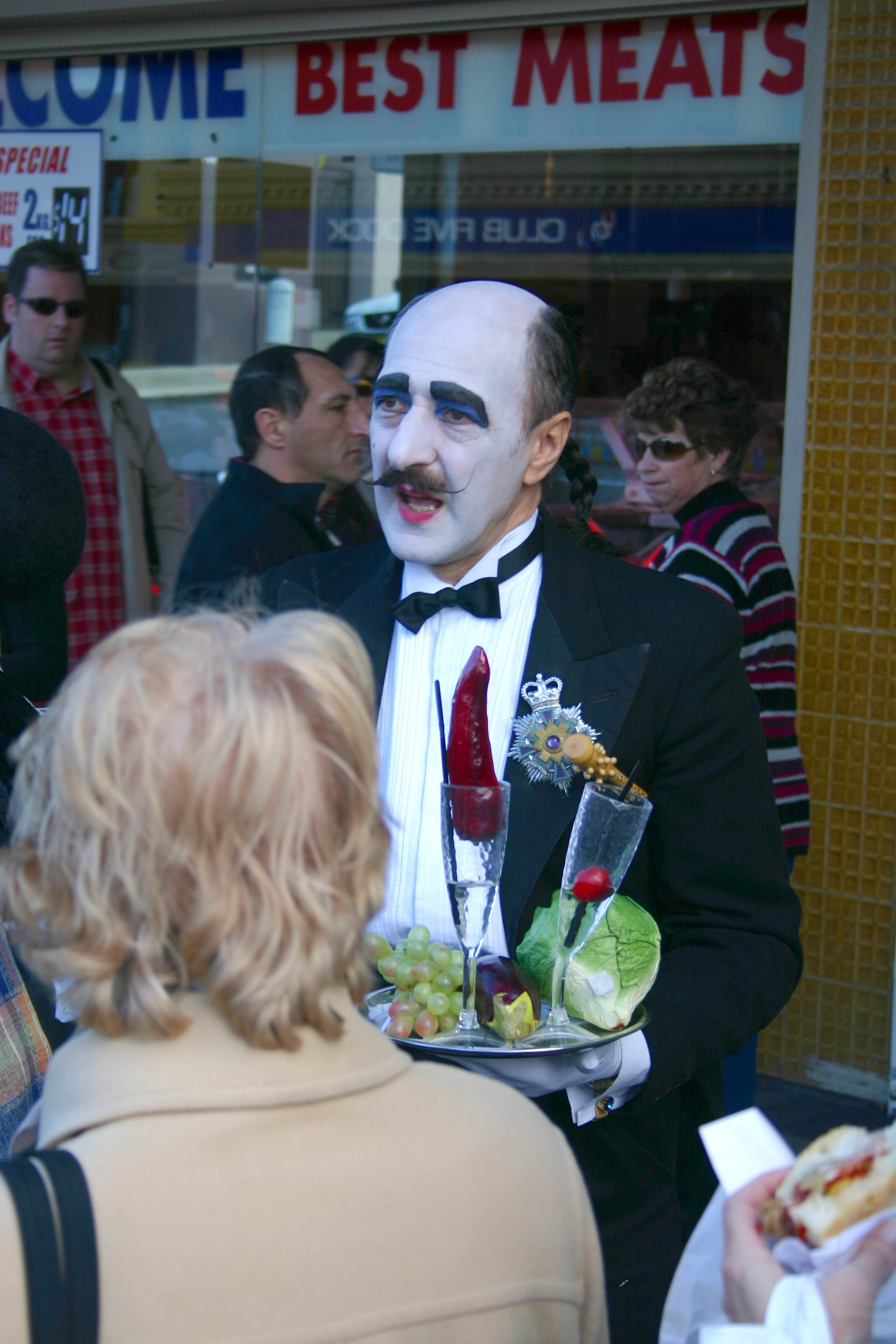
A man in costume at Ferragosto

== Demographics ==
Five Dock is an established suburb with a population of 9,823 in the 2021 census. The most common reported ancestries in Five Dock were Italian 23.5%, Australian 20.9%, English 20.2%, Irish 10.4% and Chinese 9.9%. 63.1% of people were born in Australia; the next most common countries of birth were Italy 7.1%, China (excluding Special Administrative Regions and Taiwan) 3.7%, England 2.7%, New Zealand 1.8%, and Ireland 1.0%. 64.1% of people only spoke English at home; other languages spoken at home included Italian 10.5%, Mandarin 4.0%, Cantonese 2.6%, Spanish 2.0%, and Greek 1.8%. The most common responses for religion were Catholic 41.0%, No Religion 29.7%, Anglican 6.4%, Eastern Orthodox 4.6%; a further 4.4% of respondents elected not to disclose their religion.

Like the nearby suburbs of Haberfield and Leichhardt, Five Dock has a large population of Italian immigrants. This Italian influence is reflected in several ways, for instance in the style of the suburb's restaurants, cafes and delis. Five Dock Public School has had an Italian language teaching program since 1981 and there are local private language schools offering Italian classes. In addition, Five Dock has an annual street festival called Ferragosto, based on the traditional Italian festival of the same name.

== Notable residents ==
- Joe Avati, comedian
- Barbara Brunton, actress
- Kevin Cairns, politician
- Jeff Fenech, (born 1964) boxer.
- Sydney Grange, sports administrator
- Lachlan Ilias, (born 2000) rugby league player
- Samuel Lyons, (1798–1851) an English-born former convict who became a wealthy landowner and prominent Australian citizen, purchasing Five Dock Farm in 1838
- Peter Dodds McCormick, (born in Scotland, (1833–1916) - Waverley, New South Wales) the composer of Australian National anthem, Advance Australia Fair, became headmaster of Five Dock Public School in 1865
- John McMahon, cricketer
- Rex Mossop, (1928–2011) rugby union, rugby league player, and sportscaster
- Duke Tritton, poet and singer

== Politics ==
In the federal parliament, Five Dock is in the Division of Reid, an electoral division which includes the surrounding suburbs of Drummoyne, Concord, Rhodes, Burwood and Strathfield. A Labor seat since its inception in 1922, it elected a Liberal member for the first time in the 2013 federal election, which the Liberal Party held until the 2022 federal election. Since 2022, the current member for Reid is Sally Sitou of the Australian Labor Party.

In the state parliament, Five Dock is in the Electoral district of Drummoyne, which is similar to the federal division but excludes the areas of Burwood and Strathfield. This makes it nominally a Liberal seat, despite suffering a 12% swing in the 2023 state election. Its current member since 2023 is Stephanie Di Pasqua, who is also a councillor on the City of Canada Bay Council.

== Gallery ==
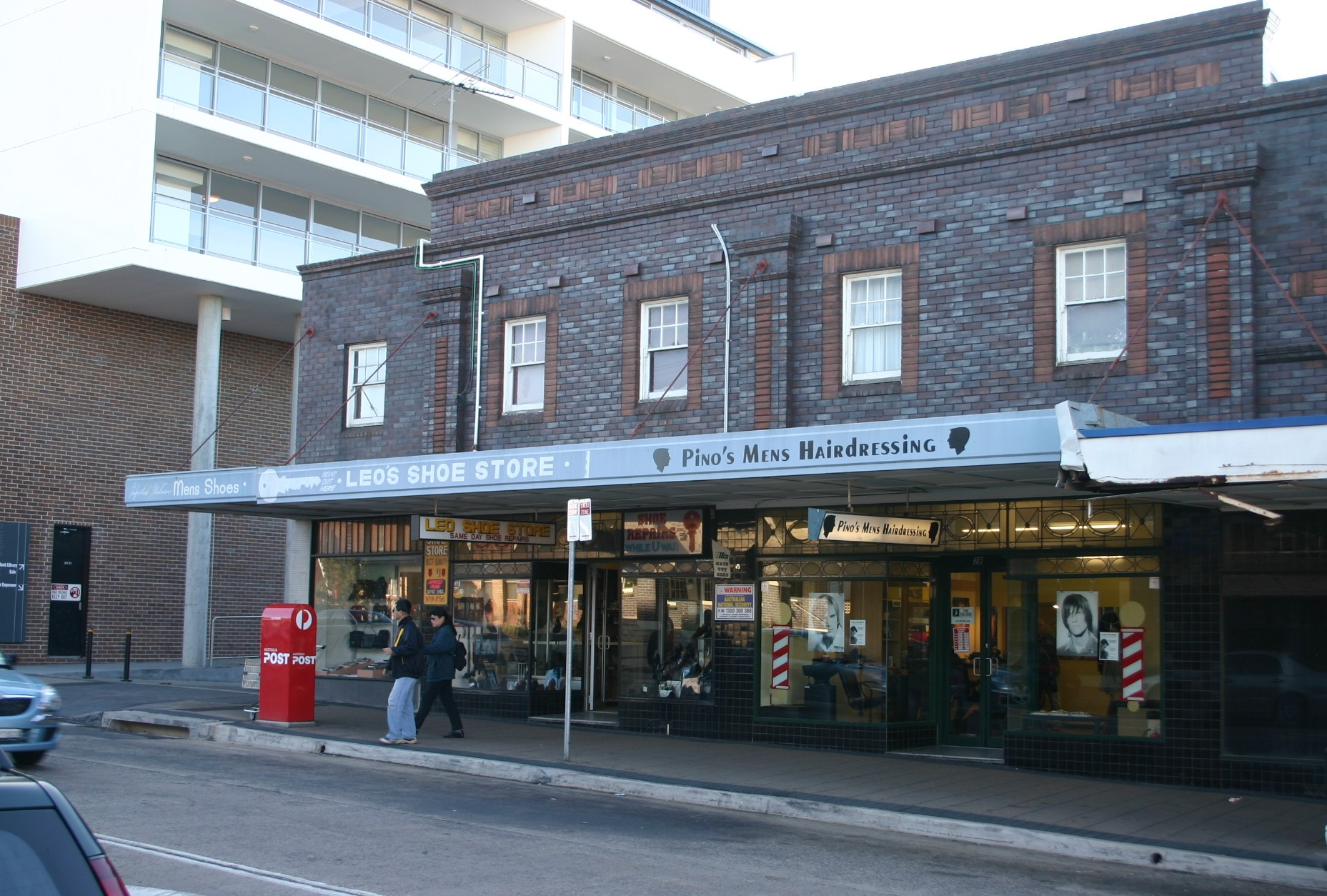
Older style shops on Garfield Street with new development in the background.

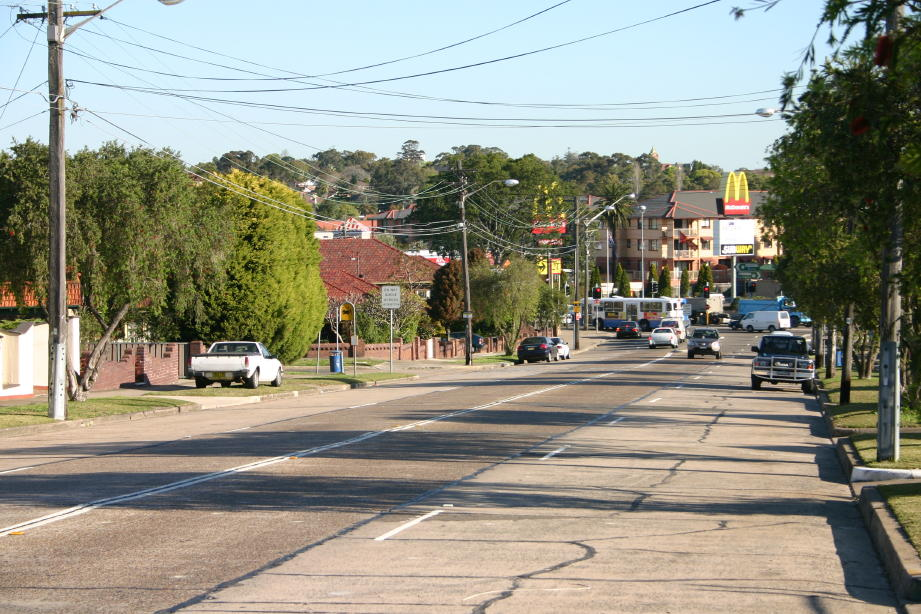
Great North Road, view to Parramatta Road

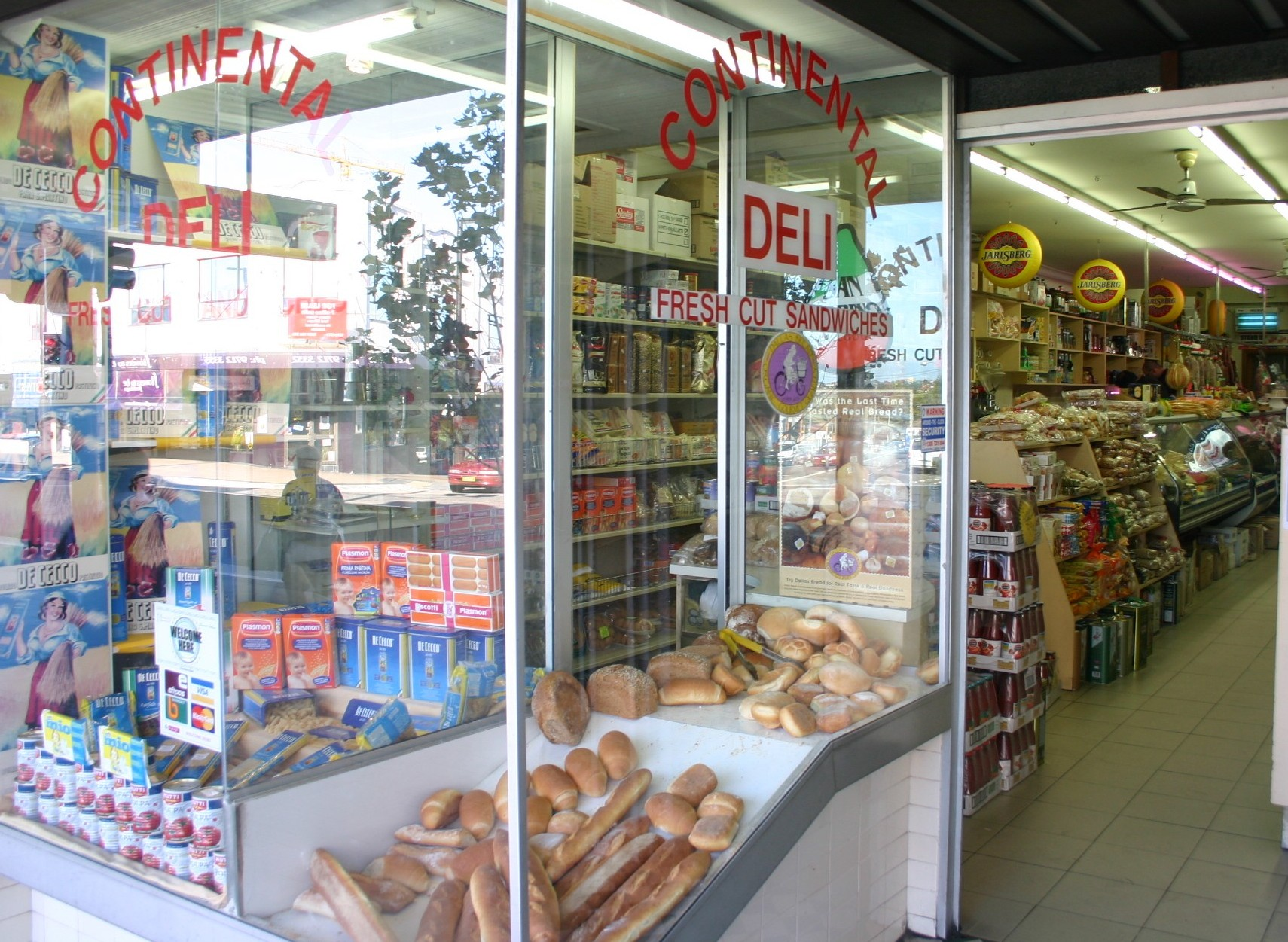
Italian deli on Great North Road

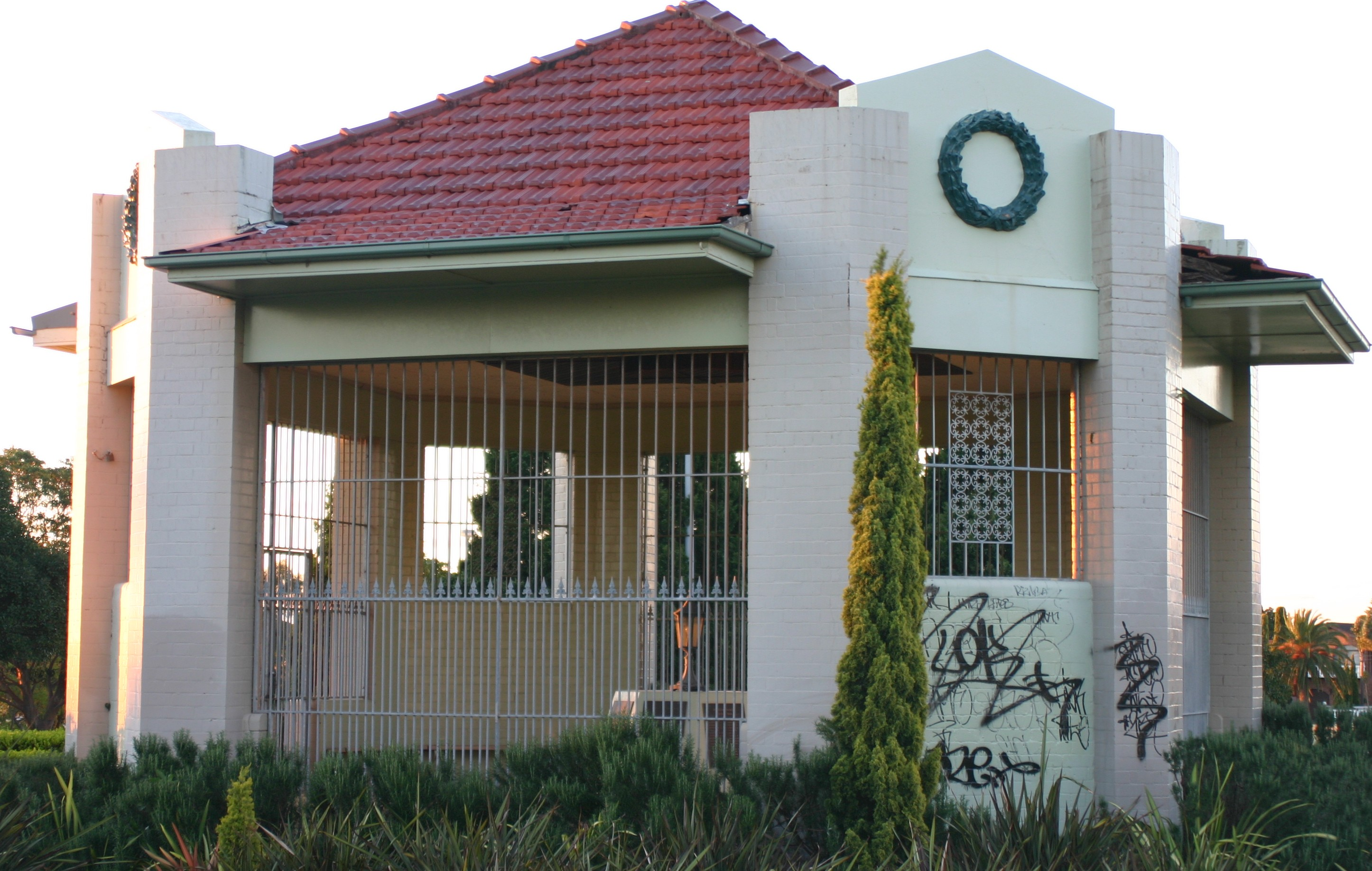
War Memorial in Five Dock Park

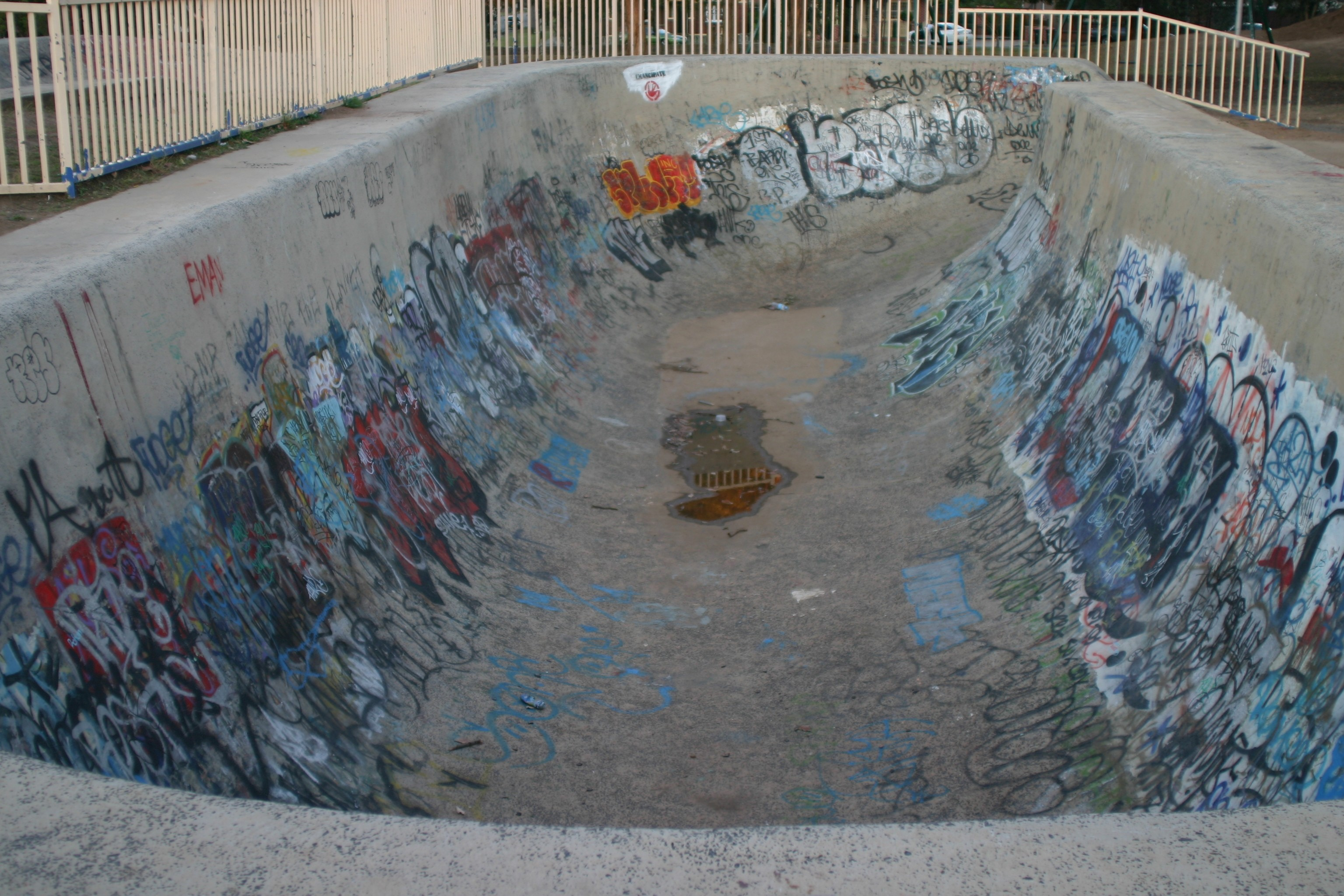
The skate bowl in Five Dock Park

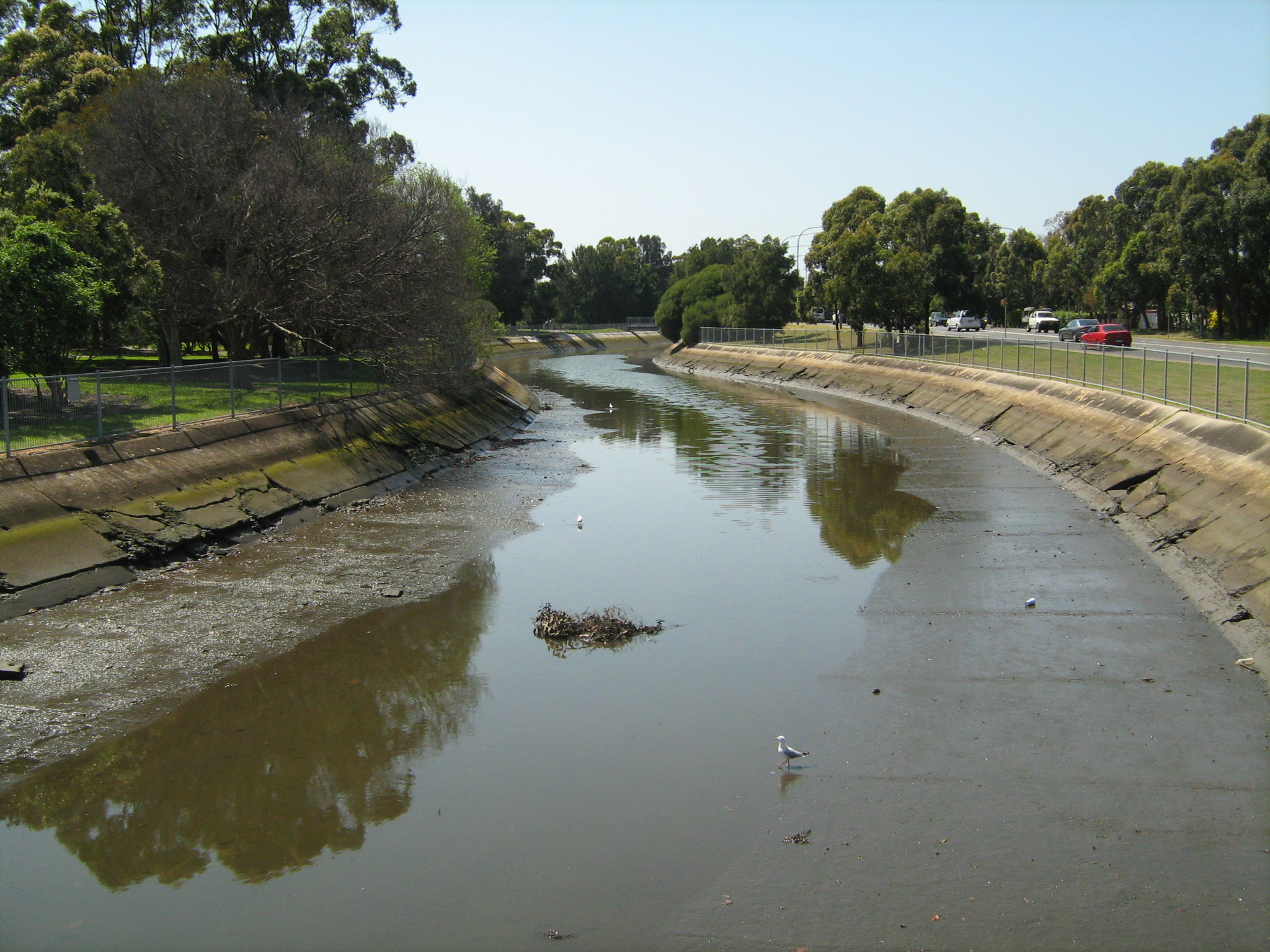
Iron Cove Creek at Timbrell Park

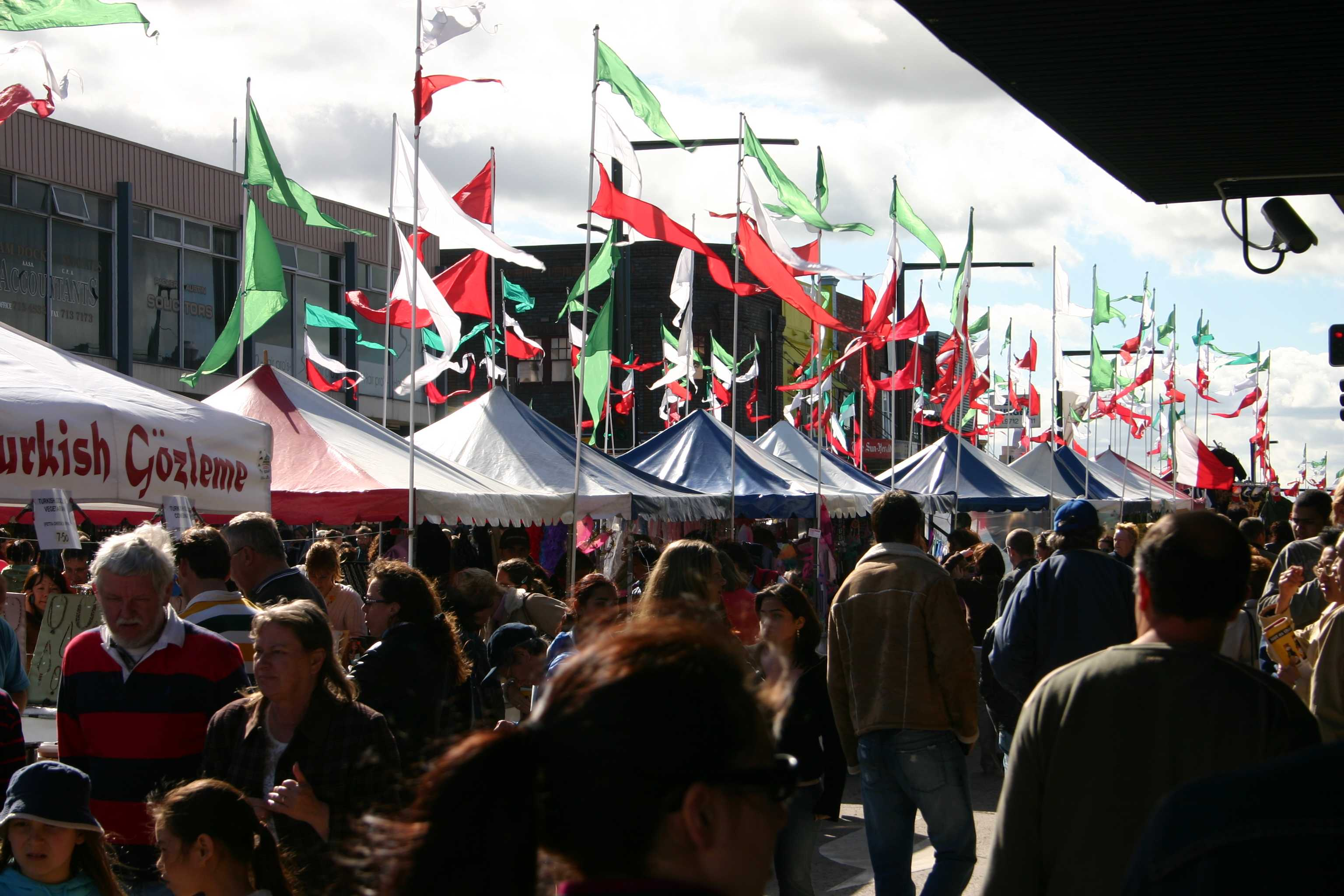
Ferragosto Festival street stalls
