= Electoral results for the district of Drummoyne =

Election results for Drummoyne, New South Wales, Australia

Drummoyne, an electoral district of the Legislative Assembly in the Australian state of New South Wales, has had two incarnations, the first from 1913 to 1920, the second from 1927 to the present.

== Members for Drummoyne ==
First incarnation (1913–1920)
Election	Member	Party
1913	George Richards	Liberal Reform
1916 by	Alexander Graff	Liberal Reform
1917	Alexander Graff	Nationalist
Second incarnation (1927–present)
Election	Member	Party
1927	John Lee	Nationalist
1930	David McLelland	Labor
1932	John Lee	United Australia
1935	John Lee	United Australia
1938	John Lee	United Australia
1941	Robert Greig	Labor
1944	Robert Greig	Labor
1947	Robert Dewley	Liberal
1950	Robert Dewley	Liberal
1953	Roy Jackson	Labor
1956	Walter Lawrence	Liberal
1959	Walter Lawrence	Liberal
1962	Reg Coady	Labor
1965	Reg Coady	Labor
1968	Reg Coady	Labor
1971	Reg Coady	Labor
1973	Michael Maher	Labor
1976	Michael Maher	Labor
1978	Michael Maher	Labor
1981	Michael Maher	Labor
1982 by	John Murray	Labor
1984	John Murray	Labor
1988	John Murray	Labor
1991	John Murray	Labor
1995	John Murray	Labor
1999	John Murray	Labor
2003	Angela D'Amore	Labor
2007	Angela D'Amore	Labor
2011	John Sidoti	Liberal
2015	John Sidoti	Liberal
2019	John Sidoti	Liberal
2023	Stephanie Di Pasqua	Liberal

== Election results ==
=== Elections in the 2020s ===
==== 2023 ====
2023 New South Wales state election: Drummoyne
Party	Candidate	Votes	%	±%
Liberal	Stephanie Di Pasqua	24,526	47.5	−10.0
Labor	Julia Little	20,182	39.1	+12.5
Greens	Charles Jago	5,149	10.0	+0.6
Sustainable Australia	Patrick Conaghan	1,782	3.5	+3.5
Total formal votes		51,639	97.8	+0.1
Informal votes		1,177	2.2	−0.1
Turnout		52,816	89.6	−0.2
Two-party-preferred result
Liberal	Stephanie Di Pasqua	25,308	51.3	−12.3
Labor	Julia Little	24,023	48.7	+12.3
Liberal hold		Swing	−12.3	

The incumbent member, John Sidoti, was sacked from the Liberal Party and sat as an independent, before being suspended from Parliament. Sidoti did not contest the seat and the Liberal candidate (Stephanie Di Pasqua) subsequently regained the seat.

=== Elections in the 2010s ===
==== 2019 ====
2019 New South Wales state election: Drummoyne
Party	Candidate	Votes	%	±%
Liberal	John Sidoti	27,922	58.83	−2.28
Labor	Tom Hore	12,012	25.31	+1.60
Greens	Charles Jago	4,461	9.40	−1.58
Keep Sydney Open	David Roberts	1,781	3.75	+3.75
Animal Justice	Maurice Saidi	1,288	2.71	+2.71
Total formal votes		47,464	97.73	+0.23
Informal votes		1,102	2.27	−0.23
Turnout		48,566	89.99	−1.59
Two-party-preferred result
Liberal	John Sidoti	28,878	65.00	−3.78
Labor	Tom Hore	15,552	35.00	+3.78
Liberal hold		Swing	−3.78	

==== 2015 ====
2015 New South Wales state election: Drummoyne
Party	Candidate	Votes	%	±%
Liberal	John Sidoti	28,616	61.1	+4.5
Labor	Jason Khoury	11,103	23.7	−1.1
Greens	Alice Mantel	5,141	11.0	+1.2
No Land Tax	Pat Di Cosmo	716	1.5	+1.5
Christian Democrats	Isabelle Zafirian	706	1.5	−0.5
Outdoor Recreation	Leon Belgrave	544	1.2	+1.2
Total formal votes		46,826	97.5	+0.6
Informal votes		1,200	2.5	−0.6
Turnout		48,026	91.6	+2.9
Two-party-preferred result
Liberal	John Sidoti	29,668	68.8	+1.7
Labor	Jason Khoury	13,468	31.2	−1.7
Liberal hold		Swing	+1.7	

==== 2011 ====
2011 New South Wales state election: Drummoyne
Party	Candidate	Votes	%	±%
Liberal	John Sidoti	26,397	56.0	+19.4
Labor	Angelo Tsirekas	11,872	25.2	−22.1
Greens	Adam Butler	4,624	9.8	+0.4
Hatton's Independent Team	Alex Elliott	3,182	6.8	+6.8
Christian Democrats	Marc Gesling	1,042	2.2	+2.2
Total formal votes		47,117	97.5	+0.2
Informal votes		1,226	2.5	−0.2
Turnout		48,343	93.5	
Two-party-preferred result
Liberal	John Sidoti	28,349	66.7	+24.3
Labor	Angelo Tsirekas	14,183	33.3	−24.3
Liberal gain from Labor		Swing	+24.3	

=== Elections in the 2000s ===
==== 2007 ====
2007 New South Wales state election: Drummoyne
Party	Candidate	Votes	%	±%
Labor	Angela D'Amore	20,007	47.3	−0.1
Liberal	Greg Long	15,519	36.7	+1.4
Greens	Bernard Rooney	3,995	9.4	+0.8
Independent	Michael Vescio	1,258	3.0	+3.0
Unity	Ozlem Huseyin	694	1.6	+0.1
Against Further Immigration	Edeltraud Guener	475	1.1	+0.2
Outdoor Recreation	Peter Stitt	391	0.9	+0.9
Total formal votes		42,339	97.3	−0.1
Informal votes		1,194	2.7	+0.1
Turnout		43,533	93.3	
Two-party-preferred result
Labor	Angela D'Amore	22,509	57.6	−1.1
Liberal	Greg Long	16,559	42.4	+1.1
Labor hold		Swing	−1.1	

==== 2003 ====
2003 New South Wales state election: Drummoyne
Party	Candidate	Votes	%	±%
Labor	Angela D'Amore	20,620	47.2	+1.3
Liberal	Greg Long	15,328	35.1	+2.5
Greens	Mersina Soulos	3,951	9.1	+4.7
Independent	Michael Wroblewski	1,323	3.0	+3.0
Unity	Tina Turrisi	625	1.4	+1.4
Independent	Salvatore Scevola	584	1.3	+1.3
Democrats	Andrew Blake	567	1.3	−3.1
Against Further Immigration	Alexander Pini	376	0.9	+0.2
Independent	Stephen Muller	162	0.4	+0.4
	Stephen Bathgate	118	0.3	+0.3
Total formal votes		43,654	97.3	+0.4
Informal votes		1,225	2.7	−0.4
Turnout		44,879	92.1	
Two-party-preferred result
Labor	Angela D'Amore	23,041	58.7	−0.7
Liberal	Greg Long	16,178	41.3	+0.7
Labor hold		Swing	−0.7	

=== Elections in the 1990s ===
==== 1999 ====
1999 New South Wales state election: Drummoyne
Party	Candidate	Votes	%	±%
Labor	John Murray	19,253	46.6	+6.2
Liberal	Peter Phelps	13,475	32.6	−6.0
Independent	Stephen Lesslie	2,357	5.7	+5.7
Greens	Therese Doyle	1,807	4.4	−2.1
Democrats	Cameron Andrews	1,806	4.4	+4.1
One Nation	John Ferguson	1,679	4.1	+4.1
Independent	Jennifer Paull	638	1.5	+1.5
Against Further Immigration	Tony Mavin	286	0.7	+0.7
Total formal votes		41,301	96.9	+1.4
Informal votes		1,325	3.1	−1.4
Turnout		42,626	93.7	
Two-party-preferred result
Labor	John Murray	22,118	59.4	+6.7
Liberal	Peter Phelps	15,117	40.6	−6.7
Labor hold		Swing	+6.7	

==== 1995 ====
1995 New South Wales state election: Drummoyne
Party	Candidate	Votes	%	±%
Labor	John Murray	14,020	40.9	−6.2
Liberal	Michael Megna	13,542	39.5	−2.9
No Aircraft Noise	Lew Hird	3,942	11.5	+11.5
Greens	Jenny Ryde	2,297	6.7	+2.3
Call to Australia	Robert Marotta	445	1.3	+1.3
Total formal votes		34,246	95.8	+3.7
Informal votes		1,493	4.2	−3.7
Turnout		35,739	94.1	
Two-party-preferred result
Labor	John Murray	16,680	52.2	−1.4
Liberal	Michael Megna	15,274	47.8	+1.4
Labor hold		Swing	−1.4	

==== 1991 ====
1991 New South Wales state election: Drummoyne
Party	Candidate	Votes	%	±%
Labor	John Murray	15,185	47.1	+6.6
Liberal	Michael Cantali	13,688	42.5	−2.3
Greens	Bruce Threlfo	1,416	4.4	+4.4
Independent	Gillian Lewis	816	2.5	+2.5
Democrats	Julien Droulers	761	2.4	−0.5
Independent	Robert Maddrell	364	1.1	+1.1
Total formal votes		32,230	92.1	−4.0
Informal votes		2,747	7.9	+4.0
Turnout		34,977	93.4	
Two-party-preferred result
Labor	John Murray	16,660	53.6	+4.3
Liberal	Michael Cantali	14,419	46.4	−4.3
Labor notional gain from Liberal		Swing	+4.3	

Drummoyne became a notional Liberal seat as a result of the 1990 redistribution, however John Murray (Laborr) retained the seat with an increased margin.

=== Elections in the 1980s ===
==== 1988 ====
1988 New South Wales state election: Drummoyne
Party	Candidate	Votes	%	±%
Labor	John Murray	12,406	41.6	−17.3
Liberal	Janis Kleinig	12,367	41.4	+0.4
Independent	Peter Woods	2,460	8.2	+8.2
Independent	Jane Adam	2,033	6.8	+6.8
Democrats	James Farrell	433	1.5	+1.4
Independent	Peter Gronow	158	0.5	+0.5
Total formal votes		29,857	95.9	−0.9
Informal votes		1,276	4.1	+0.9
Turnout		31,133	95.0	
Two-party-preferred result
Labor	John Murray	14,403	52.1	−6.8
Liberal	Janis Kleinig	13,265	47.9	+6.8
Labor hold		Swing	−6.8	

==== 1984 ====
1984 New South Wales state election: Drummoyne
Party	Candidate	Votes	%	±%
Labor	John Murray	17,002	59.0	−10.2
Liberal	Ben Sonego	11,802	41.0	+17.0
Total formal votes		28,804	96.8	+0.8
Informal votes		953	3.2	−0.8
Turnout		29,757	93.4	+1.8
Labor hold		Swing	−14.8	

==== 1982 by-election ====
1982 Drummoyne by-election Saturday 17 April
Party	Candidate	Votes	%	±%
Labor	John Murray	14,449	55.74	−13.46
Liberal	John Booth	9,725	37.52	+13.52
Call to Australia	John Grifiths	1,433	5.53	
Independent	Nick Jones	314	1.21	
Total formal votes		25,921	97.70	+1.70
Informal votes		610	2.30	−1.70
Turnout		26,531	82.50	−9.06
Labor hold		Swing	−13.46	

Michael Maher (Labor) resigned.

==== 1981 ====
1981 New South Wales state election: Drummoyne
Party	Candidate	Votes	%	±%
Labor	Michael Maher	19,139	69.2	+0.3
Liberal	Sarah Hewson	6,635	24.0	−7.1
Democrats	Peter Nelson	1,869	6.8	+6.8
Total formal votes		27,643	96.0	
Informal votes		1,137	4.0	
Turnout		28,780	91.6	
Two-party-preferred result
Labor	Michael Maher	20,139	73.8	+4.9
Liberal	Sarah Hewson	7,135	26.2	−4.9
Labor hold		Swing	+4.9	

=== Elections in the 1970s ===
==== 1978 ====
1978 New South Wales state election: Drummoyne
Party	Candidate	Votes	%	±%
Labor	Michael Maher	19,883	68.9	+12.6
Liberal	William Rowlings	8,974	31.1	−9.3
Total formal votes		28,857	97.0	−1.2
Informal votes		887	3.0	+1.2
Turnout		29,744	92.6	−1.0
Labor hold		Swing	+11.6	

==== 1976 ====
1976 New South Wales state election: Drummoyne
Party	Candidate	Votes	%	±%
Labor	Michael Maher	16,483	56.3	+6.5
Liberal	James Reid	11,843	40.5	−4.6
Workers	Hugh Frazer	949	3.2	+3.2
Total formal votes		29,275	98.2	+1.2
Informal votes		520	1.8	−1.2
Turnout		29,795	93.6	−0.3
Two-party-preferred result
Labor	Michael Maher	16,768	57.3	+6.6
Liberal	James Reid	12,507	42.7	−6.6
Labor hold		Swing	+6.6	

==== 1973 ====
1973 New South Wales state election: Drummoyne
Party	Candidate	Votes	%	±%
Labor	Michael Maher	13,701	49.8	−7.2
Liberal	Brian Barber	12,419	45.1	+2.1
Democratic Labor	Vincent Abrams	1,402	5.1	+5.1
Total formal votes		27,522	97.0	
Informal votes		841	3.0	
Turnout		28,363	93.9	
Two-party-preferred result
Labor	Michael Maher	13,950	50.7	−6.3
Liberal	Brian Barber	13,572	49.3	+6.3
Labor hold		Swing	−6.3	

==== 1971 ====
1971 New South Wales state election: Drummoyne
Party	Candidate	Votes	%	±%
Labor	Reg Coady	14,198	57.0	+7.5
Liberal	Colin Gardiner	10,700	43.0	−3.2
Total formal votes		24,898	97.4	
Informal votes		675	2.6	
Turnout		25,573	93.7	
Labor hold		Swing	+5.3	

=== Elections in the 1960s ===
==== 1968 ====
1968 New South Wales state election: Drummoyne
Party	Candidate	Votes	%	±%
Labor	Reg Coady	12,479	49.5	
Liberal	John Howard	11,659	46.2	
Democratic Labor	Mick Carroll	1,089	4.3	
Total formal votes		25,227	96.9	
Informal votes		800	3.1	
Turnout		26,027	94.3	
Two-party-preferred result
Labor	Reg Coady	13,033	51.7	+4.7
Liberal	John Howard	12,194	48.3	−4.7
Labor notional gain from Liberal		Swing	+4.7	

- Drummoyne became a notionally Liberal seat in the redistribution.

==== 1965 ====
1965 New South Wales state election: Drummoyne
Party	Candidate	Votes	%	±%
Labor	Reg Coady	11,599	50.8	−2.0
Liberal	George Chambers	10,185	44.6	−2.6
Democratic Labor	Edwin Carr	1,062	4.6	+4.6
Total formal votes		22,846	97.8	−0.8
Informal votes		501	2.2	+0.8
Turnout		23,347	93.7	+0.1
Two-party-preferred result
Labor	Reg Coady	11,811	51.7	−1.1
Liberal	George Chambers	11,035	48.3	+1.1
Labor hold		Swing	−1.1	

==== 1962 ====
1962 New South Wales state election: Drummoyne
Party	Candidate	Votes	%	±%
Labor	Reg Coady	12,510	52.8	+1.3
Liberal	Walter Lawrence	11,191	47.2	−1.3
Total formal votes		23,701	98.6	
Informal votes		344	1.4	
Turnout		24,045	93.6	
Labor gain from Liberal		Swing	+1.3	

- Drummoyne became a notional Labor seat in the redistribution.

=== Elections in the 1950s ===
==== 1959 ====
1959 New South Wales state election: Drummoyne
Party	Candidate	Votes	%	±%
Liberal	Walter Lawrence	12,170	52.2	
Labor	Roy Jackson	11,147	47.8	
Total formal votes		23,317	98.4	
Informal votes		373	1.6	
Turnout		23,690	94.6	
Liberal hold		Swing		

==== 1956 ====
1956 New South Wales state election: Drummoyne
Party	Candidate	Votes	%	±%
Liberal	Walter Lawrence	10,881	51.3	+3.4
Labor	Roy Jackson	10,316	48.7	−3.4
Total formal votes		21,197	98.3	+0.3
Informal votes		360	1.7	−0.3
Turnout		21,557	95.0	0.0
Liberal gain from Labor		Swing	+3.4	

==== 1953 ====
1953 New South Wales state election: Drummoyne
Party	Candidate	Votes	%	±%
Labor	Roy Jackson	11,551	52.1	
Liberal	Robert Dewley	10,622	47.9	
Total formal votes		22,173	98.0	
Informal votes		443	2.0	
Turnout		22,616	95.0	
Labor gain from Liberal		Swing		

==== 1950 ====
1950 New South Wales state election: Drummoyne
Party	Candidate	Votes	%	±%
Liberal	Robert Dewley	11,402	54.0	
Labor	Charles Halliday	9,707	46.0	
Total formal votes		21,109	98.5	
Informal votes		319	1.5	
Turnout		21,428	94.8	
Liberal hold		Swing		

=== Elections in the 1940s ===
==== 1947 ====
1947 New South Wales state election: Drummoyne
Party	Candidate	Votes	%	±%
Liberal	Robert Dewley	11,255	51.6	+17.0
Labor	Robert Greig	10,561	48.4	+5.4
Total formal votes		21,816	98.5	+1.8
Informal votes		322	1.5	−1.8
Turnout		22,138	95.5	+1.9
Liberal gain from Labor		Swing	+9.8	

==== 1944 ====
1944 New South Wales state election: Drummoyne
Party	Candidate	Votes	%	±%
Labor	Robert Greig	8,489	43.0	−0.4
Democratic	Russell Newton	6,831	34.6	−9.9
Lang Labor	George Drummond	2,791	14.1	+14.1
Liberal Democratic	William Adkins	1,625	8.2	+8.2
Total formal votes		19,736	96.7	−1.6
Informal votes		668	3.3	+1.6
Turnout		20,404	93.6	−0.2
Two-party-preferred result
Labor	Robert Greig	11,493	58.2	+4.8
Democratic	Russell Newton	8,243	41.8	−4.8
Labor hold		Swing	+4.8	

==== 1941 ====
1941 New South Wales state election: Drummoyne
Party	Candidate	Votes	%	±%
United Australia	John Lee	8,693	44.5	
Labor	Robert Greig	8,477	43.4	
State Labor	William Wood	2,367	12.1	
Total formal votes		19,537	98.3	
Informal votes		335	1.7	
Turnout		19,872	93.8	
Two-party-preferred result
Labor	Robert Greig	10,429	53.4	
United Australia	John Lee	9,108	46.6	
Labor gain from United Australia		Swing		

=== Elections in the 1930s ===
==== 1938 ====
1938 New South Wales state election: Drummoyne
Party	Candidate	Votes	%	±%
United Australia	John Lee	11,299	60.1	+0.1
Labor	Ray Maher	7,497	39.9	−0.1
Total formal votes		18,796	97.8	+0.3
Informal votes		429	2.2	−0.3
Turnout		19,225	96.6	−0.8
United Australia hold		Swing	+0.1	

==== 1935 ====
1935 New South Wales state election: Drummoyne
Party	Candidate	Votes	%	±%
United Australia	John Lee	10,803	60.0	+16.4
Labor (NSW)	Michael Croot	7,186	40.0	+4.6
Total formal votes		17,989	97.5	−0.1
Informal votes		458	2.5	+0.1
Turnout		18,447	97.4	+0.2
United Australia hold		Swing	+0.5	

==== 1932 ====
1932 New South Wales state election: Drummoyne
Party	Candidate	Votes	%	±%
United Australia	John Lee	7,786	43.6	−0.4
Labor (NSW)	David McLelland	6,324	35.4	−20.6
Ind. United Australia	William Udall	2,589	14.5	+14.5
Federal Labor	Algernon Lindsay	896	5.0	+5.0
Women's	Ruby Duncan	139	0.8	+0.8
Communist	Bernard Burns	115	0.6	+0.6
Two-party-preferred result
United Australia	John Lee	10,616	59.5	+15.5
Labor (NSW)	David McLelland	7,233	40.5	−15.5
United Australia gain from Labor (NSW)		Swing	+15.5	

==== 1930 ====
1930 New South Wales state election: Drummoyne
Party	Candidate	Votes	%	±%
Labor	David McLelland	9,887	56.0	
Nationalist	John Lee (defeated)	7,774	44.0	
Total formal votes		17,661	99.0	
Informal votes		179	1.0	
Turnout		17,840	96.8	
Labor gain from Nationalist		Swing		

=== Elections in the 1920s ===
==== 1927 ====
1927 New South Wales state election: Drummoyne
Party	Candidate	Votes	%	±%
Nationalist	John Lee	6,174	41.9	
Labor	David McLelland	5,507	37.4	
Independent	William Gray	3,049	20.7	
Total formal votes		14,730	98.8	
Informal votes		171	1.2	
Turnout		14,901	86.9	
Two-party-preferred result
Nationalist	John Lee	8,689	60.5	
Labor	David McLelland	5,663	39.5	
Nationalist win		(new seat)		

==== 1920 - 1927 ====
District abolished

=== Elections in the 1910s ===
==== 1917 ====
This section is an excerpt from 1917 New South Wales state election § Drummoyne

1917 New South Wales state election: Drummoyne
Party	Candidate	Votes	%	±%
Nationalist	Alexander Graff	6,404	66.2	+10.0
Labor	Bertie Sheiles	3,238	33.5	−4.9
Independent	Walter Kirkaldy	35	0.4	+0.4
Total formal votes		9,677	98.8	+1.0
Informal votes		120	1.2	−1.0
Turnout		9,797	62.3	−8.3
Nationalist hold		Swing	+2.2	

==== 1916 by-election ====
1916 Drummoyne by-election Saturday 22 January
Party	Candidate	Votes	%	±%
Liberal Reform	Alexander Graff	3,101	47.32	
National Progressive	Frederick Parish	1,392	21.24	
Independent Liberal	Frank Farnell	1,152	17.58	
Women's League	William Begg	829	12.65	
Independent Democrat	Patrick Craddock	70	1.07	
Independent Democrat	John Bell	8	0.14	
Total formal votes		6,553	100.00	
Informal votes		0	0.00	
Turnout		6,553	47.49	

A second ballot was necessary because Alexander Graff failed, by 176 votes, to win an absolute majority. The Sydney Morning Herald attributed the lack of majority to Frank Farnell splitting the Liberal vote.

1916 Drummoyne by-election - Second Round Saturday 29 January
Party	Candidate	Votes	%	±%
Liberal Reform	Alexander Graff	4,382	56.06	
National Progressive	Frederick Parish	3,435	43.94	
Total formal votes		7,817	99.52	
Informal votes		38	0.48	
Turnout		7,855	56.92	
Liberal Reform hold		Swing		

George Richards Liberal Reform died.

==== 1913 ====
This section is an excerpt from 1913 New South Wales state election § Drummoyne

1913 New South Wales state election: Drummoyne
Party	Candidate	Votes	%	±%
Liberal Reform	George Richards	5,035	56.2	
Labor	John Mudie	3,439	38.4	
National Progressive	Henry McDicken	411	4.6	
Independent	Henry Johnson	81	0.9	
Total formal votes		8,966	97.8	
Informal votes		204	2.2	
Turnout		9,170	70.6	
Liberal Reform win		(new seat)		
