= 1916 Drummoyne state by-election =

- 22 January 1916 (first round); 29 January 1916 (second round)

Electoral district of Drummoyne in the New South Wales Legislative Assembly
- Registered: 13,800
- Turnout: 56.92% (▼13.71) (second round)
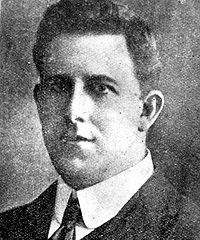

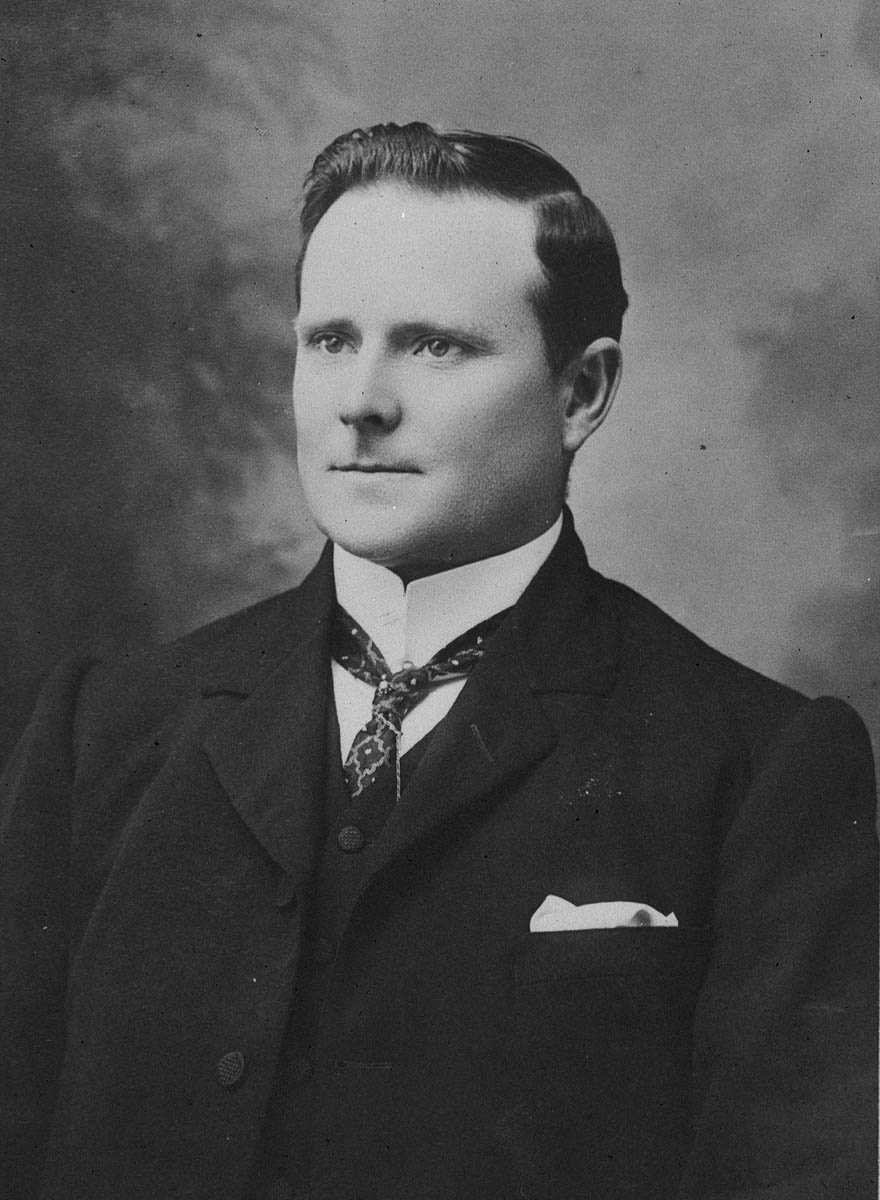

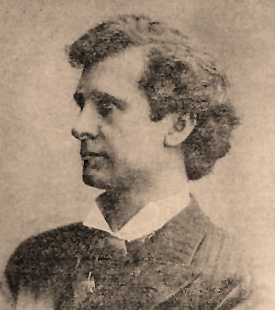
| | First party | Second party |
|---|---|---|
| | | NPP |
| Candidate | Alexander Graff | Frederick Parish |
| Party | Liberal Reform | Nat Progressive |
| 1st round | 3,101 | 1,392 |
| Percentage | 47.32% | 21.24% |
| Swing | ▲8.84 | ▲16.66 |
| 2nd round | 4,382 | 3,435 |
| Percentage | 56.06% | 43.94% |
| | Third party | Fourth party |
| Candidate | Frank Farnell | William Begg |
| Party | Ind. Liberal | Women's League |
| 1st round | 1,152 | 829 |
| Percentage | 17.58% | 12.65% |
| Swing | ▲17.58 | ▲12.65 |
MP before election
George Richards
Liberal Reform
Elected MP
Alexander Graff
Liberal Reform

The 1916 Drummoyne state by-election was held on 22 January 1916 to elect the member for Drummoyne in the New South Wales Legislative Assembly, following the death of Liberal Reform MP George Richards.

The by-election resulted in Liberal Reform candidate Alexander Graff finishing in first place with 47.32% of the vote, followed by National Progressive candidate Frederick Parish on 21.24%. Because no candidate had received an absolute majority, a second round of voting was held one week later on 29 January 1962, which Graff won.

== Key dates ==
- 3 January 1916 – Writ of election issued by the Speaker of the Legislative Assembly
- 10 January 1916 – Candidate nominations
- 22 January 1916 – Polling day
- 29 January 1916 – Second round
- 7 February 1916 – Return of writ

== Results ==
1916 Drummoyne state by-election
| Party | Candidate | Votes | % | ±% |
|---|---|---|---|---|
| Liberal Reform | Alexander Graff | 3,101 | 47.32 | +8.84 |
| National Progressive | Frederick Parish | 1,392 | 21.24 | +16.66 |
| Independent Liberal | Frank Farnell | 1,152 | 17.58 | +17.58 |
| Women's League | William Begg | 829 | 12.65 | +12.65 |
| Independent Democrat | Patrick Craddock | 70 | 1.07 | +1.07 |
| Independent Democrat | John Bell | 8 | 0.14 | +0.14 |
| Total formal votes | | 6,553 | – | |
| Informal votes | | – | – | |
| Turnout | | 6,553 | 47.49 | –23.14 |
Second round result
| Liberal Reform | Alexander Graff | 4,382 | 56.06 | N/A |
| National Progressive | Frederick Parish | 3,435 | 43.94 | N/A |
| Total formal votes | | 7,817 | 99.52 | +1.74 |
| Informal votes | | 38 | 0.48 | –1.74 |
| Turnout | | 7,855 | 56.92 | –13.71 |
| Liberal Reform hold | | | | |

== See also ==
- Electoral results for the district of Drummoyne
- List of New South Wales state by-elections
