= 1982 Drummoyne state by-election =

Election result for Drummoyne, New South Wales, Australia

A by-election was held for the New South Wales Legislative Assembly seat of Drummoyne on 17 April 1982. It was triggered by the resignation of sitting Labor MP Michael Maher to contest the federal seat of Lowe at the 1982 by-election.

== Dates ==
Date	Event
26 January 1982	Michael Maher resigned.
13 March 1982	Lowe by-election
15 March 1982	Writ of election issued by the Speaker of the Legislative Assembly and close of electoral rolls.
25 March 1982	Day of nomination
17 April 1982	Polling day
7 May 1982	Return of writ

== Results ==
1982 Drummoyne by-election Saturday 17 April
Party	Candidate	Votes	%	±%
Labor	John Murray	14,449	55.74	−13.46
Liberal	John Booth	9,725	37.52	+13.52
Call to Australia	John Grifiths	1,433	5.53	
Independent	Nick Jones	314	1.21	
Total formal votes		25,921	97.70	+1.70
Informal votes		610	2.30	−1.70
Turnout		26,531	82.50	−9.06
Labor hold		Swing	−13.46	

== See also ==
- Electoral results for the district of Drummoyne
- List of New South Wales state by-elections
