= Lena Gustin =

Italian-Australian broadcaster (1914–2003)

Lena Gustin MBE, Commendatore
- Born: Maria Maddalena Morelli; 9 July 1914; Azzone, Bergamo, Italy
- Died: 21 September 2003 (aged 89); Sydney, Australia
- Occupations: Radio broadcaster, journalist, community leader
- Known for: Mamma Lena radio program
- Spouse: Dino Gustin (m. 1940–2003)
- Children: 3
- Awards: MBE (1968); Cavaliere (1967); Commendatore (1999); Centenary Medal (2001)

Maria Maddalena "Lena" Gustin MBE (née Morelli; 9 July 1914 – 21 September 2003), widely known as her radio persona Mamma Lena, was an Italian-Australian radio broadcaster, journalist and community leader. She is regarded as a pioneer of foreign-language broadcasting in Australia and was often referred to as "Mamma degli italiani" (Mother of the Italians) for her work assisting post-war migrants in Sydney.

== Early life and migration ==
Maria Maddalena Morelli was born on 9 July 1914 in Azzone, in the province of Bergamo, Italy. She obtained a degree in languages from the Ca' Foscari University of Venice.

In 1940, she married Dino Gustin (1919–2004), a journalist from Trieste. Their firstborn son, Alberto, died of meningitis at the age of four during World War II. In 1956, the family, including children Rosalba and Roberto, migrated to Australia aboard the ship Aurelia, arriving in Sydney on 22 May.

== Career ==
Upon arriving in Australia, Gustin worked in a café and later as a typist for the Capuchin friars in Leichhardt, despite her prior academic qualifications. Her media career began with the Italian-language newspaper La Fiamma, where she wrote advice columns including "Il Salotto di Lena" (Lena's Salon) and "Lena Risponde" (Lena Replies).

=== Radio broadcasting ===
In the late 1950s, Gustin began presenting The Italian Hour on radio station 2SM at the invitation of Father Atanasio of the Capuchin friars. Her broadcasting career spanned over two decades, moving to station 2CH (1959–1973) and later 2KY (1973–1980).

From September 1980 to 1985, Gustin continued her Italian-language programming on the community radio station 2SER, broadcasting from the University of Technology Sydney.

Gustin's programs served as a source of information for the Italian community regarding employment, housing, and social integration during a period of limited government assistance for migrants. Her husband, Dino Gustin, served as the program's producer, transcribing news from Italy via shortwave radio (RAI) daily at 4:00 am for broadcast.

=== Public service and political activity ===
In 1978, Gustin was appointed by Prime Minister Malcolm Fraser to the newly created National Women's Advisory Council, where she served until 1982. She was the only migrant woman appointed to the council at that time.

In 1982, Gustin stood as an independent candidate for the Federal seat of Lowe in the by-election triggered by the resignation of Sir William McMahon. She was unsuccessful, receiving 116 votes (0.2%), and the seat was won by Michael Maher.

== Philanthropy and community work ==
Through her radio platform, Gustin and her husband organised charitable initiatives. Listeners often sent donations which were used to fund community projects. Notable contributions included raising funds for the construction of a childcare centre in Fairfield and organising disaster relief for the Vajont Dam disaster, the 1966 Florence flood, and earthquakes in Friuli and Sicily.

== Legacy ==
The Mamma Lena & Dino Gustin Foundation was established to maintain the couple's charitable work. The foundation supports projects such as water infrastructure in Nigeria and educational resources in Zambia, and aims to preserve the history of Italian migration to Australia.

The foundation funded the establishment of the Mamma Lena and Dino Gustin Innovation Centre at the Co.As.It. Italian Bilingual School in Sydney.

== Honours and awards ==
- 1967: Knight of the Order of Merit of the Italian Republic (Cavaliere).
- 1968: Member of the Order of the British Empire (MBE) for services to the community.
- 1999: Commander of the Order of Merit of the Italian Republic (Commendatore).
- 2001: Centenary Medal for service to the Italian community and radio broadcasting.

== Bibliography ==
- Gustin, Lena; Gustin, Dino (1988). 70 Anni di Ricordi in Due Mondi (70 Years of Memories in Two Worlds). Sydney.
