= Enmore High School =

Former boys high school in Sydney, Australia

Coordinates: 33°54′10″S 151°10′23″E

Enmore High School is a former boys high school in the inner Sydney suburb of Enmore, Australia.

== History ==
It had previously operated as Canterbury Boys Junior High School since some time in the 1940s until 1954 when it closed there, and opened in Enmore in 1955.

The first headmaster was F. C. Wotton who had been headmaster at Canterbury since 1951 or earlier. He died in July 1955 aged 50 and was replaced by F. C. Wootten (note the similarity in names) who had retired as headmaster of Canterbury Boys' High School at the end of 1954. He died within a month of his appointment to Enmore aged 59.

The school operated on two sites – a larger site on Edgeware Road in Enmore, and a smaller site on Metropolitan Road in Enmore (built in 1884). The school closed in 1990, and the Edgeware Road site became a TAFE college. The smaller Metropolitan Road site was controversially sold by the Department of Education in 2009.

== Notable alumni ==
- Jeff Fenech – former boxer; represented Australia in the flyweight division at the 1984 Los Angeles Olympics and was a triple world professional champion at bantamweight, super bantamweight, and featherweight
- Gary Knoke – Australian athlete
- John Murray – retired NSW politician

== See also ==
- List of government schools in New South Wales: A–F
- Education in Australia
