= Enmore, New South Wales =

Enmore
- Suburb
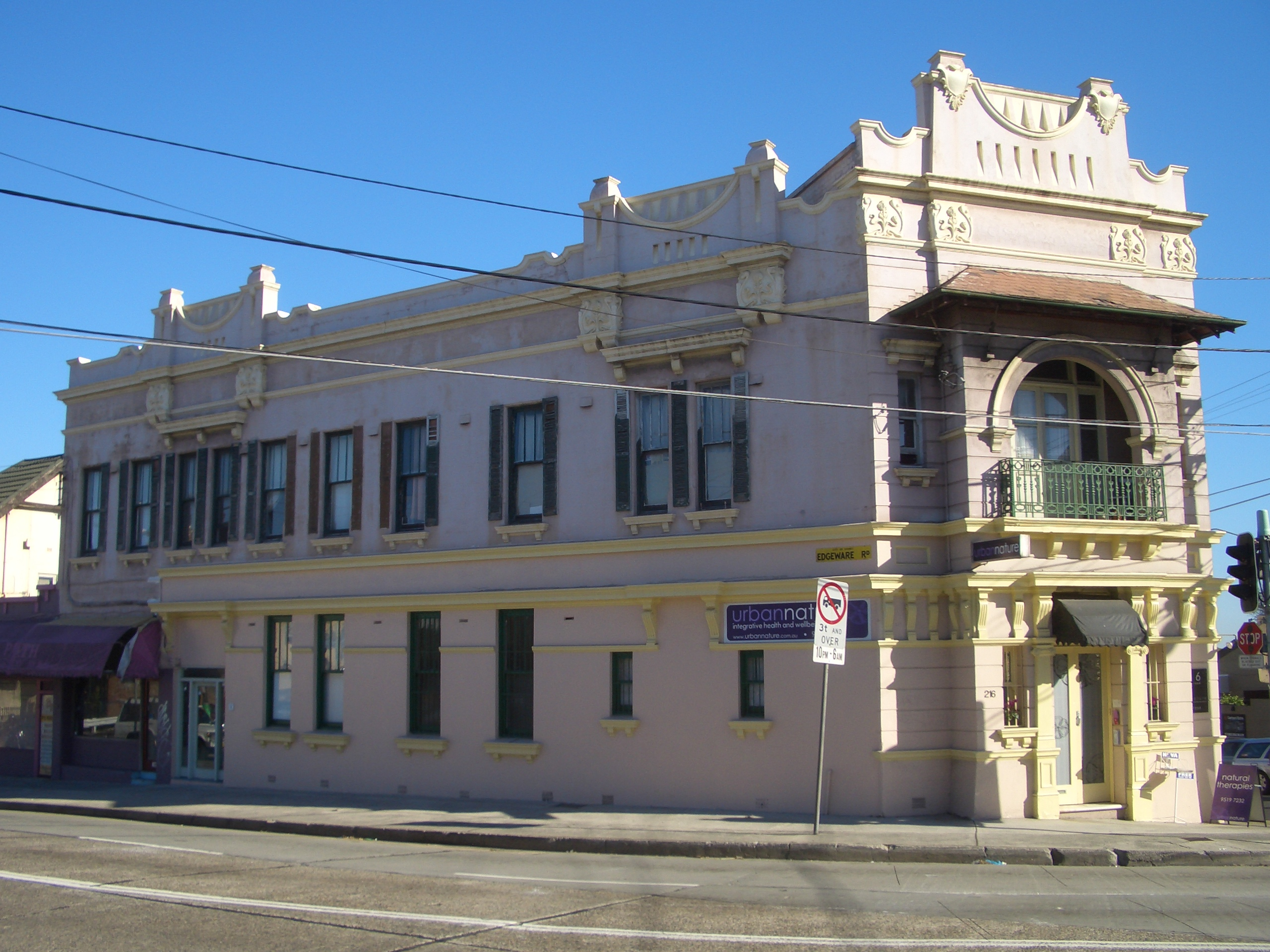
- Victorian commercial building, Enmore and Edgeware Roads

- Interactive map of Enmore
- Country: Australia
- State: New South Wales
- City: Sydney
- LGA: Inner West Council
- Location: 5 km (3.1 mi) from CBD

Government
  - State electorate: Newtown
  - Federal division: Grayndler

Area
  - Total: 0.45 km^{2} (0.17 sq mi)
- Elevation: 38 m (125 ft)

Population
  - Total: 3,871 (2021 census)
  - Density: 8,405/km^{2} (21,770/sq mi)
- Postcode: 2042
Suburbs around Enmore
Stanmore	Stanmore	Newtown
Petersham	Enmore	Newtown
Marrickville	Marrickville	Newtown

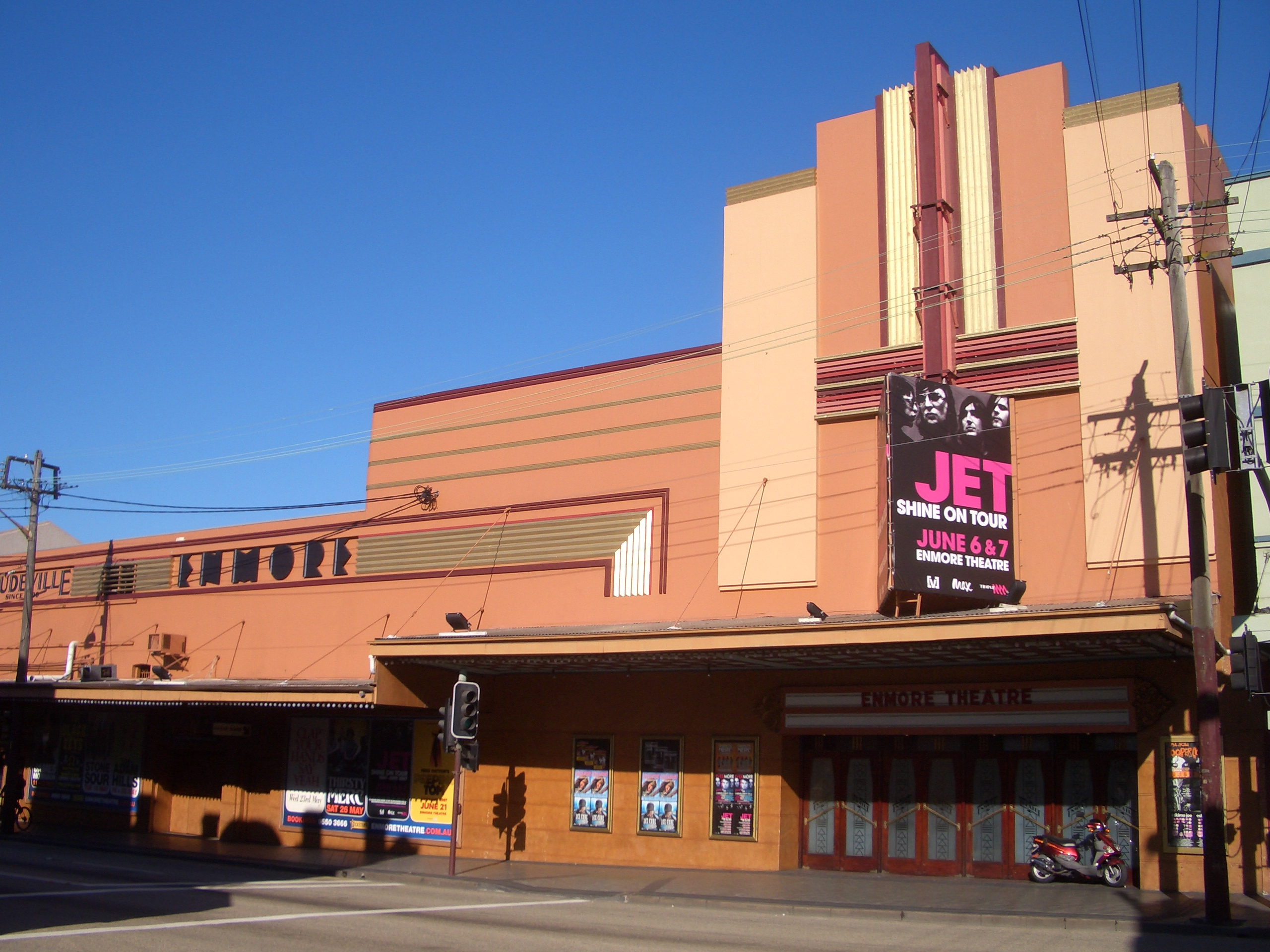
The Art Deco style of the Enmore Theatre, Enmore Road

Enmore is a suburb in the Inner West of Sydney, in the state of New South Wales, Australia. Enmore is located 5 kilometres (3.1 mi) south-west of the Sydney central business district and is part of the local government area of Inner West Council. Like Newtown, Enmore is mostly comprises Victorian era buildings, namely in its commercial area, that provide a hint of the suburb's rich cultural heritage.

== History ==
Enmore was named after Enmore House, built in 1835 by Captain Sylvester Browne, a master mariner with the British East India Company. Browne named his house after the Guyana estate of a business associate, the head of James Cavan & Co, which in turn took its name from Enmore in Somerset, England. Browne's son wrote several Australian classics, including Robbery Under Arms, under the name of Rolf Boldrewood.

In 1836, there was a report of snowfall in the suburb. Weather observer T. A. Browne stated, "the years 1836, 1837 and 1838 were years of drought, and in one of these years [1836] a remarkable thing happened. There was a fall of snow; we made snowballs at Enmore and enjoyed the usual schoolboy amusements therewith".

Enmore House was the home of the Josephson family from 1842 to 1883, when it was demolished. After Josephson's death, his son Joshua Frey Josephson lived there until 1883. Joshua Frey Josephson had four sons and nine daughters from three marriages. One son, Joshua Percy Josephson, was Mayor of Marrickville in 1901. Five streets are named after five of the daughters: Clara, Laura, Marian, Pearl and Sarah.

The house at 75 London Street is listed on the Inner West Council local government heritage register and the (now defunct) Register of the National Estate. It was built c. 1900 and is a notable example of the Federation Queen Anne style, with elaborate Art Nouveau elements.

Enmore is home to Sydney's oldest running live theatre. Built in 1908, the Enmore Theatre is a heritage listed building that plays host to many international bands including; KISS, Nas, Pulp, Massive Attack, Morrissey, Grizzly Bear, Brandy, The Rolling Stones, Oasis, Paramore, Coldplay, Ween, The Offspring, Arctic Monkeys, The White Stripes, Gillian Welch, Noel Gallagher, Kraftwerk, Marilyn Manson, The Tea Party and Nightwish. Up until the 1980s, the theatre also served as a revival cinema screening classic and contemporary films.

In 1980, Labor politician Peter Baldwin was severely bashed after uncovering corruption in the Enmore branch of the ALP.

== Heritage listings ==
Enmore has a number of heritage-listed sites, including:

- 88 Enmore Road: Stanmore House

== Commercial area ==
Enmore is primarily residential, although there is a commercial strip along Enmore Road, which turns off the more famous King Street, Newtown. The now disused, former Enmore Post Office (built 1895) on the corner of Enmore and Stanmore Roads, is listed on the Register of the National Estate as an example of Federation Queen Anne architecture. It was designed by the government architect, Walter Liberty Vernon.

== Schools ==
The suburb is home to the Design Campus of the Sydney Institute, on the site of the former Enmore Boys High School and St. Pius' Primary Catholic School Enmore, near the Marrickville Metro shopping and dining.

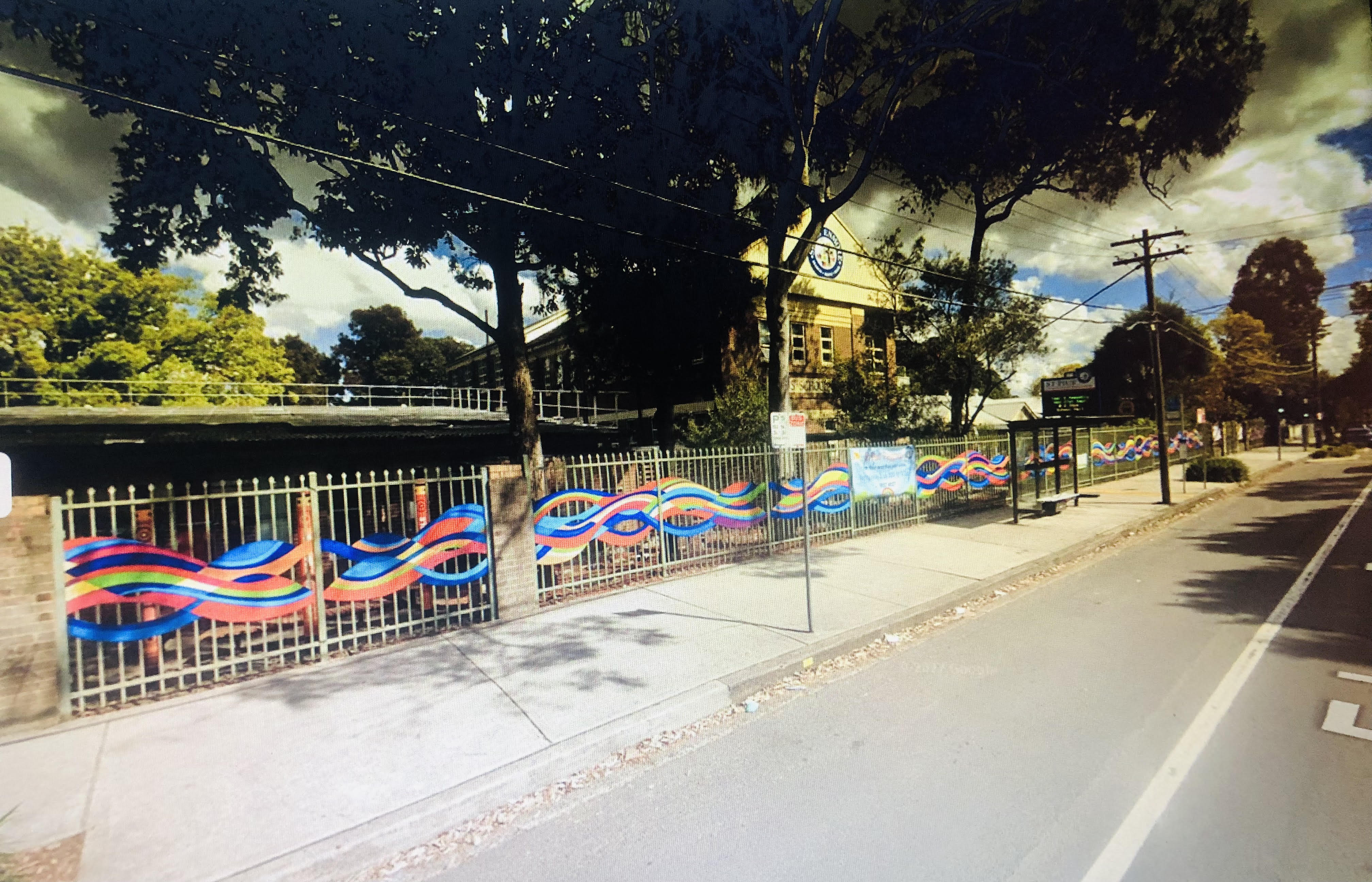
St Pius Catholic School

== Culture ==
- The Enmore Theatre is a renowned live music and comedy venue.
- The Sly Fox, a lesbian/mixed pub. Both Enmore and Newtown have a significant gay and lesbian population.
- Enmore is also a focus for goth subculture in Sydney, with related speciality stores.

== Population ==
At the 2021 census, there were 3,871 residents in Enmore.

- 66.2% of people were born in Australia. The next most common country of birth was England at 5.1%.
- 75.5% of people only spoke English at home. Other languages spoken at home included Greek at 3.3%.
- The most common responses for religion were No Religion 62.2%, Catholic 11.8%, Not stated 6.3%, Eastern Orthodox 3.8% and Anglican 3.6%.
- Major industries of employment in Enmore included Hospitals (except Psychiatric Hospitals) at 4.6%.
- Of occupied private dwellings, 46.3% were semi-detached houses, 32.3% were flats or apartments and 17.3% were separate houses.
- 49.5% of people were renting their home which was considerably higher than the national rate of 30.6% for renting.

=== Notable residents ===
- Rolf Boldrewood, also known as Thomas Alexander Browne, author of Robbery Under Arms.
- Sophie Wilde, actress (Eden, You Don't Know Me)
- George Beranger, actor (The Bat)

== Gallery ==
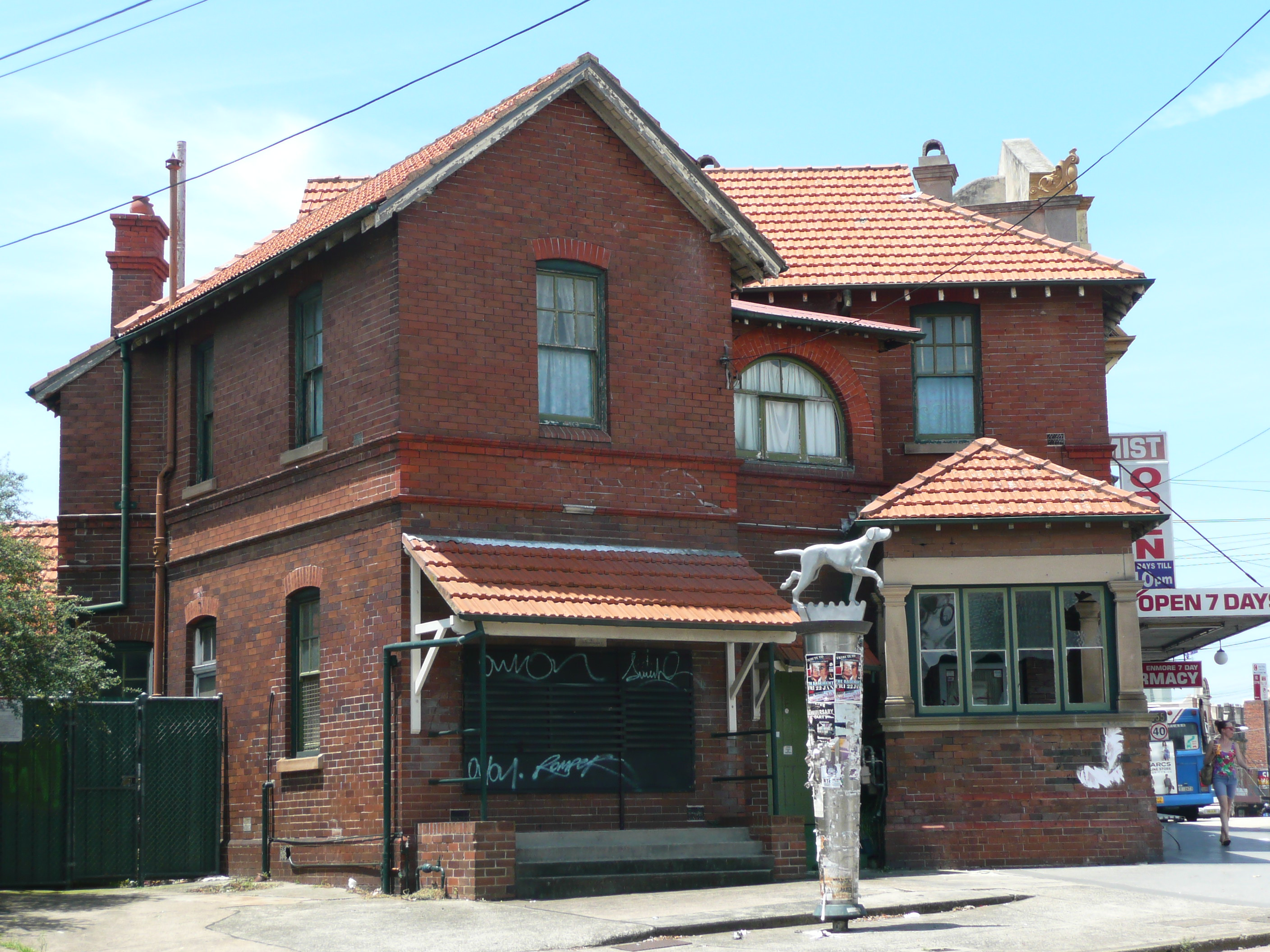
Heritage-listed former post office, Enmore Road

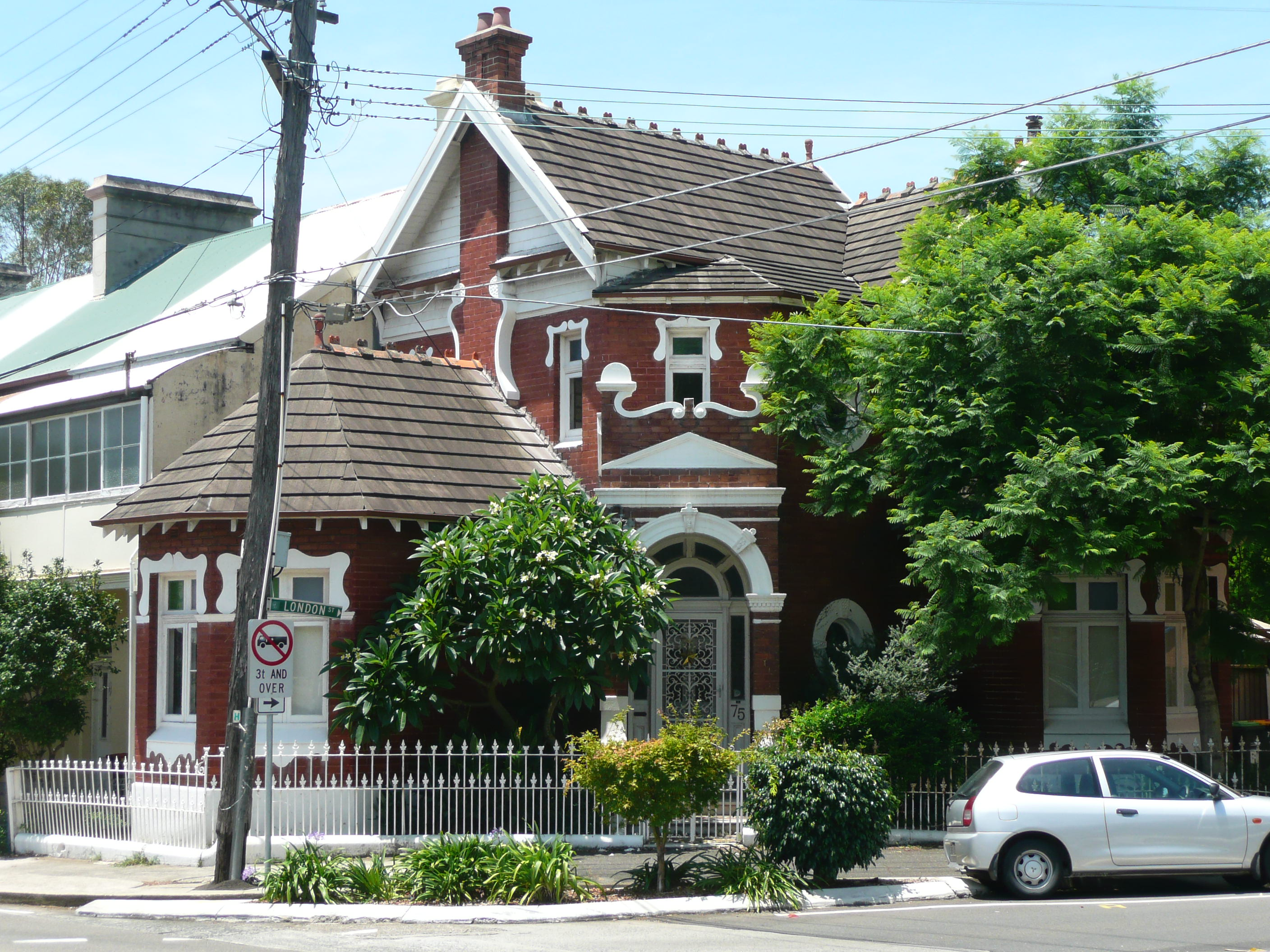
Heritage-listed home, London Street

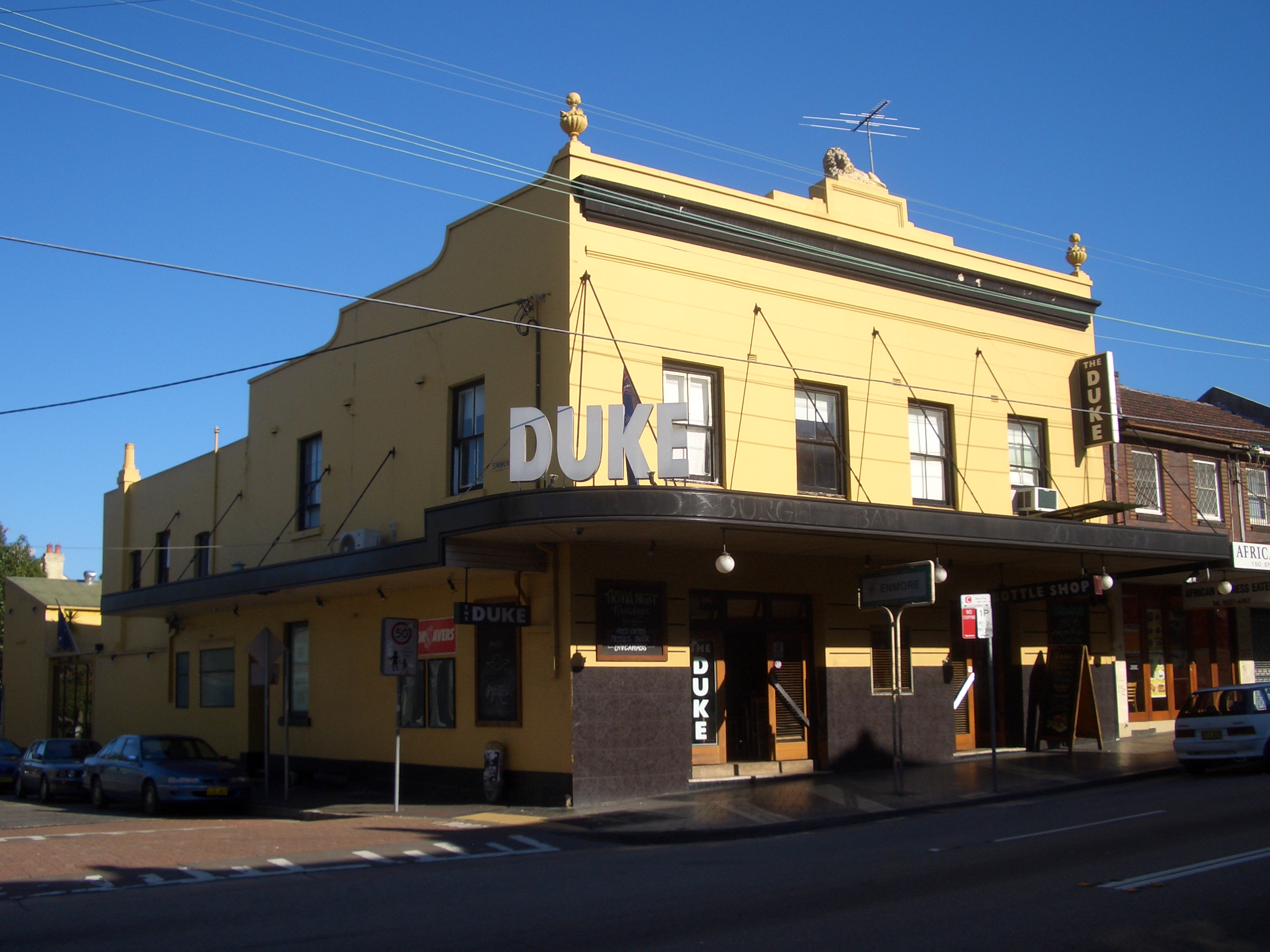
Duke Hotel, Enmore Road
