= John Sidoti =

Australian politician

Minister for Sport, Multiculturalism, Seniors and Veterans
- In office 2 April 2019 – 3 March 2021
- Premier: Gladys Berejiklian
- Preceded by: Stuart Ayres (as Minister for Sport); Ray Williams (as Minister for Multiculturalism); Tanya Davies (Minister for Ageing); David Elliott (as Minister for Veterans Affairs)
- Succeeded by: Natalie Ward

Member of the New South Wales Parliament for Drummoyne
- In office 26 March 2011 – 25 March 2023
- Preceded by: Angela D'Amore
- Succeeded by: Stephanie Di Pasqua

Personal details
- Born: Anthony John Sidoti; 31 July
- Party: Independent (since 2021)
- Other political affiliations: Liberal (until 2021)
- Occupation: Politician

Anthony John Sidoti (Italian: [siˈdɔːti]) is an independent Australian politician who was a member of the New South Wales Legislative Assembly representing Drummoyne since 2011. He was a member of the Liberal Party, but moved to the crossbench as an independent in March 2021, following the announcement of a public inquiry into his property dealings by the Independent Commission Against Corruption (ICAC).

Prior to the ICAC announcement, Sidoti was the New South Wales Minister for Sport, Multiculturalism, Seniors and Veterans in the second Berejiklian ministry between April 2019 and March 2021. He stood down from his ministerial duties in September 2019 pending the potential investigation by ICAC. He was subsequently found to have engaged in serious corrupt conduct.

He stood down at the 2023 New South Wales state election.

== Early career and background ==
The son of Italian immigrants, Sidoti was raised in Sydney's inner west and educated at De La Salle College, Ashfield and the Ryde College of TAFE where he studied hospitality. From 1992 to 2008, Sidoti ran a function centre in Five Dock together with his family, and then was a part-time fruit merchant.

Elected to Burwood Council in 2008, Sidoti served as mayor from 2009 up until the 2011 state election, when he stood down as mayor, remaining as a councillor.

== Political career ==
At the 2011 state election, Sidoti was elected with a swing of 19.4 points, and won the seat with 66.7 per cent of the two-party-preferred vote. Sidoti's main opponent was mayor of the City of Canada Bay, Angelo Tsirekas, representing the Labor Party. At the 2015 state election, Sidoti increased his two-party-preferred margin by around 1.7 points. From 22 June 2011 to 6 March 2015, he chaired the Parliamentary Privileges and Ethics Committee and served as deputy co-chair of the Social Policy Committee. From 17 October 2015 to 23 January 2017, he was parliamentary secretary for Transport, Roads, Industry, Resources and Energy and, from 1 February 2017 to 23 March 2019, was the parliamentary secretary to Cabinet.

Following the 2019 state election, Sidoti was appointed Minister for Sport, Multiculturalism, Seniors and Veterans in the second Berejiklian ministry, with effect from 2 April 2019.

=== Corrupt conduct ===
On 17 September 2019, Sidoti stood down from his ministerial duties pending a potential investigation by the Independent Commission Against Corruption (ICAC) into his property dealings. On 3 March 2021, ICAC announced its intention to conduct a public inquiry into those dealings. As a result, he resigned from the cabinet and moved to the crossbench as an independent. In July 2022, ICAC found that Sidoti had engaged in serious corrupt conduct by using his position to influence local councillors to benefit his family’s property interests. As of July 2022, the ICAC was now seeking advice whether to charge Sidoti with corruption. In 2026, Sidoti was charged with corruption by the Director of Public Prosecutions.

New South Wales Legislative Assembly
Preceded by Angela D'Amore	Member for Drummoyne; 2011–present	Incumbent
Political offices
Preceded by Stuart Ayres as Minister for Sport	Minister for Sport, Multiculturalism, Seniors and Veterans; 2019–2021	Succeeded by Natalie Ward
Preceded by Ray Williams as Minister for Multiculturalism	Minister for Sport, Multiculturalism, Seniors and Veterans; 2019–2021	Succeeded by Natalie Ward
Preceded by Tanya Davies as Minister for Ageing	Minister for Sport, Multiculturalism, Seniors and Veterans; 2019–2021	Succeeded by Natalie Ward
Preceded by David Elliott as Minister for Veterans Affairs	Minister for Sport, Multiculturalism, Seniors and Veterans; 2019–2021	Succeeded by Natalie Ward
