= David McLelland =

Australian politician

David McLelland (12 August 1881 – 1 October 1968) was an Australian politician. He was a Labor Party member of the New South Wales Legislative Assembly from 1930 until 1932, representing the electorate of Drummoyne.

McLelland was born in Ayrshire in Scotland, where he was educated to primary school level. He migrated to Australia in 1911, settling in Brisbane, where he became a blacksmith at the Ipswich Railway Workshops. He moved to Sydney in 1916, where he worked at the Cockatoo Island Dockyard and Mort's Dock. In 1918, he was elected secretary of the Blacksmith's Society, a position he held until his election to parliament in 1930.

McLelland was the Labor candidate for the recreated Legislative Assembly seat of Drummoyne in 1927, losing to sitting Botany MLA John Lee. He defeated Lee on his second attempt in 1930, as Labor won office statewide. His political career was to be short-lived; Labor lost badly in 1932 after the sacking of Jack Lang by the state Governor, and McLelland was defeated by Lee, one of many Labor MLAs to lose their seats. He retired from politics after his 1932 defeat.

McLelland undertook a correspondence course in accountancy after his defeat, but continued to be involved in the trade union movement. He was secretary of the Australian Institute of Political Science until 1939, secretary of the Blacksmith's Society from 1939 until 1944 (his role prior to entering politics), and secretary of the Metal Trades Federation from 1945 until his retirement in 1961.

He died in Sydney in 1968.

New South Wales Legislative Assembly
Preceded by John Lee	Member for Drummoyne; 1930–1932	Succeeded by John Lee
