= Angela D'Amore =

Australian politician

Member of the New South Wales Parliament for Drummoyne
- In office 22 March 2003 – 4 March 2011
- Preceded by: John Murray
- Succeeded by: John Sidoti

Parliamentary Secretary Assisting the Minister for Police and Assisting the Minister for Climate Change and the Environment

Personal details
- Born: 10 October 1971 (age 54) Sydney, New South Wales
- Party: Labor Party (2003–2011)
- Education: University of Sydney

Angela D'Amore (born 10 October 1971), an Australian former politician, was a member of the New South Wales Legislative Assembly, representing the electorate of Drummoyne from 2003 until 2011.

== Background and early years ==
D'Amore is the daughter of immigrants, who migrated from Italy in 1964. She was educated at Bethlehem College, Ashfield and the University of Sydney and was an officer for the Municipal Employees Union and the NSW Nurses’ Association.

== New South Wales state politics ==
D'Amore was elected at the 2003 NSW state election. In March 2010, she was appointed Parliamentary Secretary Assisting the Minister for Police, and Parliamentary Secretary Assisting the Minister for Climate Change and Environment in the Keneally Labor government.

D'Amore's parliamentary activities included:

- Chair of the Committee on the Office of the Ombudsman and Police Integrity Commission, 2007–2008
- Commonwealth Parliamentary Association Women's Representative for Australia
- Deputy Chair of Committee of the International Commonwealth Parliamentary Association Women's Steering

D'Amore proposed major infrastructure changes in the area, such as the M4 East and Iron Cove Bridge widening.. It was claimed that the widening would complement her announcement of securing 400 new bus services in March 2010. The M4 East extension was aimed at channelling traffic underground, easing pressure on surface roads, to help Sydney buses to run more effectively and efficiently. D'Amore claimed that the tunnel would be a major public transport outcome for the Inner West.

On 22 September 2010, it was revealed that D'Amore was under investigation by the Independent Commission Against Corruption (ICAC) relating to the implementation of a 2006 draft guideline. The matter concerned whether relief electorate officers had worked in parliament house or at D'Amore's Drummoyne electorate office. The relief officers had worked the correct days, on the correct rate of pay, and carried out the correct duties, but had undertaken those duties in parliament house rather than the electorate office. During the investigation, the NSW Parliament Employee Services Manager stated that the relief officers' forms had been amended and approved by Parliament as they were in the "spirit of the draft guideline". D'Amore was not made aware by Parliament that the relief officers had not completed forms correctly. Despite that, on 7 December 2010, ICAC made adverse findings against D'Amore and considered that the advice of the NSW Director of Public Prosecutions (DPP) should be sought in relation to prosecuting D'Amore. She stated she was appalled at the findings, and parliamentary colleagues said that she had been unfairly targeted by ICAC. She remained a Labor member until the NSW state election in 2011. In late 2013, the DPP advised ICAC that there was insufficient evidence to support a criminal prosecution of D'Amore, which ICAC accepted.

New South Wales Legislative Assembly
Preceded by John Murray	Member for Drummoyne; 2003–2011	Succeeded by John Sidoti
