= Electoral district of Drummoyne =

State electoral district of New South Wales, Australia

Drummoyne New South Wales—Legislative Assembly
- Interactive map of district boundaries from the 2023 state election
- State: New South Wales
- Dates current: 1913–1920, 1927–present
- MP: Stephanie Di Pasqua
- Party: Liberal
- Namesake: Drummoyne, New South Wales
- Electors: 58,939 (2023)
- Area: 25.49 km^{2} (9.8 sq mi)
- Demographic: Inner-metropolitan
Electorates around Drummoyne:
Ryde	Lane Cove	Lane Cove
Parramatta	Drummoyne	Balmain
Strathfield	Strathfield	Summer Hill

Drummoyne is an electoral district of the Legislative Assembly of the Australian state of New South Wales. It is in Sydney's Inner West, stretching from Cockatoo Island in the east to Rhodes in the west.

It has been represented by Stephanie Di Pasqua of the Liberal Party since the 2023 election.

== Geography ==
On its current boundaries, Drummoyne includes the suburbs and localities of Abbotsford, Breakfast Point, Cabarita, Canada Bay, Chiswick, Cockatoo Island, Concord, Concord West, Drummoyne, Five Dock, Homebush (northern part), Liberty Grove, Mortlake, North Strathfield, Rhodes, Rodd Island, Spectacle Island, Rodd Point, Russell Lea and Wareemba.

== History ==
Drummoyne was created in 1913. With the introduction of proportional representation, it was absorbed into the multi-member electorate of Ryde, but recreated in 1927. For much of the early 1900s, it was a marginal seat. Between the 1960s and 2000s, Drummoyne was a Labor-leaning seat. Currently, the electoral district is represented by Liberal politician Stephanie Di Pasqua.

Notably, the electorate was the scene of future Liberal Prime Minister John Howard's first run for parliament, in 1968.

== Members for Drummoyne ==
First incarnation (1913—1920)
Member	Party	Term
George Richards	Liberal Reform	1913–1915
Alexander Graff	Liberal Reform	1916–1917
Alexander Graff	Nationalist	1917–1920
Alexander Graff	Independent	1920
Second incarnation (1927—present)
Member	Party	Term
John Lee	United Australia	1927–1930
David McLelland	Labor	1930–1932
John Lee	United Australia	1932–1941
Robert Greig	Labor	1941–1947
Robert Dewley	Liberal	1947–1953
Roy Jackson	Labor	1953–1956
Walter Lawrence	Liberal	1956–1962
Reg Coady	Labor	1962–1973
Michael Maher	Labor	1973–1982
John Murray	Labor	1982–2003
Angela D'Amore	Labor	2003–2011
John Sidoti	Liberal	2011–2021
John Sidoti	Independent	2021–2023
Stephanie Di Pasqua	Liberal	2023–present

== Election results ==
2023 New South Wales state election: Drummoyne
Party	Candidate	Votes	%	±%
Liberal	Stephanie Di Pasqua	24,526	47.5	−10.0
Labor	Julia Little	20,182	39.1	+12.5
Greens	Charles Jago	5,149	10.0	+0.6
Sustainable Australia	Patrick Conaghan	1,782	3.5	+3.5
Total formal votes		51,639	97.8	+0.1
Informal votes		1,177	2.2	−0.1
Turnout		52,816	89.6	−0.2
Two-party-preferred result
Liberal	Stephanie Di Pasqua	25,308	51.3	−12.3
Labor	Julia Little	24,023	48.7	+12.3
Liberal hold		Swing	−12.3	

The incumbent member, John Sidoti, was expelled from the Liberal Party and sat as an independent, before being suspended from Parliament. Sidoti did not contest the seat and the Liberal candidate (Stephanie Di Pasqua) subsequently retained the seat for the Liberal Party.
