= 1982 Lowe by-election =

Australian parliamentary by-election

A by-election was held for the Australian House of Representatives seat of Lowe on 13 March 1982. This was triggered by the resignation of former Liberal Party Prime Minister and MP Sir William McMahon.

The by-election was won by Labor Party candidate Michael Maher.

The election occurred during the Franklin Dam controversy in Tasmania, which had broad national support; 12% of voters wrote 'No Dams' on their ballot papers.

== Results ==
1982 Lowe by-election
| Party | Candidate | Votes | % | ±% |
|---|---|---|---|---|
| Labor | Michael Maher | 32,717 | 53.4 | +7.0 |
| Liberal | Philip Taylor | 23,637 | 38.6 | −10.1 |
| Democrats | Stephen Kirkham | 2,495 | 4.1 | +1.1 |
| Independent | Maddalena Gustin | 729 | 1.2 | +1.2 |
| Independent | Katherine Wentworth | 462 | 0.8 | +0.8 |
| Independent | Charles Bellchambers | 460 | 0.8 | +0.8 |
| Republican | Peter Consandine | 405 | 0.7 | +0.7 |
| Independent | Maggie Lee | 144 | 0.2 | +0.2 |
| Independent | Robert Cameron | 116 | 0.2 | +0.2 |
| Independent | John Penninger | 56 | 0.1 | +0.1 |
| Independent | Frederick Martin | 49 | 0.1 | +0.1 |
| Independent | Robert Webeck | 27 | 0.0 | +0.0 |
| Total formal votes | | 61,297 | 96.7 | −0.4 |
| Informal votes | | 2,091 | 3.3 | +0.4 |
| Turnout | | 63,388 | 89.1 | −3.6 |
Two-party-preferred result
| Labor | Michael Maher | | 58.3 | +9.4 |
| Liberal | Philip Taylor | | 41.7 | −9.4 |
| Labor gain from Liberal | | Swing | +9.4 | |

== See also ==
- List of Australian federal by-elections
