= Walter Bentley (actor) =

Scottish actor

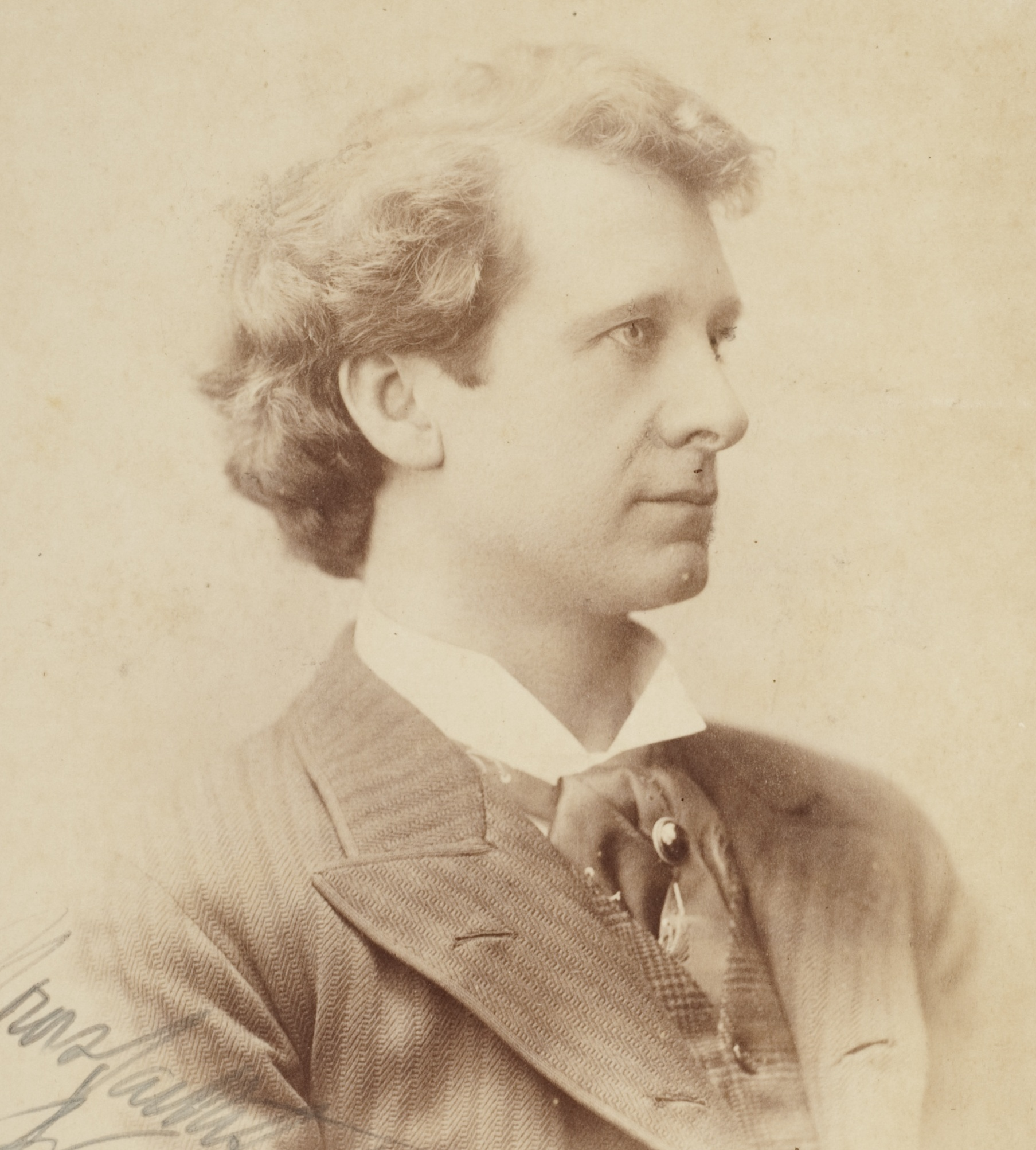
- Bentley in 1893
- Born: William Begg; 7 October 1849; Edinburgh, Scotland
- Died: 19 September 1927 (aged 77); Sydney, Australia
- Occupation: Shakespearean stage actor
- Years active: 1873–1920

Walter Bentley (born William Begg; 7 October 1849 – 19 September 1927) was a Scottish actor who specialised in Shakespearean roles and productions. He became popular in his adopted country of Australia for performing and promoting the theatre. He helped found the Australian Actors' Association and established Walter Bentley's College of Elocution and Dramatic Art which later became the Sydney Academy of Music and Dramatic Art.

== Early life ==
Bentley was born as William Begg in Edinburgh, Scotland, the son of Maria Faithful and the Reverend James Begg, a Presbyterian preacher and one of the founders of the Free Church of Scotland. Bentley wanted to be a stage actor but was met with disapproval from both his father and his aunt, the women's rights activist Emily Faithfull. He signed on with the White Star Line as an apprentice seaman, but jumped ship in Australia in 1867 following a quarrel on board ship. He found work as a jackeroo on a sheep station in Rockhampton, Queensland, Australia and then, in 1871, settled with his brother in Dunedin, New Zealand.

== Acting career ==
While working for the city of Dunedin, Bentley began performing in amateur theatrical productions. In 1873, he became a professional full-time actor in local theatre in New Zealand. He moved to London, England in 1874 and formally adopted the stage name of Walter Bentley. He became the protege of Henry Irving from 1876 through 1878, performing at Irving's Lyceum Theatre in London. During subsequent years, Bentley toured throughout the British provinces. He spent three years in the United States performing the lead role of Wilfred Denver in The Silver King.

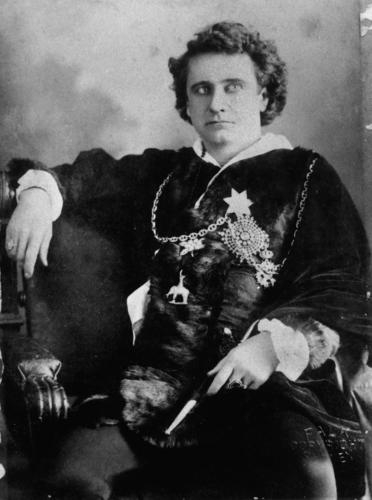
Bentley as Hamlet

In the early 1890s, Bentley was invited to tour Australia by George Coppin. His first performances for Coppin in Rob Roy, Hamlet and Othello at Melbourne's Theatre Royal were well received. After a brief tour in New Zealand, Bentley returned to Sydney where he successfully performed and produced plays under his own production company. For the next two decades, Bentley toured throughout the Australian territories and he established himself as the premier Shakespearean actor in the country. Bentley also performed during tours in England, New Zealand and South Africa. Bentley based himself in Brisbane, Queensland where he created the Walter Bentley Dramatic Art Classes to teach Shakespeare's plays.

Bentley eventually settled permanently in Australia, and after his retirement from the stage, his company of the Walter Bentley Players continued as a top acting troupe. Along with George Titheradge, Bentley was instrumental in establishing the Australian Actors' Association in 1910. He also established Walter Bentley's College of Elocution and Dramatic Art which later merged with the Australian College of Music to become the Sydney Academy of Music and Dramatic Art.

== Later life and death ==
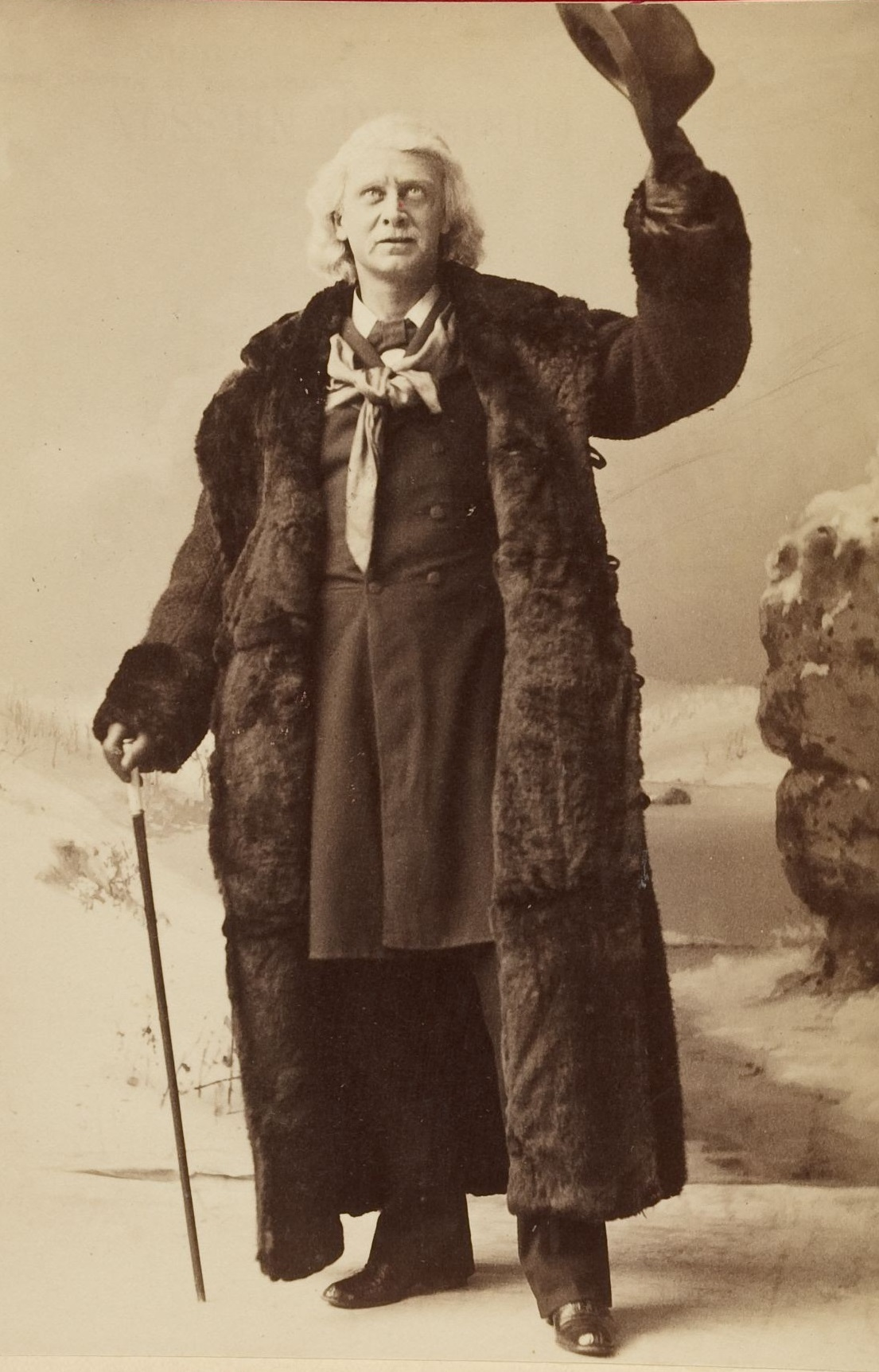
Walter Bentley, Harvard Theatre Collection

Bentley lived in Sydney where he continued to promote the theatre through his drama school, with speaking engagements and by writing magazine articles. His health deteriorated, resulting in severe depression. He was confined to his bed during his final year and committed suicide on 19 September 1927 by a gunshot to the head. He was cremated at Rookwood Cemetery. He was survived by his wife and a daughter.
