= Stephanie Di Pasqua =

Australian politician

Cr Stephanie Di Pasqua MP

Member of the New South Wales Assembly for Drummoyne
- Incumbent
- Assumed office 25 March 2023
- Preceded by: John Sidoti

Councillor of the City of Canada Bay
- In office 9 September 2017 – 14 September 2024

Personal details
- Party: Liberal

Stephanie Marie Di Pasqua (Italian: [di ˈpaskwa]) is an Australian politician. She was elected a member of the New South Wales Legislative Assembly representing Drummoyne for the Liberal party in 2023.

== Career ==
Di Pasqua was elected as a councillor City of Canada Bay at the 2017 New South Wales local elections, serving until the 2024 New South Wales local elections.

Di Pasqua previously worked as an electorate officer for former Liberal MP John Sidoti. She was on leave from this position once she was preselected for the 2023 election.

== Personal life ==
She is Italian by descent and is fluent in the language.

New South Wales Legislative Assembly
| Preceded by John Sidoti | Member for Drummoyne; 2023–present | Incumbent |
