= John Murray (New South Wales politician) =

Australian politician

The Honourable John Murray

27th Speaker of the New South Wales Legislative Assembly
- In office 2 May 1995 – 28 February 2003
- Preceded by: Kevin Rozzoli
- Succeeded by: John Aquilina

Member of the New South Wales Legislative Assembly for Drummoyne
- In office 17 April 1982 – 28 February 2003
- Preceded by: Michael Maher
- Succeeded by: Angela D'Amore

Councillor of the Sydney County Council for the 2nd Constituency
- In office 5 November 1980 – 6 June 1984 Serving with John Gorrie
- Preceded by: Stanley Hedges; Douglas Carruthers
- Succeeded by: Kevin Hill; Erling Calver

Personal details
- Born: John Henry Murray; 14 July 1939 (age 86) Sydney, New South Wales, Australia
- Party: Labor Party
- Profession: Teacher

John Henry Murray (born 14 July 1939) is an Australian politician. He was a Labor Party member of the New South Wales Legislative Assembly from 1982 to 2003, representing the electorate of Drummoyne. Murray was the Speaker of the Legislative Assembly from 1995 until his retirement in 2003.

Murray was born in Sydney, and attended Lakemba Primary School, Canterbury Boys' High School and Enmore Boys High School. He studied teaching at Sydney Teachers' College and the University of Sydney, and went on to teach at Finley High School, Ashfield Boys High School and Picnic Point High School. He was also involved in local politics, serving as an alderman on Drummoyne Municipal Council from 1973 to 1983, including four years as mayor, and serving as a councillor on the Sydney County Council from 1980 to 1984.

Murray was involved in local branch politics, and won Labor preselection to contest the local seat of Drummoyne at the 1982 by-election caused by the resignation of sitting MLA Michael Maher to enter federal politics. He was easily elected, as Drummoyne was considered a safe Labor seat, and re-elected five more times. He served as Shadow Minister for Local Government while Labor was in opposition, and when Labor won office in 1995, was appointed Speaker of the Legislative Assembly, holding the office until his retirement in 2003.

Even though Murray became Speaker as a result of his party holding majority government, Liberal Opposition Leader Peter Collins made issue of Murray's election as Speaker, saying that Murray's election was illegal since some ALP members showed their ballot papers to each other, which contravened recent changes to the Constitution. Leader of the House, Paul Whelan, said Collins had not raised an objection at the time of the ballot.

New South Wales Legislative Assembly
Preceded by Michael Maher	Member for Drummoyne; 1982–2003	Succeeded by Angela D'Amore
Preceded by Kevin Rozzoli	Speaker of the New South Wales Legislative Assembly; 1995–2003	Succeeded by John Aquilina
