= George Richards (Australian politician) =

Australian politician

George Richards (25 February 1865 – 4 December 1915) was an Australian politician, elected as a member of the New South Wales Legislative Assembly on a platform promising trams down Lyons road in Drummoyne. Elected as a Liberal candidate, he served as the member representing Drummoyne in 1913–1915.

George Richards lived with his family in "East Lynne", a house in the electorate, and died of a heart attack on the bowling green leaving a widow, three sons and five daughters. One of his grandsons (named after him) became the editor of Column 8.

== Notes ==
New South Wales Legislative Assembly
Preceded by New seat	Member for Drummoyne; 1913 – 1915	Succeeded by Alexander Graff
