= Alexander Graff =

Australian politician

Alexander Graff (24 August 1879 – 10 October 1956) was an Australian politician.

He was born in Woolloomooloo to pawnbroker Alexander Graff and Sarah Seymour. He attended Cleveland Street Public School, and from 1900 was a storekeeper in Drummoyne. He worked as a real estate agent from around 1911. On 16 November 1912 he married Adela Ada Eldridge, with whom he had two daughters. He was also a Drummoyne alderman from 1911 to 1917, serving as mayor from 1914 to 1915. In 1916 he was elected to the New South Wales Legislative Assembly as the Liberal member for Drummoyne. By the time he retired in 1920 he was an independent. He died in 1956 at Five Dock.

New South Wales Legislative Assembly
Preceded by George Richards	Member for Drummoyne; 1916–1920	Abolished
