= Michael Maher (Australian politician) =

Australian politician

Michael Maher OAM

Member of the Australian Parliament for Lowe
- In office 13 March 1982 – 11 July 1987
- Preceded by: William McMahon
- Succeeded by: Bob Woods

Personal details
- Born: 11 July 1936 Sydney, New South Wales
- Died: 29 September 2013 (aged 77) Sydney, New South Wales
- Party: Australian Labor Party
- Education: University of Sydney
- Occupation: Solicitor

Michael John Maher OAM (11 July 1936 – 29 September 2013) was an Australian politician. Born in Sydney, he attended De La Salle College Ashfield and the University of Sydney and became a solicitor. A member of the Labor Party, he was elected to the New South Wales Legislative Assembly at the 1973 election, representing the seat of Drummoyne. He held Drummoyne until resigning to contest the 1982 Lowe by-election, caused by the resignation of former Liberal Prime Minister William McMahon. Maher was successful, and held the seat until 1987, when he was defeated by Bob Woods. Michael Maher was described in 2000 by a subsequent ALP Member for Lowe, John Murphy, as 'one of the most genuine and most loved members to grace this House'.

In 2000, Maher was honoured with the Medal of the Order of Australia for service to parliament at state and federal levels, and to the Maltese community of New South Wales.

Maher died in Sydney on 29 September 2013 (aged 77).

New South Wales Legislative Assembly
Preceded by Reg Coady	Member for Drummoyne; 1973–1982	Succeeded by John Murray
Parliament of Australia
Preceded by William McMahon	Member for Lowe; 1982–1987	Succeeded by Bob Woods
