= Results of the 2007 New South Wales Legislative Assembly election =

State election for New South Wales, Australia in March 2007

Party	Votes	%	+/–	Seats	+/–
Labor	1,535,872	38.87	▼3.81	52	▼1
Liberal	1,061,273	26.86	▲2.14	22	▲4
National	396,023	10.02	▲0.39	13	▲1
Independents	361,866	9.16	▲0.97	6	▼3
Greens	352,805	8.93	▲0.68	0	Steady
Christian Democrats	97,420	2.47	▲0.74	0	Steady
Unity	43,292	1.10	▼0.20	0	Steady
Democrats	21,099	0.53	▼0.40	0	Steady
Others	81,927	2.07	0.77	0	Steady
Total	3,951,577	100.00	–	93	–
Valid votes	3,951,577	97.24			
Invalid/blank votes	112,152	2.76	▲0.14		
Total votes	4,063,729	100.00	–		
Registered voters/turnout	4,374,029	92.91	▲1.04		
Source: NSW Elections - 2007 Results
Two-party-preferred
Labor	1,788,142	52.26	▼3.92		
Liberal/National	1,633,381	47.74	▲3.92		
Total	3,421,523	100.00	–		

Popular vote
Labor	38.98%
Liberal	26.94%
National	10.05%
Independent	9.18%
Greens	8.95%
Christian Democrats	2.47%
Unity	0.90%
Democrats	0.54%
Others	1.99%
Two-party-preferred vote
Labor	52.26%
Coalition	47.74%
Parliamentary seats
Labor	55.91%
Liberal	23.66%
National	13.98%
Independent	6.45%

This is a list of electoral district results for the 2007 New South Wales state election.

== Results by electoral district ==
=== Albury ===
2007 New South Wales state election: Albury
Party	Candidate	Votes	%	±%
Liberal	Greg Aplin	27,643	65.3	+19.2
Labor	Chris Ryan	11,589	27.4	+13.9
Greens	Chris Sobey	3,077	7.3	+4.4
Total formal votes		42,309	97.4	−0.2
Informal votes		1,143	2.6	+0.2
Turnout		43,452	90.4	
Two-party-preferred result
Liberal	Greg Aplin	28,311	69.0	−3.4
Labor	Chris Ryan	12,731	31.0	+3.4
Liberal hold		Swing	−3.4	

=== Auburn ===
2007 New South Wales state election: Auburn
Party	Candidate	Votes	%	±%
Labor	Barbara Perry	24,314	60.3	+0.7
Liberal	George Pierides	5,771	14.3	−2.4
Unity	Jack Au	3,866	9.6	+2.4
Greens	Malikeh Michaels	1,621	4.0	−4.3
Christian Democrats	Allan Lotfizadeh	1,582	3.9	+1.1
Independent	Mamdouh Habib	1,554	3.9	+3.9
Democrats	Silma Ihram	1,087	2.7	+1.3
Independent	Bob Vinnicombe	536	1.3	+1.3
Total formal votes		42,331	95.8	+0.2
Informal votes		1,775	4.2	−0.2
Turnout		42,106	91.9	
Two-party-preferred result
Labor	Barbara Perry	27,095	78.7	+2.2
Liberal	George Pierides	7,312	21.3	−2.2
Labor hold		Swing	+2.2	

=== Ballina ===
2007 New South Wales state election: Ballina
Party	Candidate	Votes	%	±%
National	Don Page	21,983	54.4	+2.5
Labor	Melanie Doriean	9,330	23.1	−2.6
Greens	John Bailey	7,861	19.4	−0.2
Democrats	Ben Smith	714	1.8	+1.8
AAFI	Flora Boyd	551	1.4	+1.4
Total formal votes		41,439	98.5	+0.1
Informal votes		612	1.5	−0.1
Turnout		41,051	89.9	
Two-party-preferred result
National	Don Page	23,201	64.5	+5.1
Labor	Melanie Doriean	12,778	35.5	−5.1
National hold		Swing	+5.1	

=== Balmain ===
2007 New South Wales state election: Balmain
Party	Candidate	Votes	%	±%
Labor	Verity Firth	16,562	39.2	−2.9
Greens	Rochelle Porteous	12,471	29.5	+0.2
Liberal	Peter Shmigel	10,031	23.8	+2.7
Independent	Jane Ward	1,297	3.1	+3.1
Independent	Jane Hyde	987	2.3	+2.3
Democrats	Edward Okulicz	881	2.1	−0.3
Total formal votes		42,229	97.5	−0.1
Informal votes		1,088	2.5	+0.1
Turnout		43,317	89.8	
Notional two-party-preferred count
Labor	Verity Firth	24,566	67.8	+0.2
Liberal	Peter Shmigel	11,659	32.2	−0.2
Two-candidate-preferred result
Labor	Verity Firth	17,933	53.7	−3.4
Greens	Rochelle Porteous	15,431	46.3	+3.4
Labor notional hold		Swing	−3.4	

=== Bankstown ===
2007 New South Wales state election: Bankstown
Party	Candidate	Votes	%	±%
Labor	Tony Stewart	25,671	64.2	+2.7
Liberal	Mark Majewski	7,977	20.0	+2.5
Greens	Simon Brooks	2,142	5.4	−1.4
Christian Democrats	Zarif Abdulla	1,897	4.7	+1.6
Unity	Shawky Salah	1,444	3.6	−0.5
AAFI	Lynette Rogers	845	2.1	+0.6
Total formal votes		39,976	94.9	+0.2
Informal votes		2,154	5.1	−0.2
Turnout		42,130	92.7	
Two-party-preferred result
Labor	Tony Stewart	27,234	75.4	−1.0
Liberal	Mark Majewski	8,870	24.6	+1.0
Labor hold		Swing	−1.0	

=== Barwon ===
2007 New South Wales state election: Barwon
Party	Candidate	Votes	%	±%
National	Kevin Humphries	17,591	44.3	−8.1
Independent	Tim Horan	11,607	29.2	+29.2
Labor	Meryl Dillon	7,732	19.5	−9.0
Greens	Darren Bodell	1,180	3.0	+0.5
Christian Democrats	Heath Wilson	906	2.3	+2.3
Independent	Les Paul	696	1.8	+1.8
Total formal votes		39,712	97.8	0.0
Informal votes		877	2.2	0.0
Turnout		40,589	91.1	
Notional two-party-preferred count
National	Kevin Humphries	20,932	68.9	+4.6
Labor	Meryl Dillon	9,450	31.1	−4.6
Two-candidate-preferred result
National	Kevin Humphries	19,021	56.0	−8.3
Independent	Tim Horan	14,950	44.0	+44.0
National hold		Swing	−8.3	

=== Bathurst ===
2007 New South Wales state election: Bathurst
Party	Candidate	Votes	%	±%
Labor	Gerard Martin	23,443	53.4	−0.8
National	Susan Williams	13,496	30.8	−0.6
Independent	Ray Thompson	4,816	11.0	+11.0
Greens	Sebria Lawrence	2,124	4.8	−1.4
Total formal votes		43,879	98.1	0.0
Informal votes		872	1.9	0.0
Turnout		44,751	93.9	
Two-party-preferred result
Labor	Gerard Martin	25,195	63.0	−0.2
National	Susan Williams	14,781	37.0	+0.2
Labor hold		Swing	−0.2	

=== Baulkham Hills ===
2007 New South Wales state election: Baulkham Hills
Party	Candidate	Votes	%	±%
Liberal	Wayne Merton	23,153	51.5	+5.9
Labor	Tony Hay	13,940	31.0	−5.3
Greens	Mark Rodowicz	3,359	7.5	+0.7
Christian Democrats	Godwin Goh	2,173	4.8	+0.4
Unity	Yan Li	1,251	2.8	+0.7
AAFI	Gregory Piol	1,046	2.3	+0.0
Total formal votes		44,922	97.5	−0.1
Informal votes		1,147	2.5	+0.1
Turnout		46,069	94.3	
Two-party-preferred result
Liberal	Wayne Merton	24,870	60.5	+6.5
Labor	Tony Hay	16,211	39.5	−6.5
Liberal hold		Swing	+6.5	

=== Bega ===
2007 New South Wales state election: Bega
Party	Candidate	Votes	%	±%
Liberal	Andrew Constance	20,196	46.9	+10.8
Labor	Wilma Chinnock	15,053	34.9	+4.5
Greens	Margaret Perger	3,248	7.5	−2.6
Independent	David Hede	3,071	7.1	+7.1
AAFI	Philip Hodge	799	1.9	+1.9
Christian Democrats	Wess Buckley	714	1.7	+0.4
Total formal votes		43,081	97.8	+0.2
Informal votes		949	2.2	−0.2
Turnout		44,030	92.5	
Two-party-preferred result
Liberal	Andrew Constance	21,778	55.1	+0.4
Labor	Wilma Chinnock	17,771	44.9	−0.4
Liberal hold		Swing	+0.4	

=== Blacktown ===
2007 New South Wales state election: Blacktown
Party	Candidate	Votes	%	±%
Labor	Paul Gibson	25,698	61.7	−1.6
Liberal	Mark Spencer	8,649	20.8	+1.2
Christian Democrats	Bernie Gesling	2,965	7.1	+2.1
Greens	John Forrester	2,008	4.8	+0.7
AAFI	Donald McNaught	1,262	3.0	+1.3
Independent	F Ivor	678	1.6	+1.6
Unity	Bill Jiang	419	1.0	+0.2
Total formal votes		41,679	96.3	0.0
Informal votes		1,622	3.7	0.0
Turnout		43,301	93.4	
Two-party-preferred result
Labor	Paul Gibson	27,192	72.4	−2.5
Liberal	Mark Spencer	10,362	27.6	+2.5
Labor hold		Swing	−2.5	

=== Blue Mountains ===
2007 New South Wales state election: Blue Mountains
Party	Candidate	Votes	%	±%
Labor	Phil Koperberg	17,449	40.8	−4.8
Liberal	Michael Paag	12,179	28.5	+1.2
Greens	Pippa McInnes	6,947	16.2	−1.0
Independent	Robert Stock	4,700	11.0	+11.0
AAFI	Robert Dwight	837	2.0	+2.0
Outdoor Recreation	Bob Wilcox	675	1.6	+1.6
Total formal votes		42,787	97.9	−0.1
Informal votes		922	2.1	+0.1
Turnout		43,709	93.5	
Two-party-preferred result
Labor	Phil Koperberg	22,413	61.1	−3.7
Liberal	Michael Paag	14,298	38.9	+3.7
Labor hold		Swing	−3.7	

=== Burrinjuck ===
2007 New South Wales state election: Burrinjuck
Party	Candidate	Votes	%	±%
National	Katrina Hodgkinson	27,939	64.7	+7.5
Labor	Jessica Forde	12,601	29.2	−3.8
Greens	Iain Fyfe	2,645	6.1	+1.8
Total formal votes		43,185	98.0	−0.2
Informal votes		862	2.0	+0.2
Turnout		44,047	93.5	
Two-party-preferred result
National	Katrina Hodgkinson	28,442	67.3	+4.9
Labor	Jessica Forde	13,799	32.7	−4.9
National hold		Swing	+4.9	

=== Cabramatta ===
2007 New South Wales state election: Cabramatta
Party	Candidate	Votes	%	±%
Labor	Reba Meagher	29,962	69.1	+3.1
Liberal	Victor Smith	7,082	16.3	+4.7
Unity	Andrew Su	3,343	7.7	+0.1
Greens	Rodrigo Gutierrez	2,988	6.9	+3.8
Total formal votes		43,375	96.1	−0.3
Informal votes		1,770	3.9	+0.3
Turnout		45,145	92.6	
Two-party-preferred result
Labor	Reba Meagher	31,584	79.0	−2.4
Liberal	Victor Smith	8,373	21.0	+2.4
Labor hold		Swing	−2.4	

=== Camden ===
2007 New South Wales state election: Camden
Party	Candidate	Votes	%	±%
Labor	Geoff Corrigan	18,658	44.8	−5.3
Liberal	Chris Patterson	16,071	38.6	+3.8
Greens	Allen Powell	2,150	5.2	+0.4
Christian Democrats	Judy Morris	1,578	3.8	+3.7
AAFI	Chris Bowen	1,228	2.9	+0.7
Independent	Katryna Thirup	1,131	2.7	+2.7
Independent	Leon Belgrave	503	1.2	+1.2
Independent	Chris Buchtmann	346	0.8	+0.8
Total formal votes		41,665	96.8	−0.5
Informal votes		1,366	3.2	+0.5
Turnout		43,031	94.4	
Two-party-preferred result
Labor	Geoff Corrigan	20,333	53.9	−4.8
Liberal	Chris Patterson	17,370	46.1	+4.8
Labor hold		Swing	−4.8	

=== Campbelltown ===
2007 New South Wales state election: Campbelltown
Party	Candidate	Votes	%	±%
Labor	Graham West	22,032	55.6	−4.6
Liberal	Stacey Copas	9,687	24.4	−0.8
AAFI	Colin Marsh	2,849	7.2	+3.8
Greens	Victoria Waldron Hahn	2,612	6.6	+1.4
Christian Democrats	David Wright	2,446	6.2	+5.1
Total formal votes		39,626	96.2	−0.6
Informal votes		1,555	3.8	+0.6
Turnout		41,181	93.3	
Two-party-preferred result
Labor	Graham West	24,251	68.5	−1.4
Liberal	Stacey Copas	11,169	31.5	+1.4
Labor hold		Swing	−1.4	

=== Canterbury ===
2007 New South Wales state election: Canterbury
Party	Candidate	Votes	%	±%
Labor	Linda Burney	24,634	57.1	+1.6
Liberal	Philip Mansour	7,907	18.3	+2.1
Greens	Christine Donayre	5,629	13.0	+1.6
Unity	Jing Ren	2,809	6.5	+0.6
Christian Democrats	Ehab Hennien	1,359	3.1	+3.0
AAFI	Alan Cronin	822	1.9	+1.9
Total formal votes		43,160	95.8	+0.0
Informal votes		1,878	4.2	+0.0
Turnout		45,038	92.3	
Two-party-preferred result
Labor	Linda Burney	29,046	77.1	−0.3
Liberal	Philip Mansour	8,609	22.9	+0.3
Labor hold		Swing	−0.3	

=== Castle Hill ===
2007 New South Wales state election: Castle Hill
Party	Candidate	Votes	%	±%
Liberal	Michael Richardson	24,999	56.5	+6.7
Labor	Alex Mustafa	10,138	22.9	−5.9
Greens	Carol Flanagan	3,961	9.0	+2.1
Christian Democrats	Darryl Allen	2,362	5.3	+0.9
Unity	Sheng Lin	1,987	4.5	+0.8
AAFI	Mervyn Foley	780	1.8	+0.4
Total formal votes		44,227	97.6	−0.5
Informal votes		1,094	2.4	+0.5
Turnout		45,321	93.3	
Two-party-preferred result
Liberal	Michael Richardson	27,340	69.1	+8.3
Labor	Alex Mustafa	12,240	30.9	−8.3
Liberal notional hold		Swing	+8.3	

=== Cessnock ===
2007 New South Wales state election: Cessnock
Party	Candidate	Votes	%	±%
Labor	Kerry Hickey	24,026	54.8	−3.8
National	Trevor Hollingshed	13,754	31.4	+12.8
Greens	James Ryan	6,053	13.8	+6.7
Total formal votes		43,833	96.9	−0.4
Informal votes		1,379	3.1	+0.4
Turnout		45,212	94.1	
Two-party-preferred result
Labor	Kerry Hickey	25,347	62.4	−6.7
National	Trevor Hollingshed	15,264	37.6	+6.7
Labor hold		Swing	−6.7	

=== Charlestown ===
2007 New South Wales state election: Charlestown
Party	Candidate	Votes	%	±%
Labor	Matthew Morris	18,633	43.5	−6.3
Independent	Paul Scarfe	10,531	24.6	+24.6
Liberal	Lindsay Paterson	7,988	18.6	−10.2
Greens	Jane Smith	4,378	10.2	+1.7
Christian Democrats	Jim Kendall	1,342	3.1	+0.9
Total formal votes		42,872	97.2	−0.1
Informal votes		1,228	2.8	+0.1
Turnout		44,100	94.2	
Notional two-party-preferred count
Labor	Matthew Morris	22,404	64.6	+1.3
Liberal	Lindsay Paterson	12,280	35.4	−1.3
Two-candidate-preferred result
Labor	Matthew Morris	21,139	57.0	−6.3
Independent	Paul Scarfe	15,924	43.0	+43.0
Labor hold		Swing	N/A	

=== Clarence ===
2007 New South Wales state election: Clarence
Party	Candidate	Votes	%	±%
National	Steve Cansdell	23,181	52.9	+4.0
Labor	Mark Kingsley	13,148	30.0	−6.9
Independent	Craig Howe	3,274	7.5	+7.5
Greens	Theo Jongen	3,081	7.0	+1.2
Independent	Doug Behn	1,147	2.6	+0.8
Total formal votes		43,831	98.1	−0.2
Informal votes		870	1.9	+0.2
Turnout		44,701	93.1	
Two-party-preferred result
National	Steve Cansdell	24,470	61.6	+6.3
Labor	Mark Kingsley	15,285	38.4	−6.3
National hold		Swing	+6.3	

=== Coffs Harbour ===
2007 New South Wales state election: Coffs Harbour
Party	Candidate	Votes	%	±%
National	Andrew Fraser	22,351	52.0	+11.8
Labor	David Kennedy	8,898	20.7	−1.0
Independent	Keith Rhoades	6,421	14.9	+4.9
Greens	Rodney Degens	3,205	7.5	+1.5
Christian Democrats	Deborah Lions	1,592	3.7	+0.4
AAFI	Gerry Evic	550	1.3	+1.3
Total formal votes		43,017	98.3	+0.4
Informal votes		738	1.7	−0.4
Turnout		43,755	92.3	
Two-party-preferred result
National	Andrew Fraser	24,884	67.6	+5.7
Labor	David Kennedy	11,914	32.4	−5.7
National hold		Swing	+5.7	

=== Coogee ===
2007 New South Wales state election: Coogee
Party	Candidate	Votes	%	±%
Labor	Paul Pearce	15,623	39.0	−6.9
Liberal	Jonathon Flegg	14,323	35.8	+5.0
Greens	Kelly Marks	8,457	21.1	+3.2
Democrats	Nicole Tillotson	1,138	2.8	+0.5
Unity	Yuan Wu	488	1.2	+0.2
Total formal votes		40,029	97.6	−0.4
Informal votes		989	2.4	+0.4
Turnout		41,018	88.9	
Two-party-preferred result
Labor	Paul Pearce	20,775	57.2	−6.4
Liberal	Jonathon Flegg	15,521	42.8	+6.4
Labor hold		Swing	−6.4	

=== Cronulla ===
2007 New South Wales state election: Cronulla
Party	Candidate	Votes	%	±%
Liberal	Malcolm Kerr	24,339	56.7	+10.7
Labor	Paul Constance	11,195	26.1	−3.1
Greens	Naomi Waizer	2,948	6.9	+1.5
Christian Democrats	Beth Smith	1,963	4.6	+2.1
AAFI	Warren Feinbier	1,299	3.0	+1.2
Independent	John Moffat	1,193	2.8	+2.7
Total formal votes		42,937	97.7	−0.1
Informal votes		1,013	2.3	+0.1
Turnout		43,950	93.4	
Two-party-preferred result
Liberal	Malcolm Kerr	26,363	67.5	+8.7
Labor	Paul Constance	12,708	32.5	−8.7
Liberal hold		Swing	+8.7	

=== Davidson ===
2007 New South Wales state election: Davidson
Party	Candidate	Votes	%	±%
Liberal	Jonathan O'Dea	25,358	60.4	+0.2
Labor	Doug McLeod	7,058	16.8	−3.0
Greens	Jo-Anne Lentern	5,671	13.5	+1.7
Democrats	Clinton Barnes	1,143	2.7	+0.8
Christian Democrats	Bruce York	1,934	4.6	+1.9
AAFI	David Kitson	807	1.9	+0.6
Total formal votes		41,971	97.2	−1.0
Informal votes		1,210	2.8	+1.0
Turnout		43,181	92.0	
Two-party-preferred result
Liberal	Jonathan O'Dea	27,516	74.7	+3.8
Labor	Doug McLeod	9,334	25.3	−3.8
Liberal hold		Swing	+3.8	

=== Drummoyne ===
2007 New South Wales state election: Drummoyne
Party	Candidate	Votes	%	±%
Labor	Angela D'Amore	20,007	47.3	−0.1
Liberal	Greg Long	15,519	36.7	+1.4
Greens	Bernard Rooney	3,995	9.4	+0.8
Independent	Michael Vescio	1,258	3.0	+3.0
Unity	Ozlem Huseyin	694	1.6	+0.1
AAFI	Edeltraud Guener	475	1.1	+0.2
Outdoor Recreation	Peter Stitt	391	0.9	+0.9
Total formal votes		42,339	97.3	−0.1
Informal votes		1,194	2.7	+0.1
Turnout		43,533	93.3	
Two-party-preferred result
Labor	Angela D'Amore	22,509	57.6	−1.1
Liberal	Greg Long	16,559	42.4	+1.1
Labor hold		Swing	−1.1	

=== Dubbo ===
2007 New South Wales state election: Dubbo
Party	Candidate	Votes	%	±%
National	Greg Matthews	18,702	42.6	−1.2
Independent	Dawn Fardell	18,296	41.7	+8.0
Labor	Adrian Hough	4,889	11.1	−4.6
Greens	Jan McDonald	1,074	2.4	−0.3
Christian Democrats	Michael Sichel	952	2.2	+2.1
Total formal votes		43,913	97.8	−0.5
Informal votes		988	2.2	+0.5
Turnout		44,901	94.2	
Notional two-party-preferred count
National	Greg Matthews	22,936	75.0	+4.4
Labor	Adrian Hough	7,648	25.0	−4.4
Two-candidate-preferred result
Independent	Dawn Fardell	20,584	50.9	+0.6
National	Greg Matthews	19,877	49.1	−0.6
Independent hold		Swing	+0.6	

=== East Hills ===
2007 New South Wales state election: East Hills
Party	Candidate	Votes	%	±%
Labor	Alan Ashton	22,190	53.6	−1.6
Liberal	Glenn Brookes	11,352	27.4	+2.7
Christian Democrats	Stephen Chavura	2,724	6.6	+2.7
Greens	Michael Tierney	2,538	6.1	+0.1
AAFI	Francis Dale	1,472	3.6	+2.1
Unity	Andy Truong	1,109	2.7	+0.9
Total formal votes		41,385	96.2	−0.6
Informal votes		1,622	3.8	+0.6
Turnout		43,007	94.2	
Two-party-preferred result
Labor	Alan Ashton	23,921	64.1	−3.8
Liberal	Glenn Brookes	13,417	35.9	+3.8
Labor hold		Swing	−3.8	

=== Epping ===
2007 New South Wales state election: Epping
Party	Candidate	Votes	%	±%
Liberal	Greg Smith	18,283	42.8	−3.7
Labor	Nicole Campbell	11,087	25.9	−2.8
Greens	Lindsay Peters	5,229	12.2	+1.2
Independent	Martin Levine	2,327	5.4	+5.4
Unity	Simon Tam	2,037	4.8	−0.5
Christian Democrats	John Kingsmill	1,807	4.2	−0.1
Democrats	David Havyatt	741	1.7	−0.2
Independent	Christina Metlikovec	717	1.7	+1.7
AAFI	Michael Bergman	528	1.2	−0.6
Total formal votes		42,756	97.6	−0.5
Informal votes		1,066	2.4	+0.5
Turnout		43,822	92.7	
Two-party-preferred result
Liberal	Greg Smith	21,052	58.0	+0.4
Labor	Nicole Campbell	15,253	42.0	−0.4
Liberal hold		Swing	+0.4	

=== Fairfield ===
2007 New South Wales state election: Fairfield
Party	Candidate	Votes	%	±%
Labor	Joe Tripodi	24,767	58.3	−5.7
Liberal	James Conna	9,628	22.7	+4.1
Greens	Lizza Gebilagin	2,637	6.2	+1.1
Christian Democrats	Alex Sharah	2,253	5.3	+4.2
Unity	John Yuen	2,113	5.0	−1.8
AAFI	John Vanderwel	1,099	2.6	+0.9
Total formal votes		42,497	95.1	−0.4
Informal votes		2,171	4.9	+0.4
Turnout		44,668	92.2	
Two-party-preferred result
Labor	Joe Tripodi	26,382	70.4	−6.0
Liberal	James Conna	11,098	29.6	+6.0
Labor hold		Swing	−6.0	

=== Gosford ===
2007 New South Wales state election: Gosford
Party	Candidate	Votes	%	±%
Labor	Marie Andrews	18,448	42.7	−2.8
Liberal	Chris Holstein	15,057	34.8	+3.3
Independent	Debra Wales	3,852	8.9	+8.9
Greens	Hillary Morris	2,977	6.9	+1.6
Christian Democrats	George Grant	1,241	2.9	+2.9
AAFI	Robert Moulds	1,141	2.6	+1.4
Save Our Suburbs	Bryan Ellis	524	1.2	+0.9
Total formal votes		43,240	97.4	−0.4
Informal votes		1,165	2.6	+0.4
Turnout		44,405	93.4	
Two-party-preferred result
Labor	Marie Andrews	20,535	54.9	−3.7
Liberal	Chris Holstein	16,900	45.1	+3.7
Labor notional hold		Swing	−3.7	

=== Goulburn ===
2007 New South Wales state election: Goulburn
Party	Candidate	Votes	%	±%
Liberal	Pru Goward	17,115	39.9	+7.8
Independent	Paul Stephenson	10,603	24.7	+24.7
Labor	Rob Parker	9,695	22.6	−16.4
Greens	Bill Dorman	2,834	6.6	−0.7
Christian Democrats	Geoff Peet	1,817	4.2	+3.6
AAFI	David Hughes	860	2.0	+2.0
Total formal votes		42,924	97.8	−0.4
Informal votes		958	2.2	+0.4
Turnout		43,882	93.7	
Notional two-party-preferred count
Liberal	Pru Goward	20,162	58.6	+4.1
Labor	Rob Parker	14,249	41.4	−4.1
Two-candidate-preferred result
Liberal	Pru Goward	18,769	51.3	−3.2
Independent	Paul Stephenson	17,807	48.7	+48.7
Liberal hold		Swing	−3.2	

=== Granville ===
2007 New South Wales state election: Granville
Party	Candidate	Votes	%	±%
Labor	David Borger	20,178	48.1	−10.7
Liberal	Eddy Sarkis	11,833	28.2	+2.9
Independent	Paul Garrard	3,993	9.5	+9.5
Christian Democrats	Karen Pender	1,874	4.5	+1.0
Greens	Pauline Tyrrell	1,676	4.0	−1.1
Unity	Lily Su	1,623	3.9	+1.6
AAFI	Peter Dowman	752	1.8	+0.4
Total formal votes		41,929	95.9	+0.1
Informal votes		1,801	4.1	−0.1
Turnout		43,730	92.6	
Two-party-preferred result
Labor	David Borger	22,076	61.1	−8.1
Liberal	Eddy Sarkis	14,072	38.9	+8.1
Labor hold		Swing	−8.1	

=== Hawkesbury ===
2007 New South Wales state election: Hawkesbury
Party	Candidate	Votes	%	±%
Liberal	Ray Williams	19,611	45.6	−1.6
Independent	Steven Pringle	11,661	27.1	+27.1
Labor	Alicia McCosker	6,872	16.0	−6.9
Greens	Jocelyn Howden	2,785	6.5	+0.1
AAFI	Gregg Pringle	2,069	4.8	+3.1
Total formal votes		42,998	97.4	−0.1
Informal votes		1,135	2.6	+0.1
Turnout		44,133	94.1	
Notional two-party-preferred count
Liberal	Ray Williams	23,217	69.3	+4.8
Labor	Alicia McCosker	10,273	30.7	−4.8
Two-candidate-preferred result
Liberal	Ray Williams	20,402	56.0	−8.6
Independent	Steven Pringle	16,012	44.0	+44.0
Liberal hold		Swing	−8.6 (Note: In 2003, Hawkesbury was won by Steve Pringle, representing the Liberals on a 14.6% margin against Labor. In 2006, he defected from the Liberals to become an independent.)	

=== Heathcote ===
2007 New South Wales state election: Heathcote
Party	Candidate	Votes	%	±%
Labor	Paul McLeay	18,377	43.2	−4.2
Liberal	Lee Evans	13,712	32.2	+2.5
Greens	Jill Merrin	6,171	14.5	+0.8
Christian Democrats	John Vanderjagt	2,442	5.7	+1.9
AAFI	Mary Kelly	1,865	4.4	+2.2
Total formal votes		42,567	97.8	+0.1
Informal votes		948	2.2	−0.1
Turnout		43,515	94.0	
Two-party-preferred result
Labor	Paul McLeay	22,427	58.8	−3.5
Liberal	Lee Evans	15,745	41.2	+3.5
Labor hold		Swing	−3.5	

=== Heffron ===
2007 New South Wales state election: Heffron
Party	Candidate	Votes	%	±%
Labor	Kristina Keneally	23,066	56.4	+2.0
Liberal	Scott Nash	8,889	21.8	+4.0
Greens	Ben Spies-Butcher	8,031	19.7	+6.9
	James Cogan	875	2.1	+2.1
Total formal votes		40,861	96.3	
Informal votes		1,549	3.7	
Turnout		42,410	89.3	
Two-party-preferred result
Labor	Kristina Keneally	27,371	73.7	−0.5
Liberal	Scott Nash	9,783	26.3	+0.5
Labor hold		Swing	−0.5	

=== Hornsby ===
2007 New South Wales state election: Hornsby
Party	Candidate	Votes	%	±%
Liberal	Judy Hopwood	23,636	52.9	+8.6
Labor	Janelle McIntosh	10,201	22.8	−10.5
Greens	Catherine Turner	4,714	10.5	+1.6
Christian Democrats	Leighton Thew	2,067	4.6	+1.4
Independent	Mick Gallagher	1,389	3.1	+0.1
Unity	Fei Zhou	878	2.0	+0.0
Democrats	Peter Fallon	676	1.5	+0.0
AAFI	Lyndon Shepherd	640	1.4	+0.0
Independent	Ian Johnston	494	1.1	+1.1
Total formal votes		44,695	97.6	−0.3
Informal votes		1,110	2.4	+0.3
Turnout		45,805	93.8	
Two-party-preferred result
Liberal	Judy Hopwood	26,118	66.5	+12.3
Labor	Janelle McIntosh	13,137	33.5	−12.3
Liberal hold		Swing	+12.3	

=== Keira ===
2007 New South Wales state election: Keira
Party	Candidate	Votes	%	±%
Labor	David Campbell	24,513	57.8	+3.0
Liberal	David Moulds	8,701	20.5	+2.5
Greens	Kate Brandreth	5,469	12.9	−2.7
Christian Democrats	George Carfield	2,092	4.9	+0.5
Independent	Marcus Aussie-Stone	924	2.2	+2.2
AAFI	Maria Patakfalvy	680	1.6	−0.6
Total formal votes		42,379	97.6	+1.2
Informal votes		1,026	2.4	−1.2
Turnout		43,405	93.7	
Two-party-preferred result
Labor	David Campbell	27,245	72.0	−1.5
Liberal	David Moulds	10,576	28.0	+1.5
Labor hold		Swing	−1.5	

=== Kiama ===
2007 New South Wales state election: Kiama
Party	Candidate	Votes	%	±%
Labor	Matt Brown	21,971	50.7	+4.1
Liberal	Ann Sudmalis	13,224	30.5	−2.1
Greens	Ben van der Wijngaart	3,759	8.7	−0.6
Christian Democrats	John Kadwell	2,082	4.8	+0.6
Fishing Party	Garth Bridge	1,680	3.9	+3.9
AAFI	Jack Burnett	645	1.5	+0.7
Total formal votes		43,361	98.0	+0.1
Informal votes		902	2.0	−0.1
Turnout		44,263	94.1	
Two-party-preferred result
Labor	Matt Brown	24,910	62.0	+3.7
Liberal	Ann Sudmalis	15,273	38.0	−3.7
Labor hold		Swing	+3.7	

=== Kogarah ===
2007 New South Wales state election: Kogarah
Party	Candidate	Votes	%	±%
Labor	Cherie Burton	24,301	56.8	−2.2
Liberal	Peter El Khouri	11,534	27.0	−0.9
Greens	Therese Bolt	3,042	7.1	+0.5
Unity	Marcus Ho	2,172	5.1	+0.6
Christian Democrats	Chris Svolos	1,708	4.0	+4.0
Total formal votes		42,757	96.8	0.0
Informal votes		1,396	3.2	0.0
Turnout		44,153	93.2	
Two-party-preferred result
Labor	Cherie Burton	26,448	67.7	−1.4
Liberal	Peter El Khouri	12,616	32.3	+1.4
Labor hold		Swing	−1.4	

=== Ku-ring-gai ===
2007 New South Wales state election: Ku-ring-gai
Party	Candidate	Votes	%	±%
Liberal	Barry O'Farrell	27,831	65.6	+7.4
Labor	Adrian Macarthur-King	5,839	13.8	−7.3
Greens	Susie Gemmell	5,592	13.2	+1.2
Christian Democrats	Witold Wiszniewski	1,402	3.3	+0.3
Democrats	Jeannette Tsoulos	1,002	2.4	+0.4
Unity	Michael Sun	790	1.9	−0.9
Total formal votes		42,456	98.0	−0.2
Informal votes		857	2.0	+0.2
Turnout		43,313	92.4	
Two-party-preferred result
Liberal	Barry O'Farrell	29,939	79.0	+10.3
Labor	Adrian Macarthur-King	7,965	21.0	−10.3
Liberal hold		Swing	+10.3	

=== Lake Macquarie ===
2007 New South Wales state election: Lake Macquarie
Party	Candidate	Votes	%	±%
Labor	Jeff Hunter	17,290	40.5	−11.7
Independent	Greg Piper	12,917	30.3	+30.3
Liberal	Ken Paxinos	8,310	19.5	−13.7
Greens	Suzanne Pritchard	2,441	5.7	−2.5
Christian Democrats	Rex Morgan	921	2.2	+1.9
AAFI	Leonard Hodge	770	1.8	−1.0
Total formal votes		42,649	97.7	+0.1
Informal votes		1,005	2.3	−0.1
Turnout		43,654	93.1	
Notional two-party-preferred count
Labor	Jeff Hunter	20,954	65.0	+3.4
Liberal	Ken Paxinos	11,292	35.0	−3.4
Two-candidate-preferred result
Independent	Greg Piper	18,654	50.1	+50.1
Labor	Jeff Hunter	18,548	49.9	−11.7
Independent gain from Labor		Swing	+11.7	

=== Lakemba ===
2007 New South Wales state election: Lakemba
Party	Candidate	Votes	%	±%
Labor	Morris Iemma	31,907	73.9	+9.1
Liberal	Morris Mansour	5,698	13.2	−2.8
Christian Democrats	Josephine Sammut	1,716	4.0	+1.3
Greens	Bashir Sawalha	1,671	3.9	−3.0
Unity	Omar Moussa	1,476	3.4	−1.1
Democrats	Garry Dalrymple	473	1.1	+0.9
	Joanne Kuniansky	237	0.5	+0.5
Total formal votes		43,178	95.8	+0.3
Informal votes		1,902	4.2	−0.3
Turnout		45,080	92.2	
Two-party-preferred result
Labor	Morris Iemma	33,596	84.0	+5.2
Liberal	Morris Mansour	6,415	16.0	−5.2
Labor hold		Swing	+5.2	

=== Lane Cove ===
2007 New South Wales state election: Lane Cove
Party	Candidate	Votes	%	±%
Liberal	Anthony Roberts	21,579	52.3	+6.7
Labor	Gabrielle O'Donnell	10,094	24.4	−8.7
Greens	Shauna Forrest	6,059	14.7	−0.2
Democrats	Kate Botting	1,801	4.4	+1.6
Christian Democrats	Arie Baalbergen	960	2.3	+2.1
Unity	William Ho	806	2.0	−0.1
Total formal votes		41,299	97.4	−0.2
Informal votes		1,113	2.6	+0.2
Turnout		42,412	91.9	
Two-party-preferred result
Liberal	Anthony Roberts	23,365	62.4	+9.6
Labor	Gabrielle O'Donnell	14,101	37.6	−9.6
Liberal hold		Swing	+9.6	

=== Lismore ===
2007 New South Wales state election: Lismore
Party	Candidate	Votes	%	±%
National	Thomas George	23,620	54.2	+3.4
Labor	Peter Lanyon	11,155	25.6	−1.9
Greens	Andy Gough	7,726	17.7	+0.6
Democrats	Julia Melland	1,086	2.5	+1.0
Total formal votes		43,587	98.4	−0.1
Informal votes		698	1.6	+0.1
Turnout		44,285	91.8	
Two-party-preferred result
National	Thomas George	24,505	60.0	+1.8
Labor	Peter Lanyon	16,340	40.0	−1.8
National hold		Swing	+1.8	

=== Liverpool ===
2007 New South Wales state election: Liverpool
Party	Candidate	Votes	%	±%
Labor	Paul Lynch	26,206	64.9	−4.8
Liberal	Ned Mannoun	7,251	18.0	+2.7
Independent	Liliana Ljubicic	2,093	5.2	+5.2
Christian Democrats	Elizabeth Hall	1,686	4.2	+1.7
Greens	Bill Cashman	1,597	4.0	−0.7
AAFI	Ian Gelling	855	2.1	+0.3
Unity	Kek Tai	685	1.7	−0.5
Total formal votes		40,373	95.4	+0.2
Informal votes		1,935	4.6	−0.2
Turnout		42,308	91.6	
Two-party-preferred result
Labor	Paul Lynch	28,036	76.9	−3.7
Liberal	Ned Mannoun	8,410	23.1	+3.7
Labor hold		Swing	−3.7	

=== Londonderry ===
2007 New South Wales state election: Londonderry
Party	Candidate	Votes	%	±%
Labor	Allan Shearan	19,288	47.5	+0.8
Liberal	Bart Bassett	13,957	34.4	+26.0
Greens	Joel Macrae	2,708	6.7	−0.8
Christian Democrats	John Phillips	2,694	6.6	+2.2
AAFI	Ross Dedman	1,936	4.8	−0.6
Total formal votes		40,583	96.1	−0.8
Informal votes		1,655	3.9	+0.8
Turnout		42,238	93.1	
Two-party-preferred result
Labor	Allan Shearan	20,936	56.9	−4.0
Liberal	Bart Bassett	15,834	43.1	+4.0
Labor hold		Swing	−4.0	

=== Macquarie Fields ===
2007 New South Wales state election: Macquarie Fields
Party	Candidate	Votes	%	±%
Labor	Andrew McDonald	21,918	53.0	−10.2
Liberal	Nola Fraser	13,678	33.1	+11.0
Greens	Peter Butler	2,092	5.1	+0.3
Christian Democrats	Hany Gayed	1,806	4.4	+1.2
AAFI	Frank Corrigan	1,160	2.8	+1.0
Independent	Mick Allen	703	1.7	+0.9
Total formal votes		41,357	95.7	−0.1
Informal votes		1,858	4.3	+0.1
Turnout		43,215	92.0	
Two-party-preferred result
Labor	Andrew McDonald	23,359	61.1	−12.2
Liberal	Nola Fraser	14,860	38.9	+12.2
Labor hold		Swing	−12.2	

=== Maitland ===
2007 New South Wales state election: Maitland
Party	Candidate	Votes	%	±%
Labor	Frank Terenzini	17,823	39.7	−9.2
Independent	Peter Blackmore	11,942	26.6	+26.6
Liberal	Bob Geoghegan	9,218	20.5	−11.4
Independent	Kellie Tranter	3,692	8.2	+8.2
Greens	Jan Davis	2,262	5.0	−0.5
Total formal votes		44,937	97.8	0.0
Informal votes		1,013	2.2	0.0
Turnout		45,950	94.9	
Notional two-party-preferred count
Labor	Frank Terenzini	21,692	59.7	−0.6
Liberal	Bob Geoghegan	14,628	40.3	+0.6
Two-candidate-preferred result
Labor	Frank Terenzini	19,989	52.0	−8.3
Independent	Peter Blackmore	18,463	48.0	+48.0
Labor hold		Swing	−8.3	

=== Manly ===
2007 New South Wales state election: Manly
Party	Candidate	Votes	%	±%
Liberal	Mike Baird	18,284	45.1	+4.2
Independent	David Barr	12,655	31.2	−0.8
Labor	Daniel Pearce	3,981	9.8	−3.1
Greens	Sarah Weate	3,931	9.7	+1.2
Independent	Penelope Wynne	660	1.6	+1.6
Christian Democrats	Wally Vanderpoll	573	1.4	+0.4
AAFI	Neil Hamilton	443	1.1	−0.6
Total formal votes		40,527	98.1	+0.1
Informal votes		805	1.9	−0.1
Turnout		41,332	90.6	
Notional two-party-preferred count
Liberal	Mike Baird	20,854	71.8	+7.5
Labor	Daniel Pearce	8,184	28.2	−7.5
Two-candidate-preferred result
Liberal	Mike Baird	19,263	53.4	+4.6
Independent	David Barr	16,842	46.6	−4.6
Liberal gain from Independent		Swing	+4.6	

=== Maroubra ===
2007 New South Wales state election: Maroubra
Party	Candidate	Votes	%	±%
Labor	Michael Daley	22,078	52.9	−10.4
Liberal	Robert Belleli	11,581	27.7	+4.7
Greens	Anne Gardiner	4,972	11.9	+3.1
Independent	Derek Pitman	1,542	3.7	+3.7
Democrats	Kirsten Bennell	958	2.3	+1.0
Unity	Anthony Ayres	634	1.5	−0.5
Total formal votes		41,765	96.6	−0.7
Informal votes		1,452	3.4	+0.7
Turnout		43,217	92.5	
Two-party-preferred result
Labor	Michael Daley	24,183	66.1	−7.4
Liberal	Robert Belleli	12,386	33.9	+7.4
Labor hold		Swing	−7.4	

=== Marrickville ===
2007 New South Wales state election: Marrickville
Party	Candidate	Votes	%	±%
Labor	Carmel Tebbutt	19,683	46.6	−1.1
Greens	Fiona Byrne	13,735	32.5	+4.1
Liberal	Ramzy Mansour	5,305	12.6	−0.2
Independent	Angus Wood	716	1.7	+1.7
Democrats	Martine Eve-Macleod	688	1.6	−0.8
Socialist Alliance	Pip Hinman	666	1.6	−1.0
Christian Democrats	Joseph Tuiletufuga	634	1.5	+1.5
Unity	Grace Chen	557	1.3	−0.8
	Patrick O'Connor	216	0.5	+0.5
Total formal votes		42,200	96.9	0.0
Informal votes		1,340	3.1	0.0
Turnout		43,540	90.5	
Notional two-party-preferred count
Labor	Carmel Tebbutt	28,379	81.2	−0.1
Liberal	Ramzy Mansour	6,557	18.8	+0.1
Two-candidate-preferred result
Labor	Carmel Tebbutt	21,073	57.5	−2.5
Greens	Fiona Byrne	15,588	42.5	+2.5
Labor hold		Swing	−2.5	

=== Menai ===
2007 New South Wales state election: Menai
Party	Candidate	Votes	%	±%
Labor	Alison Megarrity	19,276	45.4	−6.5
Liberal	Steve Simpson	18,100	42.6	+5.4
Greens	Neerav Bhatt	1,915	4.5	−0.5
AAFI	John Collins	1,314	3.1	+3.0
Independent	Chris McLachlan	1,104	2.6	+2.6
Democrats	Mark Clyburn	751	1.8	+0.8
Total formal votes		42,460	97.5	−0.3
Informal votes		1,084	2.5	+0.3
Turnout		43,544	94.1	
Two-party-preferred result
Labor	Alison Megarrity	21,045	52.7	−6.2
Liberal	Steve Simpson	18,912	47.3	+6.2
Labor hold		Swing	−6.2	

=== Miranda ===
2007 New South Wales state election: Miranda
Party	Candidate	Votes	%	±%
Labor	Barry Collier	18,160	42.8	−8.4
Liberal	Graham Annesley	17,993	42.4	+6.1
Greens	Julie Simpson	2,817	6.6	+0.2
Christian Democrats	Albert Young	1,531	3.6	+3.2
AAFI	Samantha Feinbier	924	2.2	+0.5
Independent	John Brett	692	1.6	+1.6
Democrats	Rob Bunt	338	0.8	+0.8
Total formal votes		42,455	98.0	0.0
Informal votes		880	2.0	0.0
Turnout		43,335	94.2	
Two-party-preferred result
Labor	Barry Collier	20,097	50.8	−8.3
Liberal	Graham Annesley	19,494	49.2	+8.3
Labor hold		Swing	−8.3	

=== Monaro ===
2007 New South Wales state election: Monaro
Party	Candidate	Votes	%	±%
Labor	Steve Whan	19,769	47.9	+1.6
National	David Madew	16,244	39.3	−2.3
Greens	Catherine Moore	4,123	10.0	+2.1
Independent	Frank Fragiacomo	1,155	2.8	+2.8
Total formal votes		41,291	97.5	−0.2
Informal votes		1,050	2.5	+0.2
Turnout		42,341	90.9	
Two-party-preferred result
Labor	Steve Whan	21,978	56.3	+1.9
National	David Madew	17,060	43.7	−1.9
Labor hold		Swing	+1.9	

=== Mount Druitt ===
2007 New South Wales state election: Mount Druitt
Party	Candidate	Votes	%	±%
Labor	Richard Amery	25,317	64.0	−2.0
Liberal	George Bilic	7,752	19.6	+1.6
Christian Democrats	Dave Vincent	2,908	7.4	+1.5
Greens	Debbie Robertson	2,040	5.2	+1.5
AAFI	John Newton	1,523	3.9	+1.4
Total formal votes		39,540	95.5	0.0
Informal votes		1,877	4.5	0.0
Turnout		41,417	92.2	
Two-party-preferred result
Labor	Richard Amery	27,201	75.4	−1.4
Liberal	George Bilic	8,892	24.6	+1.4
Labor hold		Swing	−1.4	

=== Mulgoa ===
2007 New South Wales state election: Mulgoa
Party	Candidate	Votes	%	±%
Labor	Diane Beamer	23,097	55.0	−3.1
Liberal	Karen Chijoff	14,835	35.3	+6.7
Greens	Wade Smith	2,065	4.9	+0.8
AAFI	Geoffrey Dakin	2,019	4.8	+2.4
Total formal votes		42,016	96.4	+0.2
Informal votes		1,575	3.6	−0.2
Turnout		43,591	94.2	
Two-party-preferred result
Labor	Diane Beamer	24,261	61.1	−5.5
Liberal	Karen Chijoff	15,432	38.9	+5.5
Labor hold		Swing	−5.5	

=== Murray-Darling ===
2007 New South Wales state election: Murray-Darling
Party	Candidate	Votes	%	±%
National	John Williams	22,918	56.5	+10.6
Labor	Peter Black	15,015	37.0	−6.7
Independent	Tom Kennedy	1,069	2.6	+2.6
Greens	Judy Renner	983	2.4	−0.5
Independent	Ron Page	571	1.4	+1.4
Total formal votes		40,556	97.9	+0.6
Informal votes		868	2.1	−0.6
Turnout		41,424	89.5	
Two-party-preferred result
National	John Williams	23,595	60.1	+8.8
Labor	Peter Black	15,664	39.9	−8.8
National gain from Labor		Swing	+8.8	

Note : In 2003, Labor won Murray Darling on a 6.7% margin, however the subsequent redistribution made it notionally National. Labor officially lost the seat at the 2007 election.

=== Murrumbidgee ===
2007 New South Wales state election: Murrumbidgee
Party	Candidate	Votes	%	±%
National	Adrian Piccoli	26,772	63.2	−2.6
Labor	Michael Kidd	13,496	31.9	+3.5
Greens	Peter Carruthers	2,060	4.9	+0.7
Total formal votes		42,328	97.7	−0.6
Informal votes		978	2.3	+0.6
Turnout		43,306	92.0	
Two-party-preferred result
National	Adrian Piccoli	27,365	66.1	−2.8
Labor	Michael Kidd	14,051	33.9	+2.8
National hold		Swing	−2.8	

=== Myall Lakes ===
2007 New South Wales state election: Myall Lakes
Party	Candidate	Votes	%	±%
National	John Turner	21,640	49.2	+11.2
Labor	Lisa Clancy	8,970	20.4	+0.1
Independent	Eddie Loftus	8,318	18.9	+18.9
Greens	Judy Donnelly	2,640	6.0	+1.7
Independent	John Stephens	1,458	3.3	+3.3
AAFI	Waldron Perry	990	2.2	+1.1
Total formal votes		44,016	98.1	0.0
Informal votes		870	1.9	0.0
Turnout		44,886	93.4	
Two-party-preferred result
National	John Turner	23,779	67.4	+3.5
Labor	Lisa Clancy	11,505	32.6	−3.5
National hold		Swing	+3.5	

=== Newcastle ===
2007 New South Wales state election: Newcastle
Party	Candidate	Votes	%	±%
Labor	Jodi McKay	13,166	31.2	−17.1
Independent	John Tate	10,159	24.1	+24.1
Independent	Bryce Gaudry (Note: Bryce Gaudry was the Labor member for Newcastle from 1991 to 2007. When Jodi McKay was preselected at the request of the Premier, he left Labor and contested the election as an independent.)	8,870	21.0	+21.0
Greens	Michael Osborne	4,729	11.2	−4.2
Liberal	Martin Babakhan	4,129	9.8	−16.4
Christian Democrats	John Lee	535	1.3	−0.4
Independent	Simon Hutabarat	306	0.7	+0.7
Independent	Hilda Armstrong	168	0.4	+0.4
Independent	Noel Holt	110	0.3	+0.3
Total formal votes		42,172	97.6	+0.4
Informal votes		1,033	2.4	−0.4
Turnout		43,205	91.1	
Notional two-party-preferred count
Labor	Jodi McKay	18,627	67.8	+2.5
Liberal	Martin Babakhan	8,833	32.2	−2.5
Two-candidate-preferred result
Labor	Jodi McKay	16,311	51.2	−14.2
Independent	John Tate	15,524	48.8	+48.8
Labor hold		Swing	N/A	

=== North Shore ===
2007 New South Wales state election: North Shore
Party	Candidate	Votes	%	±%
Liberal	Jillian Skinner	22,531	53.4	+3.5
Greens	Lynne Saville	7,553	17.9	+2.4
Labor	Tabitha Winton	7,523	17.8	−7.1
Independent	Jim Reid	3,080	7.3	+0.9
Democrats	Jan De Voogd	781	1.9	+0.2
Christian Democrats	David Brock	720	1.7	+1.7
Total formal votes		42,188	97.9	−0.6
Informal votes		926	2.1	+0.6
Turnout		43,114	89.0	
Notional two-party-preferred count
Liberal	Jillian Skinner	24,911	69.2	+7.1
Labor	Tabitha Winton	11,099	30.8	–7.1
Two-candidate-preferred result
Liberal	Jillian Skinner	24,299	65.8	+3.7
Greens	Lynne Saville	12,602	34.2	+34.2
Liberal hold		Swing	+3.7	

=== Northern Tablelands ===
2007 New South Wales state election: Northern Tablelands
Party	Candidate	Votes	%	±%
Independent	Richard Torbay	32,615	72.7	+8.8
National	Phillip Kelly	7,951	17.7	−2.1
Labor	Phil Usher	1,947	4.3	−2.0
Greens	Vanessa Bible	1,418	3.2	−0.7
Christian Democrats	Isabel Strutt	904	2.0	+0.0
Total formal votes		44,835	99.0	+0.1
Informal votes		442	1.0	−0.1
Turnout		45,277	93.0	
Notional two-party-preferred count
National	Phillip Kelly	13,256	68.8	+5.4
Labor	Phil Usher	6,019	31.2	−5.4
Two-candidate-preferred result
Independent	Richard Torbay	34,420	80.2	+0.3
National	Phillip Kelly	8,471	19.8	−0.3
Independent hold		Swing	+0.2	

=== Oatley ===
2007 New South Wales state election: Oatley
Party	Candidate	Votes	%	±%
Labor	Kevin Greene	22,213	52.4	−0.1
Liberal	Roger Gray	12,149	28.7	−2.1
Unity	Nancy Liu	2,086	4.9	+0.3
Greens	Paul Gage	1,880	4.4	−1.6
Christian Democrats	Martin Baker	1,786	4.2	+3.9
Independent	Michele Adair	1,291	3.0	+0.2
AAFI	John McGrath	679	1.6	+0.3
Independent	Greg Briscoe-Hough	306	0.7	+0.5
Total formal votes		42,390	97.3	−0.3
Informal votes		1,154	2.7	+0.3
Turnout		43,544	93.4	
Two-party-preferred result
Labor	Kevin Greene	23,960	64.4	+0.2
Liberal	Roger Gray	13,271	35.6	−0.2
Labor notional hold		Swing	+0.2	

=== Orange ===
2007 New South Wales state election: Orange
Party	Candidate	Votes	%	±%
National	Russell Turner	22,034	50.6	+7.3
Independent	John Davis	10,303	23.6	+23.6
Labor	Kevin Duffy	8,937	20.5	−13.2
Greens	Jeremy Buckingham	2,295	5.3	+0.4
Total formal votes		43,569	98.0	0.0
Informal votes		874	2.0	0.0
Turnout		44,443	94.0	
Notional two-party-preferred count
National	Russell Turner	24,563	67.2	+11.3
Labor	Kevin Duffy	12,012	32.8	−11.3
Two-candidate-preferred result
National	Russell Turner	23,769	61.7	+5.8
Independent	John Davis	14,766	38.3	+38.3
National hold		Swing	+5.8	

=== Oxley ===
2007 New South Wales state election: Oxley
Party	Candidate	Votes	%	±%
National	Andrew Stoner	24,750	59.1	+8.0
Labor	Stuart Holmes	10,452	25.0	−5.9
Greens	Gabrielle Tindall	4,480	10.7	+1.0
AAFI	Brian Gardyne	1,265	3.0	+3.0
Democrats	Sherry Stumm	929	2.2	+2.2
Total formal votes		41,876	97.8	−0.1
Informal votes		931	2.2	+0.1
Turnout		42,807	92.5	
Two-party-preferred result
National	Andrew Stoner	25,657	65.9	+6.0
Labor	Stuart Holmes	13,261	34.1	−6.0
National hold		Swing	+6.0	

=== Parramatta ===
2007 New South Wales state election: Parramatta
Party	Candidate	Votes	%	±%
Labor	Tanya Gadiel	21,110	51.4	+1.2
Liberal	John Chedid	11,844	28.8	+0.9
Greens	Tim Hendry	2,742	6.7	−0.3
Christian Democrats	Doug Morrison	2,220	5.4	+2.2
Unity	Ada Wong	1,625	4.0	+0.2
AAFI	John Mansfield	797	1.9	+1.6
Democrats	Robert McFarlane	750	1.8	+0.3
Total formal votes		41,088	96.9	−0.3
Informal votes		1,296	3.1	+0.3
Turnout		42,384	91.5	
Two-party-preferred result
Labor	Tanya Gadiel	23,537	63.7	+0.1
Liberal	John Chedid	13,399	36.3	−0.1
Labor hold		Swing	+0.1	

=== Penrith ===
2007 New South Wales state election: Penrith
Party	Candidate	Votes	%	±%
Labor	Karyn Paluzzano	19,983	48.7	+2.3
Liberal	Tricia Hitchen	13,368	32.6	−3.0
Christian Democrats	Andrew Green	2,544	6.2	+3.4
Greens	Suzie Wright	2,285	5.6	−0.3
Independent	Geoff Brown	1,468	3.6	+3.6
AAFI	Andrew Mavin	1,052	2.6	+1.0
Democrats	Geraldine Waters	365	0.9	+0.0
Total formal votes		41,065	97.3	+0.3
Informal votes		1,151	2.7	−0.3
Turnout		42,216	93.7	
Two-party-preferred result
Labor	Karyn Paluzzano	22,020	59.2	+2.6
Liberal	Tricia Hitchen	15,146	40.8	−2.6
Labor hold		Swing	+2.6	

=== Pittwater ===
2007 New South Wales state election: Pittwater
Party	Candidate	Votes	%	±%
Liberal	Rob Stokes	20,807	50.3	−10.0
Independent	Alex McTaggart	11,107	26.9	+26.9
Greens	Craige McWhirter	4,039	9.8	−4.3
Labor	Pat Boydell	3,046	7.4	−11.6
Christian Democrats	Patricia Giles	1,350	3.3	+0.5
AAFI	Charles Byrne	648	1.6	+0.2
Democrats	Mario Nicotra	363	0.9	−1.3
Total formal votes		41,360	97.8	−0.2
Informal votes		912	2.2	+0.2
Turnout		42,272	92.3	
Notional two-party-preferred count
Liberal	Rob Stokes	24,654	79.8	+9.6
Labor	Pat Boydell	6,256	20.2	−9.6
Two-candidate-preferred result
Liberal	Rob Stokes	22,109	59.4	−10.7
Independent	Alex McTaggart	15,123	40.6	+40.6
Liberal hold		Swing	−10.7 (Note: Pittwater was won by an independent in a 2005 by-election and the shown swing is based on the 2003 election when it was won by the Liberals.)	

=== Port Macquarie ===
2007 New South Wales state election: Port Macquarie
Party	Candidate	Votes	%	±%
Independent	Rob Oakeshott	28,523	67.1	+3.2
National	Leslie Williams	8,258	19.4	+0.9
Labor	Monica Hayes	3,886	9.1	−0.8
Greens	Susie Russell	1,170	2.8	−1.0
AAFI	Frank Reid	648	1.5	+0.9
Total formal votes		42,485	98.7	+0.1
Informal votes		542	1.3	−0.1
Turnout		43,027	93.5	
Notional two-party-preferred count
National	Leslie Williams	12,502	62.9	+5.3
Labor	Monica Hayes	7,369	37.1	−5.3
Two-candidate-preferred result
Independent	Rob Oakeshott	31,107	78.2	−3.7
National	Leslie Williams	8,661	21.8	+3.7
Independent hold		Swing	−3.7	

=== Port Stephens ===
2007 New South Wales state election: Port Stephens
Party	Candidate	Votes	%	±%
Liberal	Craig Baumann	17,881	42.5	+8.7
Labor	Jim Arneman	17,536	41.7	−6.2
Greens	Charmian Eckersley	2,541	6.0	−0.3
Fishing Party	Paul Hennelly	1,972	4.7	+4.7
Christian Democrats	Margaret Higgins	1,235	2.9	+1.4
AAFI	Lawrence Wood	912	2.2	+2.1
Total formal votes		42,077	97.4	−0.2
Informal votes		1,141	2.6	+0.2
Turnout		43,218	93.3	
Two-party-preferred result
Liberal	Craig Baumann	19,369	50.1	+7.3
Labor	Jim Arneman	19,301	49.9	−7.3
Liberal gain from Labor		Swing	+7.3	

=== Riverstone ===
2007 New South Wales state election: Riverstone
Party	Candidate	Votes	%	±%
Labor	John Aquilina	23,809	53.6	+0.8
Liberal	Kevin Conolly	15,589	35.1	+9.1
Greens	Sheryl Jarecki	1,918	4.3	−0.3
Independent	Tony Pettitt	1,607	3.6	+3.6
AAFI	Ronald Atkins	1,474	3.3	+1.1
Total formal votes		44,397	97.1	+0.2
Informal votes		1,346	2.9	−0.2
Turnout		45,743	93.8	
Two-party-preferred result
Labor	John Aquilina	24,925	60.1	−3.3
Liberal	Kevin Conolly	16,568	39.9	+3.3
Labor hold		Swing	−3.3	

=== Rockdale ===
2007 New South Wales state election: Rockdale
Party	Candidate	Votes	%	±%
Labor	Frank Sartor	20,891	50.2	+0.7
Liberal	Lili Gestakovska	13,864	33.3	+9.2
Greens	Liam McGillicuddy	3,139	7.5	+1.1
Independent	Brian Walsh	1,672	4.0	+4.0
Unity	Gang Wang	1,036	2.5	+0.8
	Amin Abbas	533	1.3	+1.3
Save Our Suburbs	Lesleyanne Azel	461	1.1	+0.3
Total formal votes		41,596	95.8	−0.3
Informal votes		1,816	4.2	+0.3
Turnout		43,412	93.1	
Two-party-preferred result
Labor	Frank Sartor	22,486	60.3	−5.5
Liberal	Lili Gestakovska	14,807	39.7	+5.5
Labor hold		Swing	−5.5	

=== Ryde ===
2007 New South Wales state election: Ryde
Party	Candidate	Votes	%	±%
Labor	John Watkins	18,780	44.8	−8.9
Liberal	Vic Tagg	11,979	28.6	−2.1
Independent	Ivan Petch	3,539	8.4	+8.4
Greens	Peter Bell	3,297	7.9	+0.6
Christian Democrats	Robyn Peebles	1,532	3.7	+0.9
Unity	Kevin Chin	1,510	3.6	+0.0
AAFI	Furgen Gruener	660	1.6	+1.5
Democrats	Peter Goldfinch	588	1.4	−0.4
Total formal votes		41,885	97.4	−0.3
Informal votes		1,103	2.6	+0.3
Turnout		42,988	93.0	
Two-party-preferred result
Labor	John Watkins	22,060	60.1	−4.7
Liberal	Vic Tagg	14,654	39.9	+4.7
Labor hold		Swing	−4.7	

=== Shellharbour ===
2007 New South Wales state election: Shellharbour
Party	Candidate	Votes	%	±%
Labor	Lylea McMahon	24,718	57.8	−3.0
Independent	Alex Darling	7,409	17.3	+17.3
Liberal	Stuart Wright	6,307	14.8	−0.9
Greens	Sonya McKay	3,242	7.6	−0.4
AAFI	Tibor Patakfalvy	1,076	2.5	+1.0
Total formal votes		42,752	96.7	+0.2
Informal votes		1,445	3.3	−0.2
Turnout		44,197	94.3	
Notional two-party-preferred count
Labor	Lylea McMahon	27,272	76.8	N/A
Liberal	Stuart Wright	8,236	23.2	N/A
Two-candidate-preferred result
Labor	Lylea McMahon	26,430	71.6	−5.2
Independent	Alex Darling	10,473	28.4	+28.4
Labor notional hold		Swing	−5.2	

=== Smithfield ===
2007 New South Wales state election: Smithfield
Party	Candidate	Votes	%	±%
Labor	Ninos Khoshaba	22,921	52.4	−13.8
Liberal	Andrew Rohan	12,053	27.5	+7.4
Greens	Vlaudin Vega	3,587	8.2	+3.6
Christian Democrats	Liam Pender	2,373	5.4	+2.6
AAFI	Alexander Pini	1,500	3.4	+2.8
Unity	Minh Phu	1,329	3.0	+0.5
Total formal votes		43,763	95.2	−0.6
Informal votes		2,188	4.8	+0.6
Turnout		45,951	94.3	
Two-party-preferred result
Labor	Ninos Khoshaba	24,959	65.5	−10.4
Liberal	Andrew Rohan	13,171	34.5	+10.4
Labor hold		Swing	−10.4	

=== South Coast ===
2007 New South Wales state election: South Coast
Party	Candidate	Votes	%	±%
Liberal	Shelley Hancock	21,111	49.0	+10.6
Labor	Michelle Miran	14,183	32.9	−2.9
Greens	Amanda Findley	3,973	9.2	+3.2
Christian Democrats	Paul Green	2,733	6.3	+3.9
AAFI	Rex Dobson	1,050	2.4	+2.4
Total formal votes		43,050	98.0	+0.1
Informal votes		900	2.0	−0.1
Turnout		43,950	93.1	
Two-party-preferred result
Liberal	Shelley Hancock	23,167	57.8	+6.2
Labor	Michelle Miran	16,921	42.2	−6.2
Liberal hold		Swing	+6.2	

=== Strathfield ===
2007 New South Wales state election: Strathfield
Party	Candidate	Votes	%	±%
Labor	Virginia Judge	21,717	52.1	+0.5
Liberal	Bill Carney	12,232	29.4	−0.3
Greens	Michele Sacco	3,894	9.3	+0.4
Unity	Benjamin Cai	1,874	4.5	−1.7
Christian Democrats	John Maloney	1,384	3.3	+3.1
Democrats	Patrick Garson	563	1.4	−0.1
Total formal votes		41,664	97.4	+0.1
Informal votes		1,130	2.6	−0.1
Turnout		42,794	91.7	
Two-party-preferred result
Labor	Virginia Judge	24,883	65.1	−0.1
Liberal	Bill Carney	13,349	34.9	+0.1
Labor hold		Swing	−0.1	

=== Swansea ===
2007 New South Wales state election: Swansea
Party	Candidate	Votes	%	±%
Labor	Robert Coombs	19,979	45.9	−11.4
Liberal	Garry Edwards	10,345	23.8	−4.5
Independent	Laurie Coghlan	6,453	14.8	+14.8
Greens	Sue Wynn	3,739	8.6	+2.3
Christian Democrats	Jill Wood	1,413	3.2	+2.8
AAFI	Barbara Abrahams	1,038	2.4	+0.5
Democrats	Peter Lee	574	1.3	−1.1
Total formal votes		43,541	97.1	−0.4
Informal votes		1,311	2.9	+0.4
Turnout		44,852	94.2	
Two-party-preferred result
Labor	Robert Coombs	22,828	60.8	−6.3
Liberal	Garry Edwards	14,741	39.2	+6.3
Labor hold		Swing	−6.3	

=== Sydney ===
2007 New South Wales state election: Sydney
Party	Candidate	Votes	%	±%
Independent	Clover Moore	16,316	39.6	+7.2
Liberal	Edward Mandla	8,877	21.6	+1.0
Labor	Linda Scott	8,235	20.0	−6.7
Greens	Chris Harris	6,407	15.6	+0.3
Independent	Malcolm Duncan	735	1.8	+1.3
Unity	Imanuel Choyce	614	1.5	+1.1
Total formal votes		41,184	97.8	−0.1
Informal votes		910	2.2	+0.1
Turnout		42,094	84.1	
Notional two-party-preferred count
Labor	Linda Scott	15,184	56.9	−6.5
Liberal	Edward Mandla	11,523	43.1	+6.5
Two-candidate-preferred result
Independent	Clover Moore	20,364	66.6	+1.6
Labor	Linda Scott	10,193	33.4	−1.6
Independent notional hold		Swing	+1.6	

=== Tamworth ===
2007 New South Wales state election: Tamworth
Party	Candidate	Votes	%	±%
Independent	Peter Draper	20,531	46.2	+10.2
National	Kevin Anderson	17,912	40.3	+1.0
Labor	Denise McHugh	3,813	8.6	−4.5
Christian Democrats	Neville Mammen	963	2.2	−2.0
Greens	Bruce Taylor	537	1.2	−0.8
AAFI	Norman Parsons	435	1.0	+1.0
	Stan Heuston	209	0.5	+0.5
Total formal votes		44,400	98.8	+0.3
Informal votes		527	1.2	−0.3
Turnout		44,927	94.8	
Notional two-party-preferred count
National	Kevin Anderson	22,429	74.9	+5.7
Labor	Denise McHugh	7,521	25.1	−5.7
Two-candidate-preferred result
Independent	Peter Draper	22,690	54.8	+2.9
National	Kevin Anderson	18,721	45.2	−2.9
Independent hold		Swing	+2.9	

=== Terrigal ===
2007 New South Wales state election: Terrigal
Party	Candidate	Votes	%	±%
Liberal	Chris Hartcher	20,857	49.9	+3.6
Labor	Deborah O'Neill	14,211	34.0	−8.7
Greens	Terry Jones	3,595	8.6	+1.3
Christian Democrats	Mark McAllan	1,272	3.0	+2.8
AAFI	Kay Hayes	915	2.2	+2.1
Outdoor Recreation	David Begg	501	1.2	+1.2
Save Our Suburbs	Mark Ellis	435	1.0	−0.3
Total formal votes		41,786	97.8	−0.4
Informal votes		942	2.2	+0.4
Turnout		42,728	93.3	
Two-party-preferred result
Liberal	Chris Hartcher	22,374	58.4	+7.8
Labor	Deborah O'Neill	15,907	41.6	−7.8
Liberal notional hold		Swing	+7.8	

=== The Entrance ===
2007 New South Wales state election: The Entrance
Party	Candidate	Votes	%	±%
Labor	Grant McBride	20,239	47.5	−2.6
Liberal	Phil Walker	16,954	39.8	+6.2
Greens	Kerryn Parry-Jones	3,763	8.8	+3.5
AAFI	Maria Overend	1,663	3.9	+2.5
Total formal votes		42,619	97.4	−0.4
Informal votes		1,122	2.6	+0.4
Turnout		43,741	93.2	
Two-party-preferred result
Labor	Grant McBride	21,762	54.9	−4.8
Liberal	Phil Walker	17,907	45.1	+4.8
Labor hold		Swing	−4.8	

=== Toongabbie ===
2007 New South Wales state election: Toongabbie
Party	Candidate	Votes	%	±%
Labor	Nathan Rees	22,533	51.7	−4.7
Liberal	Kirsty Lloyd	12,030	27.6	+0.4
Christian Democrats	Sam Baissari	3,457	7.9	+3.2
Greens	Doug Williamson	2,983	6.8	+2.0
AAFI	Norman Carey	1,713	3.9	+1.4
Unity	Chuan Ren	848	1.9	+0.7
Total formal votes		43,564	96.0	−0.8
Informal votes		1,802	4.0	+0.8
Turnout		45,366	95.9	
Two-party-preferred result
Labor	Nathan Rees	24,967	64.5	−2.2
Liberal	Kirsty Lloyd	13,758	35.5	+2.2
Labor notional hold		Swing	−2.2	

=== Tweed ===
2007 New South Wales state election: Tweed
Party	Candidate	Votes	%	±%
National	Geoff Provest	18,585	46.2	+4.6
Labor	Neville Newell	15,531	38.6	−7.1
Greens	Tom Tabart	3,116	7.7	+0.2
Independent	Gavin Lawrie	1,225	3.0	+3.0
Independent	Julie Boyd	1,222	3.0	+3.0
AAFI	Will King	540	1.3	+1.3
Total formal votes		40,219	97.7	−0.3
Informal votes		950	2.3	+0.3
Turnout		41,169	90.4	
Two-party-preferred result
National	Geoff Provest	19,435	53.0	+7.1
Labor	Neville Newell	17,257	47.0	−7.1
National gain from Labor		Swing	+7.1	

=== Upper Hunter ===
2007 New South Wales state election: Upper Hunter
Party	Candidate	Votes	%	±%
National	George Souris	26,342	60.2	+16.9
Labor	Jennifer Lecky	13,685	31.3	−4.4
Greens	Bev Smiles	3,731	8.5	+2.9
Total formal votes		43,758	97.9	−0.2
Informal votes		939	2.1	+0.2
Turnout		44,697	94.1	
Two-party-preferred result
National	George Souris	27,189	64.7	+7.4
Labor	Jennifer Lecky	14,807	35.3	−7.4
National hold		Swing	+7.4	

=== Vaucluse ===
2007 New South Wales state election: Vaucluse
Party	Candidate	Votes	%	±%
Liberal	Peter Debnam	24,377	59.9	+6.1
Greens	David Shoebridge	8,319	20.4	+3.7
Labor	Alison Rahill	7,992	19.6	−5.8
Total formal votes		40,688	97.2	−0.6
Informal votes		1,170	2.8	+0.6
Turnout		41,858	88.7	
Notional two-party-preferred count
Liberal	Peter Debnam	25,445	67.9	+7.0
Labor	Alison Rahill	12,055	32.1	–7.0
Two-candidate-preferred result
Liberal	Peter Debnam	24,986	66.1	+5.2
Greens	David Shoebridge	12,842	33.9	+33.9
Liberal hold		Swing	+5.2	

=== Wagga Wagga ===
2007 New South Wales state election: Wagga Wagga
Party	Candidate	Votes	%	±%
Liberal	Daryl Maguire	25,750	59.1	+10.6
Labor	Glenn Elliott-Rudder	14,196	32.6	−0.2
Greens	Ray Goodlass	3,661	8.4	+2.9
Total formal votes		43,607	97.9	−0.2
Informal votes		947	2.1	+0.2
Turnout		44,554	93.2	
Two-party-preferred result
Liberal	Daryl Maguire	26,453	63.0	+0.3
Labor	Glenn Elliott-Rudder	15,506	37.0	−0.3
Liberal hold		Swing	+0.4	

=== Wakehurst ===
2007 New South Wales state election: Wakehurst
Party	Candidate	Votes	%	±%
Liberal	Brad Hazzard	24,488	56.9	+8.9
Labor	Patricio Chavez	10,305	24.0	+0.3
Greens	Conny Harris	5,436	12.6	+2.2
Democrats	Georgina Johanson	1,528	3.6	+2.2
AAFI	Thomas Moody	1,249	2.9	+1.3
Total formal votes		43,006	96.9	+0.1
Informal votes		1,389	3.1	−0.1
Turnout		44,395	92.4	
Two-party-preferred result
Liberal	Brad Hazzard	25,980	67.3	+4.1
Labor	Patricio Chavez	12,628	32.7	−4.1
Liberal hold		Swing	+4.1	

=== Wallsend ===
2007 New South Wales state election: Wallsend
Party	Candidate	Votes	%	±%
Labor	Sonia Hornery	21,607	51.0	−4.4
Liberal	James Herington	10,737	25.4	+2.5
Greens	Keith Parsons	5,145	12.2	+2.7
Fishing Party	Dallas Davies	2,857	6.7	+6.7
Christian Democrats	Milton Caine	1,989	4.7	+2.0
Total formal votes		42,335	96.8	−0.3
Informal votes		1,378	3.2	+0.3
Turnout		43,713	94.2	
Two-party-preferred result
Labor	Sonia Hornery	24,690	65.8	−4.0
Liberal	James Herington	12,834	34.2	+4.0
Labor hold		Swing	−4.0	

=== Willoughby ===
2007 New South Wales state election: Willoughby
Party	Candidate	Votes	%	±%
Liberal	Gladys Berejiklian	20,998	50.2	+13.5
Independent	Pat Reilly	7,456	17.8	−5.6
Labor	Linda Beattie	6,354	15.2	−6.5
Greens	Mike Steel	4,683	11.2	+0.3
Unity	Cherie Kam	1,189	2.8	−1.1
Christian Democrats	Esther Heng	699	1.7	+0.4
Democrats	Roy Day	478	1.1	−0.4
Total formal votes		41,857	97.7	−0.4
Informal votes		985	2.3	+0.4
Turnout		42,842	90.6	
Notional two-party-preferred count
Liberal	Gladys Berejiklian	23,717	71.0	+14.0
Labor	Linda Beattie	9,709	29.0	−14.0
Two-candidate-preferred result
Liberal	Gladys Berejiklian	22,679	64.5	
Independent	Pat Reilly	12,496	35.5	
Liberal hold		Swing	N/A (Note: The redistribution made it too difficult to calculate the Liberal-Independent swing.)	

=== Wollondilly ===
2007 New South Wales state election: Wollondilly
Party	Candidate	Votes	%	±%
Labor	Phil Costa	18,652	44.3	−2.4
Liberal	Sharryn Hilton	16,524	39.2	−0.3
Independent	Danny Stewart	3,069	7.3	+7.3
Greens	Geraldine Hunt	2,931	7.0	+0.9
Independent	Maurice Nelmes	926	2.2	+2.2
Total formal votes		42,102	96.4	−0.8
Informal votes		1,577	3.6	+0.8
Turnout		43,679	93.9	
Two-party-preferred result
Labor	Phil Costa	20,803	53.3	−1.3
Liberal	Sharryn Hilton	18,226	46.7	+1.3
Labor notional hold		Swing	−1.3	

=== Wollongong ===
2007 New South Wales state election: Wollongong
Party	Candidate	Votes	%	±%
Labor	Noreen Hay	25,393	58.4	+9.5
Liberal	Colin Fowler	7,306	16.8	+6.5
Greens	Trevor Jones	4,263	9.8	−2.0
Christian Democrats	Clarrie Pratt	2,456	5.6	+2.2
Independent	Lenny Fares	1,983	4.6	+4.6
AAFI	Michael Chehoff	812	1.9	+0.0
Democrats	Madeleine Roberts	703	1.6	+1.6
Socialist Alliance	Jess Moore	591	1.4	+1.4
Total formal votes		43,507	96.2	+0.2
Informal votes		1,710	3.8	−0.2
Turnout		45,217	92.8	
Two-party-preferred result
Labor	Noreen Hay	27,882	75.3	−1.6
Liberal	Colin Fowler	9,154	24.7	+1.6
Labor hold		Swing	−1.6	

=== Wyong ===
2007 New South Wales state election: Wyong
Party	Candidate	Votes	%	±%
Labor	David Harris	18,006	42.5	−12.6
Liberal	Ben Morton	13,363	31.6	−1.5
Independent	Greg Best	6,058	14.3	+14.3
Greens	Scott Rickard	2,138	5.0	+0.1
AAFI	Richard Spark	1,627	3.8	+2.3
Christian Democrats	Adrian Loel	1,151	2.7	+0.5
Total formal votes		42,343	97.2	−0.4
Informal votes		1,204	2.8	+0.4
Turnout		43,547	93.5	
Two-party-preferred result
Labor	David Harris	20,217	56.9	−5.4
Liberal	Ben Morton	15,342	43.1	+5.4
Labor hold		Swing	–5.4	

== See also ==
- Candidates of the 2007 New South Wales state election
- Members of the New South Wales Legislative Assembly, 2007–2011
