= Candidates of the 2007 New South Wales state election =

This article provides details on candidates preselected for the 2007 New South Wales state election which was held on 24 March 2007.

== Retiring MPs ==
=== Labor ===
- John Bartlett MLA (Port Stephens) – retiring.
- Steven Chaytor MLA (Macquarie Fields) – resigned following his (later overturned) conviction for assault of his partner.
- Paul Crittenden MLA (Wyong) – retiring.
- Bob Debus MLA (Blue Mountains) – retiring.
- John Mills MLA (Wallsend) – retiring.
- Sandra Nori MLA (Port Jackson) – retiring.
- Milton Orkopoulos MLA (Swansea) – forced to resign following his arrest on charges of offences against minors.
- John Price MLA (Maitland) – retiring.
- Carl Scully MLA (Smithfield) – retiring.
- Kim Yeadon MLA (Granville) – retiring.
- Meredith Burgmann MLC – retiring.
- Jan Burnswoods MLC – retiring.

=== Liberal ===
- Andrew Humpherson MLA (Davidson) – retiring.
- Andrew Tink MLA (Epping) – retiring.
- Peta Seaton MLA (Southern Highlands) – retiring.
- John Ryan MLC – retiring.

=== National ===
- Ian Armstrong MLA (Lachlan) – retiring.
- Ian Slack-Smith MLA (Barwon) – retiring.

=== Other ===
- Jon Jenkins MLC (Outdoor Recreation) – resigned some weeks before the election.
- David Oldfield MLC (Independent, formerly One Nation) – retiring.
- Peter Wong MLC (Unity) – retiring.

== Legislative Assembly ==
Sitting members are shown in bold text. Successful candidates are highlighted in the relevant colour. Where there is possible confusion, an asterisk (*) is also used.

Electorate	Held by	Labor candidate	Coalition candidate	Greens candidate	CDP candidate	Democrats candidate	Other candidates
Albury	Liberal	Chris Ryan	**Greg Aplin** (Lib)	Chris Sobey			
Auburn	Labor	**Barbara Perry**	George Pierides (Lib)	Malikeh Michaels	Allan Lotfizadeh	Silma Ihram	Jack Au (Unity); Mamdouh Habib (Ind); Bob Vinnicombe (-)
Ballina	National	Melanie Doriean	**Don Page** (Nat)	John Bailey		Ben Smith	Flora Boyd (AAFI)
Balmain	Labor	Verity Firth	Peter Shmigel (Lib)	Rochelle Porteous		Edward Okulicz	Jane Hyde (Ind); Jane Ward (Ind)
Bankstown	Labor	**Tony Stewart**	Mark Majewski (Lib)	Simon Brooks	Zarif Abdulla		Lynette Rogers (AAFI); Shawky Salah (Unity)
Barwon	National	Meryl Dillon	Kevin Humphries (Nat)	Darren Bodell	Heath Wilson		Tim Horan (Ind); Les Paul (Ind)
Bathurst	Labor	**Gerard Martin**	Susan Williams (Nat)	Sebria Lawrence			Ray Thompson (Ind)
Baulkham Hills	Liberal	Tony Hay	**Wayne Merton** (Lib)	Mark Rodowicz	Godwin Goh		Yan Li (Unity); Gregory Piol (AAFI)
Bega	Liberal	Wilma Chinnock	**Andrew Constance** (Lib)	Margaret Perger	Wess Buckley		David Hede (Ind); Philip Hodge (AAFI)
Blacktown	Labor	**Paul Gibson**	Mark Spencer (Lib)	John Forrester	Bernie Gesling		F Ivor (Ind); Bill Jiang (Unity); Donald McNaught (AAFI)
Blue Mountains	Labor	Phil Koperberg	Michael Paag (Lib)	Pippa McInnes			Robert Dwight (AAFI); Robert Stock (Ind); Bob Wilcox (ORP)
Burrinjuck	National	Jessica Forde	**Katrina Hodgkinson** (Nat)	Iain Fyfe			
Cabramatta	Labor	**Reba Meagher**	Victor Smith (Lib)	Rodrigo Gutierrez			Andrew Su (Unity)
Camden	Labor	**Geoff Corrigan**	Chris Patterson (Lib)	Allen Powell	Judy Morris		Leon Belgrave (Ind); Chris Bowen (AAFI); Chris Buchtmann (Ind); Katryna Thirup (Ind)
Campbelltown	Labor	**Graham West**	Stacey Copas (Lib)	Victoria Waldron-Hahn	David Wright		Colin Marsh (AAFI)
Canterbury	Labor	**Linda Burney**	Philip Mansour (Lib)	Christine Donayre	Ehab Hennien		Alan Cronin (AAFI); Jing Ren (Unity)
Castle Hill	Liberal	Alex Mustafa	**Michael Richardson** (Lib)	Carol Flanagan	Darryl Allen		Mervyn Foley (AAFI); Sheng Lin (Unity)
Cessnock	Labor	**Kerry Hickey**	Trevor Hollingshed (Nat)	James Ryan			
Charlestown	Labor	**Matthew Morris**	Lindsay Paterson (Lib)	Jane Smith	Jim Kendall		Paul Scarfe (Ind)
Clarence	National	Mark Kingsley	**Steve Cansdell** (Nat)	Theo Jongen			Doug Behn (Ind); Craig Howe (Ind)
Coffs Harbour	National	David Kennedy	**Andrew Fraser** (Nat)	Rodney Degens	Deborah Lions		Gerry Evic (AAFI); Keith Rhoades (Ind)
Coogee	Labor	**Paul Pearce**	Jonathon Flegg (Lib)	Kelly Marks		Nicole Tillotson	Yuan Wu (Unity)
Cronulla	Liberal	Paul Constance	**Malcolm Kerr** (Lib)	Naomi Waizer	Beth Smith		Warren Feinbier (AAFI); John Moffat (Ind)
Davidson	Liberal	Doug McLeod	Jonathan O'Dea (Lib)	Jo-Anne Lentern	Bruce York	Clinton Barnes	David Kitson (AAFI)
Drummoyne	Labor	**Angela D'Amore**	Greg Long (Lib)	Bernard Rooney			Edeltraud Gruener (AAFI); Ozlem Huseyin (Unity); Peter Stitt (ORP); Michael Vescio (Ind)
Dubbo	Independent	Adrian Hough	Greg Matthews (Nat)	Jan McDonald	Michael Sichel		**Dawn Fardell** (Ind)
East Hills	Labor	**Alan Ashton**	Glenn Brookes (Lib)	Michael Tierney	Stephen Chavura		Francis Dale (AAFI); Andy Truong (Unity)
Epping	Liberal	Nicole Campbell	Greg Smith (Lib)	Lindsay Peters	John Kingsmill	David Havyatt	Michael Bergman (AAFI); Martin Levine (Ind); Christina Metlikovec (Ind); Simon Tam (Unity)
Fairfield	Labor	**Joe Tripodi**	James Conna (Lib)	Lizza Gebilagin	Alex Sharah		John Vanderwel (AAFI); John Yuen (Unity)
Gosford	Liberal	**Marie Andrews**	Chris Holstein (Lib)	Hillary Morris	George Grant		Bryan Ellis (SOS); Robert Moulds (AAFI); Debra Wales (Ind)
Goulburn	Liberal	Robert Parker	Pru Goward (Lib)	Bill Dorman	Geoff Peet		David Hughes (AAFI); Paul Stephenson (Ind)
Granville	Labor	David Borger	Eddy Sarkis (Lib)	Pauline Tyrrell	Karen Pender		Peter Dowman (AAFI); Paul Garrard (Ind); Lily Su (Unity)
Hawkesbury	Liberal	Alicia McCosker	Ray Williams (Lib)	Jocelyn Howden			Gregg Pringle (AAFI); **Steven Pringle** (Ind)
Heathcote	Labor	**Paul McLeay**	Lee Evans (Lib)	Jill Merrin	John Vanderjagt	Tony Evans	Mary Kelly (AAFI)
Heffron	Labor	**Kristina Keneally**	Scott Nash (Lib)	Ben Spies-Butcher			James Cogan (-)
Hornsby	Liberal	Janelle McIntosh	**Judy Hopwood** (Lib)	Catherine Turner	Leighton Thew	Peter Fallon	Mick Gallagher (Ind); Ian Johnston (Ind); Lyndon Shepherd (AAFI); Fei Zhou (Unity)
Keira	Labor	**David Campbell**	David Moulds (Lib)	Kate Brandreth	George Carfield		Marcus Aussie-Stone (Ind); Maria Patakfalvy (AAFI)
Kiama	Labor	**Matt Brown**	Ann Sudmalis (Lib)	Ben van der Wijngaart	John Kadwell		Garth Bridge (FP); Jack Burnett (AAFI)
Kogarah	Labor	**Cherie Burton**	Peter El Khouri (Lib)	Therese Bolt	Chris Svolos		Marcus Ho (Unity)
Ku-ring-gai	Liberal	Adrian Macarthur-King	**Barry O'Farrell** (Lib)	Susie Gemmell	Witold Wiszniewski	Jeanette Tsoulos	Michael Sun (Unity)
Lake Macquarie	Labor	**Jeff Hunter**	Ken Paxinos (Lib)	Suzanne Pritchard	Rex Morgan		Leonard Hodge (AAFI); Greg Piper* (Ind)
Lakemba	Labor	**Morris Iemma**	Morris Mansour (Lib)	Bashir Sawalha	Josephine Sammut	Garry Dalrymple	Justine Kuniansky (-); Omar Moussa (Unity)
Lane Cove	Liberal	Gabrielle O'Donnell	**Anthony Roberts** (Lib)	Shauna Forrest	Arie Baalbergen	Kate Botting	William Ho (Unity)
Lismore	National	Peter Lanyon	**Thomas George** (Nat)	Andy Gough		Julia Melland	
Liverpool	Labor	**Paul Lynch**	Ned Mannoun (Lib)	Bill Cashman	Elizabeth Hall		Ian Gelling (AAFI); Liliana Ljubicic (Ind); Kek Tai (Unity)
Londonderry	Labor	**Allan Shearan**	Bart Bassett (Lib)	Joel MacRae	John Phillips		Ross Dedman (AAFI)
Macquarie Fields	Labor	Andrew McDonald	Nola Fraser (Lib)	Peter Butler	Hany Gayed		Mick Allen (Ind); Frank Corrigan (AAFI)
Maitland	Labor	Frank Terenzini	Bob Geoghegan (Lib)	Jan Davis	Bob Cotton		Peter Blackmore (Ind); Kellie Tranter (Ind)
Manly	Independent	Daniel Pearce	Mike Baird (Lib)	Sarah Weate	Wally Vanderpoll		**David Barr** (Ind); Neil Hamilton (AAFI); Penelope Wynne (Ind)
Maroubra	Labor	**Michael Daley**	Robert Belleli (Lib)	Anne Gardiner		Kirsten Bennell	Anthony Ayres (Unity); Derek Pitman (Ind)
Marrickville	Labor	**Carmel Tebbutt**	Ramzy Mansour (Lib)	Fiona Byrne	Joseph Tuiletufuga	Martine Eve-MacLeod	Grace Chen (Unity); Pip Hinman (SA); Patrick O'Connor (-); Angus Wood (Ind)
Menai	Labor	**Alison Megarrity**	Steve Simpson (Lib)	Neerav Bhatt		Mark Clyburn	John Collins (AAFI); Chris McLachlan (Ind)
Miranda	Labor	**Barry Collier**	Graham Annesley (Lib)	Julie Simpson	Albert Young	Rob Bunt	John Brett (Ind); Samantha Feinbier (AAFI)
Monaro	Labor	**Steve Whan**	David Madew (Nat)	Catherine Moore			Frank Fragiacomo (Ind)
Mount Druitt	Labor	**Richard Amery**	George Bilic (Lib)	Debbie Robertson	Dave Vincent		John Newton (AAFI)
Mulgoa	Labor	**Diane Beamer**	Karen Chijoff (Lib)	Wade Smith			Geoffrey Dakin (AAFI)
Murray-Darling	National	**Peter Black**	John Williams (Nat)	Judy Renner			Tom Kennedy (Ind); Ron Page (Ind)
Murrumbidgee	National	Michael Kidd	**Adrian Piccoli** (Nat)	Peter Carruthers			
Myall Lakes	National	Lisa Clancy	**John Turner** (Nat)	Judy Donnelly			Eddie Loftus (Ind); Waldron Perry (AAFI); John Stephens (Ind)
Newcastle	Labor	Jodi McKay	Martin Babakhan (Lib)	Michael Osborne	John Lee		Hilda Armstrong (Ind); **Bryce Gaudry** (-); Noel Holt (-); Simon Hutabarat (Ind); John Tate (Ind)
North Shore	Liberal	Tabitha Winton	**Jillian Skinner** (Lib)	Lynne Saville	David Brock	Jan De Voogd	Jim Reid (Ind)
Northern Tablelands	Independent	Phil Usher	Phillip Kelly (Nat)	Vanessa Bible	Isabel Strutt		**Richard Torbay** (Ind)
Oatley	Labor	**Kevin Greene**	Roger Gray (Lib)	Paul Gage	Martin Baker		Michele Adair (Ind); Greg Briscoe-Hough (Ind); Nancy Liu (Unity); John McGrath (AAFI)
Orange	National	Kevin Duffy	**Russell Turner** (Nat)	Jeremy Buckingham			John Davis (Ind)
Oxley	National	Stuart Holmes	**Andrew Stoner** (Nat)	Gabrielle Tindall		Sherry Stumm	Brian Gardyne (AAFI)
Parramatta	Labor	**Tanya Gadiel**	John Chedid (Lib)	Tim Hendry	Doug Morrison	Robert McFarlane	John Mansfield (AAFI); Ada Wong (Unity)
Penrith	Labor	**Karyn Paluzzano**	Tricia Hitchen (Lib)	Suzie Wright	Andrew Green	Geraldine Waters	Geoff Brown (Ind); Anthony Mavin (AAFI)
Pittwater	Independent	Pat Boydell	Rob Stokes (Lib)	Craige McWhirter	Patricia Giles	Mario Nicotra	Charles Byrne (AAFI); **Alex McTaggart** (Ind)
Port Macquarie	Independent	Monica Hayes	Leslie Williams (Nat)	Susie Russell			**Rob Oakeshott*** (Ind); Frank Reid (AAFI)
Port Stephens	Labor	Jim Arneman	Craig Baumann (Lib)	Charmian Eckersley	Margaret Higgins		Paul Hennelly (FP); Lawrence Wood (AAFI)
Riverstone	Labor	**John Aquilina**	Kevin Conolly (Lib)	Sheryl Jarecki			Ronald Atkins (AAFI); Tony Pettitt (Ind)
Rockdale	Labor	**Frank Sartor**	Lili Gestakovska (Lib)	Liam McGillicuddy			Abbas Amin (-); Lesleyanne Azel (SOS); Brian Walsh (Ind); Gang Wang (Unity)
Ryde	Labor	**John Watkins**	Vic Tagg (Lib)	Peter Bell	Robyn Peebles	Peter Goldfinch	Kevin Chin (Unity); Furgen Gruener (AAFI); Ivan Petch (Ind)
Shellharbour	Labor	Lylea McMahon	Stuart Wright (Lib)	Sonya McKay			Alex Darling (Ind); Tibor Patakfalvy (AAFI)
Smithfield	Labor	Ninos Khoshaba	Andrew Rohan (Lib)	Vlaudin Vega	Liam Pender		Minh Phu (Unity); Alexander Pini (AAFI)
South Coast	Liberal	Michelle Miran	**Shelley Hancock** (Lib)	Amanda Findley	Paul Green		Rex Dobson (AAFI)
Strathfield	Labor	**Virginia Judge**	Bill Carney (Lib)	Michele Sacco	John Maloney	Patrick Garson	Benjamin Cai (Unity)
Swansea	Labor	Robert Coombs	Garry Edwards (Lib)	Susan Wynn	Jill Wood	Peter Lee	Barbara Abrahams (AAFI); Laurie Coghlan (Ind)
Sydney	Independent	Linda Scott	Edward Mandla (Lib)	Chris Harris			Imanuel Choyce (Unity); Malcolm Duncan (Ind); **Clover Moore*** (Ind)
Tamworth	Independent	Denise McHugh	Kevin Anderson (Nat)	Bruce Taylor	Neville Mammen		**Peter Draper*** (Ind); Stan Heuston (-); Norman Parsons (AAFI)
Terrigal	Liberal	Deborah O'Neill	**Chris Hartcher** (Lib)	Terry Jones	Mark McAllan		David Begg (ORP); Mark Ellis (SOS); Kay Hayes (AAFI)
The Entrance	Labor	**Grant McBride**	Phil Walker (Lib)	Kerryn Parry-Jones			Maria Overend (AAFI)
Toongabbie	Labor	Nathan Rees	Kirsty Lloyd (Lib)	Doug Williamson	Sam Baissari		Norman Carey (AAFI); Chuan Ren (Unity)
Tweed	Labor	**Neville Newell**	Geoff Provest (Nat)	Tom Tabart			Julie Boyd (Ind); Will King (AAFI); Gavin Lawrie (Ind)
Upper Hunter	National	Jennifer Lecky	**George Souris** (Nat)	Bev Smiles			
Vaucluse	Liberal	Alison Rahill	**Peter Debnam** (Lib)	David Shoebridge			
Wagga Wagga	Liberal	Glenn Elliott-Rudder	**Daryl Maguire** (Lib)	Ray Goodlass			
Wakehurst	Liberal	Patricio Chavez	**Brad Hazzard** (Lib)	Conny Harris		Georgina Johanson	Thomas Moody (AAFI)
Wallsend	Labor	Sonia Hornery	James Herington (Lib)	Keith Parsons	Milton Caine		Dallas Davies (FP)
Willoughby	Liberal	Linda Beattie	**Gladys Berejiklian** (Lib)	Mike Steel	Esther Heng	Roy Day	Cherie Kam (Unity); Pat Reilly (Ind)
Wollondilly	Labor	Phil Costa	Sharryn Hilton (Lib)	Geraldine Hunt			Maurice Nelmes (Ind); Danny Stewart (Ind)
Wollongong	Labor	**Noreen Hay**	Colin Fowler (Lib)	Trevor Jones	Clarrie Pratt	Madeleine Roberts	Michael Chehoff (AAFI); Lenny Fares (Ind); Jess Moore (SA)
Wyong	Labor	David Harris	Ben Morton (Lib)	Scott Rickard	Adrian Loel		Greg Best (Ind); Richard Spark (AAFI)

== Legislative Council ==
Sitting members are shown in bold text. Tickets that elected at least one MLC are highlighted in the relevant colour. Successful candidates are identified by an asterisk (*).

Labor candidates	Coalition candidates	Greens candidates	Christian Democrats candidates	Democrats candidates
1. **John Della Bosca***; 2. **Ian Macdonald***; 3. **John Hatzistergos***; 4. Lynda Voltz*; 5. **Eddie Obeid***; 6. Helen Westwood*; 7. **Amanda Fazio***; 8. **Henry Tsang***; 9. Mick Veitch*; 10. Tony Keating; 11. Pauline James; 12. Sandra Woods; 13. Barry Calvert; 14. Robert Doherty; 15. Glenda Gartrell; 16. Tegan Alchin; 17. Brendan Cavanagh; 18. Rob Allen	1. **Charlie Lynn*** (Lib); 2. **Jenny Gardiner*** (Nat); 3. **Don Harwin*** (Lib); 4. **Matthew Mason-Cox*** (Lib); 5. **Melinda Pavey*** (Nat); 6. John Ajaka* (Lib); 7. Marie Ficarra* (Lib); 8. Trevor Khan* (Nat); 9. Scot MacDonald (Lib); 10. John Caputo (Lib); 11. Peter Burnheim (Nat); 12. Sarah Lawrance (Lib); 13. Stephen Choularton (Lib); 14. Lynette Webster (Lib); 15. Warwick Moppett (Nat)	1. **Lee Rhiannon***; 2. John Kaye*; 3. Ben Oquist; 4. Lesa de Leau; 5. Marika Kontellis; 6. Saeed Khan; 7. Michael Sergent; 8. Patricia Tsang; 9. Dominic Kanak; 10. Eleanor Gibbs; 11. Wendy White; 12. Vanessa Grindon-Ekins; 13. Peter Stahel; 14. Sandra Heilpern; 15. Jennifer Hanson; 16. Keith Hughes; 17. Jan Green; 18. Stephen Allen; 19. Andrew Martin; 20. James Diack; 21. Jodie Coleman	1. **Fred Nile***; 2. Gary Raymond; 3. Brian Watters; 4. June Dally-Watkins; 5. Peter Barnes; 6. Kevin Hume; 7. Peter Walker; 8. Peter Rahme; 9. Len Kingston; 10. Arthur Moore; 11. Gamil Helmy-Kostandy; 12. Elwyn Sheppard; 13. Barry Small; 14. Brendan Johnston; 15. Elaine Nile; 16. Kylie Laurence; 17. Margaret Ratcliffe; 18. Gilbert van der Jagt; 19. Malcolm Smith; 20. Ian Smith; 21. Donald Jamieson	1. **Arthur Chesterfield-Evans**; 2. Lyn Shumack; 3. Carolyn Hastie; 4. Brett Paterson; 5. David King; 6. Michelle Bleicher; 7. Chris Owens; 8. Stephen Bingle; 9. Pamela Clifford; 10. Josephine Nicotra; 11. Felicity Boyd; 12. Brian Day; 13. Harry Boyle; 14. John Haydon; 15. Audrey Pratt; 16. Surb Bhatti
Shooters candidates	AAFI candidates	Unity candidates	Socialist Alliance candidates	Save Our Suburbs candidates
1. Roy Smith*; 2. Robert Borsak; 3. Joan Maraldo; 4. Robyn Bourke; 5. David Cook; 6. James Muirhead; 7. Alison Newbery; 8. Robert Shaw; 9. John Howden; 10. Stephen Mainstone; 11. Teresa Alexeeff; 12. Barry Shade; 13. Jeffrey Bond; 14. Andrew Mallen; 15. Rodney Franich; 16. James Thornley; 17. Alois Ambs; 18. Ashley Coombs; 19. Mitchell Newbery	1. Janey Woodger; 2. Al Heinrichs; 3. Kenneth O'Leary; 4. Robert Girvan; 5. Kenneth Spragg; 6. James Bateman; 7. Patricia Bateman; 8. Eddington Sherwood; 9. John Campbell; 10. James Clarke; 11. Roy Butler; 12. Jane Heinrichs; 13. John Woodger; 14. Paul Higgins; 15. Peter James	1. Le Lam; 2. Bob Reid; 3. Therese Le-Dang; 4. Muhammet Eris; 5. Willis Phong; 6. Bernadette Waters; 7. Shan Su; 8. Addy Cheong; 9. Jennifer Jacovou; 10. Emine Aslan; 11. Khanh Mach; 12. Bayram Ceylan; 13. Bulent Kadayifci; 14. Marta Aquino; 15. Zhi Wang; 16. Nai Wong; 17. Si Wu; 18. Jian Zeng	1. Jakalene X 2. Susan Price; 3. Raul Bassi; 4. Rachel Evans; 5. Marie McKern; 6. Marg Perrott; 7. Maureen Frances; 8. Geoff Payne; 9. Simon Cunic; 10. Lisa Macdonald; 11. Aaron Benedek; 12. Nick Fredman; 13. Amber Pike; 14. Adam Leeman; 15. Tamara Pearson; 16. Kamala Emanuel	1. Tony Recsei; 2. Colin Freeman; 3. Janine Kitson; 4. Jean Lennane; 5. Pat Garnet; 6. Bernie Laughlan; 7. John Ward; 8. Anthony Meaney; 9. Ted Webber; 10. Barry Hadaway; 11. Antony Howe; 12. Jean Posen; 13. Rosemary Hadaway; 14. Marga van Gennip; 15. Allan Butt; 16. Ross Collins; 17. Leanne Gavagna
Human Rights candidates	RWRP candidates	Fishing Party candidates	HRP/ORP candidates	Group A candidates
1. **Peter Breen**; 2. Claudette Palmer; 3. Miralem Nikolovski; 4. Bosko Velevski; 5. Dzevdet Alic; 6. Suzana Panovska; 7. Ljupco Poposki; 8. Valery Murphy; 9. Angela Mammone; 10. Janette Warby; 11. Erin Peak; 12. Maree Breen; 13. Catherine Byrne; 14. Michael Davis; 15. Diane Thomas	1. Barry Gissell; 2. Charles Winter; 3. Anthony Adams; 4. James Forbes; 5. Jody Gissell; 6. Clifford Walford; 7. Denis Nash; 8. Frederick Walford; 9. Caroline Johnson; 10. Robyn Walford; 11. Janelle Smith; 12. Donna Adams; 13. Gai Taylor; 14. Julie Parsons; 15. Todd Marr; 16. Gloria Walker; 17. Yvonne King; 18. David McCabe	1. Robert Smith; 2. Elizabeth Stocker; 3. Mark Stocker; 4. Deanne Shepherd; 5. Gary Hyland; 6. Stewart Paterson; 7. Marcus Soane; 8. David Hitchcock; 9. Craig Oaten; 10. Darren McCook; 11. Jason Dwonie; 12. Craig McCartney; 13. David McCartney; 14. Les Proctor; 15. Bill Lee; 16. Elvis Besirevic; 17. Rex Buckley; 18. Ken Martin; 19. Bruce Wall; 20. Roe Martin	1. Graham Crossley (H); 2. Frank Sanzari (O); 3. Wendy Smallwood (H); 4. Robert Kelly (O); 5. Debra Avis (H); 6. Alex Stitt (O); 7. Babette Gomme (H); 8. Garth Coulter (O); 9. Raymond Hamilton (O); 10. Bruce Close (O); 11. Gary Weingartner (O); 12. Jennifer Harris (O); 13. Grant Stone (O); 14. David Harris (O); 15. John Gibbins (O)	1. Nell Brown; 2. Marylou Carter; 3. Luisa Mockler; 4. Mary Mockler; 5. Lina Aggett; 6. Joyce Bellchambers; 7. Wendy Stepkovitch; 8. Robyn Chapman; 9. Lyn Allen; 10. Estelle Shields; 11. Mel Pesa; 12. David Carter; 13. Maree Buckwalter; 14. Nick Stepkovitch; 15. Betty Stepkovitch; 16. Ella Ricketson
Group D candidates	Group F candidates	Group H candidates	Group M candidates	Ungrouped candidates
1. Nick Beams; 2. Terry Cook; 3. Carol Divjak; 4. Barry Robson; 5. Peter Symonds; 6. Mike Head; 7. Gabriela Zabala; 8. Karen Hopperdietzel; 9. Clay Robinson; 10. Beryl Hood; 11. Mile Klindo; 12. John Plater; 13. Regina Lohr; 14. John Christian; 15. Ismet Redzovic	1. Patrice Newell; 2. Genia McCaffery; 3. Matt Noffs; 4. John McInerney; 5. Louise Upton; 6. Caroline Pidcock; 7. Alicia Campbell; 8. Vicki Younger; 9. Michael Kiely; 10. David Jeffery; 11. Joe Herbertson; 12. Luke Williams; 13. Lindsay Johnston; 14. John Polglase; 15. Bruce Ward; 16. Christopher Sanderson; 17. Stan Glaser; 18. Michael Heffernan; 19. Ben Grace; 20. Basia Rendall; 21. Alexandra Morphett	1. Kerry McNally; 2. Stephanie Badger; 3. Greg Hamilton; 4. Ralph Karpin; 5. Jean McCartney; 6. Clinton Portors; 7. Geoff Coulin; 8. Tracey Padwick; 9. Dennis Deegan; 10. Michael Braham; 11. Samone Mason; 12. Tom Thompson; 13. Andrew Katelaris; 14. Tricia Clayton; 15. Darren Erksine	1. Jack Tait; 2. Noeline Franklin; 3. Joe Chidiac; 4. Ian Franklin; 5. Geoff Davis; 6. Harry Segal; 7. Arthur Dyason; 8. Edward Hayman; 9. Chris Ripoll; 10. Mark Wyman; 11. Dave Pratt; 12. Ernest Braden; 13. Ben Innes; 14. Liz Innes; 15. James Anderson	Dawn Fraser; Ryan Lovett; Alasdair Macdonald; Jose Nunez; Richard Carbury; David Rofe; Jordie Bodlay

== See also ==
- Members of the New South Wales Legislative Assembly, 2003–2007
- Members of the New South Wales Legislative Council, 2003–2007
