= Electoral results for the district of Murray-Darling =

Election results for Murray-Darling, New South Wales, Australia

Murray-Darling an electoral district of the Legislative Assembly in the Australian state of New South Wales was created in 1999 and abolished in 2015.

Election	Member	Party
1999	Peter Black	Labor
2003	Peter Black	Labor
2007	John Williams	National
2011	John Williams	National

== Election results ==
=== Elections in the 2010s ===
==== 2011 ====
2011 New South Wales state election: Murray-Darling
Party	Candidate	Votes	%	±%
National	John Williams	28,941	74.1	+17.6
Labor	Neville Gasmier	8,096	20.7	−16.3
Greens	Heidi Hendry	2,031	5.2	+2.8
Total formal votes		39,068	97.3	−0.6
Informal votes		1,073	2.6	+0.6
Turnout		40,141	87.5	
Two-party-preferred result
National	John Williams	29,466	77.2	+17.1
Labor	Neville Gasmier	8,684	22.8	−17.1
National hold		Swing	+17.1	

=== Elections in the 2000s ===
==== 2007 ====
2007 New South Wales state election: Murray-Darling
Party	Candidate	Votes	%	±%
National	John Williams	22,918	56.5	+10.6
Labor	Peter Black	15,015	37.0	−6.7
Independent	Tom Kennedy	1,069	2.6	+2.6
Greens	Judy Renner	983	2.4	−0.5
Independent	Ron Page	571	1.4	+1.4
Total formal votes		40,556	97.9	+0.6
Informal votes		868	2.1	−0.6
Turnout		41,424	89.5	
Two-party-preferred result
National	John Williams	23,595	60.1	+8.8
Labor	Peter Black	15,664	39.9	−8.8
National gain from Labor		Swing	+8.8 '"`UNIQ−−ref−0000001E−QINU`"'	

==== 2003 ====
2003 New South Wales state election: Murray-Darling
Party	Candidate	Votes	%	±%
Labor	Peter Black	17,659	50.3	+6.1
National	Marsha Isbester	13,072	37.3	+1.0
Independent	Don McKinnon	2,092	6.0	+6.0
One Nation	Tom Kennedy	1,463	4.2	−12.2
Greens	Geoff Walch	803	2.3	+2.3
Total formal votes		35,099	97.3	−0.9
Informal votes		988	2.7	+0.9
Turnout		36,077	87.6	
Two-party-preferred result
Labor	Peter Black	18,594	56.7	+2.5
National	Marsha Isbester	14,214	43.3	−2.5
Labor hold		Swing	+2.5	

=== Elections in the 1990s ===
==== 1999 ====
1999 New South Wales state election: Murray-Darling
Party	Candidate	Votes	%	±%
Labor	Peter Black	16,781	44.2	−1.2
National	Mark Kersten	13,790	36.3	−15.6
One Nation	Don McKinnon	6,238	16.4	+16.4
Democrats	Dave Burton	792	2.1	+2.1
Citizens Electoral Council	Alan Boyd	246	0.6	+0.6
Non-Custodial Parents	John White	141	0.4	+0.4
Total formal votes		37,988	98.1	+4.4
Informal votes		727	1.9	−4.4
Turnout		38,715	90.7	
Two-party-preferred result
Labor	Peter Black	17,765	54.2	+7.7
National	Mark Kersten	15,002	45.8	−7.7
Labor notional gain from National		Swing	+7.7	
