= 2007 New South Wales state election =

State election for New South Wales, Australia in March 2007

- 24 March 2007

All 93 seats in the New South Wales Legislative Assembly and 21 (of the 42) seats in the New South Wales Legislative Council 47 Assembly seats were needed for a majority
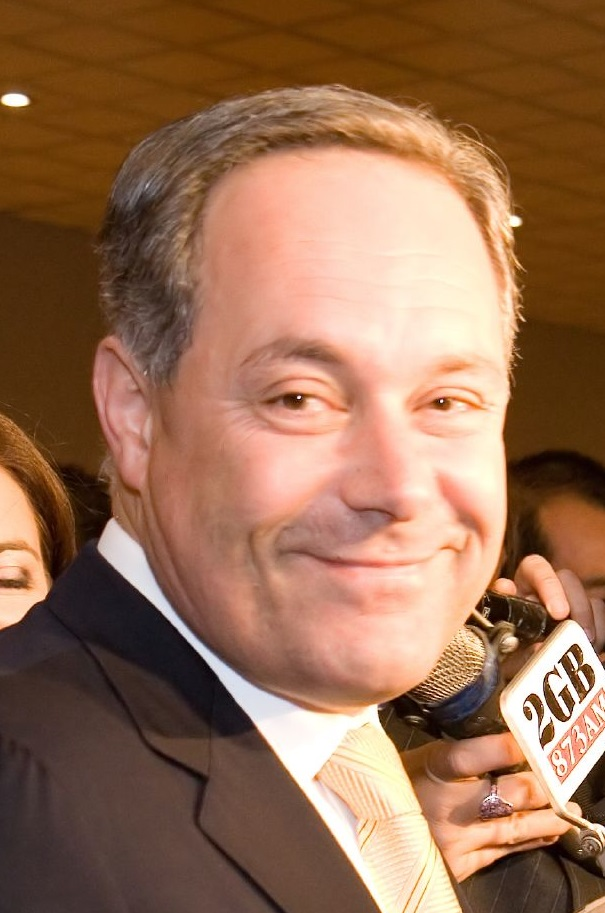

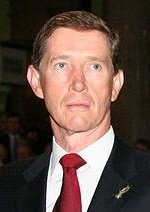
	First party	Second party
Leader	Morris Iemma	Peter Debnam
Party	Labor	Liberal/National coalition
Leader since	3 August 2005	1 September 2005
Leader's seat	Lakemba	Vaucluse
Last election	55 seats	32 seats
Seats before	53 seats	30 seats
Seats won	52 seats	35 seats
Seat change	▼1	▲5
Popular vote	1,535,872	1,457,296
Percentage	38.87%	36.99%
Swing	▼3.81	▲2.64
TPP	52.26%	47.74%
TPP swing	▼3.92	▲3.92
- Two-candidate-preferred margin by electorate
Premier before election
Morris Iemma
Labor
Elected Premier
Morris Iemma
Labor

The 2007 New South Wales state election was held on Saturday, 24 March 2007. The entire Legislative Assembly and half of the Legislative Council was up for election. The Labor Party led by Morris Iemma won a fourth four-year term against the Liberal–National coalition led by Peter Debnam.

Labor's majority survived the election almost intact going from a 13 seat majority prior to the election to a marginally decreased 11 seat majority. The Liberals succeeded in taking two independent-held seats and one Labor-held seat, whilst the Nationals and an independent each took one Labor-held seat. This would be NSW Labor's last state election win until 2023. It also remains the most recent contest in which NSW Labor formed a majority government.

== Campaign ==
Labor, running on the slogan "More to do, but we're heading in the right direction," heavily outspent the Liberals, whose slogan was "Let's fix NSW." Though water and infrastructure emerged as key issues in the campaign, much of the parties' advertising focused on the negatives: Debnam's business record and Labor's record in office.

The media concluded that the choice facing voters was in finding the lesser of two evils: the three major newspapers sold in New South Wales endorsed Debnam, though not without criticising his ineptitude on the campaign trail.

The result was widely perceived as a foregone conclusion, with opposition leader Peter Debnam conceding as much the week before the poll. Opinion polls consistently put Labor ahead in terms of voting intention and preferred premier.

The ALP would eventually lose government at the next election in a landslide defeat in 2011. There has been a view that the party would have suffered a less severe defeat if it had lost government at the 2007 election.

== Electoral system ==
The New South Wales Legislative Assembly has 93 members elected for four-year terms using instant-runoff voting, a form of preferential voting. The voting system is the same as for the Australian House of Representatives except that New South Wales has optional preferential voting. This means that while voters may number every candidate if they wish, their vote is still formal if they choose not to. They may vote for one candidate only, or for as many candidates as they choose, provided that they number them in correct sequence.

The New South Wales Legislative Council has 42 members who serve eight year terms, one-half of the body being elected every four years. The Council uses the Single Transferable Vote method, a form of preferential voting for use with proportional representation. As for the Assembly, the numbering of preferences is optional.

After each election, the Governor of New South Wales, appoints a member of the Legislative Assembly to the position of Premier of New South Wales. By convention, the party leader with the largest bloc of votes in the Assembly, is chosen.

== Legislative Assembly ==
Government is formed in the Legislative Assembly, the lower house of Parliament. The seats for this election resulted from the boundary redistribution conducted in 2004, which did not change the number of seats notionally held by each party.

=== Pendulum ===
A majority being 47 seats, the Labor Party had to lose eight seats (a uniform swing of 8.7%) to lose its majority, and the Liberal–National coalition had to gain 16 seats to gain a majority. Had the Liberal–National coalition gained at least one seat from an independent, a uniform swing of 11.6% would have been sufficient. Otherwise, the necessary uniform swing required would have been 12.3%. Swings of this size are rare in New South Wales politics.

The swings required for the opposing party to take each of the Assembly's 93 seats are often illustrated by means of a Mackerras pendulum.

=== Marginal seats (pre-election) ===
The following seats were described as marginal (i.e. those with a two-candidate preferred margin of 6% or less) by psephologists Malcolm Mackerras and Antony Green after the 2005 redistribution.

Seat	MP	Party	Margin	Seat	MP	Party	Margin
				Orange	Russell Turner	National	5.9%
				Clarence	Steve Cansdell	National	5.3%
				Bega	Andrew Constance	Liberal	4.7%
Pittwater	Alex McTaggart	Independent	5.4%	Goulburn	Peta Seaton	Liberal	4.5%
Wollondilly	New seat	Labor	4.6%	Hornsby	Judy Hopwood	Liberal	4.2%
Monaro	Steve Whan	Labor	4.4%	Baulkham Hills	Wayne Merton	Liberal	4.0%
Tweed	Neville Newell	Labor	4.0%	Lane Cove	Anthony Roberts	Liberal	2.8%
Tamworth	Peter Draper	Independent	1.9%	South Coast	Shelley Hancock	Liberal	1.6%
Manly	David Barr	Independent	1.2%	Murray-Darling	Peter Black	Labor	-1.3%
Dubbo	Dawn Fardell	Independent	0.3%	Terrigal	Chris Hartcher	Liberal	0.6%

=== Results ===
Party	Votes	%	+/–	Seats	+/–
Labor	1,535,872	38.87	▼3.81	52	▼1
Liberal	1,061,273	26.86	▲2.14	22	▲4
National	396,023	10.02	▲0.39	13	▲1
Independents	361,866	9.16	▲0.97	6	▼3
Greens	352,805	8.93	▲0.68	0	Steady
Christian Democrats	97,420	2.47	▲0.74	0	Steady
Unity	43,292	1.10	▼0.20	0	Steady
Democrats	21,099	0.53	▼0.40	0	Steady
Others	81,927	2.07	0.77	0	Steady
Total	3,951,577	100.00	–	93	–
Valid votes	3,951,577	97.24			
Invalid/blank votes	112,152	2.76	▲0.14		
Total votes	4,063,729	100.00	–		
Registered voters/turnout	4,374,029	92.91	▲1.04		
Source: NSW Elections - 2007 Results
Two-party-preferred
Labor	1,788,142	52.26	▼3.92		
Liberal/National	1,633,381	47.74	▲3.92		
Total	3,421,523	100.00	–		

Popular vote
Labor	38.98%
Liberal	26.94%
National	10.05%
Independent	9.18%
Greens	8.95%
Christian Democrats	2.47%
Unity	0.90%
Democrats	0.54%
Others	1.99%
Two-party-preferred vote
Labor	52.26%
Coalition	47.74%
Parliamentary seats
Labor	55.91%
Liberal	23.66%
National	13.98%
Independent	6.45%

== Legislative Council ==
Party	Votes	%	+/–	Seats		
Party	Votes	%	+/–	Not up	Seats won	Seats Total
Labor	1,491,719	39.14	▼4.40	10	9	19
Liberal/National Coalition	1,304,166	34.22	▲0.92	7	8	15
Greens	347,548	9.12	▲0.52	2	2	4
Christian Democrats	168,545	4.42	▲1.39	1	1	2
Shooters	106,513	2.79	▲0.74	1	1	2
Democrats	67,994	1.78	▼0.21	0	0	0
Against Further Immigration	62,386	1.64	▲0.74	0	0	0
Fishing	58,340	1.53	▲1.53	0	0	0
Unity	46,053	1.21	▼0.21	0	0	0
Restore Workers' Rights	35,218	0.92	New	0	0	0
Others	122,763	3.22	*	0	0	0
Total	3,811,245	100.00	–	21	21	42
Valid votes	3,811,245	93.89				
Invalid/blank votes	247,921	6.11	▲0.77			
Total votes	4,059,166	100.00	–			
Registered voters/turnout	4,374,029	92.80	▲0.78			

The Legislative Council, elected by proportional representation, operates as a house of review in the New South Wales parliament. It is rare for parties or coalitions to secure a majority in this house.

The count was completed and results for the Legislative Council declared on 10 April.

The Liberal and National parties ran a joint Legislative Council ticket, winning 5 seats for the Liberals and 3 seats for the Nationals and bringing the parties' totals to 10 and 5 respectively.

Electoral changes made after the 1999 election, which saw seats go to so-called microparties through elaborate preference deals, meant that both the major party groups made gains in the 2007 election. The Labor Party with 39.1% of the vote gained 1 seat, to win 9, whilst the Liberal and National Parties with 34.2% gained 1 seat each to make a combined gain of 2, thereby winning 8 seats. The effect of this outcome is that Labor now holds 19 out of 42 council seats, just 3 short of a majority, whilst the Coalition holds 15 seats.

The Greens achieved a primary vote of 9.1%, an increase from their result in the 2003 election. This has allowed them to win 2 seats (1 additional seat), bringing their total to 4 seats. This result appears to put them in a favourable position, in which they can exercise the parliamentary balance of power, and potentially provide the Labor government with the necessary majority to get legislation through the upper chamber of Parliament.

Fred Nile's Christian Democratic Party (CDP) achieved 4.4% of the vote (↑1.4%), allowing Nile to retain his seat, and keeping the CDP's representation at 2 seats. The Shooters Party won the remaining seat, on 2.8% of the vote, thereby increasing their representation to 2 seats.

The losers from the 2007 election were the Australian Democrats, Unity Party, Outdoor Recreation Party (ORP), Human Rights Party (HRP) (formerly Reform the Legal System Party) and One Nation. These five parties lost their single remaining parliamentary seat, which they had won in 1999. The Australian Democrats and Unity Party polled less than 2%, ORP and HRP polled well below 1%, whilst neither One Nation, nor their former representative-turned-Independent, David Oldfield, contested the 2007 election.

== Seats changing hands ==
Seat	Pre-2007			Swing	Post-2007		
Seat	Party	Member	Margin	Swing	Margin	Member	Party
Port Stephens	Labor	John Bartlett	7.2	-7.3	0.1	Craig Baumann	Liberal
Manly	Independent	David Barr	1.2	-4.6	3.4	Mike Baird	Liberal
Murray-Darling (Note: In 2003, Labor won Murray Darling on a 6.7% margin, however the subsequent redistribution made it notionally National. Labor officially lost the seat at the 2007 election.)	Labor	Peter Black	-1.3	-8.8	10.1	John Williams	National
Tweed	Labor	Neville Newell	4.0	-7.1	3.0	Geoff Provest	National
Pittwater (Note: Pittwater was won by an independent in a 2005 by-election and the shown swing is based on it. At the 2003 election it was won by the Liberals.)	Independent	Alex McTaggart	5.4	-14.8	9.4	Rob Stokes	Liberal
Hawkesbury (Note: In 2003, Hawkesbury was won by Steve Pringle, representing the Liberals on a 14.6% margin against Labor. In 2006, he defected from the Liberals to become an independent.)	Independent	Steven Pringle	N/A	-8.6	6.0	Ray Williams	Liberal
Lake Macquarie	Labor	Jeff Hunter	11.6	-11.7	0.1	Greg Piper	Independent
Newcastle (Note: In 2006, Gaudry was disendorsed by the Labor Party State executive and in January 2007, Gaudry resigned as a member of Labor and ran as an independent.)	Independent	Bryce Gaudry	N/A	-14.2	1.2	Jodi McKay	Labor
Members whose names are in italics retired at the election.

== High-profile seats ==
=== Sydney ===
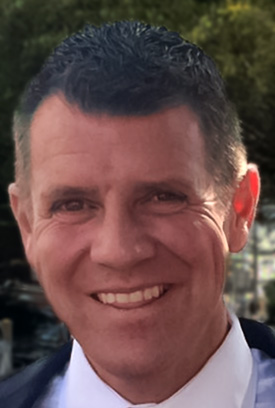
Mike Baird (Liberal) who became NSW Premier in 2014 was first elected in 2007 for the seat of Manly

Balmain, in Sydney's inner-western suburbs, was with Marrickville one of two seats considered potentially winnable for the Greens. Labor incumbent Verity Firth suffered a 2.9% primary and 3.2% two-candidate preferred swing against the Greens, to finish on 39.2% and 53.8% respectively.

The Liberals held on to Hawkesbury despite an independent challenge from Steven Pringle, the disendorsed Liberal incumbent. Pringle won 28.0% of the primary vote, at the expense of Labor and other independent candidates. Liberal candidate Ray Williams saw his primary vote dip by just 1.0%.

In Macquarie Fields, high-profile Liberal candidate Nola Fraser achieved a 12% swing in two-party-preferred terms compared to the 2003 poll. The incumbent, Labor's Steven Chaytor, had bowed out of the contest after being convicted for assaulting his girlfriend. Local issues such as hospital scandals and the 2005 Macquarie Fields riots may have also contributed to the high Liberal vote. Labor candidate Andrew McDonald won Macquarie Fields comfortably.

The Liberals won Manly from the independents for the first time since the 1980s. Sitting MP David Barr lost to future Premier Mike Baird, who increased the Liberals' primary vote by 4.4%.

In the very safe Labor seat of Blacktown Liberal candidate Mark Spencer managed to gain a higher than average swing against incumbent Paul Gibson who then retired at the next election.

Marrickville, in Sydney's inner west, was with Balmain the other seat considered potentially winnable for the Greens. Labor's Carmel Tebbutt suffered a 1.1% primary and 2.6% two-candidate preferred swing against the Greens, to finish on 46.6% and 57.5% respectively. Tebbutt won the seat in a 2005 by-election after quitting the Legislative Council, and is a senior member of the party's left wing and has a strong personal following in the area.

The Liberals lost Pittwater to independent Alex McTaggart at a by-election called after the resignation of John Brogden. The Liberals' Rob Stokes won the seat back on primaries, taking 50.5% of the vote.

=== Rural and regional ===
Independent Dubbo MP Dawn Fardell fought off a challenge from the Nationals to retain her seat. The Nationals lost ground slightly, but the seat remains one of the state's most marginal.

Star Liberal candidate Pru Goward beat off a tough fight in Goulburn with independent candidate Paul Stephenson capturing a quarter of the vote. Goward was helped by the Nationals' decision not to run in the seat but both Labor and the Coalition lost ground. Allegations surfaced during the campaign that Labor was assisting Stephenson's campaign.

Independent Greg Piper won the safe seat of Lake Macquarie from Labor's Jeff Hunter. Labor and the Liberals lost 10.4% and 15.7% of their primary vote respectively.

Sitting Labor MP Bryce Gaudry chose to stand as an independent after being disendorsed by his party in the seat of Newcastle. Gaudry and another independent, John Tate, both outpolled the Greens and the Liberals. Labor's Jodi McKay suffered a 17.1% swing against her but won the seat on preferences.

Port Stephens Incumbent Labor MP John Bartlett retired at this election. The Liberals' Craig Baumann added 8.7% to his party's primary vote in the seat to outpoll Labor, and narrowly defeat ALP candidate Jim Arneman.

The Labor member for Swansea, Milton Orkopoulos, resigned from parliament after being charged with a number of child-sex and drug offenses. An expected backlash against the ALP materialised in the form of an 11.3% swing, with independent candidate Laurie Coghlan the main beneficiary. Nonetheless, Labor candidate Robert Coombs was able to hold the seat with a comfortable majority.

Tweed, Labor's most marginal seat, fell to the Nationals' Geoff Provest. Labor incumbent Neville Newell had previously served two terms (six years) in the federal seat of Richmond before his two terms (eight years) in the State Parliament. A swing of 7.8% meant that the seat changed from being a marginal seat for Labor to a National Party marginal.

The Liberals lost primary votes in the seat of Wyong, bucking the statewide swing to the party. The Liberals had disendorsed candidate Brenton Pavier after details emerged of a sex joke he had sent to friends via SMS. The Liberals' new candidate, Ben Morton, managed a 5.4% swing in two-party-preferred terms, not enough to take victory from Labor candidate David Harris. Incumbent Labor MP Paul Crittenden retired at the election.

=== High profile candidates ===
- Dawn Fraser, a champion swimmer, headed her own independent ticket for the Legislative Council, but was unsuccessful in getting elected.
- Pru Goward, a former federal Sex Discrimination Commissioner, won Goulburn for the Liberals
- Mamdouh Habib, a former Guantanamo Bay detention camp inmate, ran as an independent in Auburn
- Phil Koperberg, the state's Rural Fire Service chief, won Blue Mountains for Labor
- Jodi McKay, a former NBN Television newsreader, won Newcastle for Labor
- June Dally Watkins, head of the eponymous deportment school, was a Legislative Council candidate for the Christian Democrats

=== Retiring ===
A number of MPs did not seek re-election in 2007. Liberal MPs Andrew Tink (Epping) and Peta Seaton, (Southern Highlands) retired. Andrew Humpherson (Davidson) lost preselection and did not contest his seat. Nationals MP Ian Slack-Smith (Barwon) also retired.

The Labor MPs retiring at the 2007 election were John Bartlett (Port Stephens), Paul Crittenden (Wyong), John Mills (Wallsend), Sandra Nori (Port Jackson), John Price (Maitland) and Kim Yeadon (Granville). Steven Chaytor (Macquarie Fields) and Milton Orkopoulos (Swansea), each arrested for violent crimes in late 2006, pulled out of the election. Carl Scully (Smithfield), dumped from the ministry for misleading parliament, chose not to recontest his seat. Attorney-General Bob Debus (Blue Mountains) did not seek re-election, in anticipation of a move to federal politics.

== See also ==
- Candidates of the 2007 New South Wales state election
