= Silma Ihram =

Australian writer and Islamic campaigner

- Born: Anne Frances Beaumont; 1954 (age 71–72); Sydney, New South Wales, Australia
- Education: Meriden School; Presbyterian Ladies' College, Sydney; James Cook University; University of Sydney; University of New South Wales; University of Western Sydney
- Occupations: Principal, education consultant
- Employer: Australian International Academy
- Known for: Pioneer of Muslim education, School founder & Principal, Campaigner for racial tolerance, Political candidate
- Term: 1983–2006
- Political party: Unity Party (2002); Australian Democrats (2007)
- Board member of: Muslim Women's National Network Australia
- Spouses: Siddiq Buckley; Baheej Adada
- Children: 6
- Website: www.silmapol.blogspot.com

Silma Ihram (born Anne Frances Beaumont; c. 1954) is an Australian promoter of Muslim education in Western Sydney, founder and former school Principal of the 'Noor Al Houda Islamic College' in Sydney, and a campaigner for racial tolerance.

She was also the Australian Democrats candidate for the seat of Auburn in the 2007 state election, and the Democrats candidate for the Division of Reid in the 2007 federal election.

Ihram is the author of two books, the producer of an educational video in Arabic, and the subject of the documentary, Silma's School. She has been described as "Erin Brockovich in a hijab".

== Early life ==
Silma Ihram was born Anne Frances Beaumont, to a middle-class agnostic family, and grew up in the suburb of Balgowlah, on Sydney's Northern Beaches. At the age of five, Ihram was sent to boarding school at Meriden, an Anglican school in Strathfield for her primary education, and the Presbyterian Ladies' College in Croydon for high school, completing her matriculation in 1971. She then completed a bachelor's degree in Marine biology at James Cook University.

Despite the Anglican, Presbyterian and Methodist influences from her up-bringing, Ihram became Baptist finding them to be "very inspirational." She then moved to an Islander church in North Queensland, and studied theology by correspondence from the Baptist sector. Ihram became a born-again Christian in 1968, and participated in missionary work with the Children's Special Service Mission (CSSM) in the late 1960s and early 1970s.

In 1976, during an extended trip to Indonesia, Ihram had a "personal revelation that I had to become a Muslim" and converted to Islam, changing her name to Silma Ihram. She was followed soon after by her Irish Catholic husband. She subsequently returned to university, this time at the University of Sydney, completing a Bachelor of Arts in Southeast Asian Studies and Modern History. She established the first Muslim Women's Shop and Centre in 1979.

== Career in education ==
In the early 1980s, Silma Ihram, then the proprietor of the Muslim Women's Shop and Centre, approached her old school, the Presbyterian Ladies' College, Sydney, looking to enrol her daughters. It was reported that her request for the school to allow her daughters to be accepted as Muslims, including the wearing of a Hijab with the uniform, was rejected. Subsequently, and also due in part to the lack of Muslim schools in New South Wales, Ihram looked to establishing her own independent school in South-western Sydney.

In 1983, Ihram and her then husband, Siddiq Buckley, set up the Al-Noori Muslim Primary School at Greenacre, named after a Kuwaiti benefactor who had donated A$5,000. The school was forced to move nine times in four years, to such places as a house in Lakemba, a Hall in Canterbury, and a marquee in the Buckley's backyard. According to Ihram, this was due to an inability to "get registration from government without development approval from the council" as "no council would accept us." These problems with council have been a feature of Ihram's schools to this day.

Ihram took her case to the Land and Environment Court, and after two actions to force Bankstown Council to give official approval, a primary school for 105 children was established in 1987. Ihram and her husband faced angry protests due to the schools slogan, Good Muslims make Good Australians.

The school also received little support from Muslim community organisations, making the struggle even more difficult, and creating a credibility problem within the media. Buckley identified the Muslim community itself as a stumbling block, describing it as "internally factionalised, ethnically diverse, politically impotent, intellectually moribund." The school had little access to overseas Islamic charities to provide funding, and subsequently Ihram and her husband struggled to sufficiently equip their school. Assistance came in the form of individual families, with one mother offering to sell her home, rather than see the school close. Despite the setbacks and racism faced by Ihram, enrolments at the school were strong, and Muslim education was given a foothold in Sydney. In 1992, Ihram again returned to university, completing a Master's in Education Administration at the University of New South Wales, to aid her running of the school.

Al-Noori received positive attention when it was revealed that Ihram had encouraged her students to lobby for the release of an Australian pilot held hostage in Kuwait, who was the grandson of one of the school's elderly neighbours. According to Mr. Bukley, it was "probably the first time in Australia that Muslims were portrayed as both patriotically Australian and genuinely Muslim", and had a positive impact on the school. This was however not the end of Ihram's problems. She had divorced her husband and opened a second school, the Noor Al Houda Islamic College (meaning "The Guiding Light"), this time for high school students, and a board battle ensued that ended in the Supreme Court of New South Wales.

The second school had been established on a leased site near Bankstown Airport and had attracted approximately 720 students. This site was shortly after found to be contaminated and the school was forced to contribute to the cost of a clean-up. It was soon after discovered that the Federal Airports Corporation, who had leased the land to Noor Al Houda, knew previously of the contamination. Ihram decided to fight against Bankstown Airport to save Noor Al Houda, resulting in a five-year-long Supreme court battle involving 125 court appearances. She re-mortgaged and later sold her home, and accessed her superannuation to cover part of the $2million in legal expenses. The school was eventually awarded $1,094,430 in damages by Justice Clifton Hoeben, finding the Federal Airports Corporation, and subsequently the Bankstown Airport Ltd, owed the school a duty of care to disclose a report that the land was contaminated with sewage waste. However, the judge said the $5.1 million Noor Al Houda was originally seeking in damages was "unrealistic" as the cost of moving was only an estimate. As a witness, the judge determined that Ihram:

had a clear motivation to give her evidence particularly as to conversations in such a way as to assist the College. An area of clear unreliability was at paras 49–51 of her affidavit .. I found her oral evidence generally reliable. Where, however, it conflicted with that of Ms Williams [on behalf of Bankstown Airport] I prefer the evidence of Ms Williams.

Ihram's campaign to pressure the Government to find a new home for the school became a subject of debate following up to the 2003 state election. In 2002, the NSW Government offered a suitable property at Guildford which was accepted, however a number of local residents complained of having a school there and the decision was revoked. Aided by her second husband Baheej Adada, Ihram managed to find a new, but much smaller site for her school in Strathfield South, and at the same time publicly expressed her dissatisfaction with the then Premier of New South Wales, Mr. Bob Carr. The new, and current school campus is a former Christian theological college whose chapel has become a Hindu temple. The temple is dedicated to Sai Baba of Shirdi, an Indian saint who a century ago made his home in a mosque in India and taught harmony between Muslims and Hindus.

In 2006, Ihram's battle to save her school, whilst also ensuring her family's economic survival, became the subject of Silma's School, a documentary by Jane Jeffes, screened at the Sydney Film Festival, and in selected cinemas and on SBS and ABC TV. The film received positive reviews and was greeted with a standing ovation at a screening in Sydney, and a sold-out premiere in London.

Also that year, management of the Noor Al Houda Islamic College was taken over by a large Muslim college, the Australian International Academy from Melbourne, allowing Ihram to step down from her role as Principal to spend time with her family and work on other projects. Subsequently, the school is now known as the Australian International Academy, Sydney, and Ihram now works as an Education Consultant and is Director of Diversity Skills Training and RTO in Auburn.

== Political career ==
Silma Ihram was elected to the Federal Executive of the Unity Party in 2002, and appeared on the New South Wales State Ballot for the Upper House.

In 2007, Silma Ihram became one of the first two Muslim women to be aligned with a mainstream political party when she ran as an Australian Democrats candidate for the safe Labor seat of Auburn in the 2007 State election. Ihram reportedly decided against running for the seat of Lakemba, an area with a large Muslim population, as she felt she would be labelled a "token Muslim" candidate and wished to not be linked to controversial and much condemned Muslim leader, Sheik Taj El-Din Hilaly, the former Grand Mufti of Australia and New Zealand. As she explained to The Sun-Herald, "Auburn is far more multicultural and less religious and there are more opportunities to help the local community."

Ihram represented the Democrats again in November 2007, this time as a candidate for the Division of Reid in the Australian federal election.

== Today ==
Silma Ihram is married with 6 children and is currently researching her master's degree at Charles Sturt University, in Islamic Studies. She was the vice-president of the Australian Muslim Women's Association, until assisting in the founding of the Australian Muslim Women's Association in 2011 where she is the Project Manager and remains an education consultant in the area of education and Muslim community relations. She frequently partakes in forums and debates regarding issues pertaining to education, racism and Australian Muslims, and also often contributes opinion pieces and interviews with media sources.

Ihram has expressed her ambition to set up an international harmony college, a multi-religion school where the faiths of all students would be respected.

== Awards and committees ==
In 2001, Silma Ihram was a recipient of the Centenary Medal, and in 2005 was named Muslim Woman of the Decade. She was also awarded for her "contributions and efforts in the community", at the 2006 Women of Faith Dinner & Awards, hosted by the Affinity Intercultural Foundation.

Ihram has held a number of executive posts with Muslim organisations in Australia, including vice-president of the Australian Council for Islamic Education in Schools in 2004, the vice-president of the Muslim Women's National Network Australia, Secretary General of the Australian Council for Islamic Education in Schools., and most recently President of the Australian Muslim Women's Association. She was previously inducted into the Rotary Club of Strathfield.

== Publications ==
Silma Ihram is the author of two books, Bridges of Light, and Islamic Parenting. She is also the producer of an educational video in Arabic, called Their First Years.

== See also ==
- Islam in Australia
- Islamic Schools in New South Wales
- List of notable converts to Islam
- List of Old Girls of PLC Sydney
- Candidates of the 2007 New South Wales state election
- Candidates of the 2007 Australian federal election
