= Restore the Workers' Rights Party =

- Leader: Clifford Walford
- Founded: August 2004
- Dissolved: 2012
- Headquarters: Young, New South Wales
- Ideology: Workers rights Trade Unionism
- Political position: Centre-left

Website
- http://www.rwr.org.au

Restore the Workers' Rights Party was a minor Australian political party.

The aim of the party is to represent injured workers. It lists its objective as "Restoration of injured persons to fair and just compensation for their injuries and disabilities, and failing agreement on quantum of / and or right compensation, the full restoration and maintenance of independent and unfettered judicial determination of those entitlements." The party says once this objective is met it would vote in accordance with the direction of the Leader of the Australian Labor Party leading to claims the party is a 'Labor front'.

The party contested the 2007 New South Wales state election and received 18,455 votes; 0.66% of the statewide vote, well short of the quota required to gain a seat.

The party again contested its second election in 2011. The party received 17,661 votes; a statewide vote of 0.43%, about a tenth of what would have been required to gain a seat. The party suffered a swing against it of 0.49%.

The party was deregistered by the Australian Electoral Commission in 2012.
