= Alex Darling =

Australian politician

Alexander Walker Drysdale Darling was the Lord Mayor of Wollongong, New South Wales, Australia. He was elected at a by-election on Saturday 14 September 2002. He was re-elected to the position at the local government election on Saturday 27 March 2004. Prior to his time as lord mayor, he served as Deputy Lord Mayor of Wollongong from September 2001.

Councillor Darling spent four terms on council, serving from 1987 to 1991, from 1995 to 1999, from 1999 to 2004 and from the March 2004 election until the council's replacement by administrators in March 2008.
