= Geoff Provest =

Australian politician

Geoff Provest JP MP

Member of the New South Wales Parliament for Tweed
- Incumbent
- Assumed office 24 March 2007
- Preceded by: Neville Newell
- Majority: 5.0 points (2019)

Personal details
- Born: 29 March 1958 (age 68) Tweed Heads, New South Wales, Australia
- Party: The Nationals

Geoffrey Keith Provest (born 29 March 1958) is an Australian politician and a Nationals member of the New South Wales Legislative Assembly representing the Tweed since 24 March 2007.

Provest was born on the North Coast of New South Wales to parents Sydney Keith Provest and Kath Provest.

Provest managed the Tweed Heads Bowls Club for 15 years. He is a director of Bowls Australia and the chair of the Regional Salvation Army Annual Red Shield Charity Appeal. He was a chairman of the Far Northern New South Wales Sustainable Region Committee, as well as chair of the Regional Clean Up Australia Day Committee, the Tweed & Coolangatta Tourism Inc, and the Acid Sulphate Soils Regional Committee.

Provest took Labor's most marginal seat from Neville Newell in the 2007 election, where he was elected to the New South Wales Legislative Assembly. He was re-elected in 2011, 2015, 2019 and 2023. He was the chair, State and Regional Development Committee in 2011, chair, Committee on Law and Safety since 2015 and chair, Joint Committee on the Office of the Valuer General since 2017.

New South Wales Legislative Assembly
Preceded by Neville Newell	Member for Tweed; 2007–present	Incumbent
