= Fishing Party (Australia) =

The Fishing Party
- Leader: Robert Smith
- Founded: July 2000
- Dissolved: 2008
- Headquarters: 11 Watts Close; Singleton, New South Wales
- Ideology: Populism; Protectionism

The Fishing Party (TFP) was a minor Australian political party whose primary support base is found among recreational fishers. The party was founded by Robert Smith in July 2000 and it had branches in several Australian states. It was headquartered in Singleton, New South Wales (NSW).

The party’s major platform was the challenging of laws which it considers to be inappropriate to recreational fishing practices. The party’s motto is 'I fish I vote'. TFP has protectionist leanings, in that it wishes to control risk to flora and fauna from infections carried by imports. It sees itself as an 'environmentalist' group with a priority on management and access rather than preservation. It therefore seeks to promote sustainable recreational fishing, with an emphasis on humans as being part of the eco-system, not apart from it.

After enlisting 500 members, the party achieved federal official party status on 25 September 2001. On enlisting 750 members, it achieved NSW official party status on 29 January 2002. On 10 March 2004 the Queensland branch was launched, and on 13 May 2004 the Victorian branch came into being. The Fishing Party (Queensland branch) (TFPQ) achieved party registration in 2006, but not until after the 2006 Queensland State election. Nevertheless, the TFP(Qld) endorsed four candidates as independents, and they averaged 8% of the vote, within their respective electorates. The Qld party broke away from the NSW based Federal organisation, using the deregistration of all small parties to register a new name and attempt to widen its appeal and voter base and is now registered with the AEC as Australian Fishing & Lifestyle Party and no longer has any connection with the Fishing Party. This registration is a current matter before the Administrative Appeals Tribunal and the federal court.

The federal party membership comes from NSW, Queensland, Victoria, South Australian Capital Territory, Western Australia and Tasmania.

The Fishing Party contested their first NSW election in 2003 and in March 2007 campaigned heavily with their preferences responsible to oust the Australian Liberal Party in the seat of Port Stephens on Marine Park regulations. The party contested both those Upper House elections and gained 1.5% of votes for the Legislative Council (Upper House). The party has not achieved parliamentary representation. The party has also contested the federal elections of 2001, 2004 and 2007 in the House of Representatives and the Senate, and local government council ballots

Founder Robert Smith is a past Australian Anglers Association President General, and is the President of the NSW Fishing Clubs' Association.

Robert Smith contested the 2008 Lyne by-election, receiving about 3.5 per cent of the vote.

== See also ==
- List of Australian political parties
