= Electoral district of Murray-Darling =

Former state electoral district of New South Wales

Murray-Darling New South Wales—Legislative Assembly
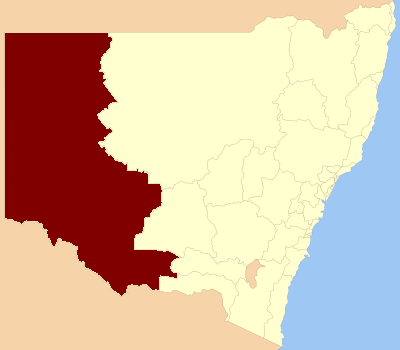
- Location in New South Wales.
- State: New South Wales
- Created: 1999
- Abolished: 2015
- Namesake: Murray and Darling rivers
- Electors: 46,083 (2014)
- Area: 250,388 km^{2} (96,675.3 sq mi)
- Demographic: Rural

Murray-Darling is a former electoral district of the Legislative Assembly in the Australian state of New South Wales.

It included Urana Shire, Jerilderie Shire, Berrigan Shire, Murray Shire, Conargo Shire, Deniliquin Council, Wakool Shire, Hay Shire, Balranald Shire, Wentworth Shire, part of Carrathool Shire (including Goolgowi and Merriwagga), Central Darling Shire, the City of Broken Hill and the Unincorporated Far West.

== History ==
Murray-Darling was created in 1999 from a merger of the Electoral district of Broken Hill and part of the Electoral district of Murray. In 2015, the southern parts of the electorate were absorbed into the revived Murray, while the northern parts (the City of Broken Hill, the Central Darling Shire and the Unincorporated Far West were absorbed into Barwon.

== Members for Murray-Darling ==
| Member | Party | Term |
|---|---|---|
| Peter Black | Labor | 1999–2007 |
| John Williams | National | 2007–2015 |

== Election results ==
2011 New South Wales state election: Murray-Darling
| Party | Candidate | Votes | % | ±% |
|---|---|---|---|---|
| National | John Williams | 28,941 | 74.1 | +17.6 |
| Labor | Neville Gasmier | 8,096 | 20.7 | −16.3 |
| Greens | Heidi Hendry | 2,031 | 5.2 | +2.8 |
| Total formal votes | | 39,068 | 97.3 | −0.6 |
| Informal votes | | 1,073 | 2.6 | +0.6 |
| Turnout | | 40,141 | 87.5 | |
Two-party-preferred result
| National | John Williams | 29,466 | 77.2 | +17.1 |
| Labor | Neville Gasmier | 8,684 | 22.8 | −17.1 |
| National hold | | Swing | +17.1 | |
