= Peter Black (Australian politician) =

Australian politician

Peter Black OAM

Member of the New South Wales Legislative Assembly for Murray-Darling
- In office 27 March 1999 – 24 March 2007
- Preceded by: Seat created
- Succeeded by: John Williams

Mayor of Broken Hill
- In office September 1980 – September 1999
- Preceded by: Kevin Clarke
- Succeeded by: Ron Page

Personal details
- Born: Peter Laurence Black; 14 June 1943 (age 83) Hurstville, New South Wales, Australia
- Party: Labor
- Education: Sydney Technical High School
- Alma mater: University of New South Wales
- Profession: Teacher; politician

Peter Laurence Black OAM (born 14 June 1943) is an Australian former who served as the member for Murray-Darling in the New South Wales Legislative Assembly between 1999 and 2007. Prior to this, he was mayor of Broken Hill from 1980 until 1999.

== Career ==
Black was born in the Sydney suburb of Hurstville and educated at Sydney Boy's Technical High School and received a Bachelor of Science from the University of New South Wales. He was a Science teacher at Willyama High School in Broken Hill before running for New South Wales Parliament. Black became a Broken Hill Council Alderman in 1977 and served a record 19 years as mayor of Broken Hill from September 1980 until September 1999.

Black represented Murray-Darling from 1999 to 2007 for the Labor Party. He was accused of having a drinking problem by other parliamentarians, including his political opponents. Black lost his seat at the 2007 New South Wales state election, after a redistribution gave the expanded Murray-Darling seat an overall National Party majority.

Civic offices
Preceded by Kevin Clarke	Mayor of Broken Hill; 1980–1999	Succeeded by Ron Page
New South Wales Legislative Assembly
New district	Member for Murray-Darling; 1999–2007	Succeeded by John Williams
