= Neville Newell =

Australian politician

Member of the New South Wales Parliament for Tweed
- In office 27 March 1999 – 24 March 2007
- Preceded by: New seat
- Succeeded by: Geoff Provest

Member of the Australian Parliament for Richmond
- In office 24 March 1990 – 2 March 1996
- Preceded by: Charles Blunt
- Succeeded by: Larry Anthony

Personal details
- Born: 14 October 1952 (age 73) Sydney
- Party: Australian Labor Party
- Education: Hawkesbury Agricultural College; Armidale College of Advanced Education
- Occupation: Teacher

Neville Joseph Newell (born 14 October 1952) is an Australian politician. He served as a member of the Australian House of Representatives from 1990 until 1996 and as a member of the New South Wales Legislative Assembly from 1999 to 2007.

Newell was born in Sydney, received a Diploma of Applied Science from the Hawkesbury Agricultural College and a Diploma of Education from the Armidale College of Advanced Education, now part of the University of New England. He was a teacher in the Riverina and Lismore before running for Parliament.

In 1990, Newell was preselected as the Australian Labor Party candidate for Richmond, a historically rural seat in northern New South Wales. The seat was held by the leader of the National Party, Charles Blunt. Newell was initially given little chance of winning, since he was running in what had historically been a strongly conservative seat. It had been in the hands of the non-Labor parties since Federation, and the Nationals had held it without interruption since 1922 though their margin had been declining in recent years. In the election, Newell only won 27 percent of the first preference vote. However, on the seventh count, anti-nuclear activist Helen Caldicott's preferences flowed overwhelmingly to Newell, allowing him to defeat Blunt and become the first Labor member ever to win Richmond. Newell was only the second person to defeat a major federal party leader in an election. He was reelected in 1993 over the Nationals' Larry Anthony, but was defeated by Anthony in 1996.

Newell tried to regain his old seat in 1998, but narrowly lost in his second rematch against Anthony. He subsequently won the state seat of Tweed from the National Party in 1999, but was defeated by National candidate Geoff Provest in 2007.

== Notes ==
Parliament of Australia
Preceded by Charles Blunt	Member for Richmond; 1990–1996	Succeeded by Larry Anthony
New South Wales Legislative Assembly
New district	Member for Tweed; 1999–2007	Succeeded by Geoff Provest
