= John Williams (New South Wales state politician) =

Australian politician

John Williams OAM

Member of the New South Wales Parliament for Murray-Darling
- In office 24 March 2007 – 6 March 2015
- Preceded by: Peter Black
- Succeeded by: Seat abolished

Personal details
- Born: 18 August 1948 (age 78) Perth, Western Australia
- Party: The Nationals

John Douglas Williams OAM (born 18 August 1948) is a former Australian politician, who was the Nationals member for Murray-Darling from 2007 to 2015.

Williams was born on 18 August 1948 in Perth, where he spent the first four years of his life. He spent his next three years in Melbourne before moving to Broken Hill in 1955. He has lived there ever since. He studied economics, accounting and financial management externally through the University of New England.

At the 2007 New South Wales state election, Williams won the seat of Murray-Darling. His candidacy was boosted by the redistribution prior to the election, which turned the seat from marginal Labor to marginal National. At the election, he defeated incumbent Labor MP Peter Black on a swing of nearly nine percent, turning Murray-Darling into a safe National seat at one stroke. He was handily reelected in 2011, increasing his majority to 17 percent.

In July 2014 it was revealed that Williams had verbally attacked then Coalition cabinet minister Robyn Parker with a sexist slur in April 2014, at a meeting in Parliament House during his bid for pre-selection for the New South Wales Legislative Council. He was endorsed as a National Party candidate for the Legislative Council, although in the unwinnable fourth position on the ticket, and was defeated accordingly at the election.

Williams is married to Helen. He has two children and two grandchildren.

Williams now resides in Mildura where he was recently elected president of the Mildura Golf Club.

New South Wales Legislative Assembly
Preceded by Peter Black	Member for Murray-Darling; 2007–2015	Abolished
