= David Barr (politician) =

Australian politician

Member of the New South Wales Legislative Assembly
- In office 1999–2007
- Preceded by: Peter Macdonald
- Succeeded by: Mike Baird
- Constituency: Manly

Personal details
- Party: Independent

David Barr (born 12 July 1946) is an Australian politician. He was the Independent Member for Manly of the New South Wales Legislative Assembly from 1999 to 2007. He succeeded Independent Peter Macdonald and served two terms before his defeat by Liberal candidate Mike Baird.

== Notes ==
New South Wales Legislative Assembly
Preceded by Peter Macdonald	Member for Manly; 1999 – 2007	Succeeded by Mike Baird
