= Members of the New South Wales Legislative Assembly, 1999–2003 =

Members of the New South Wales Legislative Assembly who served in the 52nd parliament held their seats from 1999 to 2003. They were elected at the 2003 state election, and at by-elections. The Speaker was John Murray.

Name	Party	Electorate	Term in office
Pam Allan	Labor	Wentworthville	1988–2007
Richard Amery	Labor	Mount Druitt	1983–2015
Jim Anderson (Note: Londonderry Labor MLA Jim Anderson completed his second term in parliament, but died of a heart attack on the day of the 2003 election, at which he was intending to run for a third term.)	Labor	Londonderry	1995–2003
Marie Andrews	Labor	Peats	1995–2011
John Aquilina	Labor	Riverstone	1981–2011
Ian Armstrong	National	Lachlan	1981–2007
Alan Ashton	Labor	East Hills	1999–2011
David Barr	Independent	Manly	1999–2007
John Bartlett	Labor	Port Stephens	1999–2007
Diane Beamer	Labor	Mulgoa	1995–2011
Peter Black	Labor	Murray-Darling	1999–2007
John Brogden	Liberal	Pittwater	1996–2005
Matt Brown	Labor	Kiama	1999–2011
Cherie Burton	Labor	Kogarah	1999–2015
David Campbell	Labor	Keira	1999–2011
Bob Carr	Labor	Maroubra	1983–2005
Kerry Chikarovski	Liberal	Lane Cove	1991–2003
Barry Collier	Labor	Miranda	1999–2011
Peter Collins	Liberal	Willoughby	1981–2003
Paul Crittenden	Labor	Wyong	1991–2007
John Cull (Note: Tamworth independent MLA Tony Windsor resigned on 16 October 2001 to contest the federal seat of New England in the House of Representatives. National Party candidate John Cull won the resulting by-election on 8 December.)	National	Tamworth	2001–2003
Peter Debnam	Liberal	Vaucluse	1994–2011
Bob Debus	Labor	Blue Mountains	1981–1988, 1995–2007
Richard Face	Labor	Charlestown	1972–2003
Andrew Fraser	National	Coffs Harbour	1990–2019
Bryce Gaudry	Labor	Newcastle	1991–2007
Thomas George	National	Lismore	1999–2019
Paul Gibson	Labor	Blacktown	1988–2011
Ian Glachan	Liberal	Albury	1988–2003
Kevin Greene	Labor	Georges River	1999–2011
Deirdre Grusovin	Labor	Heffron	1990–2003
Gabrielle Harrison	Labor	Parramatta	1994–2003
Chris Hartcher	Liberal	Gosford	1988–2015
Brad Hazzard	Liberal	Wakehurst	1991–2023
Kerry Hickey	Labor	Cessnock	1999–2011
Katrina Hodgkinson	National	Burrinjuck	1999–2017
Judy Hopwood (Note: Hornsby Liberal MLA Stephen O'Doherty resigned on 17 December 2001. Liberal candidate Judy Hopwood won the resulting by-election on 23 February 2002.)	Liberal	Hornsby	2002–2011
Andrew Humpherson	Liberal	Davidson	1992–2007
Jeff Hunter	Labor	Lake Macquarie	1991–2007
Morris Iemma	Labor	Lakemba	1991–2008
Liz Kernohan	Liberal	Camden	1991–2003
Malcolm Kerr	Liberal	Cronulla	1984–2011
Michael Knight (Note: Campbelltown Labor MLA Michael Knight resigned on 12 January 2001. Labor candidate Graham West won the resulting by-election on 3 February.)	Labor	Campbelltown	1981–2003
Craig Knowles	Labor	Macquarie Fields	1990–2005
Faye Lo Po'	Labor	Penrith	1991–2003
Paul Lynch	Labor	Liverpool	1995–2023
Daryl Maguire	Liberal	Wagga Wagga	1999–2018
Col Markham	Labor	Wollongong	1988–2003
Gerard Martin	Labor	Bathurst	1999–2011
Grant McBride	Labor	The Entrance	1992–2011
Tony McGrane	Independent	Dubbo	1999–2004
Ian McManus	Labor	Heathcote	1987–2003
Reba Meagher	Labor	Cabramatta	1994–2008
Alison Megarrity	Labor	Menai	1999–2011
Wayne Merton	Liberal	Baulkham Hills	1988–2011
John Mills	Labor	Wallsend	1988–2007
Clover Moore	Independent	Bligh	1988–2012
Kevin Moss	Labor	Canterbury	1986–2003
John Murray	Labor	Drummoyne	1982–2003
Peter Nagle (Note: Auburn Labor MLA Peter Nagle resigned on 13 July 2001. Labor candidate Barbara Perry won the resulting by-election on 8 September.)	Labor	Auburn	1988–2001
Neville Newell	Labor	Tweed	1999–2007
Sandra Nori	Labor	Port Jackson	1988–2007
Stephen O'Doherty	Liberal	Hornsby	1992–2003
Barry O'Farrell	Liberal	Ku-ring-gai	1995–2015
Rob Oakeshott (Note: Port Macquarie MLA Rob Oakeshott was elected as a member of the National Party, but resigned from the party on 9 March 2002 and served out the remainder of his term as an independent.)	National/Independent	Port Macquarie	1996–2008
Milton Orkopoulos	Labor	Swansea	1999–2007
Don Page	National	Ballina	1988–2015
Ernie Page	Labor	Coogee	1981–2003
Barbara Perry	Labor	Auburn	2001–2015
Adrian Piccoli	National	Murrumbidgee	1999–2017
John Price	Labor	Maitland	1984–2007
Andrew Refshauge	Labor	Marrickville	1983–2005
Michael Richardson	Liberal	The Hills	1993–2011
Kevin Rozzoli	Liberal	Hawkesbury	1973–2003
Marianne Saliba	Labor	Illawarra	1999–2007
Carl Scully	Labor	Smithfield	1990–2007
Peta Seaton	Liberal	Southern Highlands	1996–2007
Jillian Skinner	Liberal	North Shore	1994–2017
Ian Slack-Smith	National	Barwon	1995–2007
Russell Smith	Liberal	Bega	1988–2003
Wayne Smith	Labor	South Coast	1999–2003
George Souris	National	Upper Hunter	1988–2015
Tony Stewart	Labor	Bankstown	1995–2011
Andrew Stoner	National	Oxley	1999–2015
George Thompson	Labor	Rockdale	1991–2003
Andrew Tink	Liberal	Epping	1988–2007
Richard Torbay	Independent	Northern Tablelands	1999–2013
Joe Tripodi	Labor	Fairfield	1995–2011
John Turner	National	Myall Lakes	1988–2011
Russell Turner	National	Orange	1996–2011
John Watkins	Labor	Ryde	1995–2008
Peter Webb	National	Monaro	1999–2003
Graham West	Labor	Campbelltown	2001–2011
Paul Whelan	Labor	Strathfield	1976–2003
Tony Windsor	Independent	Tamworth	1991–2001
Harry Woods	Labor	Clarence	1996–2003
Kim Yeadon	Labor	Granville	1990–2007

== See also ==
- Third Carr Ministry
- Results of the 1999 New South Wales state election (Legislative Assembly)
- Candidates of the 1999 New South Wales state election
