= Results of the 1999 New South Wales Legislative Assembly election =

State election for New South Wales, Australia in March 1999

| Party | Votes | % | +/– | Seats | +/– |
|---|---|---|---|---|---|
| Labor | 1,576,886 | 42.21 | ▲0.94 | 55 | ▲5 |
| Liberal | 927,368 | 24.82 | ▼8.02 | 20 | ▼9 |
| National | 331,343 | 8.87 | ▼2.23 | 13 | ▼4 |
| One Nation | 281,147 | 7.53 | New | 0 | New |
| Independents | 190,793 | 5.11 | ▲0.41 | 5 | ▲2 |
| Greens | 145,019 | 3.88 | ▲1.31 | 0 | Steady |
| Democrats | 124,520 | 3.33 | ▲0.49 | 0 | Steady |
| Christian Democrats | 55,819 | 1.49 | New | 0 | New |
| Unity | 39,562 | 1.06 | New | 0 | New |
| Others | 63,622 | 1.70 | ▼1.54 | 0 | Steady |
| Total | 3,736,079 | 100.00 | – | 93 | – |
| Valid votes | 3,736,079 | 97.49 | | | |
| Invalid/blank votes | 96,000 | 2.51 | ▼3.36 | | |
| Total votes | 3,832,079 | 100.00 | – | | |
| Registered voters/turnout | 4,115,059 | 93.12 | ▼0.68 | | |
Two-party-preferred
| Labor | 1,805,365 | 55.96 | ▲7.14 | | |
| Liberal/National Coalition | 1,420,965 | 44.04 | ▼7.14 | | |
| Total | 3,226,330 | 100.00 | – | | |

This is a list of electoral district results for the 1999 New South Wales state election.

== Results by electoral district ==
=== Albury ===
1999 New South Wales state election: Albury
| Party | Candidate | Votes | % | ±% |
|---|---|---|---|---|
| Liberal | Ian Glachan | 16,374 | 43.0 | −6.9 |
| Independent | Claire Douglas | 13,272 | 34.9 | +34.9 |
| Labor | Mike O'Donnell | 6,703 | 17.6 | −9.9 |
| One Nation | Michael Smith | 1,731 | 4.5 | +4.5 |
| Total formal votes | | 38,080 | 98.5 | +3.2 |
| Informal votes | | 583 | 1.5 | −3.2 |
| Turnout | | 38,663 | 93.0 | |
Notional two-party-preferred count
| Liberal | Ian Glachan | 20,134 | 64.8 | −2.5 |
| Labor | Mike O'Donnell | 10,934 | 35.2 | +2.5 |
Two-candidate-preferred result
| Liberal | Ian Glachan | 17,913 | 51.0 | −16.3 |
| Independent | Claire Douglas | 17,226 | 49.0 | +49.0 |
| Liberal hold | | Swing | −16.3 | |

=== Auburn ===
1999 New South Wales state election: Auburn
| Party | Candidate | Votes | % | ±% |
|---|---|---|---|---|
| Labor | Peter Nagle | 24,207 | 59.5 | −4.4 |
| Liberal | Bulent Borluk | 8,031 | 19.7 | −10.6 |
| Unity | Fatia Yakup | 3,021 | 7.4 | +7.4 |
| One Nation | Kane O'Connor | 2,536 | 6.2 | +6.2 |
| Democrats | Colin McDermott | 1,148 | 2.8 | +2.6 |
| Greens | Geoff Ash | 749 | 1.8 | +1.8 |
| AAFI | Chris Johnson | 620 | 1.5 | +1.5 |
| Democratic Socialist | Shane Bentley | 378 | 0.9 | +0.9 |
| Total formal votes | | 40,690 | 96.3 | +3.9 |
| Informal votes | | 1,581 | 3.7 | −3.9 |
| Turnout | | 42,271 | 93.6 | |
Two-party-preferred result
| Labor | Peter Nagle | 27,158 | 74.3 | +7.1 |
| Liberal | Bulent Borluk | 9,409 | 25.7 | −7.1 |
| Labor hold | | Swing | +7.1 | |

=== Ballina ===
1999 New South Wales state election: Ballina
| Party | Candidate | Votes | % | ±% |
|---|---|---|---|---|
| National | Don Page | 20,391 | 52.4 | −7.7 |
| Labor | Sue Dakin | 11,071 | 28.4 | +5.1 |
| Greens | Chris Flower | 3,333 | 8.6 | −0.8 |
| Democrats | Lorraine Robertson | 1,675 | 4.3 | −0.1 |
| Christian Democrats | Phillip Gosper | 1,025 | 2.6 | +2.6 |
| Independent | John MacGregor | 524 | 1.3 | +1.3 |
| Earthsave | Elise Ward | 523 | 1.3 | +1.3 |
| Timbarra Clean Water | Sue Arnold | 390 | 1.0 | +1.0 |
| Total formal votes | | 38,932 | 98.0 | +0.8 |
| Informal votes | | 805 | 32.0 | −0.8 |
| Turnout | | 39,737 | 91.8 | |
Two-party-preferred result
| National | Don Page | 21,790 | 62.0 | −4.5 |
| Labor | Sue Dakin | 13,347 | 38.0 | +4.5 |
| National hold | | Swing | −4.5 | |

=== Bankstown ===
1999 New South Wales state election: Bankstown
| Party | Candidate | Votes | % | ±% |
|---|---|---|---|---|
| Labor | Tony Stewart | 26,519 | 68.1 | +6.4 |
| Liberal | Paul Barrett | 5,755 | 14.8 | −13.2 |
| One Nation | Barry Ashe | 2,327 | 6.0 | +6.0 |
| Unity | Erick Meguid | 1,551 | 4.0 | +4.0 |
| Christian Democrats | Kylie Laurence | 838 | 2.2 | +2.2 |
| Democrats | Kate Botting | 751 | 1.9 | −2.0 |
| Greens | Kate Walsh | 666 | 1.7 | +1.7 |
| AAFI | John Bastin | 315 | 0.8 | +0.8 |
| Socialist Equality | Richard Phillips | 239 | 0.6 | +0.6 |
| Total formal votes | | 38,961 | 95.5 | +4.2 |
| Informal votes | | 1,840 | 4.5 | −4.2 |
| Turnout | | 40,801 | 91.2 | |
Two-party-preferred result
| Labor | Tony Stewart | 28,637 | 80.2 | +11.9 |
| Liberal | Paul Barrett | 7,062 | 19.8 | −11.9 |
| Labor hold | | Swing | +11.9 | |

=== Barwon ===
1999 New South Wales state election: Barwon
| Party | Candidate | Votes | % | ±% |
|---|---|---|---|---|
| National | Ian Slack-Smith | 19,994 | 51.2 | −6.1 |
| Labor | Meryl Dillon | 9,554 | 24.5 | −3.7 |
| One Nation | Bob Johns | 7,988 | 20.5 | +20.5 |
| Democrats | Ken Graham | 1,085 | 2.8 | +2.0 |
| Citizens Electoral Council | Albert Cooke | 415 | 1.1 | +1.1 |
| Total formal votes | | 39,036 | 98.3 | +3.4 |
| Informal votes | | 669 | 1.7 | −3.4 |
| Turnout | | 39,705 | 92.0 | |
Two-party-preferred result
| National | Ian Slack-Smith | 22,224 | 67.2 | −1.3 |
| Labor | Meryl Dillon | 10,865 | 32.8 | +1.3 |
| National hold | | Swing | −1.3 | |

=== Bathurst ===
1999 New South Wales state election: Bathurst
| Party | Candidate | Votes | % | ±% |
|---|---|---|---|---|
| Labor | Gerard Martin | 20,375 | 51.0 | +5.7 |
| National | Stan Wilson | 6,018 | 15.1 | −30.9 |
| Liberal | David Berry | 5,394 | 13.5 | +13.5 |
| One Nation | Warren Rowe | 3,020 | 7.6 | +7.6 |
| Independent | Joe McGinnes | 2,348 | 5.9 | +5.9 |
| Greens | Leonie Williams | 847 | 2.1 | −3.6 |
| Democrats | Cecil Grivas | 660 | 1.7 | +1.7 |
| Outdoor Recreation | Rod Gurney | 493 | 1.2 | +1.2 |
| Independent | Michael Bray | 348 | 0.9 | +0.9 |
| AAFI | Millman Ashton | 191 | 0.5 | −2.5 |
| Citizens Electoral Council | David Simpson | 149 | 0.4 | +0.4 |
| Non-Custodial Parents | Robert Thompson | 100 | 0.3 | +0.3 |
| Total formal votes | | 39,943 | 98.0 | +1.6 |
| Informal votes | | 799 | 2.0 | −1.6 |
| Turnout | | 40,742 | 95.3 | |
Two-party-preferred result
| Labor | Gerard Martin | 22,433 | 67.8 | +17.2 |
| National | Stan Wilson | 10,630 | 32.2 | −17.2 |
| Labor hold | | Swing | +17.2 | |

=== Baulkham Hills ===
1999 New South Wales state election: Baulkham Hills
| Party | Candidate | Votes | % | ±% |
|---|---|---|---|---|
| Liberal | Wayne Merton | 19,737 | 47.9 | −11.6 |
| Labor | Tony Hay | 13,206 | 32.1 | +4.3 |
| Democrats | Margaret Ferrara | 2,861 | 6.9 | +6.2 |
| One Nation | Lothar Schultejohann | 1,825 | 4.4 | +4.4 |
| Unity | Matthew Wong | 1,336 | 3.2 | +3.2 |
| Greens | Chris Harris | 1,315 | 3.2 | +3.2 |
| AAFI | Margaret King | 794 | 1.9 | −6.4 |
| Non-Custodial Parents | David Marshall | 106 | 0.3 | +0.3 |
| Total formal votes | | 41,180 | 97.6 | +1.6 |
| Informal votes | | 1,016 | 2.4 | −1.6 |
| Turnout | | 42,196 | 94.7 | |
Two-party-preferred result
| Liberal | Wayne Merton | 21,440 | 58.1 | −9.8 |
| Labor | Tony Hay | 15,439 | 41.9 | +9.8 |
| Liberal hold | | Swing | −9.8 | |

=== Bega ===
1999 New South Wales state election: Bega
| Party | Candidate | Votes | % | ±% |
|---|---|---|---|---|
| Liberal | Russell Smith | 18,253 | 45.7 | −12.8 |
| Labor | John Boland | 12,562 | 31.5 | +3.4 |
| One Nation | Robin Innes | 5,200 | 13.0 | +13.0 |
| Democrats | Denise Redmond | 1,751 | 4.4 | +0.4 |
| Greens | Kathy Freihaut | 1,465 | 3.7 | −3.1 |
| Independent | Robert Paris | 685 | 1.7 | +1.7 |
| Total formal votes | | 39,916 | 98.3 | +2.0 |
| Informal votes | | 678 | 1.7 | −2.0 |
| Turnout | | 40,594 | 93.4 | |
Two-party-preferred result
| Liberal | Russell Smith | 20,251 | 57.1 | −6.4 |
| Labor | John Boland | 15,186 | 42.9 | +6.4 |
| Liberal hold | | Swing | −6.4 | |

=== Blacktown ===
1999 New South Wales state election: Blacktown
| Party | Candidate | Votes | % | ±% |
|---|---|---|---|---|
| Labor | Paul Gibson | 22,714 | 54.7 | −2.9 |
| Liberal | Rick Holder | 8,260 | 19.9 | −10.8 |
| One Nation | Bill Nixon | 3,953 | 9.5 | +9.5 |
| Democrats | David King | 3,178 | 7.7 | +7.7 |
| Christian Democrats | Bob Bawden | 2,377 | 5.7 | +1.4 |
| AAFI | Ed Sherwood | 1,015 | 2.4 | −0.2 |
| Total formal votes | | 41,497 | 96.5 | +3.4 |
| Informal votes | | 1,497 | 3.5 | −3.4 |
| Turnout | | 42,994 | 93.9 | |
Two-party-preferred result
| Labor | Paul Gibson | 24,861 | 69.4 | +5.4 |
| Liberal | Rick Holder | 10,987 | 30.6 | −5.4 |
| Labor hold | | Swing | +5.4 | |

=== Bligh ===
1999 New South Wales state election: Bligh
| Party | Candidate | Votes | % | ±% |
|---|---|---|---|---|
| Independent | Clover Moore | 14,214 | 37.3 | +5.7 |
| Labor | Vic Smith | 12,153 | 31.9 | +4.8 |
| Liberal | Peter Fussell | 8,140 | 21.4 | −10.8 |
| Greens | Emelia Holdaway | 2,245 | 5.9 | −1.0 |
| Unity | Ariel Marguin | 621 | 1.6 | +1.6 |
| Independent | Malcolm Duncan | 280 | 0.7 | +0.7 |
| Euthanasia Referendum | Julia Trubridge | 190 | 0.5 | +0.5 |
| Timbarra Clean Water | Change Upton | 128 | 0.3 | +0.3 |
| Natural Law | Bronia Hatfield | 93 | 0.2 | −0.1 |
| Total formal votes | | 38,064 | 97.7 | +2.2 |
| Informal votes | | 883 | 2.3 | −2.2 |
| Turnout | | 38,947 | 86.0 | |
Notional two-party-preferred count
| Labor | Vic Smith | 16,528 | 61.7 | +6.3 |
| Liberal | Peter Fussell | 10,254 | 38.3 | −6.3 |
Two-candidate-preferred result
| Independent | Clover Moore | 19,636 | 59.8 | −4.0 |
| Labor | Vic Smith | 13,215 | 40.2 | +4.0 |
| Independent hold | | Swing | −4.0 | |

=== Blue Mountains ===
1999 New South Wales state election: Blue Mountains
| Party | Candidate | Votes | % | ±% |
|---|---|---|---|---|
| Labor | Bob Debus | 18,474 | 44.9 | +7.4 |
| Liberal | Jennifer Scott | 11,464 | 27.9 | −0.6 |
| Democrats | Stephen Lear | 2,944 | 7.2 | +0.3 |
| One Nation | Wayne Buckley | 2,777 | 6.8 | +6.8 |
| Greens | Adele Doust | 2,528 | 6.1 | +6.1 |
| Christian Democrats | Shirley Grigg | 1,954 | 4.7 | +0.8 |
| Earthsave | Catherine Bell | 619 | 1.5 | +1.5 |
| AAFI | Margaret Anderson | 378 | 0.9 | +0.9 |
| Total formal votes | | 41,138 | 98.3 | +1.5 |
| Informal votes | | 702 | 1.7 | −1.5 |
| Turnout | | 41,840 | 93.8 | |
Two-party-preferred result
| Labor | Bob Debus | 22,623 | 61.8 | +9.5 |
| Liberal | Jennifer Scott | 13,997 | 38.2 | −9.5 |
| Labor hold | | Swing | +9.5 | |

=== Burrinjuck ===
1999 New South Wales state election: Burrinjuck
| Party | Candidate | Votes | % | ±% |
|---|---|---|---|---|
| Labor | Michael McManus | 14,580 | 36.8 | −3.7 |
| National | Katrina Hodgkinson | 11,574 | 29.2 | +29.2 |
| Liberal | Gloria Schultz | 6,589 | 16.6 | −38.7 |
| One Nation | Don Tarlinton | 4,523 | 11.4 | +11.4 |
| Greens | Jan Green | 1,041 | 2.6 | +0.8 |
| Democrats | Peter Fraser | 657 | 1.7 | +0.4 |
| Christian Democrats | Zophia Newborne | 496 | 1.3 | +0.3 |
| Citizens Electoral Council | Lindsay Cosgrove | 157 | 0.4 | +0.4 |
| Total formal votes | | 39,617 | 98.3 | +3.6 |
| Informal votes | | 672 | 1.7 | −3.6 |
| Turnout | | 40,289 | 94.2 | |
Two-party-preferred result
| National | Katrina Hodgkinson | 17,160 | 51.2 | +51.2 |
| Labor | Michael McManus | 16,343 | 48.8 | +6.0 |
| National gain from Liberal | | Swing | −6.0 | |

=== Cabramatta ===
1999 New South Wales state election: Cabramatta
| Party | Candidate | Votes | % | ±% |
|---|---|---|---|---|
| Labor | Reba Meagher | 18,859 | 49.3 | −16.7 |
| Independent | Markus Lambert | 5,706 | 14.9 | +14.9 |
| Unity | Andrew Su | 5,286 | 13.8 | +13.8 |
| Liberal | Glenn Watson | 3,141 | 8.2 | −15.7 |
| One Nation | Peter Cornish | 1,954 | 5.1 | +5.1 |
| Independent | Ken Chapman | 1,492 | 3.9 | +3.9 |
| Christian Democrats | Jodi Luke | 634 | 1.7 | +1.7 |
| Democrats | Matthew Hua | 505 | 1.3 | −2.9 |
| Greens | Lee Grant | 461 | 1.2 | +1.2 |
| AAFI | Michael Kremec | 241 | 0.6 | +0.6 |
| Total formal votes | | 38,279 | 95.9 | +5.6 |
| Informal votes | | 1,652 | 4.1 | −5.6 |
| Turnout | | 39,931 | 92.2 | |
Notional two-party-preferred count
| Labor | Reba Meagher | 22,211 | 79.9 | +8.0 |
| Liberal | Glenn Watson | 5,586 | 20.1 | −8.0 |
Two-candidate-preferred result
| Labor | Reba Meagher | 21,144 | 68.9 | −3.0 |
| Independent | Markus Lambert | 9,555 | 31.1 | +31.1 |
| Labor hold | | Swing | −3.0 | |

=== Camden ===
1999 New South Wales state election: Camden
| Party | Candidate | Votes | % | ±% |
|---|---|---|---|---|
| Liberal | Liz Kernohan | 18,566 | 43.7 | −6.4 |
| Labor | Alex Sanchez | 15,888 | 37.4 | −0.6 |
| One Nation | Oscar Rosso | 3,809 | 9.0 | +9.0 |
| Greens | Allen Powell | 1,762 | 4.1 | +1.2 |
| Independent | Greg Frawley | 1,624 | 3.8 | +3.8 |
| AAFI | Max Brazenall | 646 | 1.5 | +1.5 |
| Non-Custodial Parents | Jason Thompson | 172 | 0.4 | +0.4 |
| Total formal votes | | 42,467 | 97.5 | +1.8 |
| Informal votes | | 1,067 | 2.5 | −1.8 |
| Turnout | | 43,534 | 94.3 | |
Two-party-preferred result
| Liberal | Liz Kernohan | 20,006 | 53.5 | −2.2 |
| Labor | Alex Sanchez | 17,393 | 46.5 | +2.2 |
| Liberal hold | | Swing | −2.2 | |

=== Campbelltown ===
1999 New South Wales state election: Campbelltown
| Party | Candidate | Votes | % | ±% |
|---|---|---|---|---|
| Labor | Michael Knight | 21,414 | 54.8 | +4.5 |
| Liberal | Paul Hawker | 8,353 | 21.4 | −10.1 |
| One Nation | Christine Dawson | 3,630 | 9.3 | +9.3 |
| Democrats | Dean Dudley | 1,639 | 4.2 | +0.3 |
| Greens | Vicki Kearney | 1,383 | 3.5 | +3.1 |
| AAFI | Ron Franks | 968 | 2.5 | −5.4 |
| Independent | Sharynne Freeman | 798 | 2.0 | +2.0 |
| Unity | Chandra Singh | 682 | 1.7 | +1.7 |
| Non-Custodial Parents | Jeffrey Churchill | 235 | 0.6 | +0.6 |
| Total formal votes | | 39,102 | 97.2 | +2.9 |
| Informal votes | | 1,133 | 2.8 | −2.9 |
| Turnout | | 40,235 | 93.5 | |
Two-party-preferred result
| Labor | Michael Knight | 23,153 | 69.9 | +9.0 |
| Liberal | Paul Hawker | 9,992 | 30.1 | −9.0 |
| Labor hold | | Swing | +9.0 | |

=== Canterbury ===
1999 New South Wales state election: Canterbury
| Party | Candidate | Votes | % | ±% |
|---|---|---|---|---|
| Labor | Kevin Moss | 22,302 | 56.5 | +1.5 |
| Liberal | Natalie Baini | 6,686 | 16.9 | −17.3 |
| Independent | John Koutsouras | 1,973 | 5.0 | +5.0 |
| Unity | Guang-Hua Wan | 1,870 | 4.7 | +4.7 |
| Greens | William Smith | 1,662 | 4.2 | +3.4 |
| Democrats | Garry Dalrymple | 1,137 | 2.9 | −0.5 |
| Christian Democrats | Michael Robinson | 1,122 | 2.8 | +2.7 |
| One Nation | Khiloud Shakir | 1,114 | 2.8 | +2.8 |
| Independent | Joshua Nam | 715 | 1.8 | +1.8 |
| Independent | Phillip Tsavellas | 691 | 1.8 | +1.8 |
| AAFI | Gerard Vanderwel | 184 | 0.5 | +0.5 |
| Total formal votes | | 39,456 | 95.7 | +5.1 |
| Informal votes | | 1,783 | 4.3 | −5.1 |
| Turnout | | 41,239 | 92.2 | |
Two-party-preferred result
| Labor | Kevin Moss | 25,871 | 75.2 | +13.5 |
| Liberal | Natalie Baini | 8,542 | 24.8 | −13.5 |
| Labor hold | | Swing | +13.5 | |

=== Cessnock ===
1999 New South Wales state election: Cessnock
| Party | Candidate | Votes | % | ±% |
|---|---|---|---|---|
| Labor | Kerry Hickey | 21,966 | 54.6 | −4.3 |
| One Nation | Graham Burston | 6,462 | 16.1 | +16.1 |
| Liberal | Mark Coure | 6,003 | 14.9 | −13.8 |
| Independent | Ian Olsen | 3,784 | 9.4 | +9.4 |
| Greens | James Ryan | 2,025 | 5.0 | +3.6 |
| Total formal votes | | 40,240 | 98.1 | +2.8 |
| Informal votes | | 760 | 1.9 | −2.8 |
| Turnout | | 41,000 | 94.8 | |
Notional two-party-preferred count
| Labor | Kerry Hickey | 25,287 | 73.9 | +7.6 |
| Liberal | Mark Coure | 8,908 | 26.1 | −7.6 |
Two-candidate-preferred result
| Labor | Kerry Hickey | 25,813 | 72.6 | +6.3 |
| One Nation | Graham Burston | 9,719 | 27.4 | +27.4 |
| Labor hold | | Swing | +6.3 | |

=== Charlestown ===
1999 New South Wales state election: Charlestown
| Party | Candidate | Votes | % | ±% |
|---|---|---|---|---|
| Labor | Richard Face | 22,300 | 54.7 | −1.9 |
| Liberal | Peter Craig | 9,078 | 22.3 | −5.0 |
| One Nation | Malcolm Sinclair | 4,157 | 10.2 | +10.2 |
| Greens | Lynden Jacobi | 2,612 | 6.4 | +5.8 |
| Independent | James Hunt | 1,409 | 3.5 | +3.5 |
| Christian Democrats | Jenny Boswell | 1,190 | 2.9 | +0.4 |
| Total formal votes | | 40,746 | 97.9 | +3.2 |
| Informal votes | | 878 | 2.1 | −3.2 |
| Turnout | | 41,624 | 95.3 | |
Two-party-preferred result
| Labor | Richard Face | 24,802 | 69.3 | +5.5 |
| Liberal | Peter Craig | 10,977 | 30.7 | −5.5 |
| Labor hold | | Swing | +5.5 | |

=== Clarence ===
1999 New South Wales state election: Clarence
| Party | Candidate | Votes | % | ±% |
|---|---|---|---|---|
| Labor | Harry Woods | 14,524 | 36.9 | +2.7 |
| National | Steve Cansdell | 10,019 | 25.4 | −24.9 |
| Liberal | Bill Day | 7,004 | 17.8 | +17.8 |
| One Nation | Marie Mathew | 4,263 | 10.8 | +10.8 |
| Greens | Karen Rooke | 1,339 | 3.4 | −0.2 |
| Christian Democrats | John Stanmore | 780 | 2.0 | +2.0 |
| Independent | Doug Behn | 551 | 1.4 | +1.4 |
| Democrats | Alec York | 518 | 1.3 | −1.7 |
| Timbarra Clean Water | Rebecca Tiffen | 152 | 0.4 | +0.4 |
| Earthsave | Jeff Milner | 151 | 0.4 | +0.4 |
| Independent | Mark McMurtrie | 101 | 0.3 | +0.3 |
| Total formal votes | | 39,402 | 98.5 | |
| Informal votes | | 594 | 1.5 | |
| Turnout | | 39,996 | 94.4 | |
Two-party-preferred result
| Labor | Harry Woods | 16,467 | 50.2 | +8.5 |
| National | Steve Cansdell | 16,324 | 49.8 | −8.5 |
| Labor hold | | Swing | +8.5 | |

=== Coffs Harbour ===
1999 New South Wales state election: Coffs Harbour
| Party | Candidate | Votes | % | ±% |
|---|---|---|---|---|
| National | Andrew Fraser | 18,043 | 46.1 | −7.0 |
| Labor | Alph Williams | 11,970 | 30.6 | +0.3 |
| One Nation | George Gardiner | 4,409 | 11.3 | +11.3 |
| Democrats | Mark Spencer | 2,361 | 6.0 | +6.0 |
| Greens | Chris Cairns | 1,369 | 3.5 | −1.9 |
| Earthsave | Chris Backman | 362 | 0.9 | +0.9 |
| Independent | Evalds Erglis | 271 | 0.7 | +0.0 |
| AAFI | Frederick Ansted | 229 | 0.6 | +0.6 |
| Non-Custodial Parents | Horst Sommer | 128 | 0.3 | +0.3 |
| Total formal votes | | 39,142 | 98.3 | +1.5 |
| Informal votes | | 692 | 1.7 | −1.5 |
| Turnout | | 39,834 | 93.3 | |
Two-party-preferred result
| National | Andrew Fraser | 19,749 | 58.3 | −0.6 |
| Labor | Alph Williams | 14,129 | 41.7 | +0.6 |
| National hold | | Swing | −0.6 | |

=== Coogee ===
1999 New South Wales state election: Coogee
| Party | Candidate | Votes | % | ±% |
|---|---|---|---|---|
| Labor | Ernie Page | 18,901 | 49.4 | +5.4 |
| Liberal | Kevin Junee | 12,498 | 32.7 | −6.6 |
| Greens | Murray Matson | 3,578 | 9.3 | −0.1 |
| Democrats | Harry Crow | 2,180 | 5.7 | +2.5 |
| One Nation | Darrel Mullins | 910 | 2.4 | +2.4 |
| AAFI | Les Black | 203 | 0.5 | −1.6 |
| Total formal votes | | 38,270 | 98.1 | +2.3 |
| Informal votes | | 761 | 1.9 | −2.3 |
| Turnout | | 39,031 | 89.7 | |
Two-party-preferred result
| Labor | Ernie Page | 22,338 | 62.3 | +6.8 |
| Liberal | Kevin Junee | 13,539 | 37.7 | −6.8 |
| Labor hold | | Swing | +6.8 | |

=== Cronulla ===
1999 New South Wales state election: Cronulla
| Party | Candidate | Votes | % | ±% |
|---|---|---|---|---|
| Liberal | Malcolm Kerr | 18,160 | 44.9 | −5.5 |
| Labor | Scott Docherty | 14,123 | 34.9 | +5.8 |
| One Nation | Jack Manasserian | 3,057 | 7.6 | +7.6 |
| Greens | Cathy Power | 1,885 | 4.7 | +4.7 |
| Democrats | Roy Day | 1,148 | 2.8 | −0.2 |
| Christian Democrats | Malcolm Smith | 1,015 | 2.5 | +0.4 |
| AAFI | Warren Feinbier | 632 | 1.6 | −1.6 |
| Independent | Patricia Poulos | 404 | 1.0 | +1.0 |
| Total formal votes | | 40,424 | 97.8 | +1.5 |
| Informal votes | | 892 | 2.2 | −1.5 |
| Turnout | | 41,316 | 93.0 | |
Two-party-preferred result
| Liberal | Malcolm Kerr | 19,785 | 55.1 | −5.2 |
| Labor | Scott Docherty | 16,137 | 44.9 | +5.2 |
| Liberal hold | | Swing | −5.2 | |

=== Davidson ===
1999 New South Wales state election: Davidson
| Party | Candidate | Votes | % | ±% |
|---|---|---|---|---|
| Liberal | Andrew Humpherson | 23,394 | 57.6 | −10.3 |
| Labor | Peter Lawson | 8,583 | 21.1 | +6.2 |
| Democrats | Scott Henderson | 2,424 | 6.0 | +0.5 |
| Greens | Peter Tuor | 1,804 | 4.4 | −0.9 |
| One Nation | Aubrey Golden | 1,531 | 3.8 | +3.8 |
| Christian Democrats | Margaret Ratcliffe | 1,278 | 3.1 | +2.3 |
| Unity | Kieran Ginges | 1,116 | 2.7 | +2.7 |
| AAFI | Ian Weatherlake | 459 | 1.1 | −2.7 |
| Total formal votes | | 40,589 | 98.0 | +1.3 |
| Informal votes | | 837 | 2.0 | −1.3 |
| Turnout | | 41,426 | 92.9 | |
Two-party-preferred result
| Liberal | Andrew Humpherson | 25,811 | 71.1 | −7.1 |
| Labor | Peter Lawson | 10,502 | 28.9 | +7.1 |
| Liberal hold | | Swing | −7.1 | |

=== Drummoyne ===
1999 New South Wales state election: Drummoyne
| Party | Candidate | Votes | % | ±% |
|---|---|---|---|---|
| Labor | John Murray | 19,253 | 46.6 | +6.2 |
| Liberal | Peter Phelps | 13,475 | 32.6 | −6.0 |
| Independent | Stephen Lesslie | 2,357 | 5.7 | +5.7 |
| Greens | Therese Doyle | 1,807 | 4.4 | −2.1 |
| Democrats | Cameron Andrews | 1,806 | 4.4 | +4.1 |
| One Nation | John Ferguson | 1,679 | 4.1 | +4.1 |
| Independent | Jennifer Paull | 638 | 1.5 | +1.5 |
| AAFI | Tony Mavin | 286 | 0.7 | +0.7 |
| Total formal votes | | 41,301 | 96.9 | +1.4 |
| Informal votes | | 1,325 | 3.1 | −1.4 |
| Turnout | | 42,626 | 93.7 | |
Two-party-preferred result
| Labor | John Murray | 22,118 | 59.4 | +6.7 |
| Liberal | Peter Phelps | 15,117 | 40.6 | −6.7 |
| Labor hold | | Swing | +6.7 | |

=== Dubbo ===
1999 New South Wales state election: Dubbo
| Party | Candidate | Votes | % | ±% |
|---|---|---|---|---|
| National | Richard Mutton | 12,597 | 31.8 | −33.4 |
| Independent | Tony McGrane | 8,977 | 22.7 | +22.7 |
| Labor | Warren Mundine | 8,016 | 20.3 | −8.2 |
| One Nation | John Neville | 7,166 | 18.1 | +18.1 |
| Independent | Peter Keough | 1,711 | 4.3 | +4.3 |
| Democrats | Chris Dunkerley | 593 | 1.5 | +0.4 |
| Greens | Cara Phillips | 513 | 1.3 | +1.3 |
| Total formal votes | | 39,573 | 98.1 | +3.0 |
| Informal votes | | 756 | 1.9 | −3.0 |
| Turnout | | 40,329 | 94.5 | |
Notional two-party-preferred count
| National | Richard Mutton | 17,734 | 60.5 | −8.9 |
| Labor | Warren Mundine | 11,566 | 39.5 | +8.9 |
Two-candidate-preferred result
| Independent | Tony McGrane | 15,358 | 50.02 | +50.0 |
| National | Richard Mutton | 15,344 | 49.98 | −19.4 |
| Independent gain from National | | Swing | +50.0 | |

=== East Hills ===
1999 New South Wales state election: East Hills
| Party | Candidate | Votes | % | ±% |
|---|---|---|---|---|
| Labor | Alan Ashton | 20,146 | 49.2 | −3.1 |
| Liberal | Nick Korovin | 7,926 | 19.4 | −8.7 |
| One Nation | Kay Bounds | 4,369 | 10.7 | +10.7 |
| Independent | Max Parker | 4,263 | 10.4 | −1.5 |
| AAFI | John Moffat | 1,369 | 3.3 | −2.2 |
| Democrats | Jeff Meikle | 1,003 | 2.5 | +1.5 |
| Greens | Colin Charlton | 919 | 2.2 | +2.2 |
| Independent | Dean Carver | 554 | 1.4 | +1.4 |
| Earthsave | Marie Coppolaro | 358 | 0.9 | +0.9 |
| Total formal votes | | 40,907 | 96.6 | +1.8 |
| Informal votes | | 1,444 | 3.4 | −1.8 |
| Turnout | | 42,351 | 94.5 | |
Two-party-preferred result
| Labor | Alan Ashton | 22,862 | 68.3 | +6.7 |
| Liberal | Nick Korovin | 10,610 | 31.7 | −6.7 |
| Labor hold | | Swing | +6.7 | |

=== Epping ===
1999 New South Wales state election: Epping
| Party | Candidate | Votes | % | ±% |
|---|---|---|---|---|
| Liberal | Andrew Tink | 17,862 | 44.1 | −13.7 |
| Labor | Steve Gurney | 11,937 | 29.5 | +5.2 |
| Democrats | Rachael Jacobs | 2,638 | 6.5 | −1.6 |
| Greens | Jamie Parker | 2,319 | 5.7 | +1.5 |
| Unity | Sung Yoo | 2,171 | 5.4 | +5.4 |
| Christian Democrats | Owen Nanelli | 1,854 | 4.6 | +4.3 |
| One Nation | Harry Ball | 1,274 | 3.1 | +3.1 |
| AAFI | Peter Bell | 461 | 1.1 | −3.6 |
| Total formal votes | | 40,516 | 98.4 | +1.6 |
| Informal votes | | 660 | 1.6 | −1.6 |
| Turnout | | 41,176 | 92.6 | |
Two-party-preferred result
| Liberal | Andrew Tink | 20,512 | 57.1 | −9.6 |
| Labor | Steve Gurney | 15,434 | 42.9 | +9.6 |
| Liberal notional hold | | Swing | −9.6 | |

=== Fairfield ===
1999 New South Wales state election: Fairfield
| Party | Candidate | Votes | % | ±% |
|---|---|---|---|---|
| Labor | Joe Tripodi | 23,362 | 60.1 | −1.5 |
| Liberal | Andrew Rohan | 5,629 | 14.5 | −16.0 |
| Unity | Thang Ngo | 3,419 | 8.8 | +8.8 |
| One Nation | Bob Vinnicombe | 2,929 | 7.5 | +7.5 |
| Christian Democrats | George Haroon | 1,188 | 3.1 | +3.0 |
| Greens | Rodrigo Gutierrez | 839 | 2.2 | +2.2 |
| Democrats | David Hua | 662 | 1.7 | −3.1 |
| AAFI | John Carey | 512 | 1.3 | +1.3 |
| Natural Law | Linda Cogger | 133 | 0.3 | −1.6 |
| Independent | Bob Aiken | 130 | 0.3 | +0.3 |
| Non-Custodial Parents | Samuel Mackenzie | 87 | 0.2 | +0.2 |
| Total formal votes | | 38,890 | 95.3 | +4.5 |
| Informal votes | | 1,911 | 4.7 | −4.5 |
| Turnout | | 40,801 | 93.0 | |
Two-party-preferred result
| Labor | Joe Tripodi | 25,891 | 78.3 | +11.9 |
| Liberal | Andrew Rohan | 7,163 | 21.7 | −11.9 |
| Labor hold | | Swing | +11.9 | |

=== Georges River ===
1999 New South Wales state election: Georges River
| Party | Candidate | Votes | % | ±% |
|---|---|---|---|---|
| Labor | Kevin Greene | 19,548 | 47.1 | +6.5 |
| Liberal | Marie Ficarra | 15,285 | 36.9 | −8.9 |
| One Nation | Andy Konnecke | 2,193 | 5.3 | +5.3 |
| Greens | John Kaye | 1,237 | 3.0 | +3.0 |
| AAFI | Brian McFarlane | 850 | 2.0 | −2.8 |
| Unity | Paul Celik | 847 | 2.0 | +2.0 |
| Independent | Deirdrei Bedwell | 838 | 2.0 | +2.0 |
| Independent | Annie Tang | 678 | 1.6 | +1.6 |
| Total formal votes | | 41,476 | 97.7 | +2.7 |
| Informal votes | | 972 | 2.3 | −2.7 |
| Turnout | | 42,448 | 93.7 | |
Two-party-preferred result
| Labor | Kevin Greene | 21,559 | 56.3 | +8.3 |
| Liberal | Marie Ficarra | 16,763 | 43.7 | −8.3 |
| Labor gain from Liberal | | Swing | +8.3 | |

=== Gosford ===
1999 New South Wales state election: Gosford
| Party | Candidate | Votes | % | ±% |
|---|---|---|---|---|
| Liberal | Chris Hartcher | 18,136 | 43.4 | −8.8 |
| Labor | Barry Cohen | 16,720 | 40.1 | −0.1 |
| One Nation | Errol Baker | 2,172 | 5.2 | +5.2 |
| Democrats | Andrew Penfold | 1,413 | 3.4 | −0.4 |
| Greens | Joanna Weckert | 1,159 | 2.8 | +2.8 |
| Christian Democrats | Gary Bailey | 1,104 | 2.6 | +2.6 |
| Earthsave | Anna Parker | 475 | 1.1 | +1.1 |
| AAFI | Isabel Gelling | 288 | 0.7 | +0.7 |
| Independent | Tom McKenna | 275 | 0.7 | +0.7 |
| Total formal votes | | 41,742 | 98.1 | +1.5 |
| Informal votes | | 824 | 1.9 | −1.5 |
| Turnout | | 42,566 | 92.6 | |
Two-party-preferred result
| Liberal | Chris Hartcher | 19,984 | 52.3 | −3.2 |
| Labor | Barry Cohen | 18,262 | 47.7 | +3.2 |
| Liberal hold | | Swing | −3.2 | |

=== Granville ===
1999 New South Wales state election: Granville
| Party | Candidate | Votes | % | ±% |
|---|---|---|---|---|
| Labor | Kim Yeadon | 22,330 | 56.3 | −3.9 |
| Liberal | Tony Issa | 11,631 | 29.3 | −1.8 |
| One Nation | Shane O'Connor | 3,599 | 9.1 | +9.1 |
| Greens | Melanie Gillbank | 1,379 | 3.5 | +3.5 |
| AAFI | David Wadsworth | 724 | 1.8 | +1.8 |
| Total formal votes | | 39,663 | 96.4 | +4.1 |
| Informal votes | | 1,489 | 3.6 | −4.1 |
| Turnout | | 41,152 | 93.1 | |
Two-party-preferred result
| Labor | Kim Yeadon | 23,720 | 64.6 | +0.4 |
| Liberal | Tony Issa | 13,011 | 35.4 | −0.4 |
| Labor hold | | Swing | +0.4 | |

=== Hawkesbury ===
1999 New South Wales state election: Hawkesbury
| Party | Candidate | Votes | % | ±% |
|---|---|---|---|---|
| Liberal | Kevin Rozzoli | 19,202 | 47.4 | −14.0 |
| Labor | Meagan Lawson | 10,094 | 24.9 | +2.7 |
| One Nation | Noeline Saxiones | 3,777 | 9.3 | +9.3 |
| Greens | Jocelyn Howden | 2,146 | 5.3 | +5.3 |
| Democrats | Arthur Rutter | 1,905 | 4.7 | −3.1 |
| Independent | Les Sheather | 1,887 | 4.7 | +4.7 |
| Independent | David Belling | 895 | 2.2 | +2.2 |
| AAFI | Geoffrey Dakin | 496 | 1.2 | +1.2 |
| Non-Custodial Parents | Ian Bruggemann | 105 | 0.3 | +0.3 |
| Total formal votes | | 40,507 | 97.7 | +2.4 |
| Informal votes | | 938 | 2.3 | −2.4 |
| Turnout | | 41,445 | 93.7 | |
Two-party-preferred result
| Liberal | Kevin Rozzoli | 21,510 | 63.3 | −8.5 |
| Labor | Meagan Lawson | 12,466 | 36.7 | +8.5 |
| Liberal hold | | Swing | −8.5 | |

=== Heathcote ===
1999 New South Wales state election: Heathcote
| Party | Candidate | Votes | % | ±% |
|---|---|---|---|---|
| Labor | Ian McManus | 19,274 | 46.9 | +3.4 |
| Liberal | Lorna Stone | 12,401 | 30.2 | −11.3 |
| One Nation | Reg Lowder | 3,400 | 8.3 | +8.3 |
| Greens | Jo-Anne Lentern | 2,300 | 5.6 | −0.6 |
| Democrats | David Holloway | 1,379 | 3.4 | +3.2 |
| Christian Democrats | Jim Bowen | 1,351 | 3.3 | −1.5 |
| AAFI | Zero Hughes | 506 | 1.2 | +1.1 |
| Outdoor Recreation | Brett McLoughlin | 382 | 0.9 | +0.9 |
| Unity | Wai Tsui | 127 | 0.3 | +0.3 |
| Total formal votes | | 41,120 | 98.1 | +1.9 |
| Informal votes | | 784 | 1.9 | −1.9 |
| Turnout | | 41,904 | 95.0 | |
Two-party-preferred result
| Labor | Ian McManus | 21,864 | 60.4 | +8.0 |
| Liberal | Lorna Stone | 14,336 | 39.6 | −8.0 |
| Labor notional hold | | Swing | +8.0 | |

=== Heffron ===
1999 New South Wales state election: Heffron
| Party | Candidate | Votes | % | ±% |
|---|---|---|---|---|
| Labor | Deirdre Grusovin | 23,492 | 63.4 | +4.1 |
| Liberal | Jackie Canessa | 7,205 | 19.4 | −6.6 |
| Greens | Jonathan Keyte | 1,992 | 5.4 | −2.7 |
| One Nation | David Taylor | 1,615 | 4.4 | +4.4 |
| Democrats | David Mendelssohn | 1,476 | 4.0 | +3.0 |
| AAFI | Rex Dobson | 952 | 2.6 | +2.6 |
| Democratic Socialist | Jim Green | 338 | 0.9 | +0.6 |
| Total formal votes | | 37,070 | 96.3 | +2.9 |
| Informal votes | | 1,440 | 3.7 | −2.9 |
| Turnout | | 38,510 | 91.3 | |
Two-party-preferred result
| Labor | Deirdre Grusovin | 25,478 | 76.1 | +6.3 |
| Liberal | Jackie Canessa | 7,998 | 23.9 | −6.3 |
| Labor hold | | Swing | +6.3 | |

=== Hornsby ===
1999 New South Wales state election: Hornsby
| Party | Candidate | Votes | % | ±% |
|---|---|---|---|---|
| Liberal | Stephen O'Doherty | 16,976 | 41.1 | −11.2 |
| Labor | Scott Cardamatis | 13,966 | 33.8 | +8.8 |
| Democrats | Alicia Swallow | 2,012 | 4.9 | −2.0 |
| Independent | Chris Meany | 1,925 | 4.7 | +4.7 |
| Independent | Mick Gallagher | 1,882 | 4.6 | −7.4 |
| One Nation | Peter Jansson | 1,679 | 4.1 | +4.1 |
| Greens | Steve Douglas | 1,554 | 3.8 | +3.8 |
| Unity | Xiaogang Zhang | 817 | 2.0 | +2.0 |
| AAFI | David Mudgee | 363 | 0.9 | −1.6 |
| Independent | Russell Howe | 141 | 0.3 | +0.3 |
| Total formal votes | | 41,315 | 97.7 | +1.5 |
| Informal votes | | 982 | 2.3 | −1.5 |
| Turnout | | 42,297 | 92.9 | |
Two-party-preferred result
| Liberal | Stephen O'Doherty | 19,065 | 52.7 | −11.0 |
| Labor | Scott Cardamatis | 17,117 | 47.3 | +11.0 |
| Liberal notional hold | | Swing | −11.0 | |

=== Illawarra ===
1999 New South Wales state election: Illawarra
| Party | Candidate | Votes | % | ±% |
|---|---|---|---|---|
| Labor | Marianne Saliba | 20,370 | 50.8 | −8.3 |
| Liberal | Kosta Jordan | 6,492 | 16.2 | −9.1 |
| One Nation | Ivan Prsa | 3,576 | 8.9 | +8.9 |
| Christian Democrats | Brian Hughes | 2,759 | 6.9 | −0.1 |
| Democrats | Penny Bartholomew | 2,017 | 5.0 | −3.6 |
| Greens | Jane Andersen | 1,865 | 4.6 | +4.6 |
| Independent | Roger Mason | 1,850 | 4.6 | +4.6 |
| AAFI | Francis Green | 656 | 1.6 | +1.6 |
| Democratic Socialist | Margaret Perrott | 336 | 0.8 | +0.8 |
| Non-Custodial Parents | Stephen Blayney | 208 | 0.5 | +0.5 |
| Total formal votes | | 40,129 | 97.2 | +3.7 |
| Informal votes | | 1,160 | 2.8 | −3.7 |
| Turnout | | 41,289 | 94.7 | |
Two-party-preferred result
| Labor | Marianne Saliba | 22,848 | 72.8 | +5.1 |
| Liberal | Kosta Jordan | 8,554 | 27.2 | −5.1 |
| Labor hold | | Swing | +5.1 | |

=== Keira ===
1999 New South Wales state election: Keira
| Party | Candidate | Votes | % | ±% |
|---|---|---|---|---|
| Labor | David Campbell | 18,293 | 45.4 | −12.8 |
| Independent | Dave Martin | 10,855 | 26.9 | +26.9 |
| Liberal | Alan Akhurst | 4,527 | 11.2 | −15.9 |
| One Nation | John Curtis | 2,678 | 6.6 | +6.6 |
| Independent | Richard Nederkoom | 1,385 | 3.4 | +3.4 |
| Christian Democrats | Robert O'Neill | 1,375 | 3.4 | −0.9 |
| Earthsave | Louise Gozzard | 855 | 2.1 | +2.1 |
| AAFI | William Hamilton | 313 | 0.8 | +0.8 |
| Total formal votes | | 40,281 | 97.9 | +2.9 |
| Informal votes | | 866 | 2.1 | −2.9 |
| Turnout | | 41,147 | 94.1 | |
Notional two-party-preferred count
| Labor | David Campbell | 22,294 | 72.1 | +4.5 |
| Liberal | Alan Akhurst | 8,635 | 27.9 | −4.5 |
Two-candidate-preferred result
| Labor | David Campbell | 19,821 | 57.9 | −9.7 |
| Independent | Dave Martin | 14,390 | 42.1 | +42.1 |
| Labor hold | | Swing | −9.7 | |

=== Kiama ===
1999 New South Wales state election: Kiama
| Party | Candidate | Votes | % | ±% |
|---|---|---|---|---|
| Labor | Matt Brown | 20,236 | 49.4 | −7.1 |
| Liberal | Charlie Mifsud | 8,936 | 21.8 | −9.9 |
| One Nation | Dan Orr | 3,765 | 9.2 | +9.2 |
| Greens | Jim Bradley | 3,157 | 7.7 | −3.9 |
| Christian Democrats | John Kadwell | 1,774 | 4.3 | +4.2 |
| Democrats | Henry Collier | 1,363 | 3.3 | +3.2 |
| Independent | Philip McLeod | 1,234 | 3.0 | +3.0 |
| AAFI | John Murray | 472 | 1.2 | +1.2 |
| Total formal votes | | 40,937 | 97.6 | +3.4 |
| Informal votes | | 1,018 | 2.4 | −3.4 |
| Turnout | | 41,955 | 94.7 | |
Two-party-preferred result
| Labor | Matt Brown | 23,048 | 67.7 | +3.1 |
| Liberal | Charlie Mifsud | 10,995 | 32.3 | −3.1 |
| Labor hold | | Swing | +3.1 | |

=== Kogarah ===
1999 New South Wales state election: Kogarah
| Party | Candidate | Votes | % | ±% |
|---|---|---|---|---|
| Labor | Cherie Burton | 19,628 | 48.0 | +1.9 |
| Liberal | Sam Witheridge | 14,226 | 34.8 | −10.6 |
| One Nation | Neil Baird | 1,752 | 4.3 | +4.3 |
| Greens | Dominic Kanak | 1,301 | 3.2 | +3.2 |
| Unity | Ilia Uzunoski | 1,244 | 3.0 | +3.0 |
| Independent | Polly Chan | 1,039 | 2.5 | +2.5 |
| Christian Democrats | Mark Ison | 838 | 2.0 | +0.5 |
| Independent | Les Crompton | 368 | 0.9 | +0.9 |
| AAFI | John Whalen | 237 | 0.6 | −0.3 |
| Outdoor Recreation | Nathan Jones | 235 | 0.6 | +0.6 |
| Non-Custodial Parents | Alexander Peniazev | 40 | 0.1 | +0.1 |
| Total formal votes | | 40,908 | 96.9 | +2.2 |
| Informal votes | | 1,308 | 3.1 | −2.2 |
| Turnout | | 42,216 | 92.6 | |
Two-party-preferred result
| Labor | Cherie Burton | 21,381 | 57.5 | +6.9 |
| Liberal | Sam Witheridge | 15,784 | 42.5 | −6.9 |
| Labor hold | | Swing | +6.9 | |

=== Ku-ring-gai ===
1999 New South Wales state election: Ku-ring-gai
| Party | Candidate | Votes | % | ±% |
|---|---|---|---|---|
| Liberal | Barry O'Farrell | 22,708 | 56.3 | −10.1 |
| Labor | Jan Butland | 8,241 | 20.4 | +7.2 |
| Democrats | Neil Halliday | 3,769 | 9.3 | +1.4 |
| Greens | Andrew Burke | 2,004 | 5.0 | +1.4 |
| Christian Democrats | Matthew Ayres | 1,698 | 4.2 | +2.8 |
| One Nation | Robert Webeck | 1,416 | 3.5 | +3.5 |
| AAFI | Mick Chehoff | 379 | 0.9 | +0.3 |
| Natural Law | John Ryder | 100 | 0.2 | +0.2 |
| Total formal votes | | 40,315 | 98.3 | +1.3 |
| Informal votes | | 710 | 1.7 | −1.3 |
| Turnout | | 41,025 | 92.4 | |
Two-party-preferred result
| Liberal | Barry O'Farrell | 25,298 | 70.0 | −8.3 |
| Labor | Jan Butland | 10,826 | 30.0 | +8.3 |
| Liberal hold | | Swing | −8.3 | |

=== Lachlan ===
1999 New South Wales state election: Lachlan
| Party | Candidate | Votes | % | ±% |
|---|---|---|---|---|
| National | Ian Armstrong | 22,798 | 55.1 | +10.5 |
| Labor | Tony Lord | 11,385 | 27.5 | −4.0 |
| One Nation | Wilf Reid | 5,383 | 13.0 | +13.0 |
| Democrats | Peter Mulligan | 1,124 | 2.7 | +0.6 |
| Greens | Mike Durrant | 689 | 1.7 | +1.7 |
| Total formal votes | | 41,379 | 98.0 | +3.6 |
| Informal votes | | 854 | 2.0 | −3.6 |
| Turnout | | 42,233 | 94.9 | |
Two-party-preferred result
| National | Ian Armstrong | 24,940 | 66.3 | −1.0 |
| Labor | Tony Lord | 12,680 | 33.7 | +1.0 |
| National hold | | Swing | −1.0 | |

=== Lake Macquarie ===
1999 New South Wales state election: Lake Macquarie
| Party | Candidate | Votes | % | ±% |
|---|---|---|---|---|
| Labor | Jeff Hunter | 22,821 | 54.8 | −6.1 |
| Liberal | Don Payne | 9,333 | 22.4 | −8.8 |
| One Nation | Robert Johnson | 5,073 | 12.2 | +12.2 |
| Greens | David Blyth | 2,130 | 5.1 | +5.1 |
| Christian Democrats | Ros Gourlay | 1,370 | 3.3 | +3.3 |
| AAFI | Bob Boulton | 912 | 2.2 | +2.2 |
| Total formal votes | | 41,639 | 97.9 | +3.3 |
| Informal votes | | 898 | 2.1 | −3.3 |
| Turnout | | 42,537 | 94.4 | |
Two-party-preferred result
| Labor | Jeff Hunter | 25,065 | 69.2 | +4.1 |
| Liberal | Don Payne | 11,134 | 30.8 | −4.1 |
| Labor hold | | Swing | +4.1 | |

=== Lakemba ===
1999 New South Wales state election: Lakemba
| Party | Candidate | Votes | % | ±% |
|---|---|---|---|---|
| Labor | Morris Iemma | 24,457 | 63.2 | +4.5 |
| Liberal | Michael Hawatt | 6,588 | 17.0 | −14.7 |
| Independent | Barbara Coorey | 3,896 | 10.1 | +10.1 |
| One Nation | Hussein Abou-Ghaida | 1,487 | 3.8 | +3.8 |
| Democrats | Richard Newman | 1,181 | 3.1 | +0.7 |
| AAFI | Tom Moody | 1,079 | 2.8 | +2.8 |
| Total formal votes | | 38,688 | 96.4 | +3.8 |
| Informal votes | | 1,463 | 3.6 | −3.8 |
| Turnout | | 40,151 | 92.4 | |
Two-party-preferred result
| Labor | Morris Iemma | 26,536 | 74.7 | +10.0 |
| Liberal | Michael Hawatt | 8,998 | 25.3 | −10.0 |
| Labor hold | | Swing | +10.0 | |

=== Lane Cove ===
1999 New South Wales state election: Lane Cove
| Party | Candidate | Votes | % | ±% |
|---|---|---|---|---|
| Liberal | Kerry Chikarovski | 19,896 | 49.8 | +1.2 |
| Labor | Brad Powe | 12,911 | 32.3 | +8.5 |
| Democrats | David Harcourt-Norton | 3,665 | 9.2 | +3.8 |
| Greens | Suzy Orme | 2,060 | 5.2 | +2.2 |
| One Nation | Joanne May | 1,092 | 2.7 | +2.7 |
| AAFI | Bernd Rindermann | 357 | 0.9 | +0.3 |
| Total formal votes | | 39,981 | 97.7 | +1.2 |
| Informal votes | | 958 | 2.3 | −1.2 |
| Turnout | | 40,939 | 91.8 | |
Two-party-preferred result
| Liberal | Kerry Chikarovski | 21,379 | 57.4 | −4.9 |
| Labor | Brad Powe | 15,846 | 42.6 | +4.9 |
| Liberal hold | | Swing | −4.9 | |

=== Lismore ===
1999 New South Wales state election: Lismore
| Party | Candidate | Votes | % | ±% |
|---|---|---|---|---|
| National | Thomas George | 15,238 | 39.2 | −19.2 |
| Labor | Kevin Bell | 10,779 | 27.7 | +3.4 |
| Liberal | John Howard | 5,260 | 13.5 | +13.5 |
| Greens | John Corkill | 3,784 | 9.7 | +8.4 |
| Christian Democrats | Ray Dhu | 1,426 | 3.7 | +3.7 |
| Democrats | Matthew Walsh | 1,270 | 3.3 | −0.3 |
| Democratic Socialist | Bernie Wunsch | 322 | 0.8 | +0.8 |
| Independent | Judy Canales | 311 | 0.8 | +0.8 |
| Earthsave | Ray Thorpe | 300 | 0.8 | +0.8 |
| Timbarra Clean Water | Matthew Ward | 217 | 0.6 | +0.6 |
| Total formal votes | | 38,907 | 98.2 | +2.0 |
| Informal votes | | 725 | 1.8 | −2.0 |
| Turnout | | 39,632 | 93.8 | |
Two-party-preferred result
| National | Thomas George | 19,293 | 58.5 | −5.8 |
| Labor | Kevin Bell | 13,675 | 41.5 | +5.8 |
| National hold | | Swing | −5.8 | |

=== Liverpool ===
1999 New South Wales state election: Liverpool
| Party | Candidate | Votes | % | ±% |
|---|---|---|---|---|
| Labor | Paul Lynch | 26,754 | 67.0 | −3.3 |
| Liberal | David Barker | 6,773 | 17.0 | −12.1 |
| One Nation | Rod Smith | 3,546 | 8.9 | +8.9 |
| Unity | Ricky Costa | 1,662 | 4.2 | +4.2 |
| AAFI | John Coleman | 839 | 2.1 | +2.1 |
| Citizens Electoral Council | Steve Henshaw | 226 | 0.6 | +0.6 |
| Non-Custodial Parents | Eric Sanders | 151 | 0.4 | +0.4 |
| Total formal votes | | 39,951 | 96.0 | +7.8 |
| Informal votes | | 1,682 | 4.0 | −7.8 |
| Turnout | | 41,633 | 92.3 | |
Two-party-preferred result
| Labor | Paul Lynch | 28,153 | 78.6 | +8.0 |
| Liberal | David Barker | 7,666 | 21.4 | −8.0 |
| Labor hold | | Swing | +8.0 | |

=== Londonderry ===
1999 New South Wales state election: Londonderry
| Party | Candidate | Votes | % | ±% |
|---|---|---|---|---|
| Labor | Jim Anderson | 19,369 | 49.0 | −6.6 |
| Liberal | Kevin Conolly | 9,877 | 25.0 | −8.7 |
| One Nation | Stephen Burke | 4,406 | 11.1 | +11.1 |
| Christian Democrats | John Phillips | 1,407 | 3.6 | +1.7 |
| Greens | Ross Kingsley | 1,341 | 3.4 | +3.4 |
| Democrats | Jim Cassidy | 1,305 | 3.3 | −3.5 |
| Independent | Dion Bailey | 1,026 | 2.6 | +2.6 |
| AAFI | Lachlan Gelling | 611 | 1.5 | +1.5 |
| Non-Custodial Parents | Allan Holmes | 185 | 0.5 | +0.5 |
| Total formal votes | | 39,527 | 96.4 | +2.8 |
| Informal votes | | 1,494 | 3.6 | −2.8 |
| Turnout | | 41,021 | 92.7 | |
Two-party-preferred result
| Labor | Jim Anderson | 21,145 | 64.9 | +3.3 |
| Liberal | Kevin Conolly | 11,436 | 35.1 | −3.3 |
| Labor hold | | Swing | +3.3 | |

=== Macquarie Fields ===
1999 New South Wales state election: Macquarie Fields
| Party | Candidate | Votes | % | ±% |
|---|---|---|---|---|
| Labor | Craig Knowles | 25,223 | 61.9 | +5.2 |
| Liberal | Jai Rowell | 8,512 | 20.9 | −11.3 |
| One Nation | Stuart Horton | 3,660 | 9.0 | +9.0 |
| Democrats | Emanuela Lang | 1,226 | 3.0 | +2.9 |
| AAFI | Jane Field | 1,044 | 2.6 | −2.1 |
| Independent | Mick Allen | 824 | 2.0 | +0.6 |
| Non-Custodial Parents | Scott Thompson | 252 | 0.6 | +0.6 |
| Total formal votes | | 40,741 | 96.8 | +4.0 |
| Informal votes | | 1,361 | 3.2 | −4.0 |
| Turnout | | 42,102 | 92.4 | |
Two-party-preferred result
| Labor | Craig Knowles | 26,705 | 73.5 | +10.5 |
| Liberal | Jai Rowell | 9,620 | 26.5 | −10.5 |
| Labor notional hold | | Swing | +10.5 | |

=== Maitland ===
1999 New South Wales state election: Maitland
| Party | Candidate | Votes | % | ±% |
|---|---|---|---|---|
| Labor | John Price | 18,563 | 42.9 | −0.6 |
| Liberal | Peter Blackmore | 17,729 | 41.0 | −6.7 |
| One Nation | Phillip Harper | 3,452 | 8.0 | +8.0 |
| Greens | Jan Davis | 1,282 | 3.0 | −2.9 |
| Democrats | James Lantry | 766 | 1.8 | −1.2 |
| Christian Democrats | Paul Kerslake | 610 | 1.4 | +1.4 |
| Outdoor Recreation | Bob Taylor | 518 | 1.2 | +1.2 |
| Citizens Electoral Council | Ann Lawler | 359 | 0.8 | +0.8 |
| Total formal votes | | 43,279 | 98.6 | +2.3 |
| Informal votes | | 619 | 1.4 | −2.3 |
| Turnout | | 43,898 | 96.0 | |
Two-party-preferred result
| Labor | John Price | 20,102 | 51.0 | +1.9 |
| Liberal | Peter Blackmore | 19,347 | 49.0 | −1.9 |
| Labor gain from Liberal | | Swing | +1.9 | |

=== Manly ===
1999 New South Wales state election: Manly
| Party | Candidate | Votes | % | ±% |
|---|---|---|---|---|
| Liberal | Darren Jones | 15,424 | 38.7 | −6.2 |
| Independent | David Barr | 12,005 | 30.2 | −4.0 |
| Labor | David de Montfort | 6,705 | 16.8 | +1.2 |
| Greens | Judy Lambert | 2,054 | 5.2 | +5.2 |
| One Nation | Christine Ferguson | 1,595 | 4.0 | +4.0 |
| Democrats | Antony Howells | 1,004 | 2.5 | −0.4 |
| Outdoor Recreation | Peter Stitt | 347 | 0.9 | +0.9 |
| Unity | Chris Wong | 337 | 0.8 | +0.8 |
| AAFI | Peter Ecroyd | 335 | 0.8 | +0.2 |
| Total formal votes | | 39,806 | 97.9 | +1.1 |
| Informal votes | | 869 | 2.1 | −1.1 |
| Turnout | | 40,675 | 92.4 | |
Notional two-party-preferred count
| Liberal | Darren Jones | 17,671 | 59.4 | −4.0 |
| Labor | David de Montfort | 12,069 | 40.6 | +4.0 |
Two-candidate-preferred result
| Independent | David Barr | 17,408 | 51.3 | +1.9 |
| Liberal | Darren Jones | 16,553 | 48.7 | −1.9 |
| Independent gain from Independent | | Swing | +1.9 | |

The sitting member Peter Macdonald (Independent) did not contest the election.

=== Maroubra ===
1999 New South Wales state election: Maroubra
| Party | Candidate | Votes | % | ±% |
|---|---|---|---|---|
| Labor | Bob Carr | 23,393 | 59.3 | +2.2 |
| Liberal | Tio Faulkner | 9,523 | 24.1 | −9.3 |
| Greens | Jules Bastable | 2,009 | 5.1 | −1.3 |
| One Nation | Jack McEwen | 1,926 | 4.9 | +4.9 |
| Democrats | Paul Corben | 1,292 | 3.3 | +0.4 |
| Unity | Nagaty Hassan | 991 | 2.5 | +2.5 |
| AAFI | Cecilia Paton | 312 | 0.8 | +0.7 |
| Total formal votes | | 39,446 | 97.1 | +2.3 |
| Informal votes | | 1,187 | 2.9 | −2.3 |
| Turnout | | 40,633 | 92.1 | |
Two-party-preferred result
| Labor | Bob Carr | 25,293 | 69.9 | +6.3 |
| Liberal | Tio Faulkner | 10,867 | 30.1 | −6.3 |
| Labor hold | | Swing | +6.3 | |

=== Marrickville ===
1999 New South Wales state election: Marrickville
| Party | Candidate | Votes | % | ±% |
|---|---|---|---|---|
| Labor | Andrew Refshauge | 21,311 | 53.8 | +7.1 |
| Liberal | Jonathan Morris | 5,351 | 13.5 | −1.3 |
| Greens | Sean Roberts | 4,662 | 11.8 | +5.1 |
| Democrats | Peter Kenyon | 3,425 | 8.6 | +4.0 |
| One Nation | Jill Brown | 1,661 | 4.2 | +4.2 |
| Independent | Morris Tadros | 989 | 2.5 | +2.5 |
| Unity | Gordon The | 904 | 2.3 | +2.3 |
| Christian Democrats | Christopher Hallett | 607 | 1.5 | +1.2 |
| Democratic Socialist | Tuntuni Bhattacharyya | 443 | 1.1 | +0.2 |
| Euthanasia Referendum | Ann Overend | 279 | 0.7 | +0.7 |
| Total formal votes | | 39,632 | 96.7 | +3.0 |
| Informal votes | | 1,370 | 3.3 | −3.0 |
| Turnout | | 41,002 | 89.5 | |
Notional two-party-preferred count
| Labor | Andrew Refshauge | 26,389 | 79.4 | +4.6 |
| Liberal | Jonathan Morris | 6,835 | 20.6 | −4.6 |
Two-candidate-preferred result
| Labor | Andrew Refshauge | 23,524 | 71.5 | −3.4 |
| Greens | Sean Roberts | 9,394 | 28.5 | +28.5 |
| Labor hold | | Swing | −3.4 | |

=== Menai ===
1999 New South Wales state election: Menai
| Party | Candidate | Votes | % | ±% |
|---|---|---|---|---|
| Labor | Alison Megarrity | 18,048 | 43.2 | +1.9 |
| Liberal | Brett Thomas | 15,434 | 37.0 | −8.0 |
| One Nation | Dorothy Hutton | 3,360 | 8.0 | +8.0 |
| Greens | Jim McGoldrick | 1,743 | 4.2 | +4.2 |
| Independent | Bob May | 1,235 | 3.0 | +3.0 |
| Democrats | Anthony Mayne | 1,216 | 2.9 | +2.9 |
| AAFI | Robert Wardle | 711 | 1.7 | −2.3 |
| Total formal votes | | 41,747 | 97.1 | +1.6 |
| Informal votes | | 1,242 | 2.9 | −1.6 |
| Turnout | | 42,989 | 94.3 | |
Two-party-preferred result
| Labor | Alison Megarrity | 20,166 | 54.2 | +6.1 |
| Liberal | Brett Thomas | 17,044 | 45.8 | −6.1 |
| Labor notional gain from Liberal | | Swing | +6.1 | |

=== Miranda ===
1999 New South Wales state election: Miranda
| Party | Candidate | Votes | % | ±% |
|---|---|---|---|---|
| Labor | Barry Collier | 16,996 | 42.9 | +6.0 |
| Liberal | Ron Phillips | 16,099 | 40.6 | −7.5 |
| One Nation | Max Remy | 2,842 | 7.2 | +7.2 |
| Greens | Kerry Nettle | 1,612 | 4.1 | +4.1 |
| Democrats | Syd Hickman | 1,460 | 3.7 | +0.7 |
| AAFI | Keith Eastwood | 620 | 1.6 | −2.2 |
| Total formal votes | | 39,629 | 98.0 | +1.4 |
| Informal votes | | 805 | 2.0 | −1.4 |
| Turnout | | 40,434 | 94.4 | |
Two-party-preferred result
| Labor | Barry Collier | 19,002 | 52.3 | +7.5 |
| Liberal | Ron Phillips | 17,353 | 47.7 | −7.5 |
| Labor gain from Liberal | | Swing | +7.5 | |

=== Monaro ===
1999 New South Wales state election: Monaro
| Party | Candidate | Votes | % | ±% |
|---|---|---|---|---|
| Labor | John Durst | 12,076 | 31.7 | +5.2 |
| National | Peter Webb | 8,477 | 22.2 | −35.8 |
| Liberal | Ian Marjason | 7,521 | 19.7 | +18.9 |
| Independent | Frank Pangallo | 4,822 | 12.6 | +12.6 |
| One Nation | Matthew Swift | 2,855 | 7.5 | +7.5 |
| Greens | Catherine Moore | 1,809 | 4.7 | −2.9 |
| Independent | Frank Fragiacomo | 419 | 1.1 | +1.1 |
| Independent | Earle Keegel | 145 | 0.4 | +0.4 |
| Total formal votes | | 38,124 | 97.7 | +2.0 |
| Informal votes | | 885 | 2.3 | −2.0 |
| Turnout | | 39,009 | 92.4 | |
Two-party-preferred result
| National | Peter Webb | 15,175 | 50.2 | −16.1 |
| Labor | John Durst | 15,047 | 49.8 | +16.1 |
| National hold | | Swing | −16.1 | |

=== Mount Druitt ===
1999 New South Wales state election: Mount Druitt
| Party | Candidate | Votes | % | ±% |
|---|---|---|---|---|
| Labor | Richard Amery | 23,812 | 59.6 | −7.0 |
| Liberal | Allan Green | 6,399 | 16.0 | −7.6 |
| One Nation | Nev Williams | 3,458 | 8.7 | +8.7 |
| Christian Democrats | Joseph Wyness | 1,812 | 4.5 | +0.1 |
| Democrats | Peter Reddy | 1,517 | 3.8 | +3.6 |
| Greens | Bob Nolan | 1,148 | 2.9 | +2.9 |
| Unity | Leila Toal | 1,133 | 2.8 | +2.8 |
| AAFI | Robert Girvan | 651 | 1.6 | +1.6 |
| Total formal votes | | 39,930 | 96.5 | +3.7 |
| Informal votes | | 1,467 | 3.5 | −3.7 |
| Turnout | | 41,397 | 93.0 | |
Two-party-preferred result
| Labor | Richard Amery | 26,038 | 75.8 | +3.7 |
| Liberal | Allan Green | 8,322 | 24.2 | −3.7 |
| Labor hold | | Swing | +3.7 | |

=== Mulgoa ===
1999 New South Wales state election: Mulgoa
| Party | Candidate | Votes | % | ±% |
|---|---|---|---|---|
| Labor | Diane Beamer | 21,413 | 53.1 | −1.2 |
| Liberal | Christine Bourne | 9,772 | 24.2 | −13.5 |
| One Nation | Rick Putra | 3,569 | 8.9 | +8.9 |
| Democrats | Andrew Owen | 1,282 | 3.2 | +0.7 |
| No Badgerys Creek Airport | Al Mewett | 1,196 | 3.0 | +3.0 |
| Greens | Peter Grant | 791 | 2.0 | +2.0 |
| Gun Owners and Sporting Hunters Rights | Val Horton | 711 | 1.8 | +1.8 |
| Republic 2001 | Simon Hedges | 450 | 1.1 | +1.1 |
| AAFI | James Carey | 407 | 1.0 | +1.0 |
| Outdoor Recreation | Leah Mathews | 403 | 1.0 | +1.0 |
| People First | Brent Lawson | 188 | 0.5 | +0.5 |
| Non-Custodial Parents | Ian Owens | 121 | 0.3 | +0.3 |
| Total formal votes | | 40,303 | 96.3 | +1.8 |
| Informal votes | | 1,555 | 3.7 | −1.8 |
| Turnout | | 41,858 | 93.6 | |
Two-party-preferred result
| Labor | Diane Beamer | 22,993 | 67.6 | +8.9 |
| Liberal | Christine Bourne | 11,029 | 32.4 | −8.9 |
| Labor notional hold | | Swing | +8.9 | |

=== Murray-Darling ===
1999 New South Wales state election: Murray-Darling
| Party | Candidate | Votes | % | ±% |
|---|---|---|---|---|
| Labor | Peter Black | 16,781 | 44.2 | −1.2 |
| National | Mark Kersten | 13,790 | 36.3 | −15.6 |
| One Nation | Don McKinnon | 6,238 | 16.4 | +16.4 |
| Democrats | Dave Burton | 792 | 2.1 | +2.1 |
| Citizens Electoral Council | Alan Boyd | 246 | 0.6 | +0.6 |
| Non-Custodial Parents | John White | 141 | 0.4 | +0.4 |
| Total formal votes | | 37,988 | 98.1 | +4.4 |
| Informal votes | | 727 | 1.9 | −4.4 |
| Turnout | | 38,715 | 90.7 | |
Two-party-preferred result
| Labor | Peter Black | 17,765 | 54.2 | +7.7 |
| National | Mark Kersten | 15,002 | 45.8 | −7.7 |
| Labor notional gain from National | | Swing | +7.7 | |

=== Murrumbidgee ===
1999 New South Wales state election: Murrumbidgee
| Party | Candidate | Votes | % | ±% |
|---|---|---|---|---|
| National | Adrian Piccoli | 22,024 | 54.5 | −9.5 |
| Labor | Patrick Pittavino | 13,225 | 32.7 | −3.4 |
| One Nation | Les Mulloy | 3,378 | 8.4 | +8.4 |
| Democrats | Sylvia Ramsay | 1,546 | 3.8 | +3.8 |
| Citizens Electoral Council | Lee Stroobants | 271 | 0.7 | +0.7 |
| Total formal votes | | 40,444 | 97.9 | +4.3 |
| Informal votes | | 875 | 2.1 | −4.3 |
| Turnout | | 41,319 | 93.8 | |
Two-party-preferred result
| National | Adrian Piccoli | 23,261 | 62.0 | −1.9 |
| Labor | Patrick Pittavino | 14,269 | 38.0 | +1.9 |
| National hold | | Swing | −1.9 | |

=== Myall Lakes ===
1999 New South Wales state election: Myall Lakes
| Party | Candidate | Votes | % | ±% |
|---|---|---|---|---|
| National | John Turner | 20,841 | 51.3 | −3.6 |
| Labor | Mike Tuffy | 11,922 | 29.4 | +2.0 |
| One Nation | Jason Deeney | 5,522 | 13.6 | +13.6 |
| Greens | Linda Gill | 1,717 | 4.2 | −2.0 |
| AAFI | Ken Spragg | 591 | 1.5 | −4.9 |
| Total formal votes | | 40,593 | 98.3 | +3.0 |
| Informal votes | | 701 | 1.7 | −3.0 |
| Turnout | | 41,294 | 94.5 | |
Two-party-preferred result
| National | John Turner | 22,531 | 62.9 | −4.3 |
| Labor | Mike Tuffy | 13,314 | 37.1 | +4.3 |
| National hold | | Swing | −4.3 | |

=== Newcastle ===
1999 New South Wales state election: Newcastle
| Party | Candidate | Votes | % | ±% |
|---|---|---|---|---|
| Labor | Bryce Gaudry | 21,644 | 53.1 | −3.7 |
| Liberal | David Williams | 8,208 | 20.1 | −8.6 |
| Greens | Ian McKenzie | 4,062 | 10.0 | −2.7 |
| One Nation | Sharyn Brooks | 3,468 | 8.5 | +8.5 |
| Democrats | Stephen Bisgrove | 1,802 | 4.4 | +4.4 |
| Independent | Harry Criticos | 899 | 2.2 | +2.2 |
| Democratic Socialist | Geoff Payne | 343 | 0.8 | −0.9 |
| Socialist Equality | Terry Cook | 163 | 0.4 | +0.4 |
| Unity | Chris Brookman | 101 | 0.2 | +0.2 |
| Citizens Electoral Council | Dennis Chaston | 77 | 0.2 | +0.2 |
| Total formal votes | | 40,767 | 97.4 | +2.6 |
| Informal votes | | 1,101 | 2.6 | −2.6 |
| Turnout | | 41,868 | 93.0 | |
Two-party-preferred result
| Labor | Bryce Gaudry | 24,925 | 72.4 | +5.5 |
| Liberal | David Williams | 9,510 | 27.6 | −5.5 |
| Labor hold | | Swing | +5.5 | |

=== North Shore ===
1999 New South Wales state election: North Shore
| Party | Candidate | Votes | % | ±% |
|---|---|---|---|---|
| Liberal | Jillian Skinner | 20,994 | 53.9 | −8.2 |
| Labor | Janet McDonald | 10,888 | 27.9 | +7.8 |
| Democrats | Brenda Padgett | 3,121 | 8.0 | −1.3 |
| Greens | David Bell | 2,743 | 7.0 | −0.8 |
| One Nation | David Kelly | 867 | 2.2 | +2.2 |
| AAFI | Lindon Dedman | 346 | 0.9 | +0.2 |
| Total formal votes | | 38,959 | 98.3 | +1.6 |
| Informal votes | | 386 | 1.7 | −1.6 |
| Turnout | | 39,645 | 88.8 | |
Two-party-preferred result
| Liberal | Jillian Skinner | 22,495 | 62.3 | −8.0 |
| Labor | Janet McDonald | 13,624 | 37.7 | +8.0 |
| Liberal hold | | Swing | −8.0 | |

=== Northern Tablelands ===
1999 New South Wales state election: Northern Tablelands
| Party | Candidate | Votes | % | ±% |
|---|---|---|---|---|
| Independent | Richard Torbay | 17,329 | 44.2 | +25.0 |
| National | Ray Chappell | 13,381 | 34.1 | −18.7 |
| Labor | Martin Lawrence | 3,598 | 9.2 | −14.9 |
| One Nation | John Webeck | 2,770 | 7.1 | +7.1 |
| Democrats | Merran Cooper | 1,092 | 2.8 | +2.6 |
| Greens | Pat Schultz | 719 | 1.8 | +1.8 |
| Independent | Noel Keogh | 360 | 0.9 | +0.9 |
| Total formal votes | | 39,249 | 98.7 | +3.0 |
| Informal votes | | 509 | 1.3 | −3.0 |
| Turnout | | 39,758 | 93.9 | |
Notional two-party-preferred count
| National | Ray Chappell | 18,063 | 67.7 | +3.1 |
| Labor | Martin Lawrence | 8,612 | 32.3 | −3.1 |
Two-candidate-preferred result
| Independent | Richard Torbay | 21,162 | 59.4 | +59.4 |
| National | Ray Chappell | 14,482 | 40.6 | −24.0 |
| Independent gain from National | | Swing | N/A | |

=== Orange ===
1999 New South Wales state election: Orange
| Party | Candidate | Votes | % | ±% |
|---|---|---|---|---|
| National | Russell Turner | 16,566 | 41.6 | −19.7 |
| Labor | Glenn Taylor | 12,878 | 32.3 | +3.0 |
| One Nation | Terry Nixon | 5,036 | 12.6 | +12.6 |
| Independent | Dave Cox | 1,793 | 4.5 | +4.5 |
| Christian Democrats | Michael McLennan | 1,305 | 3.3 | +0.2 |
| Greens | Ian Watts | 1,228 | 3.1 | +3.1 |
| Democrats | Andrew McKenzie | 1,059 | 2.7 | +1.3 |
| Total formal votes | | 39,865 | 98.0 | +2.3 |
| Informal votes | | 824 | 2.0 | −2.3 |
| Turnout | | 40,689 | 94.7 | |
Two-party-preferred result
| National | Russell Turner | 19,041 | 56.3 | −10.8 |
| Labor | Glenn Taylor | 14,765 | 43.7 | +10.8 |
| National hold | | Swing | −10.8 | |

=== Oxley ===
1999 New South Wales state election: Oxley
| Party | Candidate | Votes | % | ±% |
|---|---|---|---|---|
| National | Andrew Stoner | 14,187 | 36.3 | −24.4 |
| Labor | Jacquie Argent | 9,548 | 24.4 | −5.2 |
| One Nation | John Willey | 7,366 | 18.8 | +18.8 |
| Independent | Betty Green | 2,726 | 7.0 | +7.0 |
| Independent | Paul Parkinson | 2,011 | 5.1 | +5.1 |
| Greens | Sally Cavanagh | 1,495 | 3.8 | −2.5 |
| Democrats | Brigitte Williams | 1,089 | 2.8 | +2.8 |
| Independent | Tom Henderson | 686 | 1.8 | +1.8 |
| Total formal votes | | 39,108 | 98.1 | +1.8 |
| Informal votes | | 770 | 1.9 | −1.8 |
| Turnout | | 39,878 | 93.7 | |
Two-party-preferred result
| National | Andrew Stoner | 17,503 | 58.0 | −6.6 |
| Labor | Jacquie Argent | 12,687 | 42.0 | +6.6 |
| National hold | | Swing | −6.6 | |

=== Parramatta ===
1999 New South Wales state election: Parramatta
| Party | Candidate | Votes | % | ±% |
|---|---|---|---|---|
| Labor | Gabrielle Harrison | 21,466 | 53.6 | +5.6 |
| Liberal | Moira Copping | 12,023 | 30.0 | −10.9 |
| One Nation | Terry Cooksley | 1,953 | 4.9 | +4.9 |
| Unity | Rodney McCarthy | 1,426 | 3.6 | +3.6 |
| Democrats | Peter Byrne | 1,280 | 3.2 | −1.4 |
| Greens | Peter Wright | 1,063 | 2.7 | +2.7 |
| AAFI | Lindsay Butler | 360 | 0.9 | +0.9 |
| Democratic Socialist | Kylie Moon | 257 | 0.6 | +0.6 |
| Natural Law | John Cogger | 101 | 0.3 | −0.3 |
| Non-Custodial Parents | Michael McMahon | 84 | 0.2 | +0.2 |
| Total formal votes | | 40,013 | 97.3 | +2.8 |
| Informal votes | | 1,094 | 2.7 | −2.8 |
| Turnout | | 41,107 | 91.0 | |
Two-party-preferred result
| Labor | Gabrielle Harrison | 23,472 | 64.5 | +11.0 |
| Liberal | Moira Copping | 12,915 | 35.5 | −11.0 |
| Labor hold | | Swing | +11.0 | |

=== Peats ===
1999 New South Wales state election: Peats
| Party | Candidate | Votes | % | ±% |
|---|---|---|---|---|
| Labor | Marie Andrews | 20,451 | 49.9 | −2.3 |
| Liberal | Debra Wales | 12,803 | 31,3 | −7.4 |
| One Nation | Jeffrey Prest | 2,767 | 6.8 | +6.8 |
| Democrats | Geoff Preece | 1,598 | 3.9 | +3.9 |
| Greens | Stephen Lacey | 1,194 | 2.9 | +2.9 |
| Christian Democrats | Sue Spencer | 1,104 | 2.7 | +2.7 |
| AAFI | Ian King | 461 | 1.1 | +1.1 |
| Earthsave | Norm Purcival | 372 | 0.9 | +0.9 |
| Unity | Xiong Guo | 193 | 0.5 | +0.5 |
| Total formal votes | | 40,943 | 97.5 | +2.5 |
| Informal votes | | 1,040 | 2.5 | −2.5 |
| Turnout | | 41,983 | 94.2 | |
Two-party-preferred result
| Labor | Marie Andrews | 22,397 | 61.3 | +3.6 |
| Liberal | Debra Wales | 14,114 | 38.7 | −3.6 |
| Labor hold | | Swing | +3.6 | |

=== Penrith ===
1999 New South Wales state election: Penrith
| Party | Candidate | Votes | % | ±% |
|---|---|---|---|---|
| Labor | Faye Lo Po' | 21,467 | 53.2 | +5.4 |
| Liberal | Ross Fowler | 10,154 | 25.2 | −15.5 |
| One Nation | Jean Eykamp | 3,523 | 8.7 | +8.7 |
| Christian Democrats | Brian Grigg | 1,425 | 3.5 | −0.2 |
| Greens | Lesley Edwards | 1,230 | 3.0 | +3.0 |
| Democrats | Richard Villa | 933 | 2.3 | −0.5 |
| AAFI | David Morris | 366 | 0.9 | +0.9 |
| Earthsave | Maureen Rogers | 340 | 0.8 | +0.8 |
| Independent | Victoria Harris-Ball | 309 | 0.8 | +0.8 |
| Independent | Steve Grim-Reaper | 238 | 0.6 | +0.6 |
| Independent | Wendy Broderick | 129 | 0.3 | +0.3 |
| Independent | Norman Hooper | 114 | 0.3 | +0.3 |
| Non-Custodial Parents | Judith Thompson | 108 | 0.3 | +0.3 |
| Total formal votes | | 40,336 | 97.0 | +1.6 |
| Informal votes | | 1,243 | 3.0 | −1.6 |
| Turnout | | 41,579 | 93.8 | |
Two-party-preferred result
| Labor | Faye Lo Po' | 23,235 | 66.7 | +12.4 |
| Liberal | Ross Fowler | 11,592 | 33.3 | −12.4 |
| Labor hold | | Swing | +12.4 | |

=== Pittwater ===
1999 New South Wales state election: Pittwater
| Party | Candidate | Votes | % | ±% |
|---|---|---|---|---|
| Liberal | John Brogden | 20,918 | 52.0 | −8.5 |
| Labor | Pat Boydell | 7,938 | 19.7 | −0.1 |
| Democrats | Vicki Dimond | 4,719 | 11.7 | +7.3 |
| Greens | Trevor Ockenden | 2,604 | 6.5 | −3.8 |
| One Nation | Peter Cuthbertson | 1,955 | 4.9 | +4.9 |
| Christian Democrats | Rick Bristow | 1,088 | 2.7 | −0.3 |
| AAFI | Paul Whitmore | 436 | 1.1 | +0.6 |
| Earthsave | Adrian Sonza | 414 | 1.0 | +1.0 |
| Non-Custodial Parents | Peter Vlug | 135 | 0.3 | +0.3 |
| Total formal votes | | 40,207 | 97.8 | +1.7 |
| Informal votes | | 897 | 2.2 | −1.7 |
| Turnout | | 41,104 | 92.1 | |
Two-party-preferred result
| Liberal | John Brogden | 23,201 | 68.8 | −1.5 |
| Labor | Pat Boydell | 10,523 | 31.2 | +1.5 |
| Liberal hold | | Swing | −1.5 | |

=== Port Jackson ===
1999 New South Wales state election: Port Jackson
| Party | Candidate | Votes | % | ±% |
|---|---|---|---|---|
| Labor | Sandra Nori | 21,582 | 53.9 | +0.9 |
| Liberal | Keri Huxley | 7,359 | 18.4 | 0.0 |
| Greens | Jenny Ryde | 3,159 | 7.9 | +7.5 |
| Democrats | Peter Furness | 2,993 | 7.5 | +4.2 |
| Independent | Jean Lennane | 2,944 | 7.3 | +7.3 |
| One Nation | Michael Vescio | 735 | 1.8 | +1.8 |
| Communist | Dennis Doherty | 549 | 1.4 | −2.6 |
| Democratic Socialist | Marina Carman | 310 | 0.8 | +0.8 |
| Gun Owners and Sporting Hunters Rights | Robert Loschiavo | 174 | 0.4 | +0.4 |
| People First | Ken Druery | 119 | 0.3 | +0.3 |
| Natural Law | Josh Burvill | 81 | 0.2 | +0.2 |
| Non-Custodial Parents | Jean-Marcel Malliate | 67 | 0.2 | +0.2 |
| Total formal votes | | 40,072 | 96.6 | +0.4 |
| Informal votes | | 1,390 | 3.4 | −0.4 |
| Turnout | | 41,462 | 89.4 | |
Two-party-preferred result
| Labor | Sandra Nori | 25,904 | 75.1 | +1.6 |
| Liberal | Keri Huxley | 8,567 | 24.9 | −1.6 |
| Labor hold | | Swing | +1.6 | |

=== Port Macquarie ===
1999 New South Wales state election: Port Macquarie
| Party | Candidate | Votes | % | ±% |
|---|---|---|---|---|
| National | Rob Oakeshott | 22,471 | 56.0 | +3.1 |
| Labor | Maureen Riordan | 10,815 | 27.0 | −2.8 |
| One Nation | Kim Sara | 4,832 | 12.1 | +12.1 |
| Greens | Lorraine Andersons | 1,219 | 3.0 | −2.1 |
| AAFI | Norm Dachs | 606 | 1.5 | +1.1 |
| Citizens Electoral Council | Graeme Muldoon | 151 | 0.4 | +0.4 |
| Total formal votes | | 40,094 | 98.4 | +2.2 |
| Informal votes | | 636 | 1.6 | −2.2 |
| Turnout | | 40,730 | 94.6 | |
Two-party-preferred result
| National | Rob Oakeshott | 23,919 | 66.6 | +4.6 |
| Labor | Maureen Riordan | 11,990 | 33.4 | −4.6 |
| National hold | | Swing | +4.6 | |

=== Port Stephens ===
1999 New South Wales state election: Port Stephens
| Party | Candidate | Votes | % | ±% |
|---|---|---|---|---|
| Labor | John Bartlett | 18,415 | 45.6 | −6.5 |
| National | Geoff Robinson | 9,650 | 23.9 | +23.9 |
| One Nation | Mark Conway | 5,247 | 13.0 | +13.0 |
| Greens | Glen Stevenson | 2,237 | 5.5 | −1.0 |
| Christian Democrats | Sally Dover | 1,930 | 4.8 | +0.9 |
| Democrats | Felicity Boyd | 1,345 | 3.3 | +0.4 |
| Independent | Maxina McCann | 1,073 | 2.7 | +2.7 |
| Citizens Electoral Council | Tony King | 449 | 1.1 | +1.1 |
| Total formal votes | | 40,346 | 97.7 | +3.5 |
| Informal votes | | 932 | 2.3 | −3.5 |
| Turnout | | 41,278 | 94.2 | |
Two-party-preferred result
| Labor | John Bartlett | 20,495 | 62.3 | +2.6 |
| National | Geoff Robinson | 12,421 | 37.7 | −2.6 |
| Labor hold | | Swing | +2.6 | |

=== Riverstone ===
1999 New South Wales state election: Riverstone
| Party | Candidate | Votes | % | ±% |
|---|---|---|---|---|
| Labor | John Aquilina | 23,148 | 54.9 | −0.3 |
| Liberal | Joan McIntyre | 10,779 | 25.6 | −9.5 |
| One Nation | Tony Pettitt | 3,964 | 9.4 | +9.4 |
| Democrats | Thomas Peacock | 1,908 | 4.5 | −1.7 |
| Greens | Cedric Hawkins | 1,522 | 3.6 | +3.6 |
| AAFI | John King | 838 | 2.0 | +2.0 |
| Total formal votes | | 42,159 | 97.2 | +2.9 |
| Informal votes | | 1,216 | 2.8 | −2.9 |
| Turnout | | 43,375 | 94.0 | |
Two-party-preferred result
| Labor | John Aquilina | 25,188 | 67.2 | +7.2 |
| Liberal | Joan McIntyre | 12,316 | 32.8 | −7.2 |
| Labor hold | | Swing | +7.2 | |

=== Rockdale ===
1999 New South Wales state election: Rockdale
| Party | Candidate | Votes | % | ±% |
|---|---|---|---|---|
| Labor | George Thompson | 22,258 | 55.9 | +2.9 |
| Liberal | Phillip Kaloudis | 11,003 | 27.6 | −11.4 |
| One Nation | Michael Citton | 2,185 | 5.5 | +5.5 |
| Greens | Nola Taylor | 1,191 | 3.0 | +3.0 |
| Democrats | Craig Chung | 1,087 | 2.7 | −1.9 |
| Independent | Peter Johnson | 818 | 2.1 | +2.1 |
| Independent | Joanne Jones | 651 | 1.6 | +1.6 |
| AAFI | Ian Gelling | 339 | 0.9 | +0.9 |
| Independent | William Ryan | 172 | 0.4 | +0.4 |
| Non-Custodial Parents | Pino Cardillo | 128 | 0.3 | +0.3 |
| Total formal votes | | 39,832 | 96.1 | +2.6 |
| Informal votes | | 1,629 | 3.9 | −2.6 |
| Turnout | | 41,461 | 92.5 | |
Two-party-preferred result
| Labor | George Thompson | 23,930 | 66.5 | +8.7 |
| Liberal | Phillip Kaloudis | 12,042 | 33.5 | −8.7 |
| Labor hold | | Swing | +8.7 | |

=== Ryde ===
1999 New South Wales state election: Ryde
| Party | Candidate | Votes | % | ±% |
|---|---|---|---|---|
| Labor | John Watkins | 18,169 | 44.1 | +7.4 |
| Liberal | Michael Photios | 13,853 | 33.6 | −13.2 |
| Independent | Ivan Petch | 3,494 | 8.5 | +8.5 |
| Democrats | Noel Plumb | 1,551 | 3.8 | −2.1 |
| Unity | Ning Gao | 1,260 | 3.1 | +3.1 |
| Greens | Jimmy Shaw | 1,098 | 2.7 | +1.2 |
| One Nation | Gordon King | 1,023 | 2.5 | +2.5 |
| AAFI | Fiona Paton | 276 | 0.7 | −1.6 |
| Outdoor Recreation | Jennifer Mathews | 232 | 0.6 | +0.6 |
| Independent | Iris Knight | 184 | 0.4 | −1.1 |
| People First | Rod Salmon | 80 | 0.2 | +0.2 |
| Total formal votes | | 41,220 | 97.3 | +2.0 |
| Informal votes | | 1,151 | 2.7 | −2.0 |
| Turnout | | 42,371 | 93.4 | |
Two-party-preferred result
| Labor | John Watkins | 20,813 | 56.6 | +10.8 |
| Liberal | Michael Photios | 15,961 | 43.4 | −10.8 |
| Labor notional gain from Liberal | | Swing | +10.8 | |

=== Smithfield ===
1999 New South Wales state election: Smithfield
| Party | Candidate | Votes | % | ±% |
|---|---|---|---|---|
| Labor | Carl Scully | 25,276 | 62.3 | +2.6 |
| Liberal | Bob Robertson | 8,924 | 22.0 | −11.0 |
| One Nation | Warren Dutton | 2,352 | 5.8 | +5.8 |
| Christian Democrats | Lewis Haroon | 1,341 | 3.3 | +3.2 |
| Greens | Vlaudin Vega | 1,265 | 3.1 | +3.1 |
| Democrats | Manny Poularas | 956 | 2.4 | −4.2 |
| AAFI | Earnest Nelson | 430 | 1.1 | +1.1 |
| Total formal votes | | 40,544 | 96.5 | +4.8 |
| Informal votes | | 1,483 | 3.5 | −4.8 |
| Turnout | | 42,027 | 93.5 | |
Two-party-preferred result
| Labor | Carl Scully | 26,525 | 72.8 | +9.3 |
| Liberal | Bob Robertson | 9,916 | 27.2 | −9.3 |
| Labor hold | | Swing | +9.3 | |

=== South Coast ===
1999 New South Wales state election: South Coast
| Party | Candidate | Votes | % | ±% |
|---|---|---|---|---|
| Labor | Wayne Smith | 16,543 | 40.2 | +10.1 |
| Liberal | Eric Ellis | 16,425 | 39.9 | −3.9 |
| One Nation | Melinda Warn | 4,274 | 10.4 | +10.4 |
| Greens | Jane Bange | 2,086 | 5.1 | −0.1 |
| Christian Democrats | Steve Ryan | 1,378 | 3.3 | +0.9 |
| AAFI | Chris Bowen | 479 | 1.2 | +1.2 |
| Total formal votes | | 41,185 | 98.2 | +2.4 |
| Informal votes | | 757 | 1.8 | −2.4 |
| Turnout | | 41,942 | 93.7 | |
Two-party-preferred result
| Labor | Wayne Smith | 18,651 | 50.5 | +5.1 |
| Liberal | Eric Ellis | 18,276 | 49.5 | −5.1 |
| Labor gain from Liberal | | Swing | +5.1 | |

=== Southern Highlands ===
1999 New South Wales state election: Southern Highlands
| Party | Candidate | Votes | % | ±% |
|---|---|---|---|---|
| Liberal | Peta Seaton | 17,614 | 44.4 | −9.8 |
| Labor | Noeline Brown | 13,527 | 34.1 | +4.5 |
| One Nation | Trevor Clarke | 4,055 | 10.2 | +10.2 |
| Greens | Jim Clark | 1,678 | 4.2 | −1.9 |
| Democrats | Greg Butler | 1,225 | 3.1 | −0.2 |
| Independent | Lynette Styles | 983 | 2.5 | +2.5 |
| AAFI | Philip Lavis | 464 | 1.2 | +1.2 |
| Non-Custodial Parents | Louise Taylor | 147 | 0.4 | +0.4 |
| Total formal votes | | 39,693 | 97.9 | +1.9 |
| Informal votes | | 833 | 2.1 | −1.9 |
| Turnout | | 40,526 | 93.9 | |
Two-party-preferred result
| Liberal | Peta Seaton | 19,209 | 55.7 | −5.9 |
| Labor | Noeline Brown | 15,289 | 44.3 | +5.9 |
| Liberal hold | | Swing | −5.9 | |

=== Strathfield ===
1999 New South Wales state election: Strathfield
| Party | Candidate | Votes | % | ±% |
|---|---|---|---|---|
| Labor | Paul Whelan | 18,386 | 44.8 | +4.9 |
| Liberal | Bruce MacCarthy | 13,623 | 33.2 | −14.9 |
| Unity | Omega Wu | 2,273 | 5.5 | +5.5 |
| Democrats | Anna Garrett | 1,800 | 4.4 | −0.6 |
| Greens | Mersina Soulos | 1,374 | 3.3 | +1.3 |
| One Nation | Anthony Zeitoun | 1,365 | 3.3 | +3.3 |
| Christian Democrats | Janne Peterson | 1,117 | 2.7 | +2.1 |
| Outdoor Recreation | Chris Angel | 460 | 1.1 | +1.1 |
| Voice of the People | Kwai Cheung | 248 | 0.6 | +0.6 |
| Democratic Socialist | Stephanie Roper | 207 | 0.5 | +0.5 |
| AAFI | John Divola | 204 | 0.5 | +0.5 |
| Total formal votes | | 41,057 | 97.0 | +2.4 |
| Informal votes | | 1,277 | 3.0 | −2.4 |
| Turnout | | 42,334 | 92.0 | |
Two-party-preferred result
| Labor | Paul Whelan | 21,387 | 58.4 | +11.2 |
| Liberal | Bruce MacCarthy | 15,225 | 41.6 | −11.2 |
| Labor gain from Liberal | | Swing | +11.2 | |

=== Swansea ===
1999 New South Wales state election: Swansea
| Party | Candidate | Votes | % | ±% |
|---|---|---|---|---|
| Labor | Milton Orkopoulos | 21,152 | 51.2 | −1.5 |
| Liberal | Jane Wiltshire | 9,712 | 23.5 | −6.7 |
| One Nation | Ronald Gardnir | 5,469 | 13.2 | +13.2 |
| Greens | Deb Gorgievski | 2,038 | 4.9 | +4.9 |
| Democrats | Michelle Walls | 1,671 | 4.0 | +4.0 |
| Christian Democrats | Guy Wood | 1,300 | 3.1 | +3.1 |
| Total formal votes | | 41,342 | 97.8 | +2.6 |
| Informal votes | | 922 | 2.2 | −2.6 |
| Turnout | | 42,264 | 95.1 | |
Two-party-preferred result
| Labor | Milton Orkopoulos | 23,507 | 66.6 | +5.9 |
| Liberal | Jane Wiltshire | 11,803 | 33.4 | −5.9 |
| Labor hold | | Swing | +5.9 | |

=== Tamworth ===
1999 New South Wales state election: Tamworth
| Party | Candidate | Votes | % | ±% |
|---|---|---|---|---|
| Independent | Tony Windsor | 28,182 | 69.4 | +2.0 |
| Labor | Siobhan Barry | 5,029 | 12.4 | −4.0 |
| National | John Cox | 4,701 | 11.6 | +0.9 |
| One Nation | Daphney Mandel-Hayes | 2,718 | 6.7 | +6.7 |
| Total formal votes | | 40,630 | 98.7 | +2.4 |
| Informal votes | | 520 | 1.3 | −2.4 |
| Turnout | | 41,150 | 94.4 | |
Notional two-party-preferred count
| National | John Cox | 13,867 | 54.8 | −27.4 |
| Labor | Siobhan Barry | 11,456 | 45.2 | +27.4 |
Two-candidate-preferred result
| Independent | Tony Windsor | 32,288 | 85.2 | +3.1 |
| Labor | Siobhan Barry | 5,597 | 14.8 | −3.1 |
| Independent hold | | Swing | +3.1 | |

=== The Entrance ===
1999 New South Wales state election: The Entrance
| Party | Candidate | Votes | % | ±% |
|---|---|---|---|---|
| Labor | Grant McBride | 19,526 | 47.3 | −0.3 |
| Liberal | Philip Walker | 11,404 | 27.6 | −13.0 |
| National | Bob Graham | 3,909 | 9.5 | +9.5 |
| One Nation | John Cantwell | 2,861 | 6.9 | +6.9 |
| Democrats | Sarah Browning | 1,167 | 2.8 | −0.8 |
| Greens | Rachel Alterator | 936 | 2.3 | +2.3 |
| Christian Democrats | Karen Russell | 880 | 2.1 | −1.0 |
| AAFI | Garry OAtes | 323 | 0.8 | −4.3 |
| Outdoor Recreation | Garth Coulter | 271 | 0.7 | +0.7 |
| Total formal votes | | 41,277 | 97.8 | +1.9 |
| Informal votes | | 936 | 2.2 | −1.9 |
| Turnout | | 42,213 | 94.1 | |
Two-party-preferred result
| Labor | Grant McBride | 21,292 | 59.7 | +5.7 |
| Liberal | Philip Walker | 14,365 | 40.3 | −5.7 |
| Labor hold | | Swing | +5.7 | |

=== The Hills ===
1999 New South Wales state election: The Hills
| Party | Candidate | Votes | % | ±% |
|---|---|---|---|---|
| Liberal | Michael Richardson | 21,954 | 51.1 | −17.7 |
| Labor | George Houssos | 10,876 | 25.3 | +4.5 |
| Democrats | Helen McAuliffe | 2,963 | 6.9 | +0.5 |
| Christian Democrats | Ken Gregory | 2,262 | 5.3 | +5.3 |
| Unity | Stephanie Chan | 1,734 | 4.0 | +4.0 |
| One Nation | Anthony Fitzpatrick | 1,606 | 3.7 | +3.7 |
| Greens | Claudine Chung | 1,178 | 2.7 | +2.7 |
| AAFI | Shaar Baker | 423 | 1.0 | +0.4 |
| Total formal votes | | 42,996 | 97.8 | +1.6 |
| Informal votes | | 974 | 2.2 | −1.6 |
| Turnout | | 43,970 | 93.0 | |
Two-party-preferred result
| Liberal | Michael Richardson | 24,352 | 64.7 | −10.0 |
| Labor | George Houssos | 13,300 | 35.3 | +10.0 |
| Liberal hold | | Swing | −10.0 | |

=== Tweed ===
1999 New South Wales state election: Tweed
| Party | Candidate | Votes | % | ±% |
|---|---|---|---|---|
| Labor | Neville Newell | 17,713 | 44.2 | +16.4 |
| National | Don Beck | 16,315 | 40.7 | −0.6 |
| Independent | John Penhaligon | 2,584 | 6.4 | +6.4 |
| Greens | Tom Tabart | 2,013 | 5.0 | +0.7 |
| Democrats | Troy Henderson | 945 | 2.4 | +2.4 |
| Earthsave | Tony Hollis | 535 | 1.3 | +1.3 |
| Total formal votes | | 40,105 | 98.0 | +2.0 |
| Informal votes | | 834 | 2.0 | −2.0 |
| Turnout | | 40,939 | 91.4 | |
Two-party-preferred result
| Labor | Neville Newell | 19,402 | 52.6 | +4.8 |
| National | Don Beck | 17,500 | 47.4 | −4.8 |
| Labor notional gain from National | | Swing | +4.8 | |

=== Upper Hunter ===
1999 New South Wales state election: Upper Hunter
| Party | Candidate | Votes | % | ±% |
|---|---|---|---|---|
| National | George Souris | 19,307 | 49.2 | −16.4 |
| Labor | Chris Connor | 12,450 | 31.7 | +0.8 |
| One Nation | Barrie Lawn | 5,030 | 12.8 | +12.8 |
| Greens | Neil Strachan | 1,195 | 3.0 | +3.0 |
| Citizens Electoral Council | George Easey | 670 | 1.7 | +1.7 |
| Christian Democrats | Derrick Paxton | 626 | 1.6 | +1.1 |
| Total formal votes | | 39,278 | 98.1 | +4.8 |
| Informal votes | | 756 | 1.9 | −4.8 |
| Turnout | | 40,034 | 94.9 | |
Two-party-preferred result
| National | George Souris | 21,250 | 60.5 | −8.1 |
| Labor | Chris Connor | 13,880 | 39.5 | +8.1 |
| National hold | | Swing | −8.1 | |

=== Vaucluse ===
1999 New South Wales state election: Vaucluse
| Party | Candidate | Votes | % | ±% |
|---|---|---|---|---|
| Liberal | Peter Debnam | 20,271 | 53.8 | −6.9 |
| Labor | David Patch | 10,244 | 27.2 | +4.6 |
| Greens | Haete Weiner | 3,797 | 10.1 | +1.0 |
| Democrats | Margaret Collings | 2,269 | 6.0 | +2.8 |
| One Nation | Waverney Ford | 791 | 2.1 | +2.1 |
| Euthanasia Referendum | Gregor Zylber | 305 | 0.8 | +0.8 |
| Total formal votes | | 37,677 | 97.8 | +1.6 |
| Informal votes | | 860 | 2.2 | −1.6 |
| Turnout | | 38,537 | 88.3 | |
Two-party-preferred result
| Liberal | Peter Debnam | 21,486 | 62.5 | −5.0 |
| Labor | David Patch | 12,903 | 37.5 | +5.0 |
| Liberal hold | | Swing | −5.0 | |

=== Wagga Wagga ===
1999 New South Wales state election: Wagga Wagga
| Party | Candidate | Votes | % | ±% |
|---|---|---|---|---|
| Labor | Col McPherson | 10,391 | 26.3 | −6.8 |
| Liberal | Daryl Maguire | 10,032 | 25.4 | −29.7 |
| National | Jim Booth | 9,052 | 22.9 | +19.7 |
| Independent | Peter Dale | 4,214 | 10.7 | +10.7 |
| One Nation | Greg Jerrick | 3,147 | 8.0 | +8.0 |
| Independent | Leigh Campbell | 1,650 | 4.2 | +4.2 |
| Democrats | Rex Graham | 1,071 | 2.7 | +2.5 |
| Total formal votes | | 39,557 | 98.3 | +2.8 |
| Informal votes | | 695 | 1.7 | −2.8 |
| Turnout | | 40,252 | 93.4 | |
Two-party-preferred result
| Liberal | Daryl Maguire | 18,297 | 57.5 | −5.3 |
| Labor | Col McPherson | 13,500 | 42.5 | +5.3 |
| Liberal hold | | Swing | −5.3 | |

=== Wakehurst ===
1999 New South Wales state election: Wakehurst
| Party | Candidate | Votes | % | ±% |
|---|---|---|---|---|
| Liberal | Brad Hazzard | 19,278 | 48.4 | −7.3 |
| Labor | Cherie Stokes | 11,455 | 28.8 | +1.3 |
| One Nation | Ian Nelson | 2,684 | 6.7 | +6.7 |
| Greens | Barbara Hatten | 2,644 | 6.6 | +5.1 |
| Democrats | Gabrielle Russell | 2,583 | 6.5 | +1.0 |
| AAFI | Alexander Hampel | 1,172 | 2.9 | −4.0 |
| Total formal votes | | 39,816 | 97.0 | +1.6 |
| Informal votes | | 1,219 | 3.0 | −1.6 |
| Turnout | | 41,035 | 93.0 | |
Two-party-preferred result
| Liberal | Brad Hazzard | 21,225 | 60.8 | −4.1 |
| Labor | Cherie Stokes | 13,713 | 39.2 | +4.1 |
| Liberal hold | | Swing | −4.1 | |

=== Wallsend ===
1999 New South Wales state election: Wallsend
| Party | Candidate | Votes | % | ±% |
|---|---|---|---|---|
| Labor | John Mills | 24,424 | 57.5 | −5.3 |
| Liberal | Yvonne Piddington | 8,265 | 19.5 | −12.6 |
| One Nation | Colin Thompson | 4,878 | 11.5 | +11.5 |
| Greens | Rebecca Moroney | 2,920 | 6.9 | +1.7 |
| Christian Democrats | David Murray | 1,752 | 4.1 | +4.1 |
| Citizens Electoral Council | Mel Schroeder | 246 | 0.6 | +0.6 |
| Total formal votes | | 42,485 | 97.6 | +4.3 |
| Informal votes | | 1,061 | 2.4 | −4.3 |
| Turnout | | 43,546 | 95.2 | |
Two-party-preferred result
| Labor | John Mills | 26,380 | 72.6 | +6.2 |
| Liberal | Yvonne Piddington | 9,957 | 27.4 | −6.2 |
| Labor hold | | Swing | +6.2 | |

=== Wentworthville ===
1999 New South Wales state election: Wentworthville
| Party | Candidate | Votes | % | ±% |
|---|---|---|---|---|
| Labor | Pam Allan | 21,250 | 52.5 | +0.9 |
| Liberal | Rachel Merton | 11,071 | 27.3 | −9.0 |
| One Nation | John Hutchinson | 2,609 | 6.4 | +6.4 |
| Christian Democrats | Dee Jonsson | 1,819 | 4.5 | +0.5 |
| Democrats | Geoffrey Rutledge | 1,132 | 2.8 | +1.1 |
| Greens | Rebecca Filipczyk | 1,093 | 2.7 | +2.7 |
| Unity | See-Yung Chin | 972 | 2.4 | +2.4 |
| AAFI | Ken O'Leary | 534 | 1.3 | −2.3 |
| Total formal votes | | 40,480 | 96.8 | +2.6 |
| Informal votes | | 1,341 | 3.2 | −2.6 |
| Turnout | | 41,821 | 93.6 | |
Two-party-preferred result
| Labor | Pam Allan | 22,631 | 65.4 | +7.7 |
| Liberal | Rachel Merton | 11,969 | 34.6 | −7.7 |
| Labor notional hold | | Swing | +7.7 | |

=== Willoughby ===
1999 New South Wales state election: Willoughby
| Party | Candidate | Votes | % | ±% |
|---|---|---|---|---|
| Liberal | Peter Collins | 20,327 | 50.8 | −9.2 |
| Labor | Luke Brasch | 11,262 | 28.1 | +4.9 |
| Democrats | Bryan McGuire | 3,048 | 7.6 | −0.8 |
| Greens | Bronwyn Brown | 2,090 | 5.2 | +3.8 |
| Unity | Cheryl Wong | 1,816 | 4.5 | +4.5 |
| One Nation | Heinz Markuse | 895 | 2.2 | +2.2 |
| AAFI | Douglas McCallum | 321 | 0.8 | −3.6 |
| Earthsave | Jennifer Aukim | 277 | 0.7 | +0.7 |
| Total formal votes | | 40,036 | 97.7 | +2.3 |
| Informal votes | | 954 | 2.3 | −2.3 |
| Turnout | | 40,990 | 91.5 | |
Two-party-preferred result
| Liberal | Peter Collins | 21,891 | 61.1 | −7.7 |
| Labor | Luke Brasch | 13,965 | 38.9 | +7.7 |
| Liberal hold | | Swing | −7.7 | |

== See also ==
- Candidates of the 1999 New South Wales state election
- Members of the New South Wales Legislative Assembly, 1999–2003

1999 New South Wales state election: Wollongong
| Party | Candidate | Votes | % | ±% |
|---|---|---|---|---|
| Labor | Col Markham | 24,713 | 62.7 | +3.4 |
| Liberal | Wade McInerney | 6,153 | 15.6 | −8.7 |
| Greens | Garth Dickenson | 2,557 | 6.5 | −3.4 |
