= Electoral results for the district of Southern Highlands =

Election results for Southern Highlands, New South Wales, Australia

Southern Highlands, an electoral district of the Legislative Assembly in the Australian state of New South Wales, was established in 1988. It was abolished in 2007 and largely replaced by Goulburn.

Election	Member	Party
1988	John Fahey	Liberal
1991	John Fahey	Liberal
1995	John Fahey	Liberal
1996	Peta Seaton	Liberal
1999	Peta Seaton	Liberal
2003	Peta Seaton	Liberal

== Election results ==
=== 2003 ===
2003 New South Wales state election: Southern Highlands
Party	Candidate	Votes	%	±%
Liberal	Peta Seaton	22,729	52.4	+8.0
Labor	Noeline Brown	15,280	35.2	+1.1
Greens	Jim Clark	3,726	8.6	+4.4
One Nation	Nathan McDonald	1,128	2.6	−7.6
Independent	Jean McClung	542	1.2	+1.2
Total formal votes		43,405	97.9	+0.0
Informal votes		931	2.1	−0.0
Turnout		44,336	93.6	
Two-party-preferred result
Liberal	Peta Seaton	23,789	57.6	+1.9
Labor	Noeline Brown	17,488	42.4	−1.9
Liberal hold		Swing	+1.9	

=== Elections in the 1990s ===
==== 1999 ====
1999 New South Wales state election: Southern Highlands
Party	Candidate	Votes	%	±%
Liberal	Peta Seaton	17,614	44.4	−9.8
Labor	Noeline Brown	13,527	34.1	+4.5
One Nation	Trevor Clarke	4,055	10.2	+10.2
Greens	Jim Clark	1,678	4.2	−1.9
Democrats	Greg Butler	1,225	3.1	−0.2
Independent	Lynette Styles	983	2.5	+2.5
Against Further Immigration	Philip Lavis	464	1.2	+1.2
Non-Custodial Parents	Louise Taylor	147	0.4	+0.4
Total formal votes		39,693	97.9	+1.9
Informal votes		833	2.1	−1.9
Turnout		40,526	93.9	
Two-party-preferred result
Liberal	Peta Seaton	19,209	55.7	−5.9
Labor	Noeline Brown	15,289	44.3	+5.9
Liberal hold		Swing	−5.9	

==== 1996 by-election ====
1996 Southern Highlands by-election Saturday 25 May
Party	Candidate	Votes	%	±%
National	Katrina Hodgkinson	11,530	32.60	+32.60
Liberal	Peta Seaton	10,565	29.87	−24.69
Labor	Philip Yeo	8,862	25.06	−7.48
Democrats	Greg Butler	2,155	6.09	+1.54
Independent	Malcolm Duncan	1,493	4.22	+4.22
Call to Australia	Charles Chappell	763	2.16	+0.53
Total formal votes		35,368	98.03	+1.81
Informal votes		712	1.97	−1.81
Turnout		36,080	89.43	−5.85
Two-candidate-preferred result
Liberal	Peta Seaton	19,933	52.37	−8.00
National	Katrina Hodgkinson	15,400	47.63	+47.63
Liberal hold		Swing	−8.00	

John Fahey (Liberal) resigned to successfully contest the federal electorate of Macarthur.

==== 1995 ====
1995 New South Wales state election: Southern Highlands
Party	Candidate	Votes	%	±%
Liberal	John Fahey	19,421	54.6	+6.5
Labor	Ken Sullivan	11,584	32.5	−5.1
Greens	Kevin Watchirs	2,014	5.7	+5.7
Democrats	Greg Butler	1,619	4.5	−4.8
Call to Australia	Peter Simos	956	2.7	−2.3
Total formal votes		35,594	96.2	+4.4
Informal votes		1,400	3.8	−4.4
Turnout		36,994	95.3	
Two-party-preferred result
Liberal	John Fahey	20,886	60.4	+3.9
Labor	Ken Sullivan	13,711	39.6	−3.9
Liberal hold		Swing	+3.9	

==== 1991 ====
1991 New South Wales state election: Southern Highlands
Party	Candidate	Votes	%	±%
Liberal	John Fahey	15,000	48.1	+20.1
Labor	Ken Sullivan	11,740	37.6	+9.6
Democrats	Susan Nagy	2,919	9.4	+5.7
Call to Australia	Wal Tennikoff	1,547	5.0	+5.0
Total formal votes		31,206	91.8	−5.5
Informal votes		2,784	8.2	+5.5
Turnout		33,990	93.7	
Two-party-preferred result
Liberal	John Fahey	16,859	56.4	−10.5
Labor	Ken Sullivan	13,009	43.6	+10.5
Liberal hold		Swing	−10.5	

=== Elections in the 1980s ===
==== 1988 ====
1988 New South Wales state election: Southern Highlands
Party	Candidate	Votes	%	±%
Liberal	John Fahey	15,176	51.2	+9.1
Labor	Nigel Watkins	7,110	24.0	−17.6
Independent	Thomas Gair	5,448	18.4	+18.4
Democrats	Gregory Butler	1,899	6.4	+6.4
Total formal votes		29,633	97.0	−1.0
Informal votes		905	3.0	+1.0
Turnout		30,538	94.5	
Two-party-preferred result
Liberal	John Fahey	18,451	66.8	+9.1
Labor	Nigel Watkins	9,171	33.2	−9.1
Liberal notional hold		Swing	+9.1	
