= 1996 Southern Highlands state by-election =

Election result for Southern Highlands, New South Wales, Australia

A by-election was held for the New South Wales Legislative Assembly electorate of Southern Highlands on 25 May 1996. The by-election was triggered by the resignation of the sitting member, former Premier of New South Wales John Fahey (Liberal), who vacated the seat to contest the federal electorate of Macarthur at the 1996 Australian federal election.

On the same day, by-elections were held in the seats of Clarence, Orange, Pittwater and Strathfield.

Four of the five recontested seats were retained by the Liberal–National Coalition, with the exception of Clarence. In Southern Highlands, there was three-cornered-contest between coalition partners, the Liberal and National parties. Despite the Nationals candidate polling the highest number of first preference votes, the Liberal Party retained the seat with a swing of 8.00% against them on a two-candidate-preferred basis.

== Results ==
1996 Southern Highlands by-election Saturday 25 May
Party	Candidate	Votes	%	±%
National	Katrina Hodgkinson	11,530	32.60	+32.60
Liberal	Peta Seaton	10,565	29.87	−24.69
Labor	Philip Yeo	8,862	25.06	−7.48
Democrats	Greg Butler	2,155	6.09	+1.54
Independent	Malcolm Duncan	1,493	4.22	+4.22
Call to Australia	Charles Chappell	763	2.16	+0.53
Total formal votes		35,368	98.03	+1.81
Informal votes		712	1.97	−1.81
Turnout		36,080	89.43	−5.85
Two-candidate-preferred result
Liberal	Peta Seaton	19,933	52.37	−8.00
National	Katrina Hodgkinson	15,400	47.63	+47.63
Liberal hold		Swing	−8.00	

== See also ==
- Electoral results for the district of Southern Highlands
- List of New South Wales state by-elections
