= Peter Phelps (politician) =

Australian politician

Dr Peter Phelps

Member of the New South Wales Legislative Council
- In office 26 March 2011 – 23 March 2019

Personal details
- Born: 7 May 1968 (age 58) Camden, New South Wales
- Party: Liberal Party

Peter Robert Phelps (born 7 May 1968) is an Australian politician. He was a Liberal Party member of the New South Wales Legislative Council from 2011 to 2019.

He was Government whip in the Legislative Council for five years, before resigning in March 2016 to protest new legislation regarding the sale of E10 ethanol fuel, which he called "an egregious breach" of Liberal Party core values.

== Early life ==
Phelps was born at Camden District Hospital to Robert and Gwen Phelps. He spent his early years in Bradbury, New South Wales, and attending the Bradbury Infants School. Later his family moved to the Sydney inner-western suburbs of Camperdown and then Dulwich Hill. He attended Camperdown Demonstration School, opportunity classes at Summer Hill Public School, Fort Street High School and the University of Sydney, where he resided at St Paul's College. He graduated with a Bachelor of Arts with Honours in History in 1990 and a PhD in Australian History in 1997.

== Political activity ==
Phelps contested the New South Wales Legislative Assembly seat of Drummoyne in the 1999 election. Before entering Parliament, Phelps worked as an adviser to various Liberal politicians: Ian McLachlan (1998), John Moore (1998–99), Senator Chris Ellison (1999–2000), Senator Eric Abetz (2001–06), Gary Nairn (2006–07), Senator Michael Ronaldson (2009–10) and Bronwyn Bishop (2010–11). He was ninth on the coalition Legislative Council ticket at the 2011 election and was elected 16th. He was again ninth on the coalition Legislative Council ticket at the 2019 election however he was not re-elected.

He was a Member of the State Executive of the Liberal Party and the Chairman of the Constitution Standing Committee. He has also been on numerous other parliamentary committees.

Phelps's entry at the website of the NSW Parliament says: "Dr Phelps is a libertarian with social conservative tendencies, placing him within the 'fusionist' school of conservative political philosophy. His political hero is Ronald Reagan."

== Controversies ==
Phelps was Nairn's chief of staff during the 2007 federal election, at which Nairn lost his seat of Eden-Monaro to the Labor candidate, Dr Mike Kelly. During the campaign he attended a Kelly campaign meeting in Queanbeyan. From the audience he asked Kelly, a former Army officer, why he had served in the Iraq War when Labor had opposed that war. Kelly replied "I was a soldier, and I did what I was ordered to do." Phelps then said: "Oh, like the guards at Belsen, perhaps? Are you using the Nuremberg Defence?"

The following week in federal Parliament, responding to a Labor question about Phelps's comments, Nairn said: "I would not agree with any comments that might compare the work of Australian soldiers with those in Nazi Germany." The ABC reported that "Peter Phelps has written to Mike Kelly, unreservedly withdrawing his inappropriate comments and regretting any offence."

In 2011, Phelps made a speech in which he compared scientists who believe in global warming to those who worked for totalitarian regimes. He said it should not be forgotten that "some of the strongest supporters of totalitarian regimes in the last century have been scientists... We should not be so surprised that the contemporary science debate has become so debased," he said. "At the heart of many scientists – but not all scientists – lies the heart of a totalitarian planner." This was reported as "Upper house whip under fire for Nazi slur on scientists," although Phelps did not use the word "Nazi."

In 2013, on the 40th anniversary of the military coup in Chile, Phelps, in a speech in the NSW Parliament, said that he supported the overthrow of Salvador Allende. Phelps' comments were controversial, with the Labor Party and Greens calling for Premier Barry O'Farrell to reprimand or sack Phelps for his comments. He was neither sacked nor reprimanded.
