= 2002 Hornsby state by-election =

A by-election was held for the New South Wales Legislative Assembly electorate of Hornsby on 23 February 2002 because Stephen O'Doherty (Liberal) resigned.

== Dates ==
Date	Event
22 January 2002	Resignation of Stephen O'Doherty.
4 February 2002	Writ of election issued by the Speaker of the Legislative Assembly and close of electoral rolls.
7 February 2002	Nominations
23 February 2002	Polling day
8 March 2002	Return of writ

== Results ==
2002 Hornsby by-election Saturday 23 February
Party	Candidate	Votes	%	±%
Liberal	Judy Hopwood	18,206	48.12	−4.57
Independent	John Muirhead	6,634	17.54	
Greens	Tony Mohr	4,975	13.15	+9.39
Independent	Mick Gallagher	4,675	12.36	+7.8
Democrats	Joanna Wong	2,296	6.07	+1.2
Christian Democrats	Owen Nannelli	1,045	2.76	
Total formal votes		37,831	97.73	+0.05
Informal votes		878	2.27	−0.05
Turnout		39,188	85.51	−7.41
Two-candidate-preferred result
Liberal	Judy Hopwood	20,096	60.16	
Independent	John Muirhead	13,309	39.84	
Liberal hold		Swing	+7.46 (Note: compared to the two-party-preferred result for the 1999 Hornsby election.)	

Stephen O'Doherty (Liberal) resigned.

== See also ==
- Electoral results for the district of Hornsby
- List of New South Wales state by-elections
