= List of Australian Catholic University people =

This is an list of Australian Catholic University people, including alumni and staff.

== Alumni ==
Notable alumni of the Australian Catholic University and its predecessor colleges include:

- James Ajaka, former CEO, Nudie Juice
- Camille Agnes Becker Paul, feminist, moral theologian and activist
- Matt Burke, Australian rugby union player
- Martin Dixon, former Victorian Minister for Education
- Pippa Hallas, CEO of Ella Baché
- Des Hasler, former professional rugby league footballer and coach of Canterbury-Bankstown Bulldogs
- James Tedesco, NRL Fullback for the Sydney Roosters
- Justin Madden, former AFL player; Victorian state minister
- Peter Maher, CEO of St Vincent de Paul Queensland
- Melina Marchetta, bestselling author of Looking for Alibrandi
- Morris West, writer
- Alan Whiticker, published author and rugby league historian
- Meg Lanning, Australian cricketer who plays for and captains the national team as well as the Melbourne Stars and the Victoria women's cricket team

== Faculty ==
- Frank Brennan, SJ, AO, professor of law, Institute of Legal Studies; Living National Treasure

== Administration ==
=== List of chancellors ===
Order	Chancellor	Term start	Term end	Time in office	Notes
1	Cardinal Edward Clancy AC, DD, LSS	1 January 1991	31 October 2000	9 years, 10 months, 6 days	
2	Julian McDonald CFC, AO	1 November 2000	27 November 2010	10 years, 26 days	
3	General Peter Cosgrove AC, MC	28 November 2010	28 January 2014	3 years, 61 days	
Acting	Edward "Ted" Exell AO	29 January 2014	3 September 2014	217 days	
4	John Fahey AC	4 September 2014	12 September 2020	6 years, 8 days	
Acting	Julien O'Connell AO	13 September 2020	31 December 2021	6 years, 65 days	
5	Martin Daubney AM KC	1 January 2022	Incumbent	4 years, 319 days	

=== List of Pro-Chancellors ===
Order	Pro-Chancellor	Term start	Term end	Time in office	Notes
1	Cardinal Pell	5 November 1990	4 November 1995	4 years, 11 months, 30 days	
2	Br. Robert Julian Mcdonald CFC, AO	5 October 1995	31 October 2001	6 years, 26 days	
3	Edward "Ted" Exell AO	1 November 2000	31 December 2015	15 years, 1 month, 30 days	
4	Julien O'Connell AO	1 January 2016	30 June 2022	6 years, 180 days	
5	Virginia Bourke	1 July 2022	Incumbent	4 years, 138 days	

=== List of vice-chancellors ===
Order	Vice-Chancellor	Term start	Term end	Time in office	Notes
1	Peter Drake	1 January 1991	31 January 1998	7 years, 30 days	
2	Peter Sheehan AO	1 February 1998	28 January 2008	9 years, 361 days	
3	Greg Craven	1 February 2008	10 January 2021	18 years, 288 days	
4	Zlatko Skrbis	11 January 2021	Incumbent	5 years, 309 days	
