= Judy Hopwood =

Australian politician

Member of the New South Wales Parliament for Hornsby
- In office 2002–2011
- Preceded by: Stephen O'Doherty
- Succeeded by: Matt Kean

Personal details
- Party: Liberal Party
- Children: 2 daughters
- Profession: Nurse

Judith Hopwood (born 19 June 1954), a former Australian politician, was a Member of the New South Wales Legislative Assembly representing Hornsby for Liberal Party between 2002 and 2011.

Hopwood was elected as Member for Hornsby following a by-election in 2002. During her time in politics, she was considered a moderate Liberal Party member. It was reported that the Liberal Right faction attempted to disendorse her in May 2006 during a purge of more moderate members. She survived this push due to local support and the support of then NSW Liberal leader Peter Debnam.

She is married with two daughters. Before politics, she was a nurse at a Sydney Hospital.

== Notes ==
New South Wales Legislative Assembly
Preceded by Stephen O'Doherty	Member for Hornsby; 2002–2011	Succeeded by Matt Kean
