= John Fahey (politician) =

Australian politician (1945–2020)

The Honourable John Fahey AC

38th Premier of New South Wales
- In office 24 June 1992 – 4 April 1995
- Monarch: Elizabeth II
- Governor: Peter Sinclair
- Deputy: Wal Murray (1992–93); Ian Armstrong (1993–95)
- Preceded by: Nick Greiner
- Succeeded by: Bob Carr

Minister for Finance
- In office 11 March 1996 – 26 November 2001
- Prime Minister: John Howard
- Preceded by: Kim Beazley
- Succeeded by: Nick Minchin

Member of the Australian Parliament for Macarthur
- In office 2 March 1996 – 8 October 2001
- Preceded by: Chris Haviland
- Succeeded by: Pat Farmer

Member of the New South Wales Legislative Assembly for Southern Highlands
- In office 19 March 1988 – 1 February 1996
- Preceded by: New district
- Succeeded by: Peta Seaton

Member of the New South Wales Legislative Assembly for Camden
- In office 24 March 1984 – 22 February 1988
- Preceded by: Ralph Brading
- Succeeded by: Peter Primrose

2nd President of WADA
- In office 1 January 2008 – 31 December 2013
- Preceded by: Dick Pound
- Succeeded by: Craig Reedie

Personal details
- Born: John Joseph Fahey; 10 January 1945 Wellington, New Zealand
- Died: 12 September 2020 (aged 75)
- Party: Liberal Party of Australia
- Spouse: Colleen Fahey
- Children: 3
- Occupation: Lawyer

John Joseph Fahey (10 January 1945 – 12 September 2020) was an Australian politician who served as the Premier of New South Wales from 1992 to 1995 and as the federal Minister for Finance from 1996 to 2001. He was a member of the New South Wales Legislative Assembly from 1984 to 1996 and the federal House of Representatives from 1996 to 2001. Fahey also served as president of the World Anti-Doping Agency and later became chancellor of the Australian Catholic University.

== Early life ==
Fahey was born in Wellington, New Zealand, the son of Stephen Fahey, a farmer, and his wife Annie Fahey of Galway, Ireland. In 1956, Fahey migrated with his family to Picton, New South Wales. He was educated at Chevalier College in Bowral and the University of Sydney. He married Colleen Maree McGurren in 1968, and they had two daughters and one son. He became a naturalised Australian in 1973. Fahey also played 37 lower grade matches for the Canterbury-Bankstown Bulldogs in the NSWRL.

== State politics ==
Fahey won the seat of electoral district of Camden for the Liberal Party in 1984. Fahey was elected member for Southern Highlands at the 1988 general election, and re-elected at the 1991 and 1995 state elections. During this period, Fahey was Minister for Industrial Relations from March 1988 and Minister for Further Education, Training and Employment from July 1990 in the Premier Nick Greiner led coalition government.

In June 1992, Fahey was appointed Premier of New South Wales after Greiner was forced to resign as a result of an Independent Commission Against Corruption of New South Wales investigation. Among those that Fahey defeated for the Liberal leadership in order to become premier was Bruce Baird, who was then elected as Fahey's Liberal deputy and whose son Mike would become premier in 2014.

On the day that he had replaced Greiner, Fahey described it as "the saddest day of his life".

In 1994, NSW Parliament was prorogued on 7 December when the Fahey government was attempting to stop a committee's work.

In March 1995, Fahey's government was narrowly defeated in a state election by the Labor opposition, led by Bob Carr.

Fahey is noted for having thwarted an assassination attempt on Charles, Prince of Wales. On Australia Day 1994, Prince Charles was about to commence handing out awards at a ceremony in Sydney's Darling Harbour when a former anthropology student, David Kang, lunged onto the stage towards the prince, simultaneously firing two shots from a starter's pistol. Fahey, sitting next to the prince, subsequently assisted by the then Australian of the Year, Ian Kiernan, tackled Kang and wrestled him to the ground, after which Kang was subdued and arrested. Although the attack proved less dangerous than it was first thought to be, Fahey was nonetheless widely praised for his unthinking bravery.

Fahey played a key role in the bidding process for the Sydney 2000 Olympic Games and is also noted for his reaction when Sydney won, jumping up and down enthusiastically.

== Federal politics ==
Fahey resigned from state politics just under a year after his state government was defeated at the polls and successfully sought endorsement for the Liberal Party, to serve in the federal House of Representatives in the seat of Macarthur. Fahey was elected at the 1996 federal election and served as Minister for Finance and Administration in the Howard government.

A redistribution in late 2000 radically altered Macarthur, cutting out most of the Southern Highlands and turning it into a notionally Labor seat centered on southwest Sydney. Believing this made Macarthur impossible to hold, Fahey sought to contest neighbouring Hume, which had absorbed much of his old Southern Highlands base. Hume was held by first-term MP Alby Schultz, a fellow Liberal who had also served in state parliament alongside Fahey. As a minister, Fahey was entitled to a seat under internal party convention. However, Schultz refused to hand Hume to Fahey, triggering a fight between the two. Prime Minister John Howard ordered an end to the feud.

Soon afterward, Fahey announced in May 2001 that he was retiring, citing family, personal and health reasons, after having one of his lungs removed in February due to cancer. He retired in October 2001, prior to the November 2001 election.

== Career after politics ==
Fahey became director of the Bradman Foundation when he left politics in 2001. On 17 October 2007, he was confirmed as the next president of the World Anti-Doping Agency, a position that he held until November 2013. In 2010, Fahey gave the 12th annual Tom Brock Lecture. Fahey was appointed as the fourth chancellor of the Australian Catholic University in Sydney for a five-year term from 4 September 2014. He was appointed to a second five-year term in May 2019, but died in September 2020.

== Personal life and death ==
A devout Roman Catholic, he was married to a former Anglican, Colleen, and stirred some controversy when he declared his opposition to both abortion and birth control.

John and Colleen Fahey's daughter, Tiffany, was killed in a road accident, at the age of 27, on 26 December 2006. John and Colleen Fahey became the legal guardians of Tiffany's children, Campbell and Amber. His son, the eldest of three children, is Matthew Fahey and his elder daughter is Melanie Fahey.

Fahey died on 12 September 2020 of leukaemia, having survived lung cancer in the early 2000s. He was 75 years old. The Government of New South Wales held a state funeral for the former premier on 25 September, officiated by Archbishop Anthony Fisher at St Mary's Cathedral, Sydney.

Leader of the Opposition Anthony Albanese, who had entered Federal Parliament in 1996 the same time as Fahey, expressed condolences in Parliament, saying that "John Joseph Fahey was a great bloke. That is the greatest thing you can say about an Australian male", and that given his background, Labor might have expected the young John Fahey to join their ranks, but that political differences never got in the way of his instinct to treat others with respect. Albanese's remark about Fahey joining Labor ranks was from a viewpoint formed by political observers that Fahey may have joined the wrong party (the Liberal Party) as his Irish Catholic upbringing made him more akin with the Labor Party with his parents having been ALP supporters including campaigning for Gough Whitlam in his election as Prime Minister.

== Honours ==
Fahey was appointed Companion of the Order of Australia in 2002 for service to the Australian and New South Wales Parliaments, particularly through landmark reform of industrial relations, facilitation of high technology and industry growth, and for raising the international profile of Australia as Chairman of the Bid for the Sydney 2000 Olympic Games.

Pope Francis made him a Knight Grand Cross of the Order of St Gregory the Great in 2019.

In 2016, Fahey was also awarded the Esprit du Chevalier Medal by his alma mater Chevalier College, that institution's highest public honour.

New South Wales Legislative Assembly
Preceded by Ralph Brading	Member for Camden; 1984–1988	Succeeded by Peter Primrose
New district	Member for Southern Highlands; 1988–1996	Succeeded by Peta Seaton
Political offices
Preceded by Pat Hills as Minister for Industrial Relations; Minister for Employment	Minister for Industrial Relations and Employment; 1988–1990	Succeeded by Himself as Minister for Industrial Relations; Minister for Further Education, Training and Employment
Preceded by Ray Aston	Minister for Corrective Services; 1988	Succeeded by Michael Yabsley
Preceded by Himself as Minister for Industrial Relations and Employment	Minister for Industrial Relations; 1990–1992	Succeeded by John Hannaford
Preceded by Himself as Minister for Industrial Relations and Employment	Minister for Further Education, Training and Employment; 1990–1992	Succeeded by Virginia Chadwick as Minister for Employment and Training
Preceded by Nick Greiner	Premier of New South Wales; 1992–1995	Succeeded by Bob Carr
Preceded by Nick Greiner	Treasurer of New South Wales; 1992–1993	Succeeded by Peter Collins
Preceded by Nick Greiner	Minister for Ethnic Affairs; 1992	Succeeded by George Souris
Preceded by Peter Collins as Minister for State Development	Minister for Economic Development; 1993–1995	Succeeded by Michael Egan as Minister for State Development
Party political offices
Preceded by Nick Greiner	Leader of the New South Wales Liberal Party; 1992–1995	Succeeded by Peter Collins
Parliament of Australia
Preceded by Chris Haviland	Member for Macarthur; 1996–2001	Succeeded by Pat Farmer
Political offices
Preceded by Kim Beazley	Minister for Finance and Administration; 1996–2001	Succeeded by Nick Minchin
Academic offices
Preceded by Ted Exell	Chancellor of Australian Catholic University; 2014–2020	Succeeded by Julien O’Connell (acting)
