= Electoral district of Southern Highlands =

Former state electoral district of New South Wales, Australia

Southern Highlands was an electoral district of the Legislative Assembly in the Australian state of New South Wales from 1988 to 2007, named after the Southern Highlands. It was replaced by a recreated Goulburn electorate.

== Members for Southern Highlands ==
Member	Party	Period
John Fahey	Liberal	1988–1996
Peta Seaton	Liberal	1996–2007

== Election results ==
2003 New South Wales state election: Southern Highlands
Party	Candidate	Votes	%	±%
Liberal	Peta Seaton	22,729	52.4	+8.0
Labor	Noeline Brown	15,280	35.2	+1.1
Greens	Jim Clark	3,726	8.6	+4.4
One Nation	Nathan McDonald	1,128	2.6	−7.6
Independent	Jean McClung	542	1.2	+1.2
Total formal votes		43,405	97.9	+0.0
Informal votes		931	2.1	−0.0
Turnout		44,336	93.6	
Two-party-preferred result
Liberal	Peta Seaton	23,789	57.6	+1.9
Labor	Noeline Brown	17,488	42.4	−1.9
Liberal hold		Swing	+1.9	
