= Peta Seaton =

Australian politician

Peta Seaton AM
- Born: 9 October 1959 (age 66); Port Moresby, Papua New Guinea
- Education: Bachelor of Arts in Archaeology (Hons), University of Sydney
- Occupations: Chair of the Board of Directory, Hearing Australia; President of the Council, Near Eastern Archaeology Foundation
- Known for: Former NSW MP and Shadow Frontbencher
- Term: 25 May 1996 - 2 May 2007
- Predecessor: John Fahey
- Political party: Liberal Party
- Board member of: Hearing Australia (Chair)
- Spouse: Lachlan Paterson
- Children: 1
- Honours: Member of the General Division of the Order of Australia

Peta Luise Seaton AM (born 9 October 1959) is an archaeologist and former New South Wales politician who was a member of the state's Legislative Assembly representing the Southern Highlands for the Liberal Party from 1996 until her retirement prior to the 2007 New South Wales elections.

Seaton was born in Port Moresby, Papua New Guinea and received education at Woodford School, Solomon Islands and Wenona School, North Sydney. She completed a Bachelor of Arts (Honours) in Archaeology at the University of Sydney in 1981 and acquired her PhD title in 2007.

Seaton worked a short stint in the television industry from 1983 to 1987. Since 2014, she has been the chair of the board of directors for Hearing Australia, Australia's governmental assisted hearing authority. She also has had a number of consulting roles for both the private and public sectors.

== Political career ==
Seaton was Press Secretary for the Leader of the Opposition in the New South Wales Legislative Council, Ted Pickering, from 1987 to 1988. She worked for Premier Nick Greiner from 1988 to 1992 and Premier John Fahey in 1992. She worked in Canberra as adviser and programme director for the Leader of the Federal Opposition, John Hewson from 1992 to 1993.

In 1996, Seaton won the seat of the Southern Highlands in a by-election replacing John Fahey. She was re-elected in 1999 and 2003, retiring prior to 2007 election.

Between 2009 and 2014, Seaton was the Director of Strategic Initiatives for Premier Barry O’Farrell.

New South Wales Legislative Assembly
Preceded by John Fahey	Member for Southern Highlands; 1996–2007	District abolished
