= Stephen O'Doherty =

Australian politician

Stephen Mark O'Doherty (born 26 October 1959) is an Australian former politician and former member of the Liberal Party.

== Early life and career ==
O'Doherty was born in Melbourne and raised in New South Wales. He attended Carlingford High School, a public school in the north-western suburbs of Sydney. He received a B.A. (Communication) from the New South Wales Institute of Technology

From 1981 until his election to Parliament, he was a broadcaster and journalist in radio and TV. During the 1980s he was the host of the Sundown Rundown current affairs program on Sydney's 2GB, and was a state and national affairs reporter with The 7.30 Report and Network Ten. He is a regular commentator on politics and the media on 702 ABC Sydney and Sky News Australia.

== Political career ==
In 1992, O'Doherty was elected as a member of the New South Wales Legislative Assembly for the seat of Ku-ring-gai. In 1999 he was re-elected to the seat of Hornsby following a redistribution of electoral boundaries. From 1995, he served as a front bencher in the Liberal Opposition under Peter Collins and Kerry Chikarovski, first in the portfolios of Education and Community Services, and then serving as Shadow Treasurer until his resignation in 2002.

== Post-politics ==
In January 2002, O'Doherty left Parliament to become the inaugural chief executive officer of Christian Schools Australia, a national association representing Christian schools. He held this post until the end of 2016, in order to pursue other media interests.

He currently is the chair of Hope Media, a not-for-profit Christian radio broadcaster. In March 2017, he returned to regular radio broadcasting on Hope Media's Hope 103.2 channel as host of its Open House current affairs program. He is also a regular contributor on the ABC.

== Musical career ==
"Music was said to be a constant thread for him “since his mid-twenties and through all of life,” alongside his faith and work in communication and leadership".

=== Early musical involvement ===
O’Doherty's first significant exposure to music was in his youth, where he became involved in school music activities, conducted ensembles and plays clarinet — experiences that helped shape his ongoing connection with music and performance.

=== Community music leadership ===
He has been deeply involved in community music for over four decades. O’Doherty has conducted various community concert bands since his teens and continues to do so — most notably as the musical director and principal conductor of the Golden Kangaroos Hornsby Concert Band in Sydney's north, a position he still holds. In this role he leads rehearsals and performances, helping nurture local amateur musicians and maintain community engagement in band music. His long tenure with the group reflects a sustained hands-on contribution to amateur music-making in the region.

=== Music advocacy and education support ===
O'Doherty's influence extends into music advocacy and education. He helped establish and lead collaborative efforts among instrumental, vocal and music education organisations — for instance, The Roundtable of Instrumental, Vocal and Music Education Organisations (RIVMEO), created during the COVID-19 pandemic to support music educators and preserve music education opportunities.

His advocacy reflects an interest not only in performance but also in ensuring music has a strong structural place in schools and community programs.

== Recognition ==
In 2024, O’Doherty was honored with the Medal of the Order of Australia (OAM), partly in recognition of his contributions to music through community band leadership and broader arts and education activities.

== Personal life ==
O'Doherty is married with two sons.

New South Wales Legislative Assembly
Preceded by Nick Greiner	Member for Ku-ring-gai; 1992–1999	Succeeded by Barry O'Farrell
Preceded by New seat	Member for Hornsby; 1999–2002	Succeeded by Judy Hopwood
