= Electoral results for the district of Macquarie Fields =

Australian district election results

Macquarie Fields, an electoral district of the Legislative Assembly in the Australian state of New South Wales, has had two incarnations, the first from 1988 to 1991, the second from 1999. It has always been held by the Labor party.

== Members ==
First incarnation (1988–1991)
Member	Party	Term
Stan Knowles	Labor	1988–1990
Craig Knowles	Labor	1990–1991
Second incarnation (1999–present)
Member	Party	Term
Craig Knowles	Labor	1999–2005
Steven Chaytor	Labor	2005–2007
Andrew McDonald	Labor	2007–2015
Anoulack Chanthivong	Labor	2015–present

== Election results ==
=== Elections in the 2020s ===
==== 2023 ====
2023 New South Wales state election: Macquarie Fields
Party	Candidate	Votes	%	±%
Labor	Anoulack Chanthivong	28,089	57.1	+3.7
Liberal	Khairul Chowdhury	10,682	21.7	−6.8
Liberal Democrats	Gemma Noiosi	4,122	8.4	+8.3
Greens	Seamus Lee	2,349	4.8	+0.6
Animal Justice	Donna Wilson	2,346	4.8	+4.5
Sustainable Australia	Michael Clark	1,606	3.3	+3.3
Total formal votes		49,194	95.6	+0.2
Informal votes		2,266	4.4	−0.2
Turnout		51,460	86.3	−0.3
Two-party-preferred result
Labor	Anoulack Chanthivong	30,468	69.9	+5.0
Liberal	Khairul Chowdhury	13,141	30.1	−5.0
Labor hold		Swing	+5.0	

=== Elections in the 2010s ===
==== 2019 ====
2019 New South Wales state election: Macquarie Fields
Party	Candidate	Votes	%	±%
Labor	Anoulack Chanthivong	27,942	52.93	+2.12
Liberal	Zahurul Quazi	15,057	28.52	−8.03
Independent	Mick Allen	3,361	6.37	+3.10
Keep Sydney Open	Scott Singh	2,403	4.55	+4.55
Greens	Stephen Eagar-Deitz	2,247	4.26	+0.47
Independent	Syed Ahmed	1,779	3.37	+3.37
Total formal votes		52,789	95.38	−0.37
Informal votes		2,558	4.62	+0.37
Turnout		55,347	89.58	−0.06
Two-party-preferred result
Labor	Anoulack Chanthivong	29,944	64.75	+6.66
Liberal	Zahurul Quazi	16,301	35.25	−6.66
Labor hold		Swing	+6.66	

==== 2015 ====
2015 New South Wales state election: Macquarie Fields
Party	Candidate	Votes	%	±%
Labor	Anoulack Chanthivong	23,978	50.8	+11.7
Liberal	Pat Farmer	17,247	36.5	−6.0
Greens	Mary Brownlee	1,787	3.8	−2.1
Independent	Mick Allen	1,543	3.3	+3.3
Christian Democrats	John Ramsay	1,484	3.1	−0.9
No Land Tax	Antonetta Marra	863	1.8	+1.8
	Clinton Mead	288	0.6	+0.6
Total formal votes		47,190	95.7	+0.8
Informal votes		2,096	4.3	−0.8
Turnout		49,286	89.6	+3.4
Two-party-preferred result
Labor	Anoulack Chanthivong	25,267	58.1	+9.9
Liberal	Pat Farmer	18,227	41.9	−9.9
Labor notional gain from Liberal		Swing	+9.9	

==== 2011 ====
2011 New South Wales state election: Macquarie Fields
Party	Candidate	Votes	%	±%
Labor	Andrew McDonald	18,157	40.1	−12.9
Liberal	Sam Eskaros	16,727	37.0	+3.9
Independent	Nola Fraser	4,738	10.5	+10.5
Christian Democrats	Joshua Green	2,647	5.8	+1.5
Greens	Bill Cashman	1,744	3.9	−1.2
Independent	Mick Allen	717	1.6	−0.1
Democratic Labor	Simon McCaffrey	531	1.2	+1.2
Total formal votes		45,261	95.1	−0.6
Informal votes		2,356	4.9	+0.6
Turnout		47,617	92.0	
Two-party-preferred result
Labor	Andrew McDonald	19,626	51.5	−9.7
Liberal	Sam Eskaros	18,510	48.5	+9.7
Labor hold		Swing	−9.7	

=== Elections in the 2000s ===
==== 2007 ====
2007 New South Wales state election: Macquarie Fields
Party	Candidate	Votes	%	±%
Labor	Andrew McDonald	21,918	53.0	−10.2
Liberal	Nola Fraser	13,678	33.1	+11.0
Greens	Peter Butler	2,092	5.1	+0.3
Christian Democrats	Hany Gayed	1,806	4.4	+1.2
AAFI	Frank Corrigan	1,160	2.8	+1.0
Independent	Mick Allen	703	1.7	+0.9
Total formal votes		41,357	95.7	−0.1
Informal votes		1,858	4.3	+0.1
Turnout		43,215	92.0	
Two-party-preferred result
Labor	Andrew McDonald	23,359	61.1	−12.2
Liberal	Nola Fraser	14,860	38.9	+12.2
Labor hold		Swing	−12.2	

==== 2005 by-election ====
2005 Macquarie Fields by-election Saturday 17 September
Party	Candidate	Votes	%	±%
Labor	Steven Chaytor	23,072	49.30	−13.31
Liberal	Nola Fraser	15,332	32.76	+9.88
Greens	Ben Raue	2,406	5.14	+0.58
Independent	Ken Barnard	2,218	4.74	+4.74
Christian Democrats	Denis Plant	1,568	3.35	+0.28
AAFI	Janey Woodger	1,135	2.43	+0.54
One Nation	Bob Vinnicombe	1,066	2.28	+0.24
Total formal votes		46,797	96.53	+0.18
Informal votes		1,684	3.47	−0.18
Turnout		48,481	84.77	−6.99
Two-party-preferred result
Labor	Steven Chaytor	25,535	60.13	−12.38
Liberal	Nola Fraser	16,934	39.87	+12.38
Labor hold		Swing	−12.38	

Craig Knowles (Labor) resigned.

==== 2003 ====
2003 New South Wales state election: Macquarie Fields
Party	Candidate	Votes	%	±%
Labor	Craig Knowles	30,036	62.6	+0.7
Liberal	Jai Rowell	10,974	22.9	+2.0
Greens	Peter Butler	2,187	4.6	+4.6
Christian Democrats	Jim Parkins	1,471	3.1	+3.1
One Nation	Rhonda McDonald	979	2.0	−7.0
AAFI	James Grindrod	909	1.9	−0.7
Democrats	William Body	503	1.0	−2.0
Independent	Mick Allen	476	1.0	−1.0
Unity	Kek Tai	438	0.9	+0.9
Total formal votes		47,973	96.4	−0.4
Informal votes		1,817	3.6	+0.4
Turnout		49,790	91.8	
Two-party-preferred result
Labor	Craig Knowles	31,394	72.5	−1.0
Liberal	Jai Rowell	11,903	27.5	+1.0
Labor hold		Swing	−1.0	

=== Elections in the 1990s ===
==== 1999 ====
1999 New South Wales state election: Macquarie Fields
Party	Candidate	Votes	%	±%
Labor	Craig Knowles	25,223	61.9	+5.2
Liberal	Jai Rowell	8,512	20.9	−11.3
One Nation	Stuart Horton	3,660	9.0	+9.0
Democrats	Emanuela Lang	1,226	3.0	+2.9
AAFI	Jane Field	1,044	2.6	−2.1
Independent	Mick Allen	824	2.0	+0.6
Non-Custodial Parents	Scott Thompson	252	0.6	+0.6
Total formal votes		40,741	96.8	+4.0
Informal votes		1,361	3.2	−4.0
Turnout		42,102	92.4	
Two-party-preferred result
Labor	Craig Knowles	26,705	73.5	+10.5
Liberal	Jai Rowell	9,620	26.5	−10.5
Labor notional hold		Swing	+10.5	

district re-created

==== 1991 – 1999 ====
District abolished district abolished

==== 1990 by-election ====
1990 Macquarie Fields by-election Saturday 3 November
Party	Candidate	Votes	%	±%
Labor	Craig Knowles	13,412	55.0	+9.6
Independent	Noel Short	7,543	30.9	+22.2
Democrats	Julian Connelly	3,450	14.1	+8.2
Total formal votes		24,405	95.9	
Informal votes		1,032	4.1	
Turnout		25,437	71.9	
Two-party-preferred result
Labor	Craig Knowles	14,134	60.4	+5.5
Independent	Noel Short	9,266	39.6	
Labor hold		Swing		

Stan Knowles (Labor) resigned.

=== Elections in the 1980s ===
==== 1988 ====
1988 New South Wales state election: Macquarie Fields
Party	Candidate	Votes	%	±%
Labor	Stan Knowles	13,248	45.4	−18.4
Liberal	Frank Calabro	10,248	35.1	−0.7
Independent	Leslie Short	2,548	8.7	+8.7
Democrats	Peter Stephens	1,748	6.0	+5.9
Independent	Peter Perkins	1,415	4.8	+4.8
Total formal votes		29,207	94.8	−1.5
Informal votes		1,596	5.2	+1.5
Turnout		30,803	91.2	
Two-party-preferred result
Labor	Stan Knowles	14,860	54.9	−9.1
Liberal	Frank Calabro	12,183	45.1	+9.1
Labor notional hold		Swing	−9.1	
