= Members of the New South Wales Legislative Assembly, 2003–2007 =

Members of the New South Wales Legislative Assembly who served in the 53rd parliament held their seats from 2003 to 2007. They were elected at the 2003 state election, and at by-elections. The Speaker was John Aquilina.

| Name | Party | Electorate | Term in office |
|---|---|---|---|
| Pam Allan | Labor | Wentworthville | 1988–2007 |
| Richard Amery | Labor | Mount Druitt | 1983–2015 |
| Marie Andrews | Labor | Peats | 1995–2011 |
| Greg Aplin | Liberal | Albury | 2003–2019 |
| John Aquilina | Labor | Riverstone | 1981–2011 |
| Ian Armstrong | National | Lachlan | 1981–2007 |
| Alan Ashton | Labor | East Hills | 1999–2011 |
| David Barr | Independent | Manly | 1999–2007 |
| John Bartlett | Labor | Port Stephens | 1999–2007 |
| Diane Beamer | Labor | Mulgoa | 1995–2011 |
| Gladys Berejiklian | Liberal | Willoughby | 2003–2021 |
| Peter Black | Labor | Murray-Darling | 1999–2007 |
| John Brogden (Note: Pittwater Liberal MLA and outgoing Opposition Leader John Brogden resigned on 28 September 2005. Independent candidate Alex McTaggart won the resulting by-election on 26 November.) | Liberal | Pittwater | 1996–2005 |
| Matt Brown | Labor | Kiama | 1999–2011 |
| Linda Burney | Labor | Canterbury | 2003–2016 |
| Cherie Burton | Labor | Kogarah | 1999–2015 |
| David Campbell | Labor | Keira | 1999–2011 |
| Steve Cansdell | National | Clarence | 2003–2011 |
| Bob Carr (Note: Maroubra Labor MLA and outgoing Premier Bob Carr resigned on 3 August 2005. Labor candidate Michael Daley won the resulting by-election on 17 September.) | Labor | Maroubra | 1983–2005 |
| Steven Chaytor (Note: Macquarie Fields Labor MLA Craig Knowles resigned on 10 August 2005. Labor candidate Steven Chaytor won the resulting by-election on 17 September.) (Note: Macquarie Fields MLA Steven Chaytor was expelled from the Labor Party on 19 January 2007 after being found guilty of domestic violence. He served out his term as an independent.) | Labor/Independent | Macquarie Fields | 2005–2007 |
| Barry Collier | Labor | Miranda | 1999–2011, 2013–2015 |
| Andrew Constance | Liberal | Bega | 2003–2021 |
| Geoff Corrigan | Labor | Camden | 2003–2011 |
| Paul Crittenden | Labor | Wyong | 1991–2007 |
| Angela D'Amore | Labor | Drummoyne | 2003–2011 |
| Michael Daley | Labor | Maroubra | 2005–present |
| Peter Debnam | Liberal | Vaucluse | 1994–2011 |
| Bob Debus | Labor | Blue Mountains | 1981–1988, 1995–2007 |
| Peter Draper | Independent | Tamworth | 2003–2011 |
| Dawn Fardell (Note: Dubbo independent MLA Tony McGrane died of liver cancer on 15 September 2004. Independent candidate Dawn Fardell won the resulting by-election on 20 November.) | Independent | Dubbo | 2004–2011 |
| Andrew Fraser | National | Coffs Harbour | 1990–2019 |
| Tanya Gadiel | Labor | Parramatta | 2003–2011 |
| Bryce Gaudry (Note: Newcastle MLA Bryce Gaudry resigned from the Labor Party on 29 January 2007 after losing preselection to recontest his seat. He served out the remainder of his term as an independent.) | Labor/Independent | Newcastle | 1991–2007 |
| Thomas George | National | Lismore | 1999–2019 |
| Paul Gibson | Labor | Blacktown | 1988–2011 |
| Kevin Greene | Labor | Georges River | 1999–2011 |
| Shelley Hancock | Liberal | South Coast | 2003–2023 |
| Chris Hartcher | Liberal | Gosford | 1988–2015 |
| Noreen Hay | Labor | Wollongong | 2003–2016 |
| Brad Hazzard | Liberal | Wakehurst | 1991–2023 |
| Kerry Hickey | Labor | Cessnock | 1999–2011 |
| Katrina Hodgkinson | National | Burrinjuck | 1999–2017 |
| Judy Hopwood | Liberal | Hornsby | 2002–2011 |
| Andrew Humpherson | Liberal | Davidson | 1992–2007 |
| Jeff Hunter | Labor | Lake Macquarie | 1991–2007 |
| Morris Iemma | Labor | Lakemba | 1991–2008 |
| Virginia Judge | Labor | Strathfield | 2003–2011 |
| Kristina Keneally | Labor | Heffron | 2003–2012 |
| Malcolm Kerr | Liberal | Cronulla | 1984–2011 |
| Craig Knowles | Labor | Macquarie Fields | 1990–2005 |
| Paul Lynch | Labor | Liverpool | 1995–2023 |
| Daryl Maguire | Liberal | Wagga Wagga | 1999–2018 |
| Gerard Martin | Labor | Bathurst | 1999–2011 |
| Grant McBride | Labor | The Entrance | 1992–2011 |
| Tony McGrane | Independent | Dubbo | 1999–2004 |
| Paul McLeay | Labor | Heathcote | 2003–2011 |
| Alex McTaggart | Independent | Pittwater | 2005–2007 |
| Reba Meagher | Labor | Cabramatta | 1994–2008 |
| Alison Megarrity | Labor | Menai | 1999–2011 |
| Wayne Merton | Liberal | Baulkham Hills | 1988–2011 |
| John Mills | Labor | Wallsend | 1988–2007 |
| Clover Moore | Independent | Bligh | 1988–2012 |
| Matthew Morris | Labor | Charlestown | 2003–2011 |
| Neville Newell | Labor | Tweed | 1999–2007 |
| Sandra Nori | Labor | Port Jackson | 1988–2007 |
| Barry O'Farrell | Liberal | Ku-ring-gai | 1995–2015 |
| Rob Oakeshott | Independent | Port Macquarie | 1996–2008 |
| Milton Orkopoulos (Note: Swansea MLA Milton Orkopoulos was expelled from the Labor Party on 8 November 2006 after being charged with child sex offences. He subsequently resigned from parliament on 13 November under threat of expulsion, but no by-election was held due to the proximity of the 2007 election.) | Labor/Independent | Swansea | 1999–2006 |
| Don Page | National | Ballina | 1988–2015 |
| Karyn Paluzzano | Labor | Penrith | 2003–2010 |
| Paul Pearce | Labor | Coogee | 2003–2011 |
| Barbara Perry | Labor | Auburn | 2001–2015 |
| Adrian Piccoli | National | Murrumbidgee | 1999–2017 |
| John Price | Labor | Maitland | 1984–2007 |
| Steven Pringle (Note: Hawkesbury MLA Steven Pringle resigned from the Liberal Party on 17 October 2006 after losing preselection to recontest his seat. He served out the remainder of his term as an independent.) | Liberal/Independent | Hawkesbury | 2003–2007 |
| Andrew Refshauge (Note: Marrickville Labor MLA and outgoing Deputy Premier Andrew Refshauge resigned on 10 August 2005. Labor candidate Carmel Tebbutt, the incumbent Minister for Education, won the resulting by-election on 17 September, successfully switching from the Legislative Council to the Legislative Assembly.) | Labor | Marrickville | 1983–2005 |
| Michael Richardson | Liberal | The Hills | 1993–2011 |
| Anthony Roberts | Liberal | Lane Cove | 2003–present |
| Marianne Saliba | Labor | Illawarra | 1999–2007 |
| Frank Sartor | Labor | Rockdale | 2003–2011 |
| Carl Scully | Labor | Smithfield | 1990–2005 |
| Peta Seaton | Liberal | Southern Highlands | 1996–2007 |
| Allan Shearan (Note: The incumbent Labor member for Londonderry, Jim Anderson, died on 22 March 2003, the day of the 2003 election. As he had been attempting to recontest his seat, there was no polling in the seat on election day. The resulting supplementary election was won by Labor candidate Allan Shearan on 31 May.) | Labor | Londonderry | 2003–2011 |
| Jillian Skinner | Liberal | North Shore | 1994–2017 |
| Ian Slack-Smith | National | Barwon | 1995–2007 |
| George Souris | National | Upper Hunter | 1988–2015 |
| Tony Stewart | Labor | Bankstown | 1995–2011 |
| Andrew Stoner | National | Oxley | 1999–2015 |
| Carmel Tebbutt | Labor | Marrickville | 2005–2015 |
| Andrew Tink | Liberal | Epping | 1988–2007 |
| Richard Torbay | Independent | Northern Tablelands | 1999–2013 |
| Joe Tripodi | Labor | Fairfield | 1995–2011 |
| John Turner | National | Myall Lakes | 1988–2011 |
| Russell Turner | National | Orange | 1996–2011 |
| John Watkins | Labor | Ryde | 1995–2008 |
| Graham West | Labor | Campbelltown | 2001–2011 |
| Steve Whan | Labor | Monaro | 2003–2011, 2023–present |
| Kim Yeadon | Labor | Granville | 1990–2007 |

== See also ==
- Fourth Carr Ministry
- First Iemma ministry
- Results of the 2003 New South Wales state election (Legislative Assembly)
- Candidates of the 2003 New South Wales state election
