= Results of the 2003 New South Wales Legislative Assembly election =

State election for New South Wales, Australia in March 2003

Party	Votes	%	+/–	Seats	+/–
Labor	1,631,018	42.68	▲0.47	55	Steady
Liberal	944,888	24.72	▼0.10	20	Steady
National	368,004	9.63	▲0.76	12	▼1
Greens	315,370	8.25	▲4.37	0	Steady
Independents	313,106	8.19	▲3.09	6	▲1
Christian Democrats	65,937	1.73	▲0.23	0	Steady
Unity	49,597	1.30	▲0.24	0	Steady
One Nation NSW	48,846	1.28	▼6.25	0	Steady
Democrats	35,477	0.93	▼2.40	0	Steady
Others	49,561	1.30	▼0.41	0	Steady
Total	3,821,804	100.00	–	93	–
Valid votes	3,821,804	97.38			
Invalid/blank votes	102,872	2.62	▲0.11		
Total votes	3,924,676	100.00	–		
Registered voters/turnout	4,272,104	91.87	▼1.25		
Source: NSW Elections - 2003 Results
Two-party-preferred
Labor	1,867,386	56.18	▼3.92		
Liberal/National	1,456,640	43.82	▲3.92		
Total	3,324,026	100.00	–		

This is a list of electoral district results for the 2003 New South Wales state election.

== Results by electoral district ==
=== Albury ===
2003 New South Wales state election: Albury
Party	Candidate	Votes	%	±%
Liberal	Greg Aplin	16,826	44.0	+1.0
Independent	Claire Douglas	8,595	22.5	−12.4
Independent	Robert Ballard	5,267	13.8	+13.8
Labor	Nico Mathews	4,710	12.3	−5.3
Greens	Darran Stonehouse	1,092	2.9	+2.9
Independent	Heather Wilton	599	1.6	+1.6
Christian Democrats	Gail Schwartze	518	1.4	+1.4
One Nation	John Morgans	321	0.8	−3.7
AAFI	Sue Galley	305	0.8	+0.8
Total formal votes		38,233	97.5	−1.0
Informal votes		975	2.5	+1.0
Turnout		39,208	91.2	
Notional two-party-preferred count
Liberal	Greg Aplin	20,158	72.5	+7.7
Labor	Nico Mathews	7,656	27.5	−7.7
Two-candidate-preferred result
Liberal	Greg Aplin	19,275	61.5	+10.5
Independent	Claire Douglas	12,059	38.5	−10.5
Liberal hold		Swing	+10.5	

=== Auburn ===
2003 New South Wales state election: Auburn
Party	Candidate	Votes	%	±%
Labor	Barbara Perry	24,764	60.8	+1.3
Liberal	Levent Emirali	6,619	16.2	−3.5
Greens	Steve Maxwell	3,349	8.2	+6.4
Unity	Shui Au	2,697	6.6	−0.8
Christian Democrats	Greg Kaitanovich	1,122	2.8	+2.8
One Nation	Kane O'Connor	811	2.0	−4.2
Democrats	Keith Darley	593	1.4	−1.4
AAFI	Dale Francis	435	1.1	−0.5
Legal System Reform	Thoria Yagoub	201	0.5	+0.5
Socialist Alliance	Roberto Jorquera	172	0.4	−0.5
Total formal votes		40,763	95.6	−0.7
Informal votes		1,895	4.4	+0.7
Turnout		42,658	92.1	
Two-party-preferred result
Labor	Barbara Perry	26,873	77.3	+3.0
Liberal	Levent Emirali	7,911	22.7	−3.0
Labor hold		Swing	+3.0	

=== Ballina ===
2003 New South Wales state election: Ballina
Party	Candidate	Votes	%	±%
National	Don Page	21,127	51.5	−0.9
Labor	Sue Dakin	10,668	26.0	−2.4
Greens	Jan Barham	8,053	19.6	+11.0
Independent	Nic Faulkner	664	1.6	+1.6
One Nation	Darren May	495	1.2	+1.2
Total formal votes		41,007	98.4	+0.4
Informal votes		657	1.6	−0.4
Turnout		41,664	91.0	
Two-party-preferred result
National	Don Page	22,158	59.0	−3.0
Labor	Sue Dakin	15,366	41.0	+3.0
National hold		Swing	−3.0	

=== Bankstown ===
2003 New South Wales state election: Bankstown
Party	Candidate	Votes	%	±%
Labor	Tony Stewart	23,787	62.7	−5.5
Liberal	David Grabovac	5,783	15.2	+0.4
Greens	Sanaa Ghabbar	2,495	6.6	+4.9
Unity	Nasser Roumieh	1,988	5.2	+1.2
Christian Democrats	Janne Peterson	1,259	3.3	+1.2
Socialist Alliance	Sam Wainwright	973	2.6	+2.6
One Nation	Bradley Torr	510	1.3	−4.8
Legal System Reform	Hanan Sowilam	463	1.2	+1.2
Democrats	Joseph McDermott	353	0.9	+0.9
AAFI	Gregg Pringle	352	0.9	+0.1
Total formal votes		37,973	94.5	−1.0
Informal votes		2,210	5.5	+1.0
Turnout		40,183	89.6	
Two-party-preferred result
Labor	Tony Stewart	25,792	78.6	−1.6
Liberal	David Grabovac	7,004	21.4	+1.6
Labor hold		Swing	−1.6	

=== Barwon ===
2003 New South Wales state election: Barwon
Party	Candidate	Votes	%	±%
National	Ian Slack-Smith	19,069	50.7	−0.5
Labor	Meryl Dillon	9,502	25.3	+0.8
Independent	Jack Warnock	6,619	17.6	+17.6
One Nation	Chris Spence	1,127	3.0	−17.5
Greens	David Paull	784	2.1	+2.1
Independent	Richard Stringer	502	1.3	+1.3
Total formal votes		37,603	98.1	−0.2
Informal votes		729	1.9	+0.2
Turnout		38,332	90.6	
Two-party-preferred result
National	Ian Slack-Smith	21,701	66.2	−1.0
Labor	Meryl Dillon	11,102	33.8	+1.0
National hold		Swing	−1.0	

=== Bathurst ===
2003 New South Wales state election: Bathurst
Party	Candidate	Votes	%	±%
Labor	Gerard Martin	22,633	55.3	+4.3
National	Ann Thompson	12,822	31.3	+16.2
Greens	Brian Shoebridge	2,523	6.2	+4.1
Independent	David Simpson	1,059	2.6	+2.6
AAFI	John Wilkie	983	2.4	+1.9
Independent	Warren Rowe	894	2.2	+2.2
Total formal votes		40,914	98.0	−0.1
Informal votes		845	2.0	+0.1
Turnout		41,759	94.1	
Two-party-preferred result
Labor	Gerard Martin	24,285	64.1	−3.8
National	Ann Thompson	13,602	35.9	+3.8
Labor hold		Swing	−3.8	

=== Baulkham Hills ===
2003 New South Wales state election: Baulkham Hills
Party	Candidate	Votes	%	±%
Liberal	Wayne Merton	19,652	47.0	−0.9
Labor	Tony Hay	14,327	34.3	+2.2
Greens	Gabi Martinez	2,880	6.9	+3.7
Christian Democrats	Tania Piper	1,825	4.4	+4.4
Unity	Anne Bi	1,127	2.7	−0.5
Democrats	Margaret van de Weg	1,083	2.6	−4.3
AAFI	George Bilson	889	2.1	+0.2
Total formal votes		41,783	97.8	+0.2
Informal votes		944	2.2	−0.2
Turnout		42,727	93.7	
Two-party-preferred result
Liberal	Wayne Merton	21,150	55.9	−2.3
Labor	Tony Hay	16,705	44.1	+2.3
Liberal hold		Swing	−2.3	

=== Bega ===
2003 New South Wales state election: Bega
Party	Candidate	Votes	%	±%
Liberal	Andrew Constance	17,151	39.3	−6.4
Labor	Wilma Chinnock	13,595	31.2	−0.3
Independent	Chris Vardon	7,094	16.3	+16.3
Greens	Annie Florence	4,349	10.0	+6.7
One Nation	Lynn Abraham	775	1.8	−11.2
Christian Democrats	Ursula Bennett	640	1.5	+1.5
Total formal votes		43,604	97.6	−0.7
Informal votes		1,068	2.4	+0.7
Turnout		44,672	92.7	
Two-party-preferred result
Liberal	Andrew Constance	19,417	53.9	−3.3
Labor	Wilma Chinnock	16,634	46.1	+3.3
Liberal hold		Swing	−3.3	

=== Blacktown ===
2003 New South Wales state election: Blacktown
Party	Candidate	Votes	%	±%
Labor	Paul Gibson	26,160	62.4	+7.7
Liberal	Geoff Bisby	8,297	19.8	−0.1
Christian Democrats	Bob Bawden	2,171	5.2	−0.5
Greens	Jason Bethune	1,771	4.2	+4.2
Independent	Goran Reves	940	2.2	+2.2
Democrats	David King	785	1.9	−5.9
One Nation	Brian Zahner	716	1.7	−7.8
AAFI	Lindon Dedman	694	1.7	−0.8
Unity	Selmen Alameddine	409	1.0	+1.0
Total formal votes		41,943	96.3	−0.2
Informal votes		1,611	3.7	+0.2
Turnout		43,554	92.9	
Two-party-preferred result
Labor	Paul Gibson	27,819	74.5	+5.1
Liberal	Geoff Bisby	9,529	25.5	−5.1
Labor hold		Swing	+5.1	

=== Bligh ===
2003 New South Wales state election: Bligh
Party	Candidate	Votes	%	±%
Independent	Clover Moore	15,330	38.5	+1.2
Labor	Barri Phatarfod	9,071	22.8	−9.1
Liberal	Shayne Mallard	8,496	21.3	−0.1
Greens	Anita Ceravolo	5,634	14.1	+8.2
Unity	Stephen Pong	642	1.6	+0.0
Christian Democrats	Jon Phillips	279	0.7	+0.7
Independent	Malcolm Duncan	268	0.7	+0.0
Independent	Gary Burns	113	0.3	+0.3
Total formal votes		39,833	97.8	+0.1
Informal votes		882	2.2	−0.1
Turnout		40,715	84.3	
Notional two-party-preferred count
Labor	Barri Phatarfod	15,499	60.9	−0.9
Liberal	Shayne Mallard	9,971	39.1	+0.9
Two-candidate-preferred result
Independent	Clover Moore	19,253	64.7	+4.9
Labor	Barri Phatarfod	10,525	35.3	−4.9
Independent hold		Swing	+4.9	

=== Blue Mountains ===
2003 New South Wales state election: Blue Mountains
Party	Candidate	Votes	%	±%
Labor	Bob Debus	19,167	45.6	+0.7
Liberal	Quentin Cook	11,496	27.4	−0.5
Greens	Pippa McInnes	7,223	17.2	+11.1
Christian Democrats	Brian Grigg	2,224	5.3	+0.6
Democrats	Esther Scholem	906	2.2	−5.0
One Nation	George Grivas	855	2.0	−4.8
Unity	Ay Tan	159	0.4	+0.4
Total formal votes		42,030	98.0	−0.3
Informal votes		839	2.0	+0.3
Turnout		42,869	92.7	
Two-party-preferred result
Labor	Bob Debus	24,410	64.8	+3.0
Liberal	Quentin Cook	13,283	35.2	−3.0
Labor hold		Swing	+3.0	

=== Burrinjuck ===
2003 New South Wales state election: Burrinjuck
Party	Candidate	Votes	%	±%
National	Katrina Hodgkinson	20,573	50.3	+21.1
Labor	Michael McManus	16,913	41.3	+4.5
Greens	Bob Muntz	1,743	4.3	+1.7
One Nation	Michael Macdonald	731	1.8	−9.6
Christian Democrats	Susan Pinsuti	533	1.3	+0.0
Independent	Lindsay Cosgrove	421	1.0	+1.0
Total formal votes		40,914	98.5	+0.1
Informal votes		635	1.5	−0.1
Turnout		41,549	93.9	
Two-party-preferred result
National	Katrina Hodgkinson	21,301	54.1	+2.9
Labor	Michael McManus	18,046	45.9	−2.9
National hold		Swing	+2.9	

=== Cabramatta ===
2003 New South Wales state election: Cabramatta
Party	Candidate	Votes	%	±%
Labor	Reba Meagher	25,374	66.5	+17.3
Liberal	Paul Newton	4,245	11.1	+2.9
Independent	Ross Treyvaud	3,830	10.0	+10.0
Unity	Christopher Wong	2,608	6.8	−7.0
Greens	Lee Grant	1,097	2.9	+1.7
Christian Democrats	Sean Hampsey	647	1.7	+0.0
One Nation	David Taunton-Webb	337	0.9	−4.2
Total formal votes		38,138	96.6	+0.7
Informal votes		1,356	3.4	−0.7
Turnout		39,494	92.2	
Two-party-preferred result
Labor	Reba Meagher	27,328	81.7	+12.8
Liberal	Paul Newton	6,115	18.3	+18.3
Labor hold		Swing	+12.8	

=== Camden ===
2003 New South Wales state election: Camden
Party	Candidate	Votes	%	±%
Labor	Geoff Corrigan	23,227	46.8	+9.4
Liberal	Paul Masina	18,510	37.3	−6.4
Greens	Allen Powell	2,461	5.0	+0.9
Independent	Eva Campbell	2,364	4.8	+4.8
Independent	Cindy Cagney	947	1.9	+1.9
AAFI	Max Brazenall	877	1.8	+0.3
One Nation	George Diamantes	803	1.6	−7.4
Democrats	Craig Digby	484	1.0	+1.0
Total formal votes		49,673	97.2	−0.4
Informal votes		1,434	2.8	+0.4
Turnout		51,107	93.4	
Two-party-preferred result
Labor	Geoff Corrigan	24,651	55.4	+8.9
Liberal	Paul Masina	19,814	44.6	−8.9
Labor gain from Liberal		Swing	+8.9	

=== Campbelltown ===
2003 New South Wales state election: Campbelltown
Party	Candidate	Votes	%	±%
Labor	Graham West	23,435	60.1	+5.3
Liberal	David Wright	10,043	25.7	+4.3
Greens	Victoria Waldron Hahn	2,148	5.5	+2.0
AAFI	Charles Byrne	1,593	4.1	+1.6
One Nation	Rosemary Easton	947	2.4	−6.9
Democrats	Leigh Ninham	606	1.6	−2.6
Unity	Ghaleb Alameddine	233	0.6	−1.1
Total formal votes		39,005	96.8	−0.4
Informal votes		1,295	3.2	+0.4
Turnout		40,300	92.7	
Two-party-preferred result
Labor	Graham West	24,524	69.6	−0.3
Liberal	David Wright	10,732	30.4	+0.3
Labor hold		Swing	−0.3	

=== Canterbury ===
2003 New South Wales state election: Canterbury
Party	Candidate	Votes	%	±%
Labor	Linda Burney	21,699	56.0	−0.5
Liberal	Jack Kouzi	6,225	16.1	−0.8
Greens	Dominic Fitzsimmons	4,048	10.4	+6.2
Independent	John Koutsouras	3,470	8.9	+3.9
Unity	Ken Nam	2,322	6.0	+1.3
Save Our Suburbs	Peter Siapos	1,014	2.6	+2.6
Total formal votes		38,778	95.7	+0.0
Informal votes		1,754	4.3	−0.0
Turnout		40,532	91.1	
Two-party-preferred result
Labor	Linda Burney	25,643	77.6	+2.4
Liberal	Jack Kouzi	7,413	22.4	−2.4
Labor hold		Swing	+2.4	

=== Cessnock ===
2003 New South Wales state election: Cessnock
Party	Candidate	Votes	%	±%
Labor	Kerry Hickey	22,843	55.7	+1.2
National	Dale Troy	11,533	28.1	+28.1
Greens	Kerry Suwald	2,926	7.1	+2.1
One Nation	John Bailey	1,573	3.8	−12.2
Independent	Patricia St Lawrence	1,219	3.0	+3.0
Democrats	Graham Capararo	881	2.2	+2.2
Total formal votes		40,975	97.7	−0.4
Informal votes		958	2.3	+0.4
Turnout		41,933	93.8	
Two-party-preferred result
Labor	Kerry Hickey	24,282	65.5	−7.1
National	Dale Troy	12,766	34.5	+34.5
Labor hold		Swing	−7.1	

=== Charlestown ===
2003 New South Wales state election: Charlestown
Party	Candidate	Votes	%	±%
Labor	Matthew Morris	20,426	50.5	−4.2
Liberal	Fiona Glen	11,025	27.2	+4.9
Greens	Keith Parsons	3,545	8.8	+2.4
Independent	Peter Nikoletatos	1,576	3.9	+3.9
Independent	Kate Ferguson	1,400	3.5	+3.5
Christian Democrats	Jennifer Boswell	1,041	2.6	−0.3
One Nation	John Phillips	699	1.7	−8.5
AAFI	James Bateman	516	1.3	+1.3
Socialist Alliance	Kathy Newnam	256	0.6	+0.6
Total formal votes		40,484	97.2	−0.7
Informal votes		1,157	2.8	+0.7
Turnout		41,641	93.8	
Two-party-preferred result
Labor	Matthew Morris	22,410	64.7	−4.6
Liberal	Fiona Glen	12,235	35.3	+4.6
Labor hold		Swing	−4.6	

=== Clarence ===
2003 New South Wales state election: Clarence
Party	Candidate	Votes	%	±%
National	Steve Cansdell	17,683	44.6	+19.2
Labor	Terry Flanagan	15,613	39.3	+2.4
Greens	Mark Purcell	2,627	6.6	+3.2
Independent	Marie Mathew	1,047	2.6	+2.6
Christian Democrats	Brian Hughes	891	2.2	+0.2
Independent	Doug Behn	856	2.2	+0.8
One Nation	Marjorie Burston	711	1.8	−9.0
Democrats	Alec York	257	0.6	−0.7
Total formal votes		39,685	98.2	−0.3
Informal votes		715	1.8	+0.3
Turnout		40,400	92.1	
Two-party-preferred result
National	Steve Cansdell	18,817	51.6	+1.8
Labor	Terry Flanagan	17,644	48.4	−1.8
National gain from Labor		Swing	+1.8	

=== Coffs Harbour ===
2003 New South Wales state election: Coffs Harbour
Party	Candidate	Votes	%	±%
National	Andrew Fraser	16,728	40.4	−5.7
Labor	Pamela Stephenson	7,811	18.9	−11.7
Independent	Jan Strom	7,475	18.1	+18.1
Independent	Keith Rhoades	4,411	10.7	+10.7
Greens	Gabrielle Tindall	2,952	7.1	+3.6
Christian Democrats	Greg Holder	1,417	3.4	+3.4
One Nation	Tenille Burston	487	1.2	−10.1
Independent	Evalds Erglis	109	0.3	−0.4
Total formal votes		41,390	98.0	−0.3
Informal votes		854	2.0	+0.3
Turnout		42,244	92.4	
Notional two-party-preferred count
National	Andrew Fraser	19,781	64.3	+6.0
Labor	Pamela Stephenson	10,974	35.7	−6.0
Two-candidate-preferred result
National	Andrew Fraser	18,817	56.9	−1.4
Independent	Jan Strom	14,263	43.1	+43.1
National hold		Swing	−1.4	

=== Coogee ===
2003 New South Wales state election: Coogee
Party	Candidate	Votes	%	±%
Labor	Paul Pearce	16,361	44.4	−5.0
Liberal	David McBride	11,669	31.7	−1.0
Greens	Murray Matson	6,848	18.6	+9.3
Democrats	Lindy Morrison	870	2.4	−3.3
Independent	Barry Watterson	773	2.1	+2.1
Unity	Lisa Li	300	0.8	+0.8
Total formal votes		36,821	98.1	+0.0
Informal votes		727	1.9	−0.0
Turnout		37,548	87.8	
Two-party-preferred result
Labor	Paul Pearce	20,728	62.6	+0.3
Liberal	David McBride	12,381	37.4	−0.3
Labor hold		Swing	+0.3	

=== Cronulla ===
2003 New South Wales state election: Cronulla
Party	Candidate	Votes	%	±%
Liberal	Malcolm Kerr	18,669	45.9	+1.0
Labor	Scott Docherty	11,549	28.4	−6.5
Independent	Tracie Sonda	5,836	14.4	+14.4
Greens	John Vlamitsopoulos	2,173	5.3	+0.6
Christian Democrats	Beth Smith	1,046	2.6	+0.1
AAFI	Warren Feinbier	761	1.9	+0.3
One Nation	Renata McCallum	394	1.0	−6.6
Unity	Siu Au	206	0.5	+0.5
Total formal votes		40,634	97.8	+0.0
Informal votes		911	2.2	−0.0
Turnout		41,545	92.7	
Two-party-preferred result
Liberal	Malcolm Kerr	20,402	59.3	+4.2
Labor	Scott Docherty	14,024	40.7	−4.2
Liberal hold		Swing	+4.2	

=== Davidson ===
2003 New South Wales state election: Davidson
Party	Candidate	Votes	%	±%
Liberal	Andrew Humpherson	23,795	58.7	+1.1
Labor	Angelo Rozos	8,411	20.7	−0.4
Greens	Conny Harris	4,853	12.0	+7.6
Christian Democrats	Wally Vanderpoll	1,144	2.8	−0.3
Unity	Zi Cai	880	2.2	−0.5
Democrats	Daniel Stevens	790	1.9	−4.1
AAFI	John Collins	663	1.6	+0.5
Total formal votes		40,536	98.1	+0.1
Informal votes		779	1.9	−0.1
Turnout		41,315	91.3	
Two-party-preferred result
Liberal	Andrew Humpherson	25,454	69.7	−1.4
Labor	Angelo Rozos	11,087	30.3	+1.4
Liberal hold		Swing	−1.4	

=== Drummoyne ===
2003 New South Wales state election: Drummoyne
Party	Candidate	Votes	%	±%
Labor	Angela D'Amore	20,620	47.2	+1.3
Liberal	Greg Long	15,328	35.1	+2.5
Greens	Mersina Soulos	3,951	9.1	+4.7
Independent	Michael Wroblewski	1,323	3.0	+3.0
Unity	Tina Turrisi	625	1.4	+1.4
Independent	Salvatore Scevola	584	1.3	+1.3
Democrats	Andrew Blake	567	1.3	−3.1
AAFI	Alexander Pini	376	0.9	+0.2
Independent	Stephen Muller	162	0.4	+0.4
	Stephen Bathgate	118	0.3	+0.3
Total formal votes		43,654	97.3	+0.4
Informal votes		1,225	2.7	−0.4
Turnout		44,879	92.1	
Two-party-preferred result
Labor	Angela D'Amore	23,041	58.7	−0.7
Liberal	Greg Long	16,178	41.3	+0.7
Labor hold		Swing	−0.7	

=== Dubbo ===
2003 New South Wales state election: Dubbo
Party	Candidate	Votes	%	±%
Independent	Tony McGrane	16,696	41.3	+18.6
National	Mark Horton	15,460	38.2	+6.4
Labor	Leo Dawson	6,092	15.1	−5.2
Greens	Steve Maier	1,082	2.7	+1.4
One Nation	Ian Hutchins	651	1.6	−16.5
AAFI	Ronald Atkins	466	1.2	+1.2
Total formal votes		40,447	98.3	+0.2
Informal votes		690	1.7	−0.2
Turnout		41,137	94.1	
Notional two-party-preferred count
National	Mark Horton	19,886	68.7	+8.2
Labor	Leo Dawson	9,063	31.3	−8.2
Two-candidate-preferred result
Independent	Tony McGrane	20,099	55.0	+5.0
National	Mark Horton	16,413	45.0	−5.0
Independent hold		Swing	+5.0	

=== East Hills ===
2003 New South Wales state election: East Hills
Party	Candidate	Votes	%	±%
Labor	Alan Ashton	22,367	55.2	+6.0
Liberal	Glenn Brookes	9,606	23.7	+4.3
Greens	Sonya McKay	2,570	6.3	+4.1
Christian Democrats	Karen Reid	1,796	4.4	+4.4
One Nation	Mark Potter	1,633	4.0	−6.7
Independent	Alan Cronin	789	1.9	+1.9
AAFI	Howard Dakin	740	1.8	−1.5
Unity	Stanley Xie	698	1.7	+1.7
Democrats	Nabil Dabbagh	357	0.9	−1.6
Total formal votes		40,556	96.6	+0.0
Informal votes		1,429	3.4	−0.0
Turnout		41,985	94.2	
Two-party-preferred result
Labor	Alan Ashton	24,441	68.5	+0.2
Liberal	Glenn Brookes	11,221	31.5	−0.2
Labor hold		Swing	+0.2	

=== Epping ===
2003 New South Wales state election: Epping
Party	Candidate	Votes	%	±%
Liberal	Andrew Tink	18,452	45.6	+1.5
Labor	Mark Lyons	11,705	28.9	−0.6
Greens	Matthew Benson	4,510	11.1	+5.4
Unity	David Chan	2,453	6.1	+0.7
Christian Democrats	Owen Nannelli	1,765	4.4	−0.2
AAFI	David Mudgee	792	2.0	+0.9
Democrats	Philip Sparks	784	1.9	−4.6
Total formal votes		40,461	98.0	−0.4
Informal votes		814	2.0	+0.4
Turnout		41,275	91.5	
Two-party-preferred result
Liberal	Andrew Tink	20,458	56.9	−0.2
Labor	Mark Lyons	15,524	43.1	+0.2
Liberal hold		Swing	−0.2	

=== Fairfield ===
2003 New South Wales state election: Fairfield
Party	Candidate	Votes	%	±%
Labor	Joe Tripodi	24,534	63.7	+3.6
Liberal	Karam Awad	6,914	17.9	+3.4
Unity	Nguyen Truong	3,305	8.6	−0.2
Greens	Roger Barsony	2,023	5.2	+3.0
One Nation	Nada Taunton-Henderson	891	2.3	−5.2
AAFI	Michael Chehoff	876	2.3	+1.0
Total formal votes		38,543	95.5	+0.1
Informal votes		1,836	4.5	−0.1
Turnout		40,379	91.5	
Two-party-preferred result
Labor	Joe Tripodi	26,157	77.0	−1.3
Liberal	Karam Awad	7,833	23.0	+1.3
Labor hold		Swing	−1.3	

=== Georges River ===
2003 New South Wales state election: Georges River
Party	Candidate	Votes	%	±%
Labor	Kevin Greene	21,840	52.4	+5.3
Liberal	Joanne McCafferty	13,148	31.5	−5.4
Greens	Christine Welsh	2,504	6.0	+3.0
Unity	John Lau	1,872	4.5	+2.5
Independent	Michele Adair	1,246	3.0	+3.0
AAFI	Francis Bush	577	1.4	−0.6
One Nation	Mary Kennedy	529	1.3	−4.0
Total formal votes		24,628	97.7	−0.1
Informal votes		1,002	2.3	+0.1
Turnout		42,718	92.7	
Two-party-preferred result
Labor	Kevin Greene	24,628	63.7	+7.4
Liberal	Joanne McCafferty	14,054	36.3	−7.4
Labor hold		Swing	+7.4	

=== Gosford ===
2003 New South Wales state election: Gosford
Party	Candidate	Votes	%	±%
Liberal	Chris Hartcher	20,477	46.3	+2.9
Labor	Deborah O'Neill	19,098	43.1	+3.0
Greens	Mark Dickinson	3,146	7.1	+4.3
Save Our Suburbs	Ian Lamont	716	1.6	+1.6
Democrats	Allison Newman	602	1.4	−2.0
Unity	Yieu Mak	234	0.5	+0.5
Total formal votes		44,273	98.1	+0.0
Informal votes		875	1.9	−0.0
Turnout		45,148	92.3	
Two-party-preferred result
Liberal	Chris Hartcher	21,015	50.3	−2.0
Labor	Deborah O'Neill	20,743	49.7	+2.0
Liberal hold		Swing	−2.0	

=== Granville ===
2003 New South Wales state election: Granville
Party	Candidate	Votes	%	±%
Labor	Kim Yeadon	22,448	59.3	+3.0
Liberal	Judy Irvine	9,522	25.1	−4.2
Greens	Wafaa Salti	1,903	5.0	+1.5
Christian Democrats	Karen Pender	1,307	3.5	+3.5
Unity	Somchai Tongsumrith	819	2.2	+2.2
One Nation	Shane O'Connor	612	1.6	−7.5
AAFI	John McGrath	556	1.5	−0.3
Democrats	Colin McDermott	392	1.0	+1.0
Independent	John Drake	324	0.9	+0.9
Total formal votes		37,883	95.6	−0.8
Informal votes		1,738	4.4	+0.8
Turnout		39,621	92.1	
Two-party-preferred result
Labor	Kim Yeadon	23,854	69.5	+4.9
Liberal	Judy Irvine	10,465	30.5	−4.9
Labor hold		Swing	+4.9	

=== Hawkesbury ===
2003 New South Wales state election: Hawkesbury
Party	Candidate	Votes	%	±%
Liberal	Steven Pringle	19,751	44.4	−3.0
Labor	Carl Bazeley	9,582	21.5	−3.4
Independent	Rex Stubbs	5,570	12.5	+12.5
Greens	Laurie Fraser	3,182	7.1	+1.8
Independent	John Griffiths	3,132	7.0	+7.0
Independent	Judy Pope	1,140	2.6	+2.6
One Nation	Noeline Saxiones	794	1.8	−7.5
AAFI	Hugh McNaught	756	1.7	+0.5
Democrats	Bruce van de Weg	446	1.0	−3.7
Unity	Ngoc Vuong	157	0.4	+0.4
Total formal votes		44,510	97.4	−0.4
Informal votes		1,204	2.6	+0.4
Turnout		45,714	92.8	
Two-party-preferred result
Liberal	Steven Pringle	22,037	64.1	+0.8
Labor	Carl Bazeley	12,367	35.9	−0.8
Liberal hold		Swing	+0.8	

=== Heathcote ===
2003 New South Wales state election: Heathcote
Party	Candidate	Votes	%	±%
Labor	Paul McLeay	19,502	46.8	−0.1
Liberal	Peter Vermeer	13,957	33.5	+3.3
Greens	Tanya Leishman	4,109	9.9	+4.3
Christian Democrats	Jim Bowen	1,688	4.1	+0.8
One Nation	Peter McCallum	1,059	2.5	−5.8
AAFI	Michael Toohey	949	2.3	+1.1
Horse Riders	Christopher Camp	368	0.9	+0.9
Total formal votes		41,632	97.8	−0.3
Informal votes		925	2.2	+0.3
Turnout		42,557	93.9	
Two-party-preferred result
Labor	Paul McLeay	22,209	58.7	−1.7
Liberal	Peter Vermeer	15,598	41.3	+1.7
Labor hold		Swing	−1.7	

=== Heffron ===
2003 New South Wales state election: Heffron
Party	Candidate	Votes	%	±%
Labor	Kristina Keneally	21,780	57.4	−6.0
Liberal	Sarah Lawrance	7,061	18.6	−0.8
Greens	Will Smith	4,837	12.7	+7.3
Independent	Margery Whitehead	1,605	4.2	+4.2
Independent	John Bush	919	2.4	+2.4
Unity	Alan Lai	808	2.1	+2.1
Independent	John Tullis	488	1.3	+1.3
Democrats	Stephen Chanphakeo	456	1.2	−2.8
Total formal votes		37,954	96.2	
Informal votes		1,486	3.8	
Turnout		39,440	89.8	
Two-party-preferred result
Labor	Kristina Keneally	24,332	73.9	−2.2
Liberal	Sarah Lawrance	8,603	26.1	+2.2
Labor hold		Swing	−2.2	

=== Hornsby ===
2003 New South Wales state election: Hornsby
Party	Candidate	Votes	%	±%
Liberal	Judy Hopwood	18,780	44.2	+3.1
Labor	Susan White	14,696	34.6	+0.8
Greens	Wendy McMurdo	3,967	9.3	+5.5
Independent	Mick Gallagher	1,659	3.9	−0.7
Christian Democrats	John Salvaggio	1,408	3.3	+3.3
Unity	William Chan	715	1.7	−0.3
AAFI	David Wadsworth	615	1.4	+0.5
Democrats	Kate Orman	608	1.4	−3.5
Total formal votes		42,448	98.0	+0.3
Informal votes		857	2.0	−0.3
Turnout		43,305	92.9	
Two-party-preferred result
Liberal	Judy Hopwood	20,321	53.1	+0.4
Labor	Susan White	17,923	46.9	−0.4
Liberal hold		Swing	+0.4	

=== Illawarra ===
2003 New South Wales state election: Illawarra
Party	Candidate	Votes	%	±%
Labor	Marianne Saliba	23,270	55.7	+4.9
Liberal	Benjamin Caldwell	6,372	15.3	−0.9
Greens	Margaret Johanson	4,270	10.2	+5.6
Christian Democrats	Richard Harris	1,973	4.7	−2.2
Independent	Barry Hennessy	1,848	4.4	+4.4
Independent	Charles Mifsud	1,643	3.9	+3.9
One Nation	Robert Kennedy	1,149	2.8	−6.1
AAFI	John Cipov	588	1.4	−0.2
Independent	Bill Heycott	465	1.1	+1.1
Socialist Alliance	Chris Williams	187	0.4	+0.4
Total formal votes		41,765	96.3	−0.9
Informal votes		1,612	3.7	+0.9
Turnout		43,377	94.0	
Two-party-preferred result
Labor	Marianne Saliba	26,135	74.8	+2.0
Liberal	Benjamin Caldwell	8,808	25.2	−2.0
Labor hold		Swing	+2.0	

=== Keira ===
2003 New South Wales state election: Keira
Party	Candidate	Votes	%	±%
Labor	David Campbell	22,199	55.9	+10.5
Greens	Michael Sergent	7,684	19.3	+19.3
Liberal	Lee Evans	6,760	17.0	+5.8
Christian Democrats	George Carfield	1,473	3.7	+0.3
AAFI	Garth Fraser	922	2.3	+1.5
One Nation	Frederick Leach	699	1.8	−4.9
Total formal votes		39,737	96.6	−1.3
Informal votes		1,410	3.4	+1.3
Turnout		41,147	94.0	
Notional two-party-preferred count
Labor	David Campbell	27,127	75.5	+3.5
Liberal	Lee Evans	8,781	24.5	−3.5
Two-candidate-preferred result
Labor	David Campbell	24,507	72.5	+14.6
Greens	Michael Sergent	9,298	27.5	+27.5
Labor hold		Swing	+14.6	

=== Kiama ===
2003 New South Wales state election: Kiama
Party	Candidate	Votes	%	±%
Labor	Matt Brown	25,074	56.2	+6.8
Liberal	Danielle Jones	11,993	26.9	+5.1
Greens	Howard Jones	4,107	9.2	+1.5
Christian Democrats	John Kadwell	1,667	3.7	−0.6
One Nation	Helga Green	698	1.6	−7.6
Democrats	Henry Collier	529	1.2	−2.1
AAFI	Clive Curnow	523	1.2	+0.0
Total formal votes		44,591	97.7	+0.1
Informal votes		1,059	2.3	−0.1
Turnout		45,650	93.9	
Two-party-preferred result
Labor	Matt Brown	27,208	66.9	−0.8
Liberal	Danielle Jones	13,471	33.1	+0.8
Labor hold		Swing	−0.8	

=== Kogarah ===
2003 New South Wales state election: Kogarah
Party	Candidate	Votes	%	±%
Labor	Cherie Burton	23,778	59.2	+11.2
Liberal	Val Colyer	11,209	27.9	−6.9
Greens	Soraya Kassim	2,749	6.8	+3.6
Unity	Naxin Liu	1,736	4.3	+1.3
Democrats	Alison Bailey	701	1.7	+1.7
Total formal votes		40,173	96.8	−0.1
Informal votes		1,344	3.2	+0.1
Turnout		41,517	92.5	
Two-party-preferred result
Labor	Cherie Burton	26,355	69.2	+11.7
Liberal	Val Colyer	11,703	30.8	−11.7
Labor hold		Swing	+11.7	

=== Ku-ring-gai ===
2003 New South Wales state election: Ku-ring-gai
Party	Candidate	Votes	%	±%
Liberal	Barry O'Farrell	24,796	61.1	+4.8
Labor	Andrew Hewitt	7,548	18.6	−1.8
Greens	Susie Gemmell	5,064	12.5	+7.5
Unity	Chiming Shea	1,184	2.9	+2.9
Christian Democrats	Witold Wiszniewski	1,165	2.9	−1.3
Democrats	Ian Boyd	821	2.0	−7.3
Total formal votes		40,578	98.4	+0.1
Informal votes		680	1.6	−0.1
Turnout		41,258	91.7	
Two-party-preferred result
Liberal	Barry O'Farrell	26,582	71.6	+1.6
Labor	Andrew Hewitt	10,543	28.4	−1.6
Liberal hold		Swing	+1.6	

=== Lachlan ===
2003 New South Wales state election: Lachlan
Party	Candidate	Votes	%	±%
National	Ian Armstrong	26,961	66.0	+10.9
Labor	Stephen Pollard	10,374	25.4	−2.1
One Nation	Russell Constable	1,791	4.4	−8.6
Greens	Jenny McKinnon	1,696	4.2	+2.5
Total formal votes		40,822	98.0	+0.1
Informal votes		814	2.0	−0.1
Turnout		41,636	93.8	
Two-party-preferred result
National	Ian Armstrong	27,830	71.2	+4.9
Labor	Stephen Pollard	11,253	28.8	−4.9
National hold		Swing	+4.9	

=== Lake Macquarie ===
2003 New South Wales state election: Lake Macquarie
Party	Candidate	Votes	%	±%
Labor	Jeff Hunter	23,520	54.9	+0.1
Liberal	Michael Chamberlain	13,138	30.7	+8.3
Greens	Howard Morrison	3,539	8.3	+3.2
AAFI	Leonard Hodge	1,329	3.1	+0.9
One Nation	Trevor Gander	1,298	3.0	−9.2
Total formal votes		42,824	97.5	−0.4
Informal votes		1,114	2.5	+0.4
Turnout		43,938	93.5	
Two-party-preferred result
Labor	Jeff Hunter	25,427	64.5	−4.7
Liberal	Michael Chamberlain	14,016	35.5	+4.7
Labor hold		Swing	−4.7	

=== Lakemba ===
2003 New South Wales state election: Lakemba
Party	Candidate	Votes	%	±%
Labor	Morris Iemma	24,060	64.2	+1.0
Liberal	Daniel Try	6,503	17.4	+0.4
Greens	Bashir Sawalha	2,499	6.7	+6.7
Unity	Gengxing Chen	1,640	4.4	+4.4
Independent	Gregory Briscoe-Hough	1,167	3.1	+3.1
Christian Democrats	Zarif Abdulla	1,055	2.8	+2.8
Legal System Reform	Mary Habib	344	0.9	+0.9
	Robert Aiken	204	0.5	+0.5
Total formal votes		37,472	95.9	−0.5
Informal votes		1,621	4.1	+0.5
Turnout		39,093	91.1	
Two-party-preferred result
Labor	Morris Iemma	25,734	77.4	+2.7
Liberal	Daniel Try	7,493	22.6	−2.7
Labor hold		Swing	+2.7	

=== Lane Cove ===
2003 New South Wales state election: Lane Cove
Party	Candidate	Votes	%	±%
Liberal	Anthony Roberts	18,302	46.4	−3.4
Labor	Gabrielle O'Donnell	12,894	32.7	+0.4
Greens	Shauna Forrest	6,162	15.6	+10.4
Democrats	Suzanne McGillivray	1,234	3.1	−6.1
Unity	Pei Li	835	2.1	+2.1
Total formal votes		39,427	97.5	−0.1
Informal votes		994	2.5	+0.1
Turnout		40,421	90.7	
Two-party-preferred result
Liberal	Anthony Roberts	19,343	53.2	−4.2
Labor	Gabrielle O'Donnell	17,002	46.8	+4.2
Liberal hold		Swing	−4.2	

=== Lismore ===
2003 New South Wales state election: Lismore
Party	Candidate	Votes	%	±%
National	Thomas George	21,680	55.9	+16.7
Labor	Peter Lanyon	9,703	25.0	−2.7
Greens	John Corkill	5,797	15.0	+5.3
Independent	Angela Griffiths	724	1.9	+1.9
Democrats	Julia Melland	592	1.5	−1.8
Socialist Alliance	Nick Fredman	261	0.7	+0.7
Total formal votes		38,757	98.4	+0.3
Informal votes		614	1.6	−0.3
Turnout		39,371	92.3	
Two-party-preferred result
National	Thomas George	22,359	62.8	+4.3
Labor	Peter Lanyon	13,220	37.2	−4.3
National hold		Swing	+4.3	

=== Liverpool ===
2003 New South Wales state election: Liverpool
Party	Candidate	Votes	%	±%
Labor	Paul Lynch	29,097	69.6	+2.6
Liberal	Domenico Acitelli	6,349	15.2	−1.8
Greens	Michael Tierney	2,051	4.9	+4.9
One Nation	Michael Boland	1,402	3.4	−5.5
Christian Democrats	Godwin Goh	1,180	2.8	+2.8
AAFI	Victor Boyd	890	2.1	+0.0
Unity	Ahmad Alameddine	835	2.0	−2.2
Total formal votes		41,804	95.0	−0.9
Informal votes		2,191	5.0	+0.9
Turnout		43,995	92.3	
Two-party-preferred result
Labor	Paul Lynch	30,335	80.7	+2.1
Liberal	Domenico Acitelli	7,246	19.3	−2.1
Labor hold		Swing	+2.1	

=== Londonderry ===
2003 New South Wales state election: Londonderry (supplementary)
Party	Candidate	Votes	%	±%
Labor	Allan Shearan	17,284	52.3	+3.3
Independent	Boyd Falconer	7,800	23.6	+23.6
Greens	Allan Quinn	2,388	7.2	+3.8
AAFI	Janey Woodger	2,097	6.3	+4.8
Christian Democrats	John Phillips	1,890	5.7	+2.1
One Nation	Col Easton	1,041	3.1	−8.0
Independent	Norman Hooper	570	1.7	+1.7
Total formal votes		33,070	96.5	+0.1
Informal votes		1,210	3.5	−0.1
Turnout		34,280	77.2	
Two-candidate-preferred result
Labor	Allan Shearan	18,073	65.3	+0.4
Independent	Boyd Falconer	9,621	34.7	+34.7
Labor hold		Swing	+0.4	

=== Macquarie Fields ===
2003 New South Wales state election: Macquarie Fields
Party	Candidate	Votes	%	±%
Labor	Craig Knowles	30,036	62.6	+0.7
Liberal	Jai Rowell	10,974	22.9	+2.0
Greens	Peter Butler	2,187	4.6	+4.6
Christian Democrats	Jim Parkins	1,471	3.1	+3.1
One Nation	Rhonda McDonald	979	2.0	−7.0
AAFI	James Grindrod	909	1.9	−0.7
Democrats	William Body	503	1.0	−2.0
Independent	Mick Allen	476	1.0	−1.0
Unity	Kek Tai	438	0.9	+0.9
Total formal votes		47,973	96.4	−0.4
Informal votes		1,817	3.6	+0.4
Turnout		49,790	91.8	
Two-party-preferred result
Labor	Craig Knowles	31,394	72.5	−1.0
Liberal	Jai Rowell	11,903	27.5	+1.0
Labor hold		Swing	−1.0	

=== Maitland ===
2003 New South Wales state election: Maitland
Party	Candidate	Votes	%	±%
Labor	John Price	22,068	47.5	+4.6
Liberal	Bob Geoghegan	15,382	33.1	−7.9
Independent	Ann Lawler	3,405	7.3	+6.5
Greens	Aina Ranke	2,595	5.6	+2.6
Independent	John Lee	1,707	3.7	+3.7
One Nation	Christine Ferguson	616	1.3	−6.7
Democrats	Sharon Davies	455	1.0	−0.8
Unity	Loan Truong	200	0.4	+0.4
Total formal votes		46,428	97.8	−0.7
Informal votes		1,025	2.2	+0.7
Turnout		47,453	95.1	
Two-party-preferred result
Labor	John Price	24,226	58.9	+7.9
Liberal	Bob Geoghegan	16,891	41.1	−7.9
Labor hold		Swing	+7.9	

=== Manly ===
2003 New South Wales state election: Manly
Party	Candidate	Votes	%	±%
Liberal	Jean Hay	15,939	41.0	+2.3
Independent	David Barr	12,969	33.4	+3.2
Labor	Hugh Zochling	4,762	12.3	−4.5
Greens	Keelah Lam	3,231	8.3	+3.1
Independent	Mark Norek	718	1.8	+1.8
AAFI	David Prior	673	1.7	+0.9
Christian Democrats	Marjorie Moffitt	366	0.9	+0.9
Unity	John Yuen	179	0.5	−0.3
Total formal votes		38,837	98.1	+0.2
Informal votes		763	1.9	−0.2
Turnout		39,600	90.3	
Notional two-party-preferred count
Liberal	Jean Hay	17,741	64.8	+5.4
Labor	Hugh Zochling	9,616	35.2	−5.4
Two-candidate-preferred result
Independent	David Barr	17,623	51.3	+0.0
Liberal	Jean Hay	16,753	48.7	-0.0
Independent hold		Swing	+0.0	

=== Maroubra ===
2003 New South Wales state election: Maroubra
Party	Candidate	Votes	%	±%
Labor	Bob Carr	24,958	64.1	+4.8
Liberal	David Coleman	9,298	23.9	−0.2
Greens	Rik Jurcevic	3,270	8.4	+3.3
Unity	Chuan Ren	826	2.1	−0.4
Democrats	Kirsten Bennell	558	1.4	−1.9
Total formal votes		38,910	97.6	+0.5
Informal votes		968	2.4	−0.5
Turnout		39,878	90.5	
Two-party-preferred result
Labor	Bob Carr	26,979	73.5	+3.6
Liberal	David Coleman	9,739	26.5	−3.6
Labor hold		Swing	+3.0	

=== Marrickville ===
2003 New South Wales state election: Marrickville
Party	Candidate	Votes	%	±%
Labor	Andrew Refshauge	18,885	48.4	−5.4
Greens	Colin Hesse	11,109	28.5	+16.7
Liberal	Ramzy Mansour	5,005	12.8	−0.7
Socialist Alliance	Sue Johnson	1,061	2.7	+2.7
Democrats	David Mendelssohn	979	2.5	−6.1
Unity	Henson Liang	843	2.2	−0.1
Independent	Richard Rae	600	1.5	+1.5
Save Our Suburbs	Lorraine Thomson	533	1.4	+1.4
Total formal votes		39,015	96.9	+0.2
Informal votes		1,264	3.1	−0.2
Turnout		40,279	88.4	
Notional two-party-preferred count
Labor	Andrew Refshauge	25,123	81.5	+2.1
Liberal	Ramzy Mansour	5,700	18.5	−2.1
Two-candidate-preferred result
Labor	Andrew Refshauge	20,037	60.7	−10.8
Greens	Colin Hesse	12,974	39.3	+10.8
Labor hold		Swing	−10.8	

=== Menai ===
2003 New South Wales state election: Menai
Party	Candidate	Votes	%	±%
Labor	Alison Megarrity	23,332	52.6	+9.4
Liberal	Brett Thomas	16,326	36.8	−0.2
Greens	Tina Palladinetti	2,059	4.6	+0.4
One Nation	Susan Oz	954	2.2	−5.8
Independent	Michael Byrne	814	1.8	+1.8
Democrats	Gemma Edgar	478	1.1	−1.8
Unity	Thomas Su	359	0.8	+0.8
Total formal votes		44,322	97.8	+0.7
Informal votes		1,010	2.2	−0.7
Turnout		45,332	93.6	
Two-party-preferred result
Labor	Alison Megarrity	24,873	59.5	+5.3
Liberal	Brett Thomas	16,906	40.5	−5.3
Labor hold		Swing	+5.3	

=== Miranda ===
2003 New South Wales state election: Miranda
Party	Candidate	Votes	%	±%
Labor	Barry Collier	20,489	51.7	+8.8
Liberal	Kevin Schreiber	14,493	36.6	−4.0
Greens	Julie Simpson	2,322	5.9	+1.8
Save Our Suburbs	Gordon Hocking	783	2.0	+2.0
AAFI	Allan Duckett	657	1.7	+0.1
Independent	John Moffat	590	1.5	+1.5
Unity	Lisan Yang	263	0.7	+0.7
Total formal votes		39,597	98.0	+0.0
Informal votes		814	2.0	−0.0
Turnout		40,411	93.1	
Two-party-preferred result
Labor	Barry Collier	21,758	59.1	+6.8
Liberal	Kevin Schreiber	15,036	40.9	−6.8
Labor hold		Swing	+6.8	

=== Monaro ===
2003 New South Wales state election: Monaro
Party	Candidate	Votes	%	±%
Labor	Steve Whan	18,953	45.1	+13.4
National	Peter Webb	17,909	42.7	+20.5
Greens	Catherine Moore	3,359	8.0	+3.3
Independent	Carol Atkins	1,184	2.8	+2.8
One Nation	Ian Hale	584	1.4	−6.1
Total formal votes		41,989	97.8	+0.0
Informal votes		960	2.2	−0.0
Turnout		42,949	91.4	
Two-party-preferred result
Labor	Steve Whan	21,291	53.3	+3.5
National	Peter Webb	18,634	46.7	−3.5
Labor gain from National		Swing	+3.5	

=== Mount Druitt ===
2003 New South Wales state election: Mount Druitt
Party	Candidate	Votes	%	±%
Labor	Richard Amery	26,262	65.9	+6.3
Liberal	Allan Green	7,199	18.1	+2.1
Christian Democrats	Joseph Wyness	2,322	5.8	+1.3
Greens	Brent Robertson	1,485	3.7	+0.8
AAFI	Richard Newton	988	2.5	+0.9
Save Our Suburbs	Peter Kerr	811	2.0	+2.0
Democrats	Alicia Lantry	507	1.3	−2.5
Unity	John Uri	271	0.7	−2.1
Total formal votes		39,845	95.5	−1.0
Informal votes		1,899	4.5	+1.0
Turnout		41,744	91.9	
Two-party-preferred result
Labor	Richard Amery	27,500	76.8	+1.0
Liberal	Allan Green	8,314	23.2	−1.0
Labor hold		Swing	+1.0	

=== Mulgoa ===
2003 New South Wales state election: Mulgoa
Party	Candidate	Votes	%	±%
Labor	Diane Beamer	25,941	59.5	+6.4
Liberal	Christine Bourne	12,006	27.5	+3.3
Greens	William Gayed	1,754	4.0	+2.0
Save Our Suburbs	Jean Lopez	1,474	3.4	+3.4
AAFI	Dennis Fordyce	1,061	2.4	+1.4
One Nation	Michael Church	876	2.0	−6.9
Democrats	Lorraine Dodd	497	1.1	−2.1
Total formal votes		43,609	96.1	−0.2
Informal votes		1,757	3.9	+0.2
Turnout		45,366	93.3	
Two-party-preferred result
Labor	Diane Beamer	26,953	67.9	+0.3
Liberal	Christine Bourne	12,742	32.1	−0.3
Labor hold		Swing	+0.3	

=== Murray-Darling ===
2003 New South Wales state election: Murray-Darling
Party	Candidate	Votes	%	±%
Labor	Peter Black	17,659	50.3	+6.1
National	Marsha Isbester	13,072	37.3	+1.0
Independent	Don McKinnon	2,092	6.0	+6.0
One Nation	Tom Kennedy	1,463	4.2	−12.2
Greens	Geoff Walch	803	2.3	+2.3
Total formal votes		35,099	97.3	−0.9
Informal votes		988	2.7	+0.9
Turnout		36,077	87.6	
Two-party-preferred result
Labor	Peter Black	18,594	56.7	+2.5
National	Marsha Isbester	14,214	43.3	−2.5
Labor hold		Swing	+2.5	

=== Murrumbidgee ===
2003 New South Wales state election: Murrumbidgee
Party	Candidate	Votes	%	±%
National	Adrian Piccoli	26,150	65.9	+11.4
Labor	Michael Kidd	11,878	29.9	−2.8
Greens	Martin Ducker	1,656	4.2	+4.2
Total formal votes		39,684	98.0	+0.1
Informal votes		800	2.0	−0.1
Turnout		40,484	91.9	
Two-party-preferred result
National	Adrian Piccoli	26,444	67.8	+5.8
Labor	Michael Kidd	12,543	32.2	−5.8
National hold		Swing	+5.8	

=== Myall Lakes ===
2003 New South Wales state election: Myall Lakes
Party	Candidate	Votes	%	±%
National	John Turner	18,745	43.8	−7.5
Labor	Lisa Clancy	9,661	22.6	−6.8
Independent	Mick Tuck	5,198	12.1	+12.1
Independent	John Chadban	4,793	11.2	+11.2
Greens	Linda Gill	1,901	4.4	+0.2
One Nation	Colleen Burston	733	1.7	−11.9
Fishing Party	Paul Hennelly	620	1.4	+1.4
AAFI	Barry Moulds	474	1.1	−0.4
Independent	Ian McCaffrey	471	1.1	+1.1
Democrats	Vickie Lantry	226	0.5	+0.5
Total formal votes		42,822	98.0	−0.3
Informal votes		871	2.0	+0.3
Turnout		43,693	92.3	
Two-party-preferred result
National	John Turner	19,832	65.4	+2.5
Labor	Lisa Clancy	10,471	34.6	−2.5
National hold		Swing	+2.5	

=== Newcastle ===
2003 New South Wales state election: Newcastle
Party	Candidate	Votes	%	±%
Labor	Bryce Gaudry	19,139	48.0	−5.1
Liberal	David Parker	10,654	26.7	+6.6
Greens	Ian McKenzie	6,054	15.2	+5.2
Independent	Harry Williams	1,427	3.6	+3.6
One Nation	Gladys Gander	960	2.4	−6.1
Democrats	Brett Paterson	885	2.2	−2.2
Christian Democrats	Elaine Battersby	652	1.6	+1.6
Unity	Nawal Sami	89	0.2	+0.0
Total formal votes		39,860	97.3	−0.1
Informal votes		1,109	2.7	+0.1
Turnout		40,969	90.7	
Two-party-preferred result
Labor	Bryce Gaudry	22,200	64.8	−7.6
Liberal	David Parker	12,035	35.2	+7.6
Labor hold		Swing	−7.6	

=== North Shore ===
2003 New South Wales state election: North Shore
Party	Candidate	Votes	%	±%
Liberal	Jillian Skinner	19,865	50.3	−3.6
Labor	Tabitha Winton	9,825	24.9	−3.0
Greens	Ted Nixon	6,116	15.5	+8.5
Independent	Jim Reid	2,560	6.5	+6.5
Democrats	Allen Frick	649	1.6	−6.4
Unity	Xiaogang Zhang	512	1.3	+1.3
Total formal votes		40,160	98.4	+0.2
Informal votes		633	1.6	−0.2
Turnout		40,160	87.0	
Two-party-preferred result
Liberal	Jillian Skinner	21,559	62.3	+0.0
Labor	Tabitha Winton	13,052	37.7	-0.0
Liberal hold		Swing	+0.0	

=== Northern Tablelands ===
2003 New South Wales state election: Northern Tablelands
Party	Candidate	Votes	%	±%
Independent	Richard Torbay	28,149	71.3	+27.1
National	Peter Bailey	6,076	15.4	−18.7
Labor	Michaela Fogarty	1,870	4.7	−4.5
Greens	Brendon Perrin	1,632	4.1	+2.3
Christian Democrats	Isabel Strutt	829	2.1	+2.1
Independent	John Irvine	457	1.2	+1.2
One Nation	James Donald	455	1.2	−5.9
Total formal votes		39,468	99.0	+0.2
Informal votes		414	1.0	−0.2
Turnout		39,882	93.0	
Notional two-party-preferred count
National	Peter Bailey	9,382	60.9	−6.8
Labor	Michaela Fogarty	6,029	39.1	+6.8
Two-candidate-preferred result
Independent	Richard Torbay	30,691	82.4	+23.0
National	Peter Bailey	6,569	17.6	−23.0
Independent hold		Swing	+23.0	

=== Orange ===
2003 New South Wales state election: Orange
Party	Candidate	Votes	%	±%
National	Russell Turner	18,418	45.3	+3.7
Labor	Glenn Taylor	13,484	33.1	+0.8
Independent	Peter Hetherington	5,864	14.4	+14.4
Greens	Jeremy Buckingham	1,709	4.2	+1.1
Christian Democrats	Bruce McLean	1,217	3.0	−0.3
Total formal votes		40,692	98.0	+0.0
Informal votes		831	2.0	−0.0
Turnout		41,523	93.7	
Two-party-preferred result
National	Russell Turner	20,690	57.1	+0.8
Labor	Glenn Taylor	15,565	42.9	−0.8
National hold		Swing	+0.8	

=== Oxley ===
2003 New South Wales state election: Oxley
Party	Candidate	Votes	%	±%
National	Andrew Stoner	21,855	53.9	+17.6
Labor	Gerard Hayes	13,366	33.0	+8.6
Greens	Jeremy Bradley	3,379	8.3	+4.5
One Nation	Helen Fearn	1,951	4.8	−14.0
Total formal votes		40,551	97.9	−0.2
Informal votes		891	2.1	+0.2
Turnout		41,442	93.1	
Two-party-preferred result
National	Andrew Stoner	22,808	60.0	+2.0
Labor	Gerard Hayes	15,237	40.0	−2.0
National hold		Swing	+2.0	

=== Parramatta ===
2003 New South Wales state election: Parramatta
Party	Candidate	Votes	%	±%
Labor	Tanya Gadiel	19,761	49.9	−3.7
Liberal	Chiang Lim	11,049	27.9	−2.1
Greens	Doug Williamson	2,836	7.2	+4.5
Independent	Lorraine Wearne	1,688	4.3	+4.3
Unity	Ernest Chan	1,502	3.8	+0.2
Christian Democrats	Michael Horgan	1,266	3.2	+3.2
One Nation	Daniel Mullins	597	1.5	−3.4
Democrats	Tony Yoo	593	1.5	−1.7
Independent	Les Vance	313	0.8	+0.8
Total formal votes		39,605	97.2	−0.2
Informal votes		1,152	2.8	+0.2
Turnout		40,757	90.3	
Two-party-preferred result
Labor	Tanya Gadiel	21,996	63.4	−1.1
Liberal	Chiang Lim	12,682	36.6	+1.1
Labor hold		Swing	−1.1	

=== Peats ===
2003 New South Wales state election: Peats
Party	Candidate	Votes	%	±%
Labor	Marie Andrews	18,180	43.9	−6.0
Liberal	Debra Wales	11,620	28.1	−3.2
Independent	Chris Holstein	7,582	18.3	+18.3
Greens	Vicki Brooke	2,028	4.9	+2.0
AAFI	John Goldsmith	643	1.6	+0.5
Independent	Peter Moore	547	1.3	+1.3
Save Our Suburbs	Mark Ellis	513	1.2	+1.2
Democrats	Geoff Ward	306	0.7	−3.2
Total formal votes		41,419	97.8	+0.3
Informal votes		936	2.2	−0.3
Turnout		42,355	93.2	
Two-party-preferred result
Labor	Marie Andrews	21,181	59.7	−1.6
Liberal	Debra Wales	14,289	40.3	+1.6
Labor hold		Swing	−1.6	

=== Penrith ===
2003 New South Wales state election: Penrith
Party	Candidate	Votes	%	±%
Labor	Karyn Paluzzano	18,354	45.9	−7.4
Liberal	Jim Aitken	14,368	35.9	+10.7
Greens	Lesley Edwards	2,429	6.1	+3.0
Christian Democrats	Kenneth Nathan	1,199	3.0	−0.5
One Nation	Judith Dansie	890	2.2	−6.5
Independent	Kevin Crameri	826	2.1	+2.1
Save Our Suburbs	Barbie Bates	778	1.9	+1.9
AAFI	Ian Gelling	601	1.5	+0.6
Democrats	Geraldine Waters	353	0.9	−1.4
Independent	Mitch Arvidson	158	0.4	+0.4
Unity	Li Cai	72	0.2	+0.2
Total formal votes		40,028	97.0	+0.0
Informal votes		1,238	3.0	−0.0
Turnout		41,266	92.5	
Two-party-preferred result
Labor	Karyn Paluzzano	19,951	56.1	−10.6
Liberal	Jim Aitken	15,618	43.9	+10.6
Labor hold		Swing	−10.6	

=== Pittwater ===
2003 New South Wales state election: Pittwater
Party	Candidate	Votes	%	±%
Liberal	John Brogden	24,601	60.3	+8.3
Labor	Ben Carpentier	7,738	19.0	−0.7
Greens	Hunter Walters	5,749	14.1	+7.6
Christian Democrats	Andrew Amos	1,150	2.8	+0.1
Democrats	Jane Rowe	897	2.2	−9.5
AAFI	George Atkinson	579	1.4	+0.3
Unity	Hue Lee	103	0.3	+0.3
Total formal votes		40,817	98.1	+0.2
Informal votes		805	1.9	−0.2
Turnout		41,622	91.2	
Two-party-preferred result
Liberal	John Brogden	26,065	70.1	+1.3
Labor	Ben Carpentier	11,110	29.9	−1.3
Liberal hold		Swing	+1.3	

=== Port Jackson ===
2003 New South Wales state election: Port Jackson
Party	Candidate	Votes	%	±%
Labor	Sandra Nori	18,763	42.1	−11.8
Greens	Jamie Parker	12,856	28.9	+21.0
Liberal	Nick Dyer	9,182	20.6	+2.2
Unity	Polly Chan	1,538	3.5	+3.5
Democrats	Simon Glastonbury	1,027	2.3	−5.2
Fishing Party	Victor Shen	649	1.5	+1.5
Socialist Alliance	Paul Benedek	541	1.2	+1.2
Total formal votes		44,556	97.8	+1.2
Informal votes		1,000	2.2	−1.2
Turnout		45,556	86.4	
Notional two-party-preferred count
Labor	Sandra Nori	24,193	68.0	−7.1
Liberal	Nick Dyer	11,379	32.0	+7.1
Two-candidate-preferred result
Labor	Sandra Nori	19,713	57.3	−17.8
Greens	Jamie Parker	14,676	42.7	+42.7
Labor hold		Swing	−17.8	

=== Port Macquarie ===
2003 New South Wales state election: Port Macquarie
Party	Candidate	Votes	%	±%
Independent	Rob Oakeshott	30,659	69.8	+69.8
National	Charlie Fenton	6,416	14.6	−41.4
Labor	Robert Hough	3,697	8.4	−18.6
Greens	Susie Russell	1,599	3.6	+0.6
Christian Democrats	Kerry Medway	1,122	2.6	+2.6
AAFI	James McLeod	321	0.7	−0.8
Independent	Graeme Muldoon	141	0.3	+0.3
Total formal votes		43,955	98.8	+0.3
Informal votes		556	1.2	−0.3
Turnout		44,511	94.1	
Notional two-party-preferred count
National	Charlie Fenton	9,411	55.3	−11.3
Labor	Robert Hough	7,603	44.7	+11.3
Two-candidate-preferred result
Independent	Rob Oakeshott	34,146	82.8	+82.8
National	Charlie Fenton	7,079	17.2	−49.4
Member changed to Independent from National		Swing	N/A	

=== Port Stephens ===
2003 New South Wales state election: Port Stephens
Party	Candidate	Votes	%	±%
Labor	John Bartlett	21,308	49.7	+4.0
Liberal	Sally Dover	14,811	34.5	+34.5
Greens	Tom Griffiths	2,974	6.9	+1.4
Independent	Tony King	1,164	2.7	+1.6
One Nation	Paul Fuller	1,047	2.4	−10.6
Democrats	Felicity Boyd	828	1.9	−1.4
Christian Democrats	Brian Milton	776	1.8	−3.0
Total formal votes		42,908	97.4	−0.4
Informal votes		1,150	2.6	+0.4
Turnout		44,058	92.8	
Two-party-preferred result
Labor	John Bartlett	23,129	59.3	−3.0
Liberal	Sally Dover	15,845	40.7	+40.7
Labor hold		Swing	−3.0	

=== Riverstone ===
2003 New South Wales state election: Riverstone
Party	Candidate	Votes	%	±%
Labor	John Aquilina	27,450	57.1	+2.2
Liberal	Ray Williams	13,531	28.2	+2.6
Christian Democrats	Greg Tan	2,174	4.5	+4.5
Greens	Sheryl Jarecki	2,087	4.3	+0.7
Democrats	Tom Peacock	1,109	2.3	−2.2
One Nation	Paul Cluderay	868	1.8	−7.6
AAFI	Norm Parsons	828	1.7	−0.3
Total formal votes		48,047	97.0	−0.2
Informal votes		1,504	3.0	+0.2
Turnout		49,551	93.3	
Two-party-preferred result
Labor	John Aquilina	29,176	66.1	−1.1
Liberal	Ray Williams	14,994	33.9	+1.1
Labor hold		Swing	−1.1	

=== Rockdale ===
2003 New South Wales state election: Rockdale
Party	Candidate	Votes	%	±%
Labor	Frank Sartor	19,122	49.1	−6.8
Liberal	Jan Brennan	9,205	23.6	−4.0
Independent	Kevin Ryan	3,653	9.4	+9.4
Greens	Lesa De Leau	2,510	6.4	+3.4
Independent	Mahmoud Ghalayini	1,275	3.3	+3.3
Independent	John Nikolovski	795	2.0	+2.0
Christian Democrats	Stephen Winter	747	1.9	+1.9
Unity	Cong Tran	674	1.7	+1.7
AAFI	Thomas Foley	378	1.0	+0.1
Save Our Suburbs	Mark Curran	335	0.9	+0.9
Democrats	Eoin Coghlan	240	0.6	−2.1
Total formal votes		38,934	96.1	+0.0
Informal votes		1,600	3.9	−0.0
Turnout		40,534	92.2	
Two-party-preferred result
Labor	Frank Sartor	21,139	65.9	−0.6
Liberal	Jan Brennan	10,938	34.1	+0.6
Labor hold		Swing	−0.6	

=== Ryde ===
2003 New South Wales state election: Ryde
Party	Candidate	Votes	%	±%
Labor	John Watkins	22,499	54.8	+10.7
Liberal	Paul Nicolaou	12,500	30.4	−3.2
Greens	Jimmy Shaw	2,934	7.1	+4.4
Unity	Lawrence Chan	1,400	3.4	+0.3
Christian Democrats	David Collins	1,030	2.5	+2.5
Democrats	Chris Owens	731	1.8	−2.0
Total formal votes		41,094	97.7	+0.5
Informal votes		946	2.3	−0.5
Turnout		42,040	92.4	
Two-party-preferred result
Labor	John Watkins	25,278	65.5	+8.9
Liberal	Paul Nicolaou	13,289	34.5	−8.9
Labor hold		Swing	+8.9	

=== Smithfield ===
2003 New South Wales state election: Smithfield
Party	Candidate	Votes	%	±%
Labor	Carl Scully	27,499	67.3	+5.0
Liberal	Essam Benjamin	7,459	18.3	−3.7
Greens	Johnn Fonseca	2,006	4.9	+1.8
Christian Democrats	Manny Poularas	1,282	3.1	−0.2
Unity	Steve Chung	1,196	2.9	+2.9
One Nation	Gerald Cluderay	772	1.9	−3.9
Democrats	David Holloway	626	1.5	−0.9
Total formal votes		40,840	95.8	−0.7
Informal votes		1,784	4.2	+0.7
Turnout		42,624	92.9	
Two-party-preferred result
Labor	Carl Scully	28,665	77.8	+5.0
Liberal	Essam Benjamin	8,203	22.2	−5.0
Labor hold		Swing	+5.0	

=== South Coast ===
2003 New South Wales state election: South Coast
Party	Candidate	Votes	%	±%
Liberal	Shelley Hancock	17,230	38.6	−1.3
Labor	Wayne Smith	15,357	34.4	−5.8
Independent	Barry McCaffery	4,043	9.1	+9.1
Independent	Greg Watson	3,053	6.8	+6.8
Greens	Jane Bange	2,549	5.7	+0.6
Christian Democrats	Steve Ryan	1,269	2.8	−0.5
Independent	Pam Arnold	646	1.4	+1.4
One Nation	Carmelo Savoca	499	1.1	−9.3
Total formal votes		44,646	98.0	−0.2
Informal votes		927	2.0	+0.2
Turnout		45,573	93.0	
Two-party-preferred result
Liberal	Shelley Hancock	20,438	52.8	+3.3
Labor	Wayne Smith	18,287	47.2	−3.3
Liberal gain from Labor		Swing	+3.3	

=== Southern Highlands ===
2003 New South Wales state election: Southern Highlands
Party	Candidate	Votes	%	±%
Liberal	Peta Seaton	22,729	52.4	+8.0
Labor	Noeline Brown	15,280	35.2	+1.1
Greens	Jim Clark	3,726	8.6	+4.4
One Nation	Nathan McDonald	1,128	2.6	−7.6
Independent	Jean McClung	542	1.2	+1.2
Total formal votes		43,405	97.9	+0.0
Informal votes		931	2.1	−0.0
Turnout		44,336	93.6	
Two-party-preferred result
Liberal	Peta Seaton	23,789	57.6	+1.9
Labor	Noeline Brown	17,488	42.4	−1.9
Liberal hold		Swing	+1.9	

=== Strathfield ===
2003 New South Wales state election: Strathfield
Party	Candidate	Votes	%	±%
Labor	Virginia Judge	21,056	51.1	+6.3
Liberal	Joe Tannous	11,964	29.0	−4.2
Greens	Mary Hawkins	4,248	10.3	+7.0
Unity	Alfred Tsang	2,566	6.2	+0.7
Independent	Morris Mansour	695	1.7	+1.7
Democrats	Anna Garrett	675	1.6	−2.8
Total formal votes		41,204	97.4	+0.4
Informal votes		1,090	2.6	−0.4
Turnout		42,294	90.8	
Two-party-preferred result
Labor	Virginia Judge	24,702	65.8	+7.4
Liberal	Joe Tannous	12,853	34.2	−7.4
Labor hold		Swing	+7.4	

=== Swansea ===
2003 New South Wales state election: Swansea
Party	Candidate	Votes	%	±%
Labor	Milton Orkopoulos	24,144	55.9	+4.7
Liberal	Dell Tschanter	12,679	29.4	+5.9
Greens	Charmian Eckersley	2,857	6.6	+1.7
Democrats	Peter Lee	1,312	3.0	−1.0
AAFI	John Ingram	900	2.1	+2.1
One Nation	James Flowers	889	2.1	−11.1
Save Our Suburbs	Anthony Meaney	380	0.9	+0.9
Total formal votes		43,161	97.5	−0.3
Informal votes		1,116	2.5	+0.3
Turnout		44,277	93.5	
Two-party-preferred result
Labor	Milton Orkopoulos	25,902	65.9	−0.7
Liberal	Dell Tschanter	13,406	34.1	+0.7
Labor hold		Swing	−0.7	

=== Tamworth ===
2003 New South Wales state election: Tamworth
Party	Candidate	Votes	%	±%
Independent	Peter Draper	16,630	40.0	+40.0
National	John Cull	16,235	39.1	+27.5
Labor	Ray Tait	4,949	11.9	−0.5
Christian Democrats	Neville Mammen	1,901	4.6	+4.6
Greens	Chris Valentine	799	1.9	+1.9
One Nation	Terry Dwyer	700	1.7	−5.0
Independent	Richard Witten	320	0.8	+0.8
Total formal votes		41,534	98.5	−0.2
Informal votes		621	1.5	+0.2
Turnout		42,155	94.2	
Notional two-party-preferred count
National	John Cull	20,069	69.9	+15.2
Labor	Ray Tait	8,637	30.1	−15.2
Two-candidate-preferred result
Independent	Peter Draper	19,542	52.5	
National	John Cull	17,692	47.5	
Independent gain from Independent		Swing	N/A	

Tony Windsor (Independent) resigned in 2001 and John Cull (National) won the seat at the resulting by-election.

=== The Entrance ===
2003 New South Wales state election: The Entrance
Party	Candidate	Votes	%	±%
Labor	Grant McBride	21,763	52.1	+4.8
Liberal	Phil Walker	14,920	35.7	+8.1
Greens	Gwen Parry-Jones	2,362	5.7	+3.4
Christian Democrats	Steve Wood	866	2.1	+0.0
AAFI	Garry Oates	548	1.3	+0.5
Democrats	Carolyn Hastie	496	1.2	−1.6
One Nation	Peter Chermak	465	1.1	−5.8
Save Our Suburbs	Bryan Ellis	327	0.8	+0.8
Total formal votes		41,747	97.8	+0.0
Informal votes		929	2.2	−0.0
Turnout		42,676	92.3	
Two-party-preferred result
Labor	Grant McBride	23,118	59.6	−0.1
Liberal	Phil Walker	15,700	40.4	+0.1
Labor hold		Swing	−0.1	

=== The Hills ===
2003 New South Wales state election: The Hills
Party	Candidate	Votes	%	±%
Liberal	Michael Richardson	25,574	50.4	−0.7
Labor	Anthony Ellard	14,488	28.6	+3.3
Greens	Jocelyn Howden	3,289	6.5	+3.8
Independent	Rob Stanton	2,368	4.7	+4.7
Christian Democrats	Ken Gregory	2,293	4.5	−0.8
Unity	Robert McLeod	1,441	2.8	−1.2
AAFI	Albert Dowman	650	1.3	+0.3
Democrats	Kamran Keshavarz Talebi	619	1.2	−5.7
Total formal votes		50,722	98.0	+0.2
Informal votes		1,041	2.0	−0.2
Turnout		51,763	92.2	
Two-party-preferred result
Liberal	Michael Richardson	27,536	61.6	−3.1
Labor	Anthony Ellard	17,174	38.4	+3.1
Liberal hold		Swing	−3.1	

=== Tweed ===
2003 New South Wales state election: Tweed
Party	Candidate	Votes	%	±%
Labor	Neville Newell	19,479	44.3	+0.1
National	Sue Vinnicombe	18,241	41.5	+0.8
Greens	Tom Tabart	3,854	8.8	+3.8
Fishing Party	Ned Kelly	1,153	2.6	+2.6
One Nation	Trent Burston	647	1.5	+1.5
Democrats	Casey Balk	557	1.3	−1.1
Total formal votes		43,931	98.1	+0.1
Informal votes		859	1.9	−0.1
Turnout		44,790	89.8	
Two-party-preferred result
Labor	Neville Newell	22,149	53.8	+1.2
National	Sue Vinnicombe	19,001	46.2	−1.2
Labor hold		Swing	+1.2	

=== Upper Hunter ===
2003 New South Wales state election: Upper Hunter
Party	Candidate	Votes	%	±%
National	George Souris	21,251	55.1	+5.9
Labor	Chris Connor	12,310	31.9	+0.2
Greens	Neil Strachan	2,285	5.9	+2.9
Independent	Steven Lawler	1,420	3.7	+3.7
One Nation	David Churches	1,332	3.5	−9.3
Total formal votes		38,598	96.1	+0.0
Informal votes		748	1.9	−0.0
Turnout		39,346	93.3	
Two-party-preferred result
National	George Souris	22,446	62.7	+2.2
Labor	Chris Connor	13,345	37.3	−2.2
National hold		Swing	+2.2	

=== Vaucluse ===
2003 New South Wales state election: Vaucluse
Party	Candidate	Votes	%	±%
Liberal	Peter Debnam	19,735	54.4	+0.6
Labor	Alice Salomon	9,667	26.6	−0.6
Greens	Rory O'Gorman	6,463	17.8	+7.7
Unity	Teck Yong	441	1.2	+1.2
Total formal votes		36,306	97.8	+0.0
Informal votes		826	2.2	−0.0
Turnout		37,132	85.6	
Two-party-preferred result
Liberal	Peter Debnam	20,333	60.3	−2.2
Labor	Alice Salomon	13,407	39.7	+2.2
Liberal hold		Swing	−2.2	

=== Wagga Wagga ===
2003 New South Wales state election: Wagga Wagga
Party	Candidate	Votes	%	±%
Liberal	Daryl Maguire	23,530	58.9	+33.5
Labor	Col McPherson	12,645	31.7	+5.4
Greens	Jim Rees	2,259	5.7	+5.7
One Nation	Daniel Chermak	761	1.9	−6.1
Democrats	Rex Graham	725	1.8	−0.9
Total formal votes		39,920	98.0	−0.2
Informal votes		798	2.0	+0.2
Turnout		40,718	92.1	
Two-party-preferred result
Liberal	Daryl Maguire	24,162	63.7	+6.2
Labor	Col McPherson	13,749	36.3	−6.2
Liberal hold		Swing	+6.2	

=== Wakehurst ===
2003 New South Wales state election: Wakehurst
Party	Candidate	Votes	%	±%
Liberal	Brad Hazzard	18,584	47.2	−1.2
Labor	Chris Sharpe	9,416	23.9	−4.9
Independent	Vincent De Luca	4,485	11.4	+11.4
Greens	Peter Forrest	3,997	10.1	+3.5
Christian Democrats	Mike Hubbard	1,206	3.1	+3.1
Unity	Rita Lee	591	1.5	+1.5
AAFI	Anthony Mavin	591	1.5	−1.4
Democrats	Tony Howells	527	1.3	−5.2
Total formal votes		39,397	96.6	−0.4
Informal votes		1,387	3.4	+0.4
Turnout		40,784	91.2	
Two-party-preferred result
Liberal	Brad Hazzard	20,542	62.7	+1.9
Labor	Chris Sharpe	12,230	37.3	−1.9
Liberal hold		Swing	+1.9	

=== Wallsend ===
2003 New South Wales state election: Wallsend
Party	Candidate	Votes	%	±%
Labor	John Mills	24,935	56.8	−0.7
Liberal	David Williams	9,739	22.2	+2.7
Greens	Michael Osborne	3,854	8.8	+1.9
Independent	Di Gibson	1,684	3.8	+3.8
One Nation	Edna Phillips	1,453	3.3	−8.2
Christian Democrats	Jim Kendall	1,259	2.9	−1.2
Democrats	Sharyn Csanki	950	2.2	+2.2
Total formal votes		43,874	96.9	−0.6
Informal votes		1,381	3.1	+0.6
Turnout		45,255	94.1	
Two-party-preferred result
Labor	John Mills	27,396	70.7	−1.9
Liberal	David Williams	11,350	29.3	+1.9
Labor hold		Swing	−1.9	

=== Wentworthville ===
2003 New South Wales state election: Wentworthville
Party	Candidate	Votes	%	±%
Labor	Pam Allan	21,744	54.8	+2.3
Liberal	Brett Murray	11,746	29.6	+2.3
Greens	Darren Reader	1,926	4.9	+2.2
Christian Democrats	Sam Baissari	1,728	4.4	−0.1
AAFI	Lyndon Shepherd	1,235	3.1	+1.8
Unity	Cynthia Su	813	2.0	−0.4
Democrats	Ian Swallow	506	1.3	−1.5
Total formal votes		39,698	96.8	+0.1
Informal votes		1,292	3.2	−0.1
Turnout		40,990	93.1	
Two-party-preferred result
Labor	Pam Allan	23,664	64.8	−0.6
Liberal	Brett Murray	12,866	35.2	+0.6
Labor hold		Swing	−0.6	

=== Willoughby ===
2003 New South Wales state election: Willoughby
Party	Candidate	Votes	%	±%
Liberal	Gladys Berejiklian	14,944	36.3	−14.5
Independent	Pat Reilly	10,237	24.8	+24.8
Labor	Imogen Wareing	8,703	21.1	−7.0
Greens	Mike Steel	4,361	10.6	+5.4
Unity	Sylvia Chao	1,595	3.9	−0.6
Christian Democrats	Leighton Thew	562	1.4	+1.4
Democrats	Caroline Mayfield	557	1.4	−6.2
Independent	Robert Butler	242	0.6	+0.6
Total formal votes		41,201	98.2	+0.5
Informal votes		769	1.8	−0.5
Turnout		41,970	89.3	
Notional two-party-preferred count
Liberal	Gladys Berejiklian	17,452	57.4	−3.7
Labor	Imogen Wareing	12,960	42.6	+3.7
Two-candidate-preferred result
Liberal	Gladys Berejiklian	16,607	50.2	−10.9
Independent	Pat Reilly	16,463	49.8	+49.8
Liberal hold		Swing	−10.9	

=== Wollongong ===
2003 New South Wales state election: Wollongong
Party	Candidate	Votes	%	±%
Labor	Noreen Hay	18,388	47.8	−14.9
Independent	Anne Wood	5,609	14.6	+14.6
Independent	David Moulds	4,578	11.9	+11.9
Greens	Meredith Henderson	4,319	11.2	+4.7
Liberal	George Pride	3,518	9.2	−6.4
Christian Democrats	Phil Latz	1,024	2.7	−0.9
AAFI	David Hughes	796	2.1	−1.1
Unity	Van Mach	198	0.5	−1.2
Total formal votes		38,430	96.0	−0.7
Informal votes		1,607	4.0	+0.7
Turnout		40,037	92.4	
Notional two-party-preferred count
Labor	Noreen Hay	24,367	77.7	−1.0
Liberal	George Pride	6,984	22.3	+1.0
Two-candidate-preferred result
Labor	Noreen Hay	20,913	67.3	−11.4
Independent	Anne Wood	10,170	32.7	+32.7
Labor hold		Swing	−11.4	

=== Wyong ===
2003 New South Wales state election: Wyong
Party	Candidate	Votes	%	±%
Labor	Paul Crittenden	24,644	53.8	−0.3
Liberal	Ben Morton	15,610	34.1	+7.2
Greens	Scott Rickard	2,229	4.9	+4.9
Christian Democrats	Gerda Hailes	1,138	2.5	−0.4
One Nation	Joanne May	688	1.5	−8.1
AAFI	Joyce Moylan	650	1.4	−0.3
Independent	Dianne Smith-Di Francesco	425	0.9	+0.9
Democrats	Christopher Stennett	409	0.9	−2.0
Total formal votes		45,793	97.7	+0.1
Informal votes		1,091	2.3	−0.1
Turnout		46,884	93.2	
Two-party-preferred result
Labor	Paul Crittenden	25,810	61.1	−4.4
Liberal	Ben Morton	16,443	38.9	+4.4
Labor hold		Swing	−4.4	

== See also ==
- Candidates of the 2003 New South Wales state election
- Members of the New South Wales Legislative Assembly, 2003–2007
