= Electoral results for the district of Londonderry =

Election results for Londonderry, New South Wales, Australia

Londonderry, an electoral district of the Legislative Assembly in the Australian state of New South Wales, was created in 1988 and has generally been held by the Labor Party.

== Members for Londonderry ==
Election	Member	Party
1988	Paul Gibson	Labor
1991	Paul Gibson	Labor
1995	Paul Gibson	Labor
1999	Jim Anderson	Labor
2003	Allan Shearan	Labor
2007	Allan Shearan	Labor
2011	Bart Bassett	Liberal
2015	Prue Car	Labor
2019	Prue Car	Labor
2023	Prue Car	Labor

== Election results ==
=== Elections in the 2020s ===
==== 2023 ====
2023 New South Wales state election: Londonderry
Party	Candidate	Votes	%	±%
Labor	Prue Car	28,079	54.3	+8.0
Liberal	Samantha Talakola	15,525	30.0	−11.4
One Nation	Luke Tester	4,228	8.2	+8.2
Greens	David Maurice	2,611	5.0	+0.4
Sustainable Australia	David Bowen	1,282	2.5	−1.3
Total formal votes		51,725	96.2	+0.8
Informal votes		2,061	3.8	−0.8
Turnout		53,786	87.5	+4.6
Two-party-preferred result
Labor	Prue Car	30,145	63.7	+10.7
Liberal	Samantha Talakola	17,164	36.3	−10.7
Labor hold		Swing	+10.7	

=== Elections in the 2010s ===
==== 2019 ====
2019 New South Wales state election: Londonderry
Party	Candidate	Votes	%	±%
Labor	Prue Car	25,809	48.99	−1.85
Liberal	Belinda Hill	20,066	38.09	+2.12
Greens	Charlie Pierce	2,650	5.03	+0.18
Sustainable Australia	David Bowen	2,206	4.19	+4.19
Christian Democrats	Don Modarelli	1,955	3.71	−1.36
Total formal votes		52,686	95.04	+0.41
Informal votes		2,749	4.96	−0.41
Turnout		55,435	86.83	−2.15
Two-party-preferred result
Labor	Prue Car	27,442	56.46	−2.37
Liberal	Belinda Hill	21,163	43.54	+2.37
Labor hold		Swing	−2.37	

==== 2015 ====
2015 New South Wales state election: Londonderry
Party	Candidate	Votes	%	±%
Labor	Prue Car	23,359	50.8	+13.7
Liberal	Bernard Bratusa	16,523	36.0	−10.8
Christian Democrats	Maurice Girotto	2,332	5.1	+0.6
Greens	Shane Gorman	2,229	4.9	−1.6
No Land Tax	Joe Arduca	1,503	3.3	+3.3
Total formal votes		45,946	94.6	−0.1
Informal votes		2,607	5.4	+0.1
Turnout		48,553	89.0	+0.6
Two-party-preferred result
Labor	Prue Car	24,889	58.8	+14.2
Liberal	Bernard Bratusa	17,420	41.2	−14.2
Labor gain from Liberal		Swing	+14.2	

==== 2011 ====
2011 New South Wales state election: Londonderry
Party	Candidate	Votes	%	±%
Liberal	Bart Bassett	22,489	52.7	+18.3
Labor	Allan Shearan	12,953	30.4	−17.2
Greens	Peta Holmes	3,257	7.6	+1.0
Family First	Steven Said	1,992	4.7	+4.7
Christian Democrats	Caroline Fraser	1,955	4.6	−2.1
Total formal votes		42,646	96.1	0.0
Informal votes		1,752	3.9	0.0
Turnout		44,398	93.2	
Two-party-preferred result
Liberal	Bart Bassett	24,149	62.3	+19.2
Labor	Allan Shearan	14,621	37.7	−19.2
Liberal gain from Labor		Swing	+19.2	

=== Elections in the 2000s ===
==== 2007 ====
2007 New South Wales state election: Londonderry
Party	Candidate	Votes	%	±%
Labor	Allan Shearan	19,288	47.5	+0.8
Liberal	Bart Bassett	13,957	34.4	+26.0
Greens	Joel Macrae	2,708	6.7	−0.8
Christian Democrats	John Phillips	2,694	6.6	+2.2
AAFI	Ross Dedman	1,936	4.8	−0.6
Total formal votes		40,583	96.1	−0.8
Informal votes		1,655	3.9	+0.8
Turnout		42,238	93.1	
Two-party-preferred result
Labor	Allan Shearan	20,936	56.9	−4.0
Liberal	Bart Bassett	15,834	43.1	+4.0
Labor hold		Swing	−4.0	

==== 2003 ====
2003 New South Wales state election: Londonderry (supplementary)
Party	Candidate	Votes	%	±%
Labor	Allan Shearan	17,284	52.3	+3.3
Independent	Boyd Falconer	7,800	23.6	+23.6
Greens	Allan Quinn	2,388	7.2	+3.8
AAFI	Janey Woodger	2,097	6.3	+4.8
Christian Democrats	John Phillips	1,890	5.7	+2.1
One Nation	Col Easton	1,041	3.1	−8.0
Independent	Norman Hooper	570	1.7	+1.7
Total formal votes		33,070	96.5	+0.1
Informal votes		1,210	3.5	−0.1
Turnout		34,280	77.2	
Two-candidate-preferred result
Labor	Allan Shearan	18,073	65.3	+0.4
Independent	Boyd Falconer	9,621	34.7	+34.7
Labor hold		Swing	+0.4	

=== Elections in the 1990s ===
==== 1999 ====
1999 New South Wales state election: Londonderry
Party	Candidate	Votes	%	±%
Labor	Jim Anderson	19,369	49.0	−6.6
Liberal	Kevin Conolly	9,877	25.0	−8.7
One Nation	Stephen Burke	4,406	11.1	+11.1
Christian Democrats	John Phillips	1,407	3.6	+1.7
Greens	Ross Kingsley	1,341	3.4	+3.4
Democrats	Jim Cassidy	1,305	3.3	−3.5
Independent	Dion Bailey	1,026	2.6	+2.6
AAFI	Lachlan Gelling	611	1.5	+1.5
Non-Custodial Parents	Allan Holmes	185	0.5	+0.5
Total formal votes		39,527	96.4	+2.8
Informal votes		1,494	3.6	−2.8
Turnout		41,021	92.7	
Two-party-preferred result
Labor	Jim Anderson	21,145	64.9	+3.3
Liberal	Kevin Conolly	11,436	35.1	−3.3
Labor hold		Swing	+3.3	

==== 1995 ====
1995 New South Wales state election: Londonderry
Party	Candidate	Votes	%	±%
Labor	Paul Gibson	21,724	60.4	−3.7
Liberal	Vern McKenzie	10,869	30.2	−5.8
Citizens Opinion Law Order	Phillip Smith	1,994	5.5	+5.5
Call to Australia	Ian Rains	1,404	3.9	+3.9
Total formal votes		35,991	93.1	+15.3
Informal votes		2,679	6.9	−15.3
Turnout		38,670	92.9	
Two-party-preferred result
Labor	Paul Gibson	22,754	65.3	+1.3
Liberal	Vern McKenzie	12,093	34.7	−1.3
Labor hold		Swing	+1.3	

==== 1991 ====
1991 New South Wales state election: Londonderry
Party	Candidate	Votes	%	±%
Labor	Paul Gibson	17,136	64.0	+14.0
Liberal	Cheryle Symonds	9,632	36.0	−1.9
Total formal votes		26,768	77.8	−17.0
Informal votes		7,655	22.2	+17.0
Turnout		34,423	92.8	
Labor hold		Swing	+9.3	

=== Elections in the 1980s ===
==== 1988 ====
1988 New South Wales state election: Londonderry
Party	Candidate	Votes	%	±%
Labor	Paul Gibson	12,651	47.1	−11.2
Liberal	Geoffrey Saunders	10,074	37.5	−3.1
Independent	Desmond Wilson	4,136	15.4	+15.4
Total formal votes		26,861	94.5	−1.8
Informal votes		1,573	5.5	+1.8
Turnout		28,434	92.3	
Two-party-preferred result
Labor	Paul Gibson	13,330	53.0	−5.9
Liberal	Geoffrey Saunders	11,799	47.0	+5.9
Labor notional hold		Swing	−5.9	
