= 1990 Macquarie Fields state by-election =

Election result for Macquarie Fields, New South Wales, Australia

A by-election was held in the state electoral district of Macquarie Fields on 3 November 1990. The by-election was triggered by the resignation of Stan Knowles (Labor), who was facing minor shop lifting charges.

== Dates ==
Date	Event
11 October 1990	Stan Knowles resigned.
12 October 1990	Writ of election issued by the Speaker of the Legislative Assembly and close of electoral rolls.
18 October 1990	Day of nomination
3 November 1990	Polling day
23 November 1990	Return of writ

== Result ==
1990 Macquarie Fields by-election Saturday 3 November
Party	Candidate	Votes	%	±%
Labor	Craig Knowles	13,412	55.0	+9.6
Independent	Noel Short	7,543	30.9	+22.2
Democrats	Julian Connelly	3,450	14.1	+8.2
Total formal votes		24,405	95.9	
Informal votes		1,032	4.1	
Turnout		25,437	71.9	
Two-party-preferred result
Labor	Craig Knowles	14,134	60.4	+5.5
Independent	Noel Short	9,266	39.6	
Labor hold		Swing		

== See also ==
- Electoral results for the district of Macquarie Fields
- List of New South Wales state by-elections
