= Nola Fraser =

Australian political candidate

- Born: Nola Therese Fraser
- Occupation: Businessowner

Nola Therese Fraser (née Chalhoub) is an Australian small business owner, former Registered Nurse and former Liberal Party and Independent candidate for the New South Wales state seat of Macquarie Fields.

Fraser first rose to public prominence as one of the whistleblowers who made disclosures about the entrenched culture of substandard clinical practices and complicit management at Camden and Campbelltown Hospitals, that resulted in 21 avoidable deaths and other unnecessary injuries, sparking five major inquiries and the resignation and termination of a number of senior executive managers in the NSW health service.

== Role in the Macarthur Health Services scandal ==
Campbelltown and Camden Hospitals are two acute care hospitals (Campbelltown being the larger hospital) that provide extensive clinical services to residents of the Macarthur region (south-west Sydney) of New South Wales in Australia. Rapid population growth in the region, particularly from overseas immigration, during the 1990s and 2000s put increasing strain on Camden and Campbelltown Hospitals.

Despite this, Camden and Campbelltown Hospitals continuously failed to attract sufficient numbers of suitably qualified clinical staff, compared to other hospitals of the same size, to meet the increasing clinical demand. Political electoral sensitivities however continued to see Camden and Campbelltown Hospitals be pushed to not reduce or limit services, which created an environment of numerous clinical care safety risks that resulted in unnecessary adverse incidents, including 21 avoidable deaths, and a "sick hospital and administration system" that had "severely shaken... public confidence in New South Wales hospitals".

Between 1995 and 2002, a number of clinical staff – including Fraser, who was a Registered Nurse Unit Manager at Camden Hospital and member of the Critical Care Review Committee (an internal clinical safety governance body) – raised and reported numerous separate clinical safety incident reports to document deficiencies in and episodes of substandard clinical practice, that were met with indifference or hostility from hospital executive management, especially from the then General Manager Jennifer Collins (a former NSW Nurses and Midwives' Association trade union General Secretary who had gone on to be employed by the hospitals as General Manager since 1998 until her resignation and transfer in late 2003).

In October 2002, after sending the then chief executive officer of the South Western Sydney Area Health Service, Ian Southwell, details about the alleged mismanagement and misconduct at the Camden and Campbelltown Hospitals, Nora Fraser requested an appointment with then NSW Health Minister Craig Knowles.

On 5 November 2002 Nurses Valerie Owens, Sheree Martin, Yvonne Quinn and Fraser, accompanied by solicitor John Chalhoub, met with the then NSW Health Minister Craig Knowles as whistleblowers, detailing multiple episodes of substandard clinical practice that had resulted in patient death and injury, and ongoing failures of clinical governance processes at Camden and Campbelltown Hospitals, for which there had been systemic inaction by senior management to address, and for which retaliatory action, including intimidation, against those reporting such incidents had been occurring, including directly from the then General Manager Jennifer Collins.

This meeting resulted in the Director-General of the NSW Department of Health commissioning an internal investigation by the Departmental Director of Audit. On 18 November 2002, the Director-General of the NSW Department of Health, after considering the internal investigation report, referred 47 clinical care incidents that occurred between June 1999 and February 2003 to the New South Wales Health Care Complaints Commission. The New South Wales Health Care Complaints Commission published its final report on 9 December 2003, but a leaked interim draft copy was obtained by the media in September (two months earlier, which also prompted then NSW Heath Minister Morris Iemma to commission Professor Bruce Barraclough to conduct a separate review), which resulted in the sacking of the then chief executive officer of the South West Sydney Area Health Service, Ian Southwell, by then newly appointed NSW Health Minister Morris Iemma and the resignation of the then General Manager Jennifer Collins (who transferred to a lucrative six figure contract with the NSW Central Sydney Area Health Service, but was shortly thereafter sacked by Minister Morris Iemma from this role, albeit with a six figure termination payment).

While the New South Wales Health Care Complaints Commission found that "in some instances the [clinical] care was so poor that patients suffered serious deteriorations in health" (Part 1, p. 4) and that "disciplinary action" taken by the then General Manager Jennifer Collins against the whistleblowers "failed to properly apply relevant personnel policies... was not fair, impartial or complete... [and] many of the allegations had little or no basis... [and was intended] to discourage other staff from openly and actively raising concerns about clinical care" (Part 1, p. 5), the Commission did not recommend any prosecutorial or disciplinary action be directed at any individual. This omission was seen by the then newly appointed NSW Health Minister Morris Iemma as a failure of the Health Care Complaints Commission to discharge its statutory duties, leading him to sack the South West Sydney Area Health Services Board (which was responsible for supervising the management of the Camden and Campbelltown Hospitals) and the Health Care Complaints Commissioner, Amanda Adrian, stating on The 7.30 Report on 12 December 2003 that "The report, whilst it roared incompetence, it whispered solutions".

Meanwhile, commencing from February 2003, Fraser (and to a lesser extent Sharee Martin and Vanessa Bragg) had been actively putting pressure, together with the then New South Wales opposition leader, Liberal Party member John Brogden, on the then Premier of New South Wales Bob Carr and his government, through numerous media outlets, including on the Alan Jones radio program on broadcaster 2GB.

On 11 December 2003 Carr appointed Bret Walker as a Commissioner to conduct a Special Commission of Inquiry into Camden and Campbelltown Hospitals, followed by the separate announcements that the New South Wales Legislative Council would hold an "Inquiry into Complaints Handling within NSW Health" and that the NSW ICAC would open "Operation Jardine" to examine if any corrupt conduct had occurred.

On 24 June 2004, the NSW Legislative Council inquiry released its final report, with Inquiry Chairman Gordon Moyes stating that the medical mistakes and their cover-ups were a result of a system run by an "old girls' network" of administrators protected by their political affiliations and willingness to put the political motivations of their masters ahead of patient safety. The Inquiry committee singled out former General Manager Jennifer Collins for specific criticism, stating "The Committee is critical of former Macarthur Health Services General Manager Jennifer Collins and believes her management approach hindered efforts to bring forward complaints about health care" (paragraph 4.21) and found her evidence to the committee as lacking credibility, stating it was "evasive at best" (paragraph 4.19).

Ultimately though, despite five major inquiries, multiple findings of concern and numerous media coverage, no criminal or civil charges were laid, nor was any finding of corrupt conduct made (due to lack of evidence), on anyone involved. Camden and Campbelltown Hospitals did receive more funding however as a result of the scrutiny, with then health minister Morris Iemma pledging $5 in extra funding.

== Election campaigns (Macquarie Fields) 2005–2011 ==
After former NSW Health Minister Craig Knowles resigned from the New South Wales Parliament in 2005, Fraser stood as the Liberal candidate in the resulting by-election for his seat of Macquarie Fields, where she achieved a 12.38% swing towards the Liberals, but ultimately was defeated by Labor candidate Steven Chaytor. Fraser again stood as the Liberal Party candidate at the 2007 election for Macquarie Fields, where she achieved a similar result, with the seat being retained for Labor by Andrew McDonald.

Fraser again contested the 2011 election for Macquarie Fields, but this time as an Independent, where she came in third, behind the Labor and Liberal candidates, with 10.5% of the vote, with sitting member Andrew McDonald retaining the seat.

== Registration cancellation ==
On 30 July 2014 Fraser had her registration as a nurse and midwife cancelled for administering insulin potentiation therapy and intravenous vitamin therapy to her brother and three other cancer patients, under the direction of former doctor Chittoor Krishnan (who had voluntarily cancelled his registration and was no longer able to direct medical treatments).
