= Electoral district of Ingleburn =

Former state electoral district of New South Wales, Australia

Ingleburn was an electoral district of the Legislative Assembly in the Australian state of New South Wales, created in 1981, and named after and including the Sydney suburb of Ingleburn. It was abolished in 1988 and largely replaced by Macquarie Fields.

== Members for Ingleburn ==
Member	Party	Period
Stan Knowles	Labor	1981–1988

== Election results ==
=== Elections in the 1980s ===
==== 1984 ====
1984 New South Wales state election: Ingleburn
Party	Candidate	Votes	%	±%
Labor	Stan Knowles	18,554	63.0	−1.3
Liberal	Gary Lucas	10,897	37.0	+1.3
Total formal votes		29,451	96.5	+1.3
Informal votes		1,067	3.5	−1.3
Turnout		30,518	90.7	+0.8
Labor hold		Swing	−1.3	

==== 1981 ====
1981 New South Wales state election: Ingleburn
Party	Candidate	Votes	%	±%
Labor	Stan Knowles	17,173	64.3	−7.7
Liberal	Gary Lucas	9,548	35.7	+7.7
Total formal votes		26,721	95.2	
Informal votes		1,354	4.8	
Turnout		28,075	89.9	
Labor notional hold		Swing	−7.7	
