= Child Flight =

Australian not-for-profit helicopter service

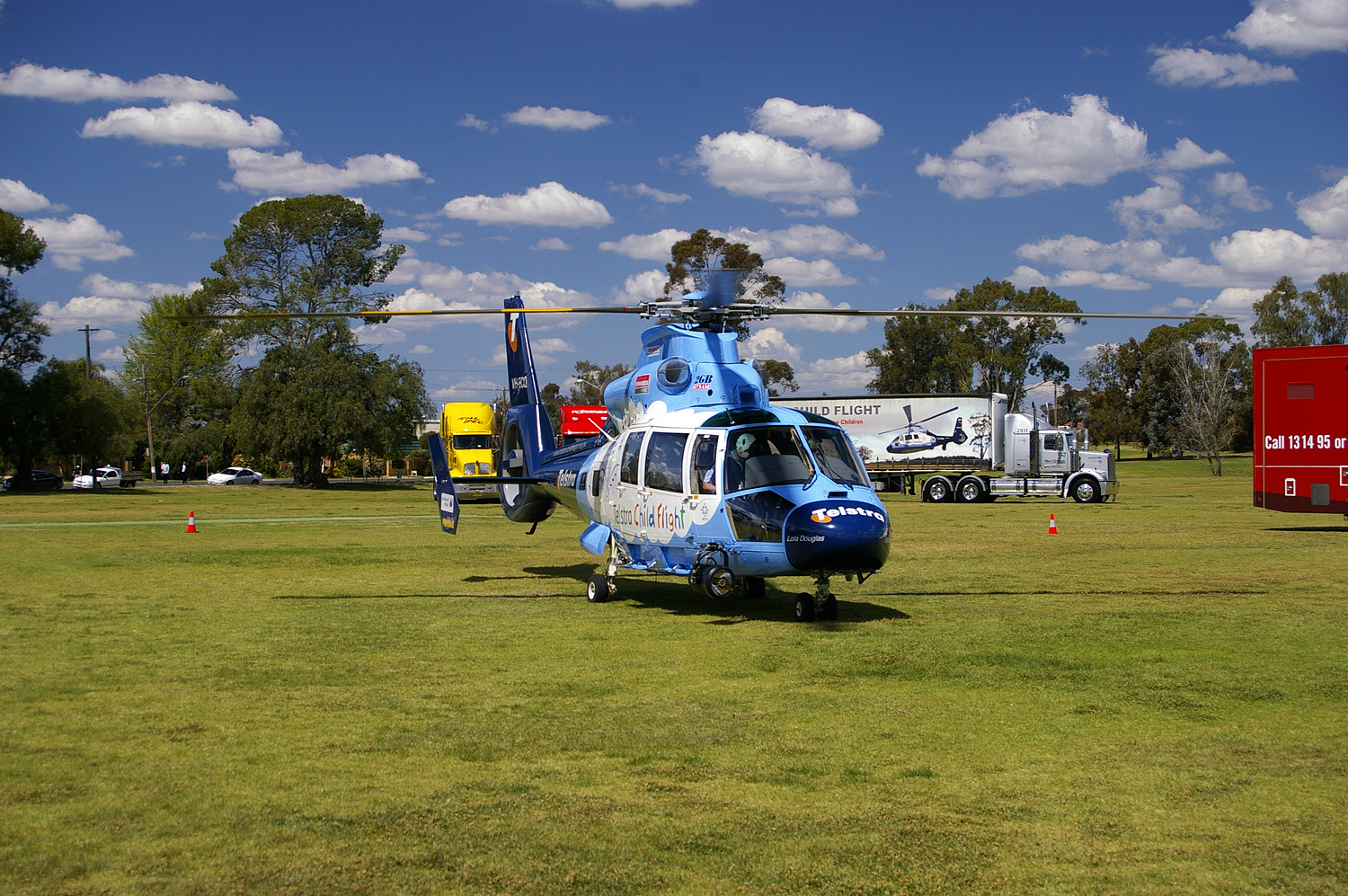
- Child Flight Eurocopter Dauphin N2
- Type: Not-for-profit organisation
- Industry: Air ambulance
- Founded: November 19, 1989
- Founders: Bart Bassett; Andrew Berry; Jeremy Ovens
- Defunct: 2013
- Headquarters: Westmead, New South Wales, Australia
- Area served: New South Wales
- Services: Emergency medical transport of newborns, infants and children
- Number of employees: 12

Child Flight was an Australian helicopter service dedicated to the emergency transport of sick children. It operated two twin-engined instrument-flight rated helicopters. As a not-for-profit organisation, the service relied on community support and corporate sponsorship to complement a government operating grant.

The service was located at the Newborn and paediatric Emergency Transport Service (NETS) statewide base at Westmead in Sydney. It was the preferred helicopter transport vehicle for NETS, the emergency medical transport service for newborns, infants and children. The service employed ten pilots, an aircraft maintenance engineer and fundraising and office staff.

== History ==
Founded by Bart Bassett, Dr. Andrew Berry and Jeremy Ovens to supply air transport to NETS, the service started with a twin-engine BO 105 helicopter on 19 November 1989. Within twelve months, a new BK 117 was delivered from the factory in Germany as the flagship of the service.

In 2000, a second helicopter was purchased to improve service continuity to NETS. It was a twin-engined Eurocopter AS365 N2 Dauphin with tricycle retractable landing gear and high-speed, long distance performance. In June 2010, another aircraft was introduced into the fleet; a Bell 412EP which provided more working space, carrying capacity and operating range than has previously been available from the BK 117.

In late November, it was announced that Child Flight's contract would cease on 31 December 2012 after the New South Wales Government awarded the Newborn and paediatric Emergency Transport Service contract to CareFlight. Child Flight had hoped to have the contract extended by six months, in order to sell the three aircraft without "fire sale" prices.

In December, the New South Wales Ministry of Health and Child Flight negotiated an agreement which will give Child Flight five months and A$400,000 to complete its transition, by ceasing its aviation arm but retaining a charity arm in support of medical retrieval. Child Flight and CareFlight also negotiated an agreement for a two-month lease for one helicopter from Child Flight, to continue the services that was once provided by Child Flight from 1 January 2013.
