= Anoulack Chanthivong =

Australian politician

The Honourable Anoulack Chanthivong MP
- Chanthivong in 2026

Minister for Better Regulation and Fair Trading
- Incumbent
- Assumed office 5 April 2023
- Premier: Chris Minns
- Preceded by: Victor Dominello (as Minister for Fair Trading)

Minister for Industry and Trade Minister for Innovation, Science and Technology
- Incumbent
- Assumed office 5 April 2023
- Premier: Chris Minns
- Preceded by: Alister Henskens (as Minister for Enterprise, Investment and Trade and Minister for Innovation, Science and Technology)

Minister for Building
- Incumbent
- Assumed office 5 April 2023
- Premier: Chris Minns
- Preceded by: Rob Stokes (as Minister for Infrastructure)

Minister for Corrections
- Incumbent
- Assumed office 5 April 2023
- Premier: Chris Minns
- Preceded by: Geoff Lee

Member of the New South Wales Parliament for Macquarie Fields
- Incumbent
- Assumed office 28 March 2015
- Preceded by: Andrew McDonald

Personal details
- Born: 20 July 1977 (age 49) Laos
- Party: Labor Party
- Spouse: Anna Kovalsky
- Children: 2
- Education: University of Sydney; London School of Economics
- Website: www.connectwithanoulack.com

Anoulack Chanthivong (born 20 July 1977) is an Australian politician who has served as a Minister in the Minns NSW Govvernment since 2023.

== Early life ==
Chanthivong was born in Laos and grew up in the Sydney suburb of Raby. He attended Robert Townson Public School and Robert Townson High School in Raby likely from approximately 1984 to 1989 (Primary School) and from approximately 1990 to 1995. (High School)

== Political career ==
Chanthivong was elected to Campbelltown City Council in 2004 and was mayor from 2011 to 2012.

He was elected to the New South Wales Legislative Assembly as the member for Macquarie Fields for the Labor Party at the 2015 New South Wales state election. On 11 June 2021, Chanthivong was appointed to the Minns Shadow Ministry, under the portfolios of Finance, Industry & Trade.

After the 2023 New South Wales state election, Chanthivong was sworn into the Minns ministry as Minister for Building, Corrections, Innovation, Science, Technology, Better Regulation, Fair Trading, Industry and Trade.

Political offices
Preceded by Victor Dominello	Minister for Better Regulation and Fair Trading; 2023–present	Incumbent
Preceded by Alister Henskens	Minister for Industry and Trade; 2023–present	Incumbent
Preceded by Alister Henskens	Minister for Innovation, Science and Technology; 2023–present	Incumbent
Preceded by Rob Stokes	Minister for Building; 2023–present	Incumbent
Preceded by Geoff Lee	Minister for Corrections; 2023–present	Incumbent
New South Wales Legislative Assembly
Preceded by Andrew McDonald	Member for Macquarie Fields; 2015–present	Incumbent
