= 2005 Macquarie Fields state by-election =

Election result for Macquarie Fields, New South Wales, Australia

A by-election was staged in the New South Wales Legislative Assembly district of Macquarie Fields on 17 September 2005. It was triggered by the resignation of sitting member and former minister Craig Knowles (Labor). The by-election was timed to coincide with two other state by-elections in Maroubra and Marrickville.

The by-election saw the Labor Party retain the seat with the election of candidate Steven Chaytor.

== Results ==
2005 Macquarie Fields by-election Saturday 17 September
Party	Candidate	Votes	%	±%
Labor	Steven Chaytor	23,072	49.30	−13.31
Liberal	Nola Fraser	15,332	32.76	+9.88
Greens	Ben Raue	2,406	5.14	+0.58
Independent	Ken Barnard	2,218	4.74	+4.74
Christian Democrats	Denis Plant	1,568	3.35	+0.28
AAFI	Janey Woodger	1,135	2.43	+0.54
One Nation	Bob Vinnicombe	1,066	2.28	+0.24
Total formal votes		46,797	96.53	+0.18
Informal votes		1,684	3.47	−0.18
Turnout		48,481	84.77	−6.99
Two-party-preferred result
Labor	Steven Chaytor	25,535	60.13	−12.38
Liberal	Nola Fraser	16,934	39.87	+12.38
Labor hold		Swing	−12.38	

== Aftermath ==
Steven Chaytor's stint as a member of parliament would prove to be a short one. In January 2007 he was found guilty of domestic assault. As a result, Chaytor stepped down as an MP and did not contest the 2007 state election.

== See also ==
- Electoral results for the district of Macquarie Fields
- List of New South Wales state by-elections
