= Bart Bassett =

Australian politician

Member of the New South Wales Parliament for Londonderry
- In office 26 March 2011 – 6 March 2015
- Preceded by: Allan Shearan
- Succeeded by: Prue Car

Personal details
- Born: 4 March 1961 (age 65)
- Party: Independent (since 2014)
- Other political affiliations: Liberals (Until 2014)
- Occupation: Commercial helicopter pilot and manager

Bart Edward Bassett (born 4 March 1961) is an Australian politician. He was a member of the New South Wales Legislative Assembly from 2011 to 2015, representing the electorate of Londonderry. He was elected as a member of the Liberal Party, but resigned to sit as an independent in August 2014 following revelations about his conduct at hearings of the New South Wales Independent Commission Against Corruption (ICAC). He was formerly mayor of the City of Hawkesbury from 2007 until 2012.

== Early years and background ==
Bassett was born and raised in western Sydney and, as a helicopter pilot, co-founded in 1989 the Australian arm of Child Flight, an Australian helicopter service dedicated to the emergency transport of sick children. Bassett was chair of the Windsor Road Taskforce, which campaigned for the upgrading of the key arterial route to the north west of Sydney.

== Political career ==
Bassett was elected to Hawkesbury Council in 2004 and became mayor later that year. He held the post until 2006 when he became deputy mayor, until regaining the position a year later.

He first contested the seat of Londonderry at the 2007 election gaining 34.4 per cent of the vote on first preferences, but was unsuccessful in defeating the incumbent Labor MP Allan Shearan. At the 2011 election, Bassett stood again and defeated Shearan, with a swing of 18.3 points, and a two-party-preferred vote of 62.3 per cent, winning the seat from Labor for the first time in its history, as a part of a statewide backlash against Labor, which had been in government since 1995.

Bassett was charged with drink driving on 15 June 2011, having a blood alcohol level of 0.053%.

On 8 April 2014 Bassett lost a Liberal preselection battle for the NSW state seat of Hawkesbury, which he was contesting in an effort to move from his present seat of Londonderry. Bassett has ruled out re-contesting Londonderry at the 2015 election, citing drastic changes to the boundaries of his old seat after a 2013 redistribution. The Liberal margin in Londonderry had been more than halved to 5.3 percent, and Bassett felt it would be better to find a candidate with more affinity to the area.

At a hearing of ICAC on 6 August 2014, it was alleged that Bassett had used his casting vote as mayor of Hawkesbury to approve a controversial development, a year before having an $18,000 donation credited to his 2011 state election campaign. Responding to the allegation, he said his decision to vote in favour of an aged care development by Buildev, a company owned by mining magnate Nathan Tinkler, was based on a recommendation for approval by council staff and had gone through all the normal processes. However Bassett declined to comment on evidence indicating a donation from another Tinkler-owned company, Boardwalk Resources, may have been used for his 2011 campaign. Bassett appeared before ICAC on 2 September 2014 and again denied ever soliciting donations from Buildev. The subsequent witness, a Buildev executive, contradicted Bassett's account, declaring Bassett sought, obtained, and thanked him for donations.

On 27 August, following the assertion at ICAC that the $18,000 donation made by Tinkler went straight into Bassett's bank account, and was used to buy election material, Bassett resigned from the Liberal Party room and moved to the crossbench pending investigation. However, there was never any suggestion that the bank account referred to was Bassett's personal account. It was his official election campaign account managed for him by his electoral agent and to which, in accordance with electoral law, he had no access.

In November 2014, the Liberal Party gave an ultimatum to Bassett and two other former Liberals who moved to the crossbench in the wake of the scandal—if they did not leave the party, they would be expelled.

On 30 August 2016, the Independent Commission Against Corruption released its report into the investigation into illegal developer donations. It found that Bassett had "Knowingly solicited a donation from a property developer"; however they did not recommenced the Director of Public Prosecutions pursue charges.

New South Wales Legislative Assembly
Preceded by Allan Shearan	Member for Londonderry; 2011–2015	Succeeded by Prue Car
