= Stan Knowles =

Australian politician

Stanley Alfred James Knowles (9 June 1931 – 30 December 2017), known as Stan Knowles, was an Australian politician elected as a member of the New South Wales Legislative Assembly.

Knowles was educated at Burwood Primary School and Ashfield Boys High School and became a small business operator. He married Marie in June 1955 and they had two sons. He was elected as an alderman of Liverpool City Council from 1976 until 1982 and was deputy mayor from 1980 to 1982.

Knowles was elected as the Labor Party member for Ingleburn in 1981 and re-elected until Ingleburn's abolition in 1988; he was then elected as the member for Macquarie Fields. He resigned in 1990 and was succeeded by his son, Craig Knowles.

New South Wales Legislative Assembly
Preceded by New seat	Member for Ingleburn; 1981–1988	Succeeded by Abolished
Preceded by New seat	Member for Macquarie Fields; 1988–1990	Succeeded by Craig Knowles
