= Andrew McDonald (Australian politician) =

Australian doctor and former politician (born 1955)

Member of the New South Wales Legislative Assembly for Macquarie Fields
- In office 24 March 2007 – 6 March 2015
- Preceded by: Steven Chaytor
- Succeeded by: Anoulack Chanthivong

Personal details
- Born: Andrew Dominic McDonald; 1 March 1955 (age 71)
- Party: Labor Party
- Education: University of Sydney
- Profession: Paediatrician

Andrew Dominic McDonald (born 1 March 1955) is an Australian doctor and former politician.

== Early life and education ==
McDonald attended St Leo's Catholic College in Wahroonga, before studying medicine at the University of Sydney.

== Career ==
=== Medical career ===
McDonald worked as a paediatrician at Campbelltown Hospital for 17 years before his election to Parliament. In this period, he was quoted by The Sydney Morning Herald as a critic of Opposition Leader John Brogden's policies on health.

=== Political career ===
On 23 January 2007, he was preselected for the New South Wales electoral district of Macquarie Fields by the Labor Party, following the disendorsement of incumbent MP Steven Chaytor. He was elected to the New South Wales Legislative Assembly at the 2007 New South Wales state election. Although Labor retained the seat, there was a 12% two-party preferred swing against the party (as compared to the previous election), the highest anti-Labor swing in the state.

During the government of Morris Iemma, journalist Imre Salusinszky recommended that McDonald be appointed Health Minister. The Sydney Morning Herald reported that Iemma sought to appoint McDonald to the ministry; however, Iemma's bid for a ministerial reshuffle was rejected, leading to Iemma's resignation. Under the premiership of Nathan Rees, McDonald was appointed as Parliamentary Secretary for Health on 23 September 2008. He retained this post upon the appointment of Kristina Keneally as Premier of New South Wales, ending his tenure as Parliamentary Secretary upon the defeat of the Keneally government in the 2011 New South Wales state election.

During the 2007–11 term of Parliament McDonald was a member of the Macarthur Boys, described as 'a new powerful force emerging from within the once powerful Right'. After the resignation of Morris Iemma from the premiership, it was speculated that McDonald might resign from Parliament to return to work as a paediatrician, and was reported to be considering retirement from Parliament. However, McDonald re-contested his seat of Macquarie Fields in the 2011 New South Wales state election.

McDonald was re-elected in the 2011 New South Wales state election for the electoral district of Macquarie Fields, suffering a 9.9-point swing towards the Liberal Party. At the election, Macquarie Fields became the third-most marginal seat held by the Labor Party in New South Wales. He was described as a 'hero of the election' for Labor, and as 'a thoroughly un-political character'.

After the 2011 election, McDonald was appointed as Shadow Minister for Health and Shadow Minister for Medical Research by Opposition Leader John Robertson. His appointment as Shadow Minister for Health was praised by Premier Barry O'Farrell. Although McDonald's shadow portfolio of Medical Research was reassigned in December 2013, he was given the additional portfolio of Shadow Minister for Liquor Regulation.

McDonald served as Shadow Minister for Health and as Shadow Minister for Liquor Regulation until his announcement in September 2014 that he would retire from state politics at the 2015 New South Wales state election. He was succeeded as Shadow Minister for Health and Shadow Minister for Liquor Regulation by Walt Secord, and as Member for Macquarie Fields by Anoulack Chanthivong.

McDonald continued to work one day a week as a paediatrician while serving as Member for Macquarie Fields and as Shadow Minister for Health. Upon his retirement from politics, he indicated that he would return to practicing medicine.

New South Wales Legislative Assembly
Preceded by Steven Chaytor	Member for Macquarie Fields; 2007–2015	Succeeded by Anoulack Chanthivong
