= Steven Chaytor =

Australian politician (born 1976)

Member of the New South Wales Parliament for Macquarie Fields
- In office 2005–2007
- Preceded by: Craig Knowles
- Succeeded by: Andrew McDonald

Personal details
- Born: 19 February 1976 (age 50)
- Party: Labor Party

Steven John Chaytor (born 19 February 1976) is an Australian former politician. He was a Labor Party member of the New South Wales Legislative Assembly from 2005 to 2007, representing the southwest Sydney electorate of Macquarie Fields.

Chaytor was educated at St Gregory's College in Campbelltown and the University of Technology, Sydney, where he completed degrees in international studies and law. He worked as a solicitor and advisor to former Prime Minister of Australia Gough Whitlam, and first entered local politics in 1999, when he was elected to the Campbelltown City Council.

Chaytor was widely expected as a favourite to enter federal politics when Mark Latham resigned as the member for the safe seat of Werriwa in 2005. However, after a messy pre-selection battle with Campbelltown Mayor Brenton Banfield over who would run in the resulting by-election, Chaytor lost out to compromise candidate Chris Hayes. There was little challenge possible, however, when Chaytor was nominated several months later to replace Craig Knowles in a by-election for his safe state seat of Macquarie Fields. Though he was challenged by whistleblower nurse Nola Fraser, Chaytor survived a strong swing to the Liberal Party to win the seat.

== Assault conviction ==
On 20 December 2006, Chaytor was charged with assault over an alleged incident which occurred on 10 December. Chaytor claimed in his defence that he was attempting to prevent his partner from self-harm. The Premier, Morris Iemma, sought to suspend Chaytor's membership of the Labor Party.

The case was heard on 15 January 2007 at Campbelltown Local Court, and Chaytor was found guilty four days later. NSW Premier Morris Iemma announced shortly after that he was to be expelled from the Labor Party and a new candidate found for the coming March state election. That new candidate was Dr Andrew McDonald, a local paediatrician.

Despite the fact that the assault conviction dealt with a personal matter involving Chaytor and that he had been disendorsed by the Labor Party, the Sunday Telegraph cited the conviction as among the reasons why the Iemma Government should be defeated at the March 2007 election.

On 30 July 2007, the conviction was quashed on appeal by the District Court, citing insufficient evidence. The appeal judge found that Chaytor had acted in self-defence and was trying to stop his former partner from committing suicide. The NSW branch of the ALP ultimately decided to reinstate Mr Chaytor's ALP membership in light of the legal decision.

Chaytor did not nominate as a candidate for re-election in the 2008 local government elections for Campbelltown City Council.

New South Wales Legislative Assembly
Preceded by Craig Knowles	Member for Macquarie Fields; 2005 – 2007	Succeeded by Andrew McDonald
