= Craig Knowles =

Australian politician

The Honourable Craig Knowles AM

Consul-General of Australia in Auckland
- In office 26 January 2018 – October 2022
- Preceded by: John Brand
- Succeeded by: Brad Williams

Minister for Natural Resources
- In office 2 April 2003 – 3 August 2005
- Premier: Bob Carr
- Succeeded by: Ian Macdonald

Minister for Infrastructure and Planning
- In office 2 April 2003 – 3 August 2005
- Premier: Bob Carr
- Preceded by: Andrew Refshauge
- Succeeded by: Frank Sartor

Minister for Health
- In office 8 April 1999 – 2 April 2003
- Premier: Bob Carr
- Preceded by: Andrew Refshauge
- Succeeded by: Morris Iemma

Member of the New South Wales Parliament for Macquarie Fields
- In office 27 March 1999 – 10 August 2005
- Preceded by: Seat created
- Succeeded by: Steven Chaytor
- In office 3 November 1990 – 3 May 1991
- Preceded by: Stan Knowles
- Succeeded by: Seat abolished

Member of the New South Wales Parliament for Moorebank
- In office 25 May 1991 – 5 March 1999
- Preceded by: Seat created
- Succeeded by: Seat abolished

Personal details
- Born: Craig John Knowles; 27 February 1959 (age 67) Liverpool, New South Wales, Australia
- Party: New South Wales Labor Party
- Parent: Stan Knowles (father)

Craig John Knowles AM (born 27 February 1959) is an Australian former politician and diplomat. He was a member of the New South Wales Legislative Assembly from 1990 to 2005 and served in many ministerial portfolios.

== Early life ==
Craig Knowles was born in Liverpool, New South Wales to parents Marie and Stan Knowles. Stan was a member for Ingleburn from 1981 to 1988 and Macquarie Fields from 1988 to 1990. Craig was educated at Liverpool Boys High School, Sydney College of Technical and Further Education. He worked in the New South Wales Department of Business and Consumer Affairs from 1988 and was the Western Sydney Co-ordinator in the Office of State Development of New South Wales Premiers' Department from 1987 to 1988. He was an alderman on Liverpool City Council from 1982 to 1994 and Mayor from 1986 until 1988.

== Political career ==
Knowles served as a Labor Party member for Macquarie Fields from May 1990 to May 1991, Moorebank from 1991 to 1999 and Macquarie Fields from 1999 to 2005. He was Minister for Urban Affairs and Planning from 1995 to 1999, Minister for Health from 1999 to 2003 and Minister for Infrastructure and Planning and Minister for Natural Resources from 2003 to 2005.

Knowles introduced a number of changes during his time as Planning Minister. These included the introduction of private certification of buildings. Another controversial change was the introduction of Part 3A of the Environmental Planning and Assessment Act, which increased the powers of the Minister in approving major developments and superseded heritage and environmental protection legislation.

Knowles' political career was damaged by allegations raised by nurse Nola Fraser in relation to deaths at Campbelltown and Camden hospitals when he was Minister for Health. An Independent Commission Against Corruption inquiry into Knowles' behaviour cleared the minister in September 2005, but he had already been moved from the health portfolio. He was also damaged by the Orange Grove affair, as a supporter of a retail outlet, which was later found to have been opened in contravention of zoning regulations in his electorate, while he was Minister for Urban Affairs and Planning. In April 2005, he was charged with drink-driving at a random breath test, with a low-level over the limit reading.

Knowles had been considered a possible successor to Bob Carr as Premier but declined to be nominated when Carr retired in August 2005; himself resigning from the ministry the same day as Carr and his deputy, Andrew Refshauge. Knowles resigned from parliament a few days later, sparking the 2005 Macquarie Fields by-election. He was ultimately succeeded by Labor's candidate Steven Chaytor.

== After politics ==
After his retirement from politics, Knowles became a consultant and political lobbyist. He has a number of advisory roles, statutory appointments, and non-profit directorships, including:

- Chair, Natural Resources Access Regulator Board (2017 - present)
- President, the Asthma Foundation of New South Wales (since 2008–present)
- Former Director, the Black Dog Institute
- Director, the Children's Medical Research Institute (2007–present)
- Director, the Học Mãi Foundation at The University of Sydney
- Member, Advisory Board, Built Holdings Pty Limited
- Chair, Murray Darling Basin Authority (2011–2015)

At the 2015 Australia Day Honours, Knowles was appointed a Member of the Order of Australia for significant service to local government, to the Parliament of New South Wales, and to the community through a range of health initiatives.

In January 2018, Knowles was appointed by Trade Minister Steven Ciobo as the Consul-General of Australia in Auckland, New Zealand.

Civic offices
Preceded by Casey Conway	Mayor of Liverpool; 1986–1987	Succeeded by Casey Conway
New South Wales Legislative Assembly
Preceded by Stan Knowles	Member for Macquarie Fields; 1990–1991	District abolished
New district	Member for Moorebank; 1991–1999	District abolished
New district	Member for Macquarie Fields; 1999–2005	Succeeded by Steven Chaytor
Political offices
Preceded by Robert Webster as Minister for Planning; Minister for Housing	Minister for Urban Affairs and Planning; 1995–1999	Succeeded by Andrew Refshauge
Preceded by Robert Webster as Minister for Planning; Minister for Housing	Minister for Housing; 1995–1999	Succeeded by Andrew Refshauge
Preceded by Andrew Refshauge	Minister for Health; 1999–2003	Succeeded by Morris Iemma
Preceded by Andrew Refshauge as Minister for Planning	Minister for Infrastructure and Planning; 2003–2005	Succeeded by Frank Sartor as Minister for Planning
Vacant Title last held by Ian Causley	Minister for Natural Resources; 2003–2005	Succeeded by Ian Macdonald
Diplomatic posts
Preceded by John Brand	Consul-General of Australia in Auckland; 2018–2022	Succeeded by Brad Williams
