= Allan Shearan =

Australian politician

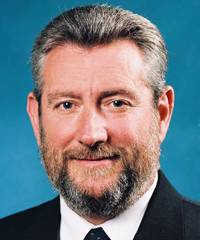
- Portrait of Allan Francis Shearan

Member of the New South Wales Assembly for Londonderry
- In office 31 May 2003 – 4 March 2011
- Preceded by: Jim Anderson
- Succeeded by: Bart Bassett

Personal details
- Born: 1 July 1953 (age 71)
- Political party: Labor

Allan Francis Shearan (born 1 July 1953) is a former Australian politician, elected as a member of the New South Wales Legislative Assembly.

Shearan represented Londonderry for the Labor Party from 2003 to 2011.

== Notes ==
New South Wales Legislative Assembly
Preceded by Jim Anderson	Member for Londonderry; 2003–2011	Succeeded by Bart Bassett
