= Electoral district of Macquarie Fields =

Macquarie Fields New South Wales—Legislative Assembly
- Interactive map of district boundaries from the 2023 state election
- State: New South Wales
- Dates current: 1988–1991, 1999–present
- MP: Anoulack Chanthivong
- Party: Labor Party
- Namesake: Macquarie Fields
- Electors: 61,782 (2019)
- Area: 94.19 km^{2} (36.4 sq mi)
- Demographic: Outer-metropolitan
Electorates around Macquarie Fields:
Leppington	Leppington	Holsworthy
Leppington	Macquarie Fields	Holsworthy
Leppington	Campbelltown	Campbelltown

Macquarie Fields is an electoral district of the Legislative Assembly in the Australian state of New South Wales, located in the outer south-western suburbs of Sydney. It is currently represented by Anoulack Chanthivong of the Labor Party.

== Geography ==
On its current boundaries, Macquarie Fields takes in the suburbs of Bardia, Bow Bowing, Casula, Cross Roads, Denham Court, Edmondson Park, Eschol Park, Glenfield, Ingleburn, Kearns, Kentlyn, Leppington, Leumeah, Long Point, Macquarie Fields, Macquarie Links, Minto, Minto Heights, Raby, St Andrews and Varroville.

== Members for Macquarie Fields ==
First incarnation (1988–1991)
Member	Party	Term
Stan Knowles	Labor	1988–1990
Craig Knowles	Labor	1990–1991
Second incarnation (1999–present)
Member	Party	Term
Craig Knowles	Labor	1999–2005
Steven Chaytor	Labor	2005–2007
Andrew McDonald	Labor	2007–2015
Anoulack Chanthivong	Labor	2015–present

== Election results ==
2023 New South Wales state election: Macquarie Fields
Party	Candidate	Votes	%	±%
Labor	Anoulack Chanthivong	28,089	57.1	+3.7
Liberal	Khairul Chowdhury	10,682	21.7	−6.8
Liberal Democrats	Gemma Noiosi	4,122	8.4	+8.3
Greens	Seamus Lee	2,349	4.8	+0.6
Animal Justice	Donna Wilson	2,346	4.8	+4.5
Sustainable Australia	Michael Clark	1,606	3.3	+3.3
Total formal votes		49,194	95.6	+0.2
Informal votes		2,266	4.4	−0.2
Turnout		51,460	86.3	−0.3
Two-party-preferred result
Labor	Anoulack Chanthivong	30,468	69.9	+5.0
Liberal	Khairul Chowdhury	13,141	30.1	−5.0
Labor hold		Swing	+5.0	
