= Electoral results for the district of Smithfield =

Election results for Smithfield, New South Wales, Australia

Smithfield, an electoral district of the Legislative Assembly in the Australian state of New South Wales, was established in 1988. It was abolished in 2015 and largely replaced by Prospect.

== Members ==
Election	Member	Party
1988	Janice Crosio	Labor
1990 by	Carl Scully	Labor
1991	Carl Scully	Labor
1995	Carl Scully	Labor
1999	Carl Scully	Labor
2003	Carl Scully	Labor
2007	Ninos Khoshaba	Labor
2011	Andrew Rohan	Liberal

== Election results ==
=== 2011 ===
2011 New South Wales state election: Smithfield
Party	Candidate	Votes	%	±%
Liberal	Andrew Rohan	21,443	46.3	+18.8
Labor	Ninos Khoshaba	17,323	37.4	−14.9
Greens	Astrid O'Neill	3,818	8.3	+0.1
Christian Democrats	Manny Poularas	3,680	8.0	+2.5
Total formal votes		46,264	94.6	−0.7
Informal votes		2,661	5.4	+0.7
Turnout		48,925	94.5	
Two-party-preferred result
Liberal	Andrew Rohan	23,009	54.8	+20.3
Labor	Ninos Khoshaba	18,948	45.2	−20.3
Liberal gain from Labor		Swing	+20.3	

=== Elections in the 2000s ===
==== 2007 ====
2007 New South Wales state election: Smithfield
Party	Candidate	Votes	%	±%
Labor	Ninos Khoshaba	22,921	52.4	−13.8
Liberal	Andrew Rohan	12,053	27.5	+7.4
Greens	Vlaudin Vega	3,587	8.2	+3.6
Christian Democrats	Liam Pender	2,373	5.4	+2.6
Against Further Immigration	Alexander Pini	1,500	3.4	+2.8
Unity	Minh Phu	1,329	3.0	+0.5
Total formal votes		43,763	95.2	−0.6
Informal votes		2,188	4.8	+0.6
Turnout		45,951	94.3	
Two-party-preferred result
Labor	Ninos Khoshaba	24,959	65.5	−10.4
Liberal	Andrew Rohan	13,171	34.5	+10.4
Labor hold		Swing	−10.4	

==== 2003 ====
2003 New South Wales state election: Smithfield
Party	Candidate	Votes	%	±%
Labor	Carl Scully	27,499	67.3	+5.0
Liberal	Essam Benjamin	7,459	18.3	−3.7
Greens	Johnn Fonseca	2,006	4.9	+1.8
Christian Democrats	Manny Poularas	1,282	3.1	−0.2
Unity	Steve Chung	1,196	2.9	+2.9
One Nation	Gerald Cluderay	772	1.9	−3.9
Democrats	David Holloway	626	1.5	−0.9
Total formal votes		40,840	95.8	−0.7
Informal votes		1,784	4.2	+0.7
Turnout		42,624	92.9	
Two-party-preferred result
Labor	Carl Scully	28,665	77.8	+5.0
Liberal	Essam Benjamin	8,203	22.2	−5.0
Labor hold		Swing	+5.0	

=== Elections in the 1990s ===
==== 1999 ====
1999 New South Wales state election: Smithfield
Party	Candidate	Votes	%	±%
Labor	Carl Scully	25,276	62.3	+2.6
Liberal	Bob Robertson	8,924	22.0	−11.0
One Nation	Warren Dutton	2,352	5.8	+5.8
Christian Democrats	Lewis Haroon	1,341	3.3	+3.2
Greens	Vlaudin Vega	1,265	3.1	+3.1
Democrats	Manny Poularas	956	2.4	−4.2
Against Further Immigration	Earnest Nelson	430	1.1	+1.1
Total formal votes		40,544	96.5	+4.8
Informal votes		1,483	3.5	−4.8
Turnout		42,027	93.5	
Two-party-preferred result
Labor	Carl Scully	26,525	72.8	+9.3
Liberal	Bob Robertson	9,916	27.2	−9.3
Labor hold		Swing	+9.3	

==== 1995 ====
1995 New South Wales state election: Smithfield
Party	Candidate	Votes	%	±%
Labor	Carl Scully	21,530	60.3	+8.3
Liberal	Bob Robertson	11,711	32.8	−1.0
Democrats	Manny Poularas	2,442	6.8	+6.8
Total formal votes		35,683	91.9	+7.9
Informal votes		3,166	8.1	−7.9
Turnout		38,849	94.4	
Two-party-preferred result
Labor	Carl Scully	22,266	63.7	+6.7
Liberal	Bob Robertson	12,692	36.3	−6.7
Labor hold		Swing	+6.7	

==== 1991 ====
1991 New South Wales state election: Smithfield
Party	Candidate	Votes	%	±%
Labor	Carl Scully	15,473	52.1	+0.1
Liberal	Bob Robertson	10,053	33.8	−6.1
Independent	Joe Morizzi	3,298	11.1	+11.1
Call to Australia	Elias Hammo	894	3.0	+1.7
Total formal votes		29,718	83.9	−11.0
Informal votes		5,691	16.1	+11.0
Turnout		35,409	94.9	
Two-party-preferred result
Labor	Carl Scully	16,260	57.0	+1.9
Liberal	Bob Robertson	12,279	43.0	−1.9
Labor hold		Swing	+1.9	

==== 1990 by-election ====
1990 Smithfield by-election Saturday 23 June
Party	Candidate	Votes	%	±%
Labor	Carl Scully	16,844	68.5	+7.7
Democrats	Catherine Bateson	3,505	14.3	
Call to Australia	Brian Grigg	1,913	7.8	
Independent	Sandor Torzsok	1,329	5.4	
Independent	Ted Oldfield	996	4.1	
Total formal votes		24,587	95.6	
Informal votes		1,125	4.4	
Turnout		25,712	80.8	
Two-candidate-preferred result
Labor	Carl Scully	18,080	80.2	+19.4
Democrats	Catherine Bateson	4,476	19.8	
Labor hold		Swing	+19.4 (Note: compared to the two-party-preferred result for the 1988 Smithfield election.)	

Janice Crosio (Labor) resigned.

=== Elections in the 1980s ===
==== 1988 ====
1988 New South Wales state election: Smithfield
Party	Candidate	Votes	%	±%
Labor	Janice Crosio	16,250	60.8	−6.4
Liberal	Glenn Ford	10,468	39.2	+14.5
Total formal votes		26,718	94.5	−1.1
Informal votes		1,549	5.5	+1.1
Turnout		28,267	93.6	
Labor notional hold		Swing	−11.5	
