= Electoral results for the district of Prospect =

Australian district election results

Prospect, an electoral district of the Legislative Assembly in the Australian state of New South Wales, was created in 2015, largely replacing Smithfield.

== Members for Prospect ==
Election	Member	Party
2015	Hugh McDermott	Labor
2019	Hugh McDermott	Labor
2023	Hugh McDermott	Labor

== Election results ==
=== Elections in the 2020s ===
==== 2023 ====
2023 New South Wales state election: Prospect
Party	Candidate	Votes	%	±%
Labor	Hugh McDermott	24,519	49.3	−1.0
Liberal	Kalvin Biag	17,903	36.0	−0.3
Greens	Sujan Selventhiran	3,610	7.3	+2.5
Sustainable Australia	Peter Shafer	1,892	3.8	+3.8
Animal Justice	Emily Walsh	1,775	3.6	+1.1
Total formal votes		49,699	95.4	−0.5
Informal votes		2,375	4.6	+0.5
Turnout		52,074	88.5	+1.2
Two-party-preferred result
Labor	Hugh McDermott	27,175	58.7	+0.1
Liberal	Kalvin Biag	19,137	41.3	−0.1
Labor hold		Swing	+0.1	

=== Elections in the 2010s ===
==== 2019 ====
2019 New South Wales state election: Prospect
Party	Candidate	Votes	%	±%
Labor	Hugh McDermott	24,235	51.73	+6.94
Liberal	Matthew Hana	15,851	33.84	−4.61
Independent	Milan Maksimovic	2,950	6.30	+6.30
Greens	Dorothea Newland	2,345	5.01	−1.80
Animal Justice	Catherine Ward	1,464	3.13	+3.13
Total formal votes		46,845	95.43	+0.26
Informal votes		2,242	4.57	−0.26
Turnout		49,087	90.20	−1.23
Two-party-preferred result
Labor	Hugh McDermott	26,008	60.66	+7.26
Liberal	Matthew Hana	16,867	39.34	−7.26
Labor hold		Swing	+7.26	

==== 2015 ====
2015 New South Wales state election: Prospect
Party	Candidate	Votes	%	±%
Labor	Hugh McDermott	21,156	44.8	+4.3
Liberal	Andrew Rohan	18,158	38.5	−3.8
Christian Democrats	Sam Georgis	3,351	7.1	−0.2
Greens	Sujan Selventhiran	3,214	6.8	−0.4
No Land Tax	Angelo Esposito	1,345	2.8	+2.8
Total formal votes		47,224	95.2	+0.8
Informal votes		2,393	4.8	−0.8
Turnout		49,617	91.4	+2.6
Two-party-preferred result
Labor	Hugh McDermott	22,946	53.4	+4.5
Liberal	Andrew Rohan	20,027	46.6	−4.5
Labor notional gain from Liberal		Swing	+4.5	

Prospect was a new seat largely replacing the abolished district of Smithfield. Andrew Rohan (Liberal) was the member for Smithfield.
