= William Ewart Hart =

Australian aviator and dentist (1885–1943)

- Born: April 20, 1885; Parramatta, New South Wales, Australia
- Died: July 29, 1943 (aged 58); Sydney, Australia
- Spouse: Thelma Clare Cock (m. 10 August 1929)

William Ewart Hart (20 April 1885 – 29 July 1943) was an Australian aviator and dentist. He was the first qualified pilot in Australia. His aviator's licence, No. 1, was issued on 5 December 1911 by the Aerial League of Australia.

William Ewart Hart was often referred to as “Billy” or “Bill”. His birth was registered as taking place in the Hart family home on Darcy Street, Parramatta. His father William Hart Junior and grandfather Mr William Hart, were well-known businessmen from the suburb of Wentworthville, near Parramatta. His father purchased a property on Wentworth Avenue, building Castrella in July 1888, where young William would most probably have grown up. His father was known to be a philanthropist and supported young William and the Australian aviation industry financially.

Hart was born and educated in the Parramatta district. Aged 16 he was apprenticed to a local dentist, Mr Maxwell. He was registered as a dentist on 26 June 1906. After registration he practiced as a dentist in Wyalong, where he rode the first motorcycle and drove the first car in town. He went on to practice in Newcastle.

In September 1911 Hart met Joseph Hammond who was touring Australia as a demonstration pilot for the British & Colonial Aeroplane Company. He bought (for £1,333) a Bristol Boxkite from Hammond, received some instruction from Hammond's mechanic, McDonald. A gale blew the plane, which was parked at Belmore Park, Penrith, over, and it was wrecked. Hart, with the help of friends and the mechanic, built a new aircraft, using some salvaged parts. Timbers were supplied by Hart’s father. On 3 November 1911, he flew from Penrith to Parramatta with his younger brother Jack as passenger, completing the first cross-country flight in New South Wales. In 1963, a monument was erected in Parramatta Park where he had landed.

On 30 June 1912, Hart won an air race—from Botany to Parramatta Park and return, and billed as the 'First International Aviation Contest'—when his opponent lost his way due to rain clouds and landed at Belmore. The race had been planned for 16 June 1912, but had been deferred due to bad weather.

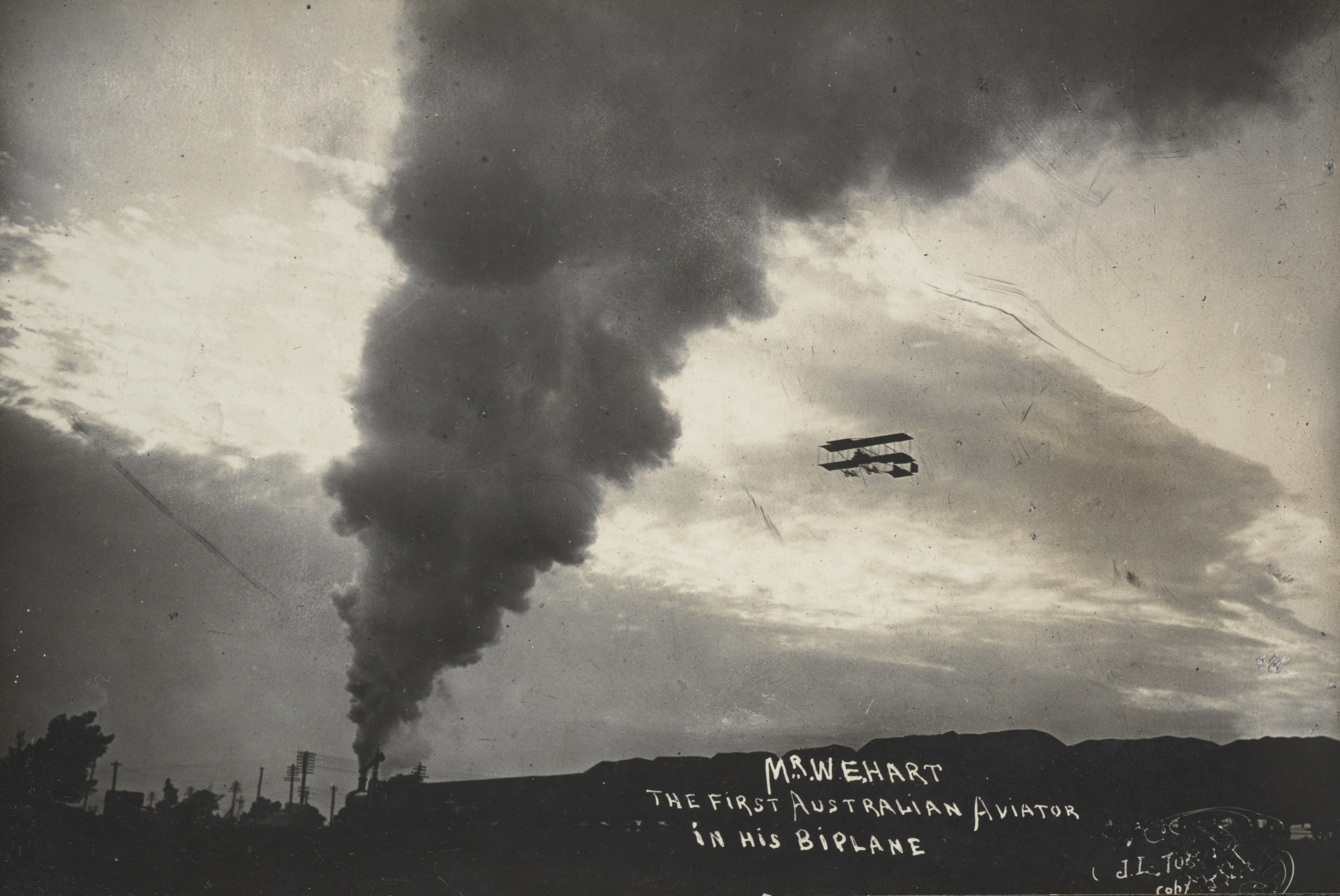
William Ewart Hart in his Bristol Boxkite Biplane, 1912.
