= Hugh McDermott (politician) =

Australian politician

Dr Hugh McDermott MP
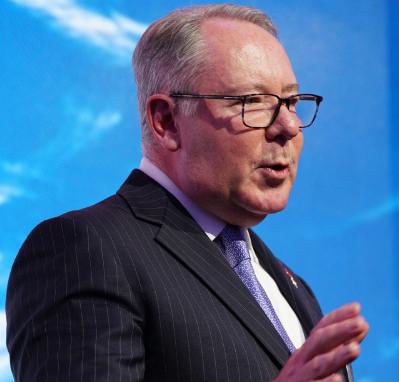

Member of the New South Wales Parliament for Prospect
- Incumbent
- Assumed office 28 March 2015
- Preceded by: Seat created

Personal details
- Born: Paul Joseph Hugh McDermott; 15 June 1968 (age 58) Sydney, Australia
- Party: Labor Party
- Spouse: Bettina McMahon
- Education: University of Technology Sydney The University of Sydney King's College London
- Occupation: Politician
- Profession: Barrister-at-law
- Website: www.hughmcdermott.com

Paul Joseph Hugh McDermott (born 15 June 1968) is an Australian politician who was elected to the New South Wales Legislative Assembly as the State Member for Prospect for the Labor Party at the 2015 New South Wales state election. Prior to entering Parliament he had a career as an international lawyer and university academic. Since 2023 he has served as Parliamentary Secretary to the Attorney-General in the government of Chris Minns.

== Military service ==
McDermott joined the Australian Defence Force (Army General Reserve) as a soldier, before being promoted as a Non-Commissioned Officer. He was at one time selected to attend the Army's Officer Cadet Training Program (Sydney University Regiment/Royal Military College Duntroon) and received a Probationary Commission (Reserve Forces – Infantry). McDermott's military service included serving as a Forward Observer Signalman with 41 Battery, 5/11 Field Regiment, Royal Australian Artillery; an M113A1 Armoured Vehicle Driver and crew commander with A Squadron, 12/16 Hunter River Lancers, Royal Australian Armoured Corps; and as an NCO and Officer Cadet with the Sydney University Regiment, Royal Australian Infantry Corps. He also spent periods of time posted to full-time duty with the Australian Regular Army. McDermott was awarded the Australian Defence Medal for his military service.

== Activism within the Labour Movement ==
McDermott states that he holds a strong belief in Catholic social teaching. He admires those who do not simply talk about their beliefs, but put those beliefs into pragmatic action and help their community. As such he considered joining the priesthood. In his inaugural speech, McDermott spoke about his admiration for the example of Jesuits and religious members who stood up and were counted to help the vulnerable and fight oppression – especially their political opposition to fascism in Europe in the 1930s and 40s.

Upon moving to Sydney in 1992 McDermott took up a position with the Catholic Industrial Office within the Roman Catholic Archdiocese of Sydney. It was there he met John Ducker, who had a profound effect on the path of his career and life. Ducker, Chairman of the Catholic Industrial Affairs Committee, was a former NSW Labour Council Secretary and Minister in the Wran Labor Government. He believed that to be a Catholic, and to believe in Catholic social teaching, one must put that belief into action.

Ducker introduced McDermott to Laurie Short, who became his role model as a great Labour leader. Short was the former National Secretary of the Federated Ironworkers Association of Australia (FIA). Short led the fight against Stalinist-communist factions that had infiltrated the trade union movement and the Australian Labor Party. Short's success in winning the FIA ballot in 1951 against enormous vote rigging and violence led to the beginning of the end of the communist-dominated unions and the emergence of social democrats retaking control of the Australian Labour Movement and ALP. Every fortnight for many years Short and McDermott would meet for lunch and discuss politics. During these discussions, McDermott realised his vocation was to fight for working people by being a member of the Labor movement. McDermott wanted to see people have equality at work and to return safely to their families after work and to live their lives in peace and respect.

McDermott worked part-time for the FIA at their Newcastle Office, involving 4.00 am gate meetings at the BHP steelworks and learning union organising skills. Under the Australian Council of Trade Unions' amalgamation program, the FIA amalgamated with the Australasian Society Engineers and in turn, the Australian Workers Union (AWU). During this time McDermott met the newly elected joint Secretary of the NSW Branch of the amalgamated AWU, Russ Collison. Collison became McDermott's role model, mentor, confident and, as a labour leader, McDermott's greatest personal influence. McDermott joined the AWU NSW Branch, based at Granville in Western Sydney, as a full-time State Organiser in 1994. He organised labour at manufacturing sites at Western Sydney, civil construction and workshops on the railways, amongst others. He was later elected to the AWU State Executive and appointed NSW Metal Mining Co-ordinator.

== Legal and academic career ==
While working full-time with the AWU, McDermott studied law at night at the University of Sydney and University of Technology Sydney, completing a Bachelor of Laws with Honours and a Master of Labour Law and Relations. McDermott's Masters Supervisor was Sydney Law School Dean, Professor Ron McCallum AO and McDermott's College of Law Supervisor was Justice Conrad Staff. McDermott was admitted as a solicitor in NSW in 1999 and as a barrister and solicitor of the High Court of Australia in 2000. He continued to act for the AWU in mediations, arbitrations and civil prosecutions across industry sectors including defence, mining, energy, public services, construction, rail, engineering and manufacturing.

McDermott was appointed to the Victorian Industrial Relations Taskforce in mid-2000. The Taskforce was an independent inquiry of 6 months duration into law reform within the State of Victoria. McDermott was required to investigate and report on the social and economic effects arising from the previous Kennett Liberal Government's law reforms. He co-authored the Taskforce Report.

In 2000, McDermott was awarded the King's College London (School of Law) Overseas Postgraduate Research Scholarship, the Julian Small Foundation Research Grant (Law) and the London Goodenough Trust for Overseas Graduates Fellowship to compete a PhD in law at King's College, London, University of London. McDermott's PhD Supervisor was eminent legal academic, Professor Keith Ewing, Professor of Public Law, King's College London. In 2001, McDermott was appointed as a Lecturer and Doctoral Researcher at King's College London. McDermott became actively involved in UK based policy research institutions including the British Institute of International and Comparative Law, the Institute of Employment Rights, the International Cente for Trade Union Rights, the Foreign Policy Centre and the UK Society of Labour Lawyers. He also continued to be active in politics and joined the British Labour Party, campaigning on numerous local and regional elections. In February 2002, McDermott was elected a Commissioner of the International Commission for Labour Rights, Geneva, Switzerland. McDermott was awarded a Doctor of Philosophy in Laws from King's College London, The University of London in 2008.

In addition to his lecturing and research work, in 2002, McDermott was appointed as the International Adviser (Asia-Pacific) with The Law Society of England and Wales, London. McDermott was the head of the Asia-Pacific team specialising in advising UK law firms, multi-national corporations, national governments, NGOs and regulatory bodies on disputes arising out of business in the Asia-Pacific region. He increasing worked with law enforcement and regulatory agencies on financial crime related matters involving solicitors. McDermott was admitted as a Solicitor Advocate of England and Wales in 2006. Between 2003 and 2006, McDermott was a guest lecturer at the UK Foreign & Commonwealth Office and the Corporation of the City of London. He was invited by the City of London to lecture on UK Government Industry Briefing Courses for British Diplomats and Staff. As part of this invitation he regularly lecturered British diplomats, commercial attaches and embassy staff on international trade regulation and current international law issues. McDermott was awarded the Freedom of the City of London, being made a Citizen and Liveryman of the City in 2006 for his professional work, especially his advice to successive Lord Mayors of London.

In 2006, McDermott accepted an appointment as a commercial litigator with a law firm in the Cayman Islands specialising in financial crime, anti-money laundering and anti-corruption practice in a number of offshore jurisdictions. McDermott advised on large, complex, multi-jurisdictional litigation disputes and appeared before the Summary Court, the Grand Court and the Court of Appeal of the Cayman Islands. While in the Cayman Islands, McDermott lobbied for the establishment of an anti-corruption agency, immigration reform and the recognition of trade union rights on the islands. From 2007 to 2008 McDermott was a visiting lecturer at the Cayman Islands Law School, an overseas school of The University of Liverpool, and the Faculty of Business Studies, University College of the Cayman Islands.

On his return to Australia in 2008, McDermott was appointed as the NSW Senior Manager – Major Fraud and International Enforcement, with the Australian Securities and Investments Commission (ASIC). He was responsible for the Sydney legal team that specialised in pursuing regulatory matters in the internationally linked securities, investments and financial services industry sectors. During 2010, McDermott lectured and tutored at the Department of Government and International Relations, The University of Sydney. He tutored undergraduates in the subject of Geopolitics. He also developed subject material and lectured postgraduates undertaking the Master of International Relations program on counter-terrorist financing.

McDermott returned to private legal practice and was Called to The Bar of England and Wales and The Honourable Society of the Inner Temple in 2010. In 2011, he was Called to the NSW Bar. While at the Bar, McDermott provided advice to major financial institutions, multi-national corporations, national governments, law enforcement, regulatory agencies and private industry clients on a range of legal and regulatory matters. His practice specialised in financial crime, anti-money laundering and proceeds of crime matters. He appeared before the Supreme Court of NSW, the NSW District and Local Courts, and the Federal Court of Australia. Whilst practising as a Barrister, McDermott also held the dual appointments of Senior Lecturer in Law Enforcement and Postgraduate Course Director of the Anti-Money Laundering and Counter-Terrorist Financing, Fraud and Financial Crime Program, at the Australian Graduate School of Policing and Security, Charles Sturt University. In this role he lectured to postgraduate students, law enforcement, regulators and corporate compliance officers in Australia, at the Jakarta Centre for Law Enforcement Cooperation (UNODC Indonesia), and the National Police Academy India. He published 2 leading textbooks on financial crime including Investigation and Prosecution of Financial Crime – International Readings, (2014) Thomson Reuters/The Law Book Co; and Fraud, Financial Crime and Money Laundering, (2013) Thomson Reuters/The Law Book Co.

== Political career ==
In October 2015, McDermott won Labor Party preselection to contest the seat of Division of Prospect. The win, over frontrunner Ninos Khoshaba, was considered an upset. He subsequently won the seat for Labor, joining NSW Parliament from 2015. In the parliament he served on the Committee on the Ombudsman, the Law Enforcement Conduct Commission and the Crime Commission.

McDermott served in senior roles on ALP policy committees, election campaigns, state and federal government committees. He was elected as a rank-and file representative for Western Sydney to the NSW Labor State Policy forum, Co-chair of the NSW Safer Communities Commission and President of the NSW Society of Labor Lawyers. He is a member of the dominant Centre-Unity faction of NSW Labor.

McDermott was the Labor's sixth New South Wales candidate on the ballot for the Senate at the 2010 federal election.

In October 2014, McDermott defeated the former Labor member for Smithfield Ninos Khoshaba in a preselection ballot for the newly created seat of Prospect 76 votes to 23. He went on to win the seat of Prospect by a swing of 4.9 points.

In October 2026, McDermott announced his resignation from Parliament to take effect from the 2027 election.

== Controversy ==
Staff working within McDermott's electorate office were, in November 2015, found by the Labor Party's internal review tribunal to have engaged in "serious misconduct" by stacking branches with false members in the catchment area of McDermott's state electorate.

In June 2016, McDermott was accused by Liberal Minister David Elliott of fabricating aspects of his military service and misleading the Parliament about his level of promotion within the Army Reserves. In addition to this, he was photographed wearing a medal that was never issued during his time of service, and claimed it as his own. He would later apologise for the misuse of the medal, but would not clarify from where he got it.

In March 2018, media outlets reported that McDermott has dismissed three employees in late November and that one former employee had since made allegations of sexual and verbal harassment. Nicole Scott filled a complaint with the Public Service Association of NSW and alleged that McDermott had "pressed his groin against her back and brushed past her breast" on several occasions. Regarding the level of staff dismissal, the NSW Public Service Association General Secretary that it was unusual for that many people to be dismissed from an MP's office and the matter was subsequently raised with the NSW ALP. In relation to the sexual harassment claim, an investigation was carried out by Barrister John Whelan and instituted by NSW Labor who found that there were no substance to the allegations made. McDermott addressed the allegations in a Private Members' Statement to the NSW Parliament on 15 May 2018, and at various times on social media.

In 2020, McDermott was criticised by Sri Lanka after he attended a Black Tiger Day commemoration by supporters of the Liberation Tigers of Tamil Eelam (LTTE) to honour the LTTE's first suicide bomber Vallipuram Vasanthan alias Capt. Miller.

New South Wales Legislative Assembly
New seat	Member for Prospect; 2015–present	Incumbent
