= Mount Dorothy Reservoir =

- Location within New South Wales Location within Australia
- 33.7978°S 150.9700°E
- Location: Caloola Road, Wentworthville, City of Parramatta, New South Wales, Australia

History
- Built: 1959–1961

Site notes
- Architect(s): MWS & DB
- Owner: Sydney Water

New South Wales Heritage Register
- Official name: Mount Dorothy Reservoir; WS 0073
- Type: state heritage (built)
- Designated: 18 November 1999
- Reference no.: 1329
- Type: Water Supply Reservoir/Dam
- Category: Utilities – Water
- Builders: MWS & DB

Mount Dorothy Reservoir is a heritage-listed reservoir at Caloola Road, Wentworthville, City of Parramatta, New South Wales, Australia. It was designed by the Metropolitan Water Sewerage & Drainage Board and built from 1959 to 1961. It is also known as WS 0073. The property is owned by Sydney Water. It was added to the New South Wales State Heritage Register on 18 November 1999.

== History ==
Mount Dorothy Reservoir was completed in 1961 to meet the increasing need for water in the western suburbs of Sydney, particularly at Wentworthville and Westmead.

Mount Dorothy Reservoir (WS 73) is one of only two reservoirs using prestressed concrete technology to be built by the Metropolitan Water Sewerage & Drainage Board, although a number of similar reservoirs have been taken over by the Board. It was the first in the board's area to employ the technology. The reservoir was also wrapped in a stressed steel wire providing compressive and tensile strength to the walls of the reservoir.

The reservoir was roofed to safeguard water quality in the 1960s or 1970s.

== Description ==
Mount Dorothy Reservoir is a cylindrical prestressed concrete reservoir, built using pre cast panels wrapped around with high tensile steel wire. It has a diameter of 39m and is 7.5m deep. The reservoir has a capacity of 9.3 ML. It is similar in construction to Cecil Park Reservoir (WS 165). Standard features include: concrete apron, davit, trigonometric station, access ladder, handrails and inlet and outlet valve chambers.

It is in substantially intact condition.

== Heritage listing ==
Mount Dorothy Reservoir is an unusual type of reservoir, being built of prestressed concrete. It was the first of its kind built in the Water Board's area of service. It incorporated prestressed concrete blocks for use in the walls of the reservoir and steel wire strapping to counteract the stresses of the water in the reservoir once it was filled. This technology is now widespread, although not extensively used in reservoir construction.

Mount Dorothy Reservoir was listed on the New South Wales State Heritage Register on 18 November 1999 having satisfied the following criteria.

The place is important in demonstrating the course, or pattern, of cultural or natural history in New South Wales.

Mount Dorothy Reservoir was the first reservoir in the Boards area of operations to be built using prestressed concrete. It was constructed to meet the increasing demand for water within the western suburbs of Sydney in the early 1960s.

The place has a strong or special association with a particular community or cultural group in New South Wales for social, cultural or spiritual reasons.

The reservoir provided drinking water to the residents of the western suburbs and as such may be held in some regard by the local community.

The place possesses uncommon, rare or endangered aspects of the cultural or natural history of New South Wales.

This reservoir is one of two reservoirs of its kind in the Boards area of operation.
