= Joseph Joel Hammond =

New Zealand aviator (1886–1918)

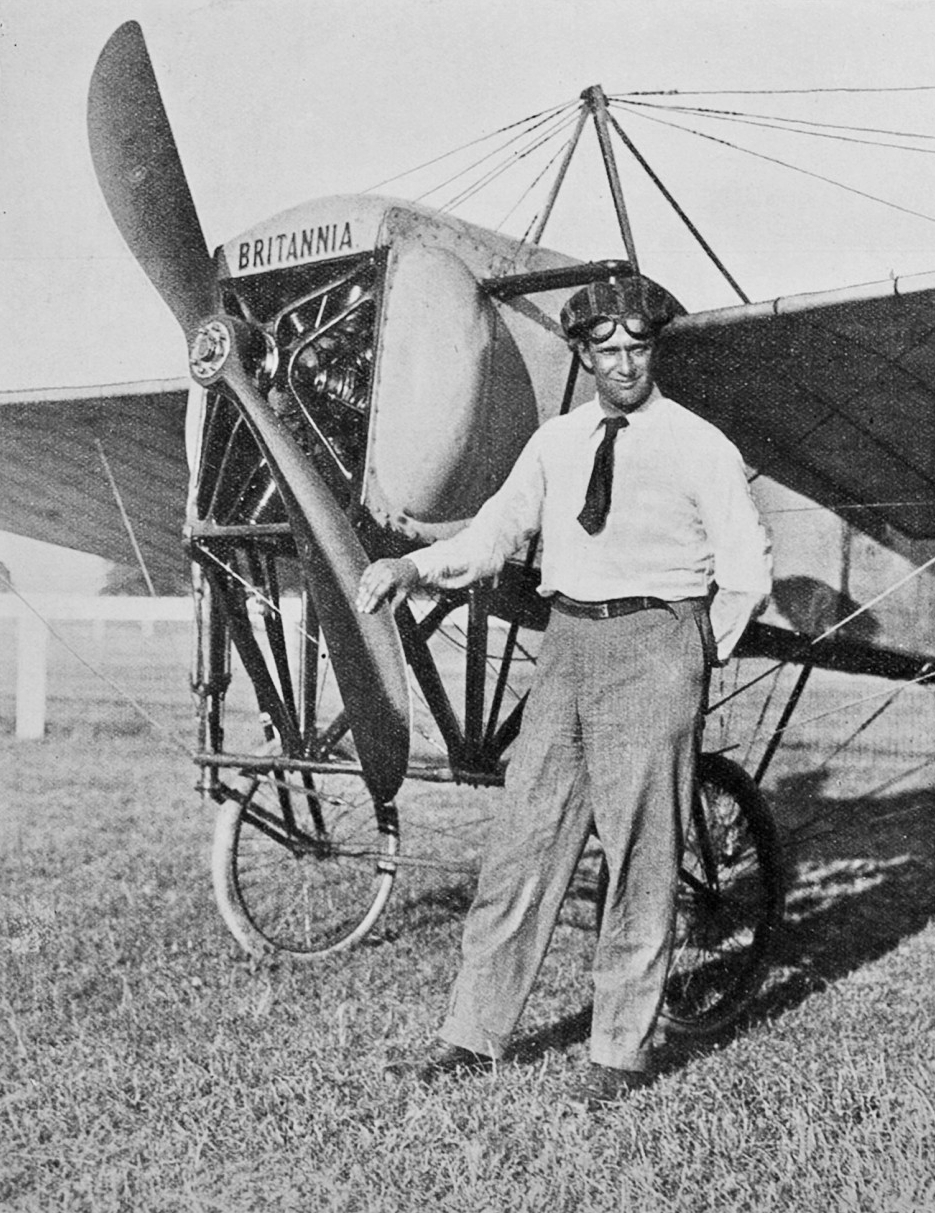
- Hammond c. 1914
- Born: 19 July 1886; Feilding, Manawatu, New Zealand
- Died: 22 September 1918 (aged 32); Indianapolis, Indiana, United States
- Cause of death: Killed in active service
- Resting place: Crown Hill Cemetery and Arboretum, Section 13, Lot 42; 39.8193394°N 86.1756159°W
- Known for: First pilot to fly at Sydney Airport
- Spouse: Ethelwyn Hammond
- Aviation career
- Air force: Royal Air Force, British Air Mission (United States)
- Battles: World War I
- Rank: Captain

Joseph Joel Hammond (19 July 1886 – 22 September 1918) was a pioneering New Zealand aviator. On 17 January 1914 at Epsom showgrounds he took New Zealand's first military plane, a Blériot XI-2, for its first flight.

== Early life ==
Hammond was born in Feilding in the Manawatu District of the North Island of New Zealand, on 19 July 1886. He grew up on his family's farm at Rangitikei, where he attended Carnarvon and Parewanui Schools. He also attended Campbell Street School in Palmerston North, then, during 1899–1901, St Patrick's College, Wellington.

At the age of 18 he left New Zealand for Australia in late 1904. After briefly working on a sheep station, he travelled via Hawaii to work as a gold prospector on the Klondike in Canada. When gold mining proved unprofitable he trapped animals in Alaska before heading south and spending much of 1905 working on a cattle ranch near Phoenix in Arizona.

He left the United States on 20 November, returning to New Zealand for a brief holiday before he returned to the United States via Sydney, Fiji and Hawaii, arriving in Vancouver, Canada on 9 April 1908. He traveled south to the United States and eventually joined William F. Cody, aka Buffalo Bill's Wild West Show and exhibited his horsemanship. Cody's final European tour had ended in 1907 and, in 1908, he and Pawnee Bill, another showman, joined forces and created the "Buffalo Bill's Wild West and Pawnee Bill's Great Far East", popularly known as the "Two Bills" show. After six months with the "Two Bills" show, he left in 1908 and toured much of Europe, apparently using the East Sussex seaside town of Seaford as a base. It was while here that he married Ethelwyn Wilkinson, a local woman in 1909.

== Enters aviation ==
Excited by the development of aviation Hammond obtained some flying tuition from Léon Delagrange, probably at Reims. In July 1910 after attending the second of the famous annual Reims flying meetings, Hammond obtained further instruction from Henri Molla at the Sanchez-Besa school at Mourmelon (Camp de Châlons). As a result, shortly after his marriage Hammond was able to gain from the Aéro-Club de France his French Aviators Certificate (No.258) on 4 October 1910, flying a Sanchez-Besa Biplane. In so doing he became the first New Zealander to obtain a flying certificate. Returning to England he was granted Royal Aero Club aviators certificate 32 on 22 November 1910, after demonstrating his skill flying a Bristol Boxkite at Salisbury Plain.

His new qualifications allowed him to obtain a position as a salesman and demonstration pilot with the British and Colonial Aeroplane Company (later known as the Bristol Aeroplane Company) which was manufacturing the Bristol Boxkite.

== Flights in Australia ==
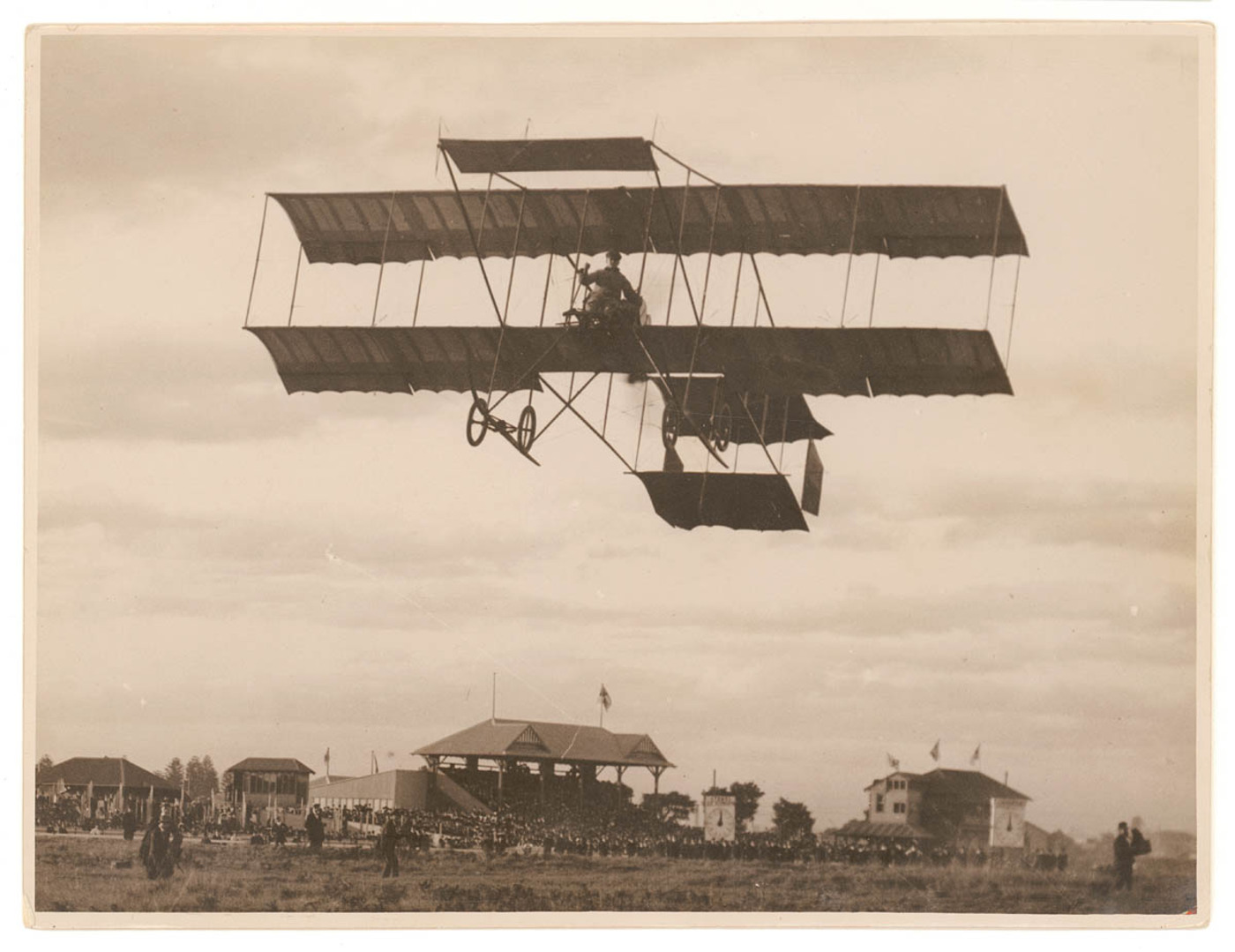
Hammond flying his Bristol Boxkite at Ascot Racecourse (Mascot, NSW) April 1911

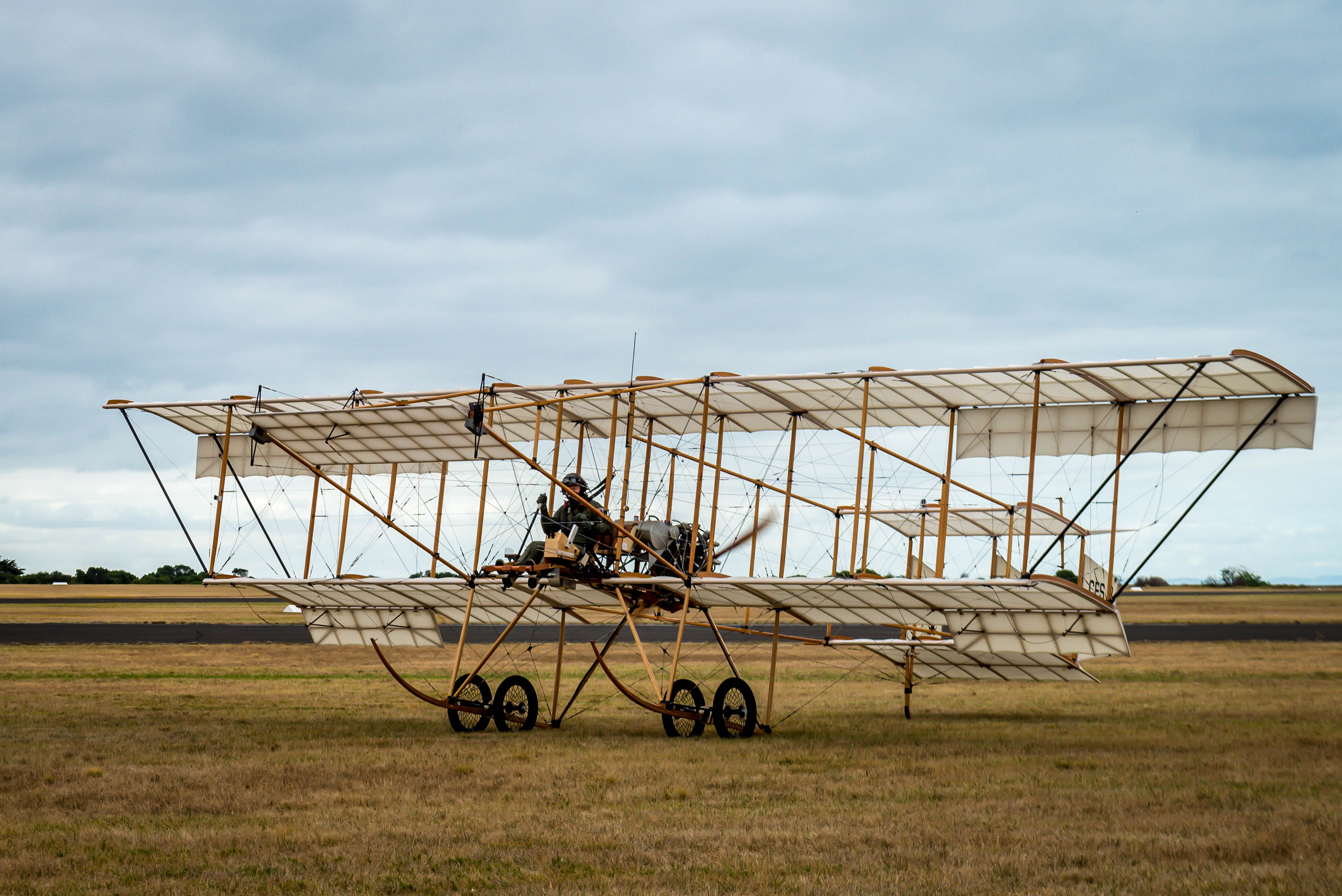
Bristol Boxkite Replica at RAAF Museum

The company sent Hammond – accompanied by his wife, Sydney E. Smith, the company's manager, mechanic/pilot Leslie F. Macdonald and a staff of mechanics as well as two Boxkites – to Australia in an attempt to interest the Australian government in purchasing aircraft for military reconnaissance. Had they been successful, the intention was to establish a factory in Melbourne to build the planes. They disembarked from the R.M.S. Omrah in Fremantle on 13 December 1910 and transferred to Perth. After assembling machine No. 10 Hammond made the first aircraft flight in West Australia from Perth's Belmont Park Racecourse on 3 January 1911.

Hammond made the final of the seven flights he made in Perth on 12 January 1911, after which the aircraft was dismantled and shipped to Melbourne.

Setting up their flight headquarters in Altona, a suburb of Melbourne and reassembling an aircraft, Hammond on 18 February 1911, undertook the aircraft aloft for his first flight in Victoria. On 20 February 1911, he flew from Altona to Geelong and landed on the Geelong Racecourse, taking 55 minutes to cover 42 miles (67.6 km). The following day Hammond returned to Altona, having made the first cross-country flights in Australia.

On 23 February, also from Altona, Hammond made the first passenger flight in Australia, taking Frank Coles, one of the Bristol mechanics, for a 7½ minute flight. Later that same day he took his wife, Ethelwyn for a 12½ minute flight, making her the first woman to fly in Australia.

On 2 March 1911, local businessman M. H. Baillieu paid to be taken for a flight. This 11.8-mile (19.0 km) circular journey was the first paid charter flight and also the first carrying an Australian citizen as a passenger. On 26 March 1911 Hammond flew with both Leslie McDonald and mechanic Coles as passengers to demonstrate the weight carrying performance of the Boxkite. This was the first multiple passenger flight in Australia. Hammond made a total of 40 flights in Melbourne before the team relocated to Sydney.

On 18 April 1911 Hammond made the first-ever flight in Sydney, flying from the site of what would become Sydney Airport. This was the first of several aerial displays and flights for fee-paying passengers over in Sydney.

While official observers from the Australian Army had observed these demonstrations and were also taken for flights, in a further attempt to obtain orders from the military Hammond with a Captain Niechy as passenger flew 20 miles (32 km) on 3 May from Botany Bay at Sydney to a cavalry training camp at Liverpool. He landed in the presence of the governor general, Lord Dudley and Brigadier General J. M. Gordon. The following day he flew Lt Colonel Antill on an observation flight of the Liverpool camp.

During his five months in Australia Hammond flew over 65 flights, some of them with his wife as passenger. Leslie Macdonald gave further demonstration flights in Sydney before the Bristol tour finished on 9 May 1911.

While Hammond was not the first person to fly in Australia, prior to the arrival of the Bristol team the others had only made short hops or flew at very low heights. In comparison, the Boxkite flew higher, further, carried out display flying and took up passengers, all under the complete control of the pilot.

McDonald took a photographer from the Daily Telegraph for a 25-minute flight over Sydney on 6 May, making the first aerial photographs to be taken in Australia. By 19 May, 72 flights totalling 765 miles (1231 km) had been made by No. 10.

Machine No. 11, still in its crate, was sold to Parramatta dentist W.E. Hart, who was given flying lessons by Leslie McDonald. Hart subsequently used the aircraft to become the first Australian to gain an aviator's certificate.

When the Bristol team left for home, Hammond and his wife remained behind and travelled to New Zealand, where Hammond introduced his wife to family and friends. During the holiday Hammond was admitted to hospital, first with appendicitis, followed by a bout of pneumonia and then blood poisoning in the leg. It was six months before he was well enough to travel back to England. Hammond and his wife returned in May 1912 to England by way of Sydney, Vancouver and New York.

== Flights in New Zealand ==
Upon his return to England, Hammond continued working for the British and Colonial Aeroplane Co. until August 1912, when he took a position as an instructor at the Eastbourne Aviation Company's school. On 26 February 1913, Hammond joined the Royal Flying Corps Military Wing with the rank of 2nd lieutenant.

In February 1913 the privately organised Imperial Air Fleet Committee (I.A.F.C.) presented the New Zealand government with a Blériot XI-2. Prior to being gifted to New Zealand, Hamel, with Frank Dupee as passenger, had already flown the aircraft from Dover to Cologne, covering the 340 miles in four hours and 18 minutes. Thomas Mackenzie, the high commissioner for New Zealand, officially received the gift on behalf of New Zealand at Hendon on 22 May 1913 (during which it was christened Britannia by Baroness Ettie Desborough, the wife of the president of the I.A.F.C.). Immediately afterwards former New Zealand premier Joseph Ward, who was present at the presentation, to the disquietude of his wife and daughter was taken for a flight in the machine by Gustav Hamel, followed in a later flight by Baron Desborough before it was disassembled for shipping.

Hammond was subsequently hired on 12 November 1913 to travel to New Zealand and demonstrate the Britannia. The airplane was shipped aboard the SS Athenic and arrived at Wellington, New Zealand, on 29 September without its propeller, which was still back in Hendon, England. Hammond had originally proposed to fly the aircraft to Auckland but was turned down, and instead the military shipped it by train. The propeller subsequently arrived in Wellington on 23 December 1913 on the SS Tainui but was not made available until 7 January 1914, when it was railed to Auckland and fitted to the aircraft.

Once the aircraft was ready Hammond flew a trial flight over Auckland on 18 January 1914 The following day Hammond, with the consent of the military, attempted to take a reporter for a flight, but he had to abort the takeoff and narrowly missed crashing the aircraft into a fence.

The next planned flight was to be over the city's Industrial, Agricultural and Mining exhibition on 29 January. However, on the evening of 28 January 1914, on the spur of the moment, he took Australian actress Esme McLennan of the Royal Pantomime Company on a 20-minute-long flight. McLennan's comments were published in the Poverty Bay Herald:

It was like just nothing I've ever experienced before, and so it's quite hard to tell a real story about it. Mr Hammond is staying at the same hotel, and I expressed a wish to go up if ever he felt inclined to take a passenger. The aviator was not quite sure about the Britannia when it came to carrying a passenger, however, and he would make no promise. On Wednesday I went out with others of our party, after visiting the Exhibition, to see Mr Hammond fly. It was an absolute surprise to me when he said, 'I'll take a passenger; will you come?' I didn't wait to be asked twice, and at once got into the passenger's seat. I honestly didn't feel the least wee bit nervous. On the contrary, the feeling I was most conscious of was one of pleasurable excitement. And, do you know, the first feeling, once away, was how simple and safe it was. I'd somehow pictured aviators as having to be tied in, or having to hold on tight. On the Britannia I never even thought about being frightened, or of being anything else but comfortable and pleased. The machine left the ground so easily, and we mounted into the air so naturally, that it somehow seemed to inspire confidence. It is surprisingly difficult to analyse now what my sensations were. I only know that I was wonderfully elated, and that I just enjoyed every moment of it. From your volcanic cones I have often looked out over Auckland, and thought it the loveliest place in the world, but viewed from an aeroplane, at a height of nearly 2,000ft, it was like a glimpse of something almost unreal. The city itself looked big enough, but the houses, and the people seemed like those Gulliver must have met with on his famous travels. We were travelling faster than I have ever travelled in the fastest express trains, but there was not even the slightest vibration, nor was there any sensation that was other than entirely pleasant. When we can actually journey from one place to another without the fatigue of train travelling or the drawbacks of a sea voyage, how delightful it is going to be. When we descended it was all just equally simple, and apparently equally easy. Coming down the water chute two hours before, my friends had teased me because I was actually scared. Coming down to earth from the skies on the Britannia never gave me one nervous thought. We landed as skilfully and as easily as we went up. I'm sorry I can't describe by experience in more graphic terms, but I'm a woman, and I can best express myself when I use a woman's phrase, and simply say it was 'just lovely'. I was more elated while in the air than I think I've ever been about any first-night success at the theatre, and I really think I'm more excited about it now, when it's all over, than I was while actually in the air.

This unauthorised flight, and especially with an actress instead of a male dignitary, caused consternation among the male politicians and military officials. As a result, no further flights were permitted, and Hammond's contract was terminated for his lapse in protocol. While the aircraft remained on display for the rest of the exhibition, it was later sent back to Wellington and placed in storage in the autumn of 1914. The New Zealand Government offered it for service in World War One, and it returned to the UK in October 1914 with the 1NZEF First Echelon. A replica was built by David Comrie at his home in Dunedin and is now on display in the Air Force Museum of New Zealand at Wigram in Christchurch, New Zealand. The Bleriot is displayed as it would have looked on its exhibition flight, with Hammond in the front and Esme McLennan as his passenger.

== World War I ==
Hammond returned to England arriving in mid-August 1914 and was attached to the Royal Flying Corp as an instructor.

He was posted from 1 Reserve Aeroplane Squadron to France with the Expeditionary Force on 26 February 1915. Less than two months later, on 21 April, he returned to 1 RAS. He also spent another two weeks in France before a posting to 4 RAS in May 1915. There are no records as to whether he saw any action during his time in France.

In March 1915 Hammond was confirmed in his rank of 2nd lieutenant, being promoted to lieutenant the next month, which was later backdated to 26 November 1914. In January 1916 he was promoted from flying officer to flight commander with the rank of captain.

In December 1915 Hammond was transferred to the Aeronautical Inspection Department and throughout 1916 was involved in testing and evaluating new aircraft, among them the Robey-Peters Gun-Carrier. While his maiden flight in the aircraft was successful, during a subsequent flight on 16 September 1916 the engine caught fire, and, unable to reach the airfield at Lincoln, he crash landed in a lunatic asylum. Many onlookers assumed that Hammond had died in the crash, but he was later found having a shave in a barber's shop in Lincoln. During the maiden flight of the second prototype the following year, the aircraft stalled on takeoff and flipped over as it hit the ground, Hammond's life being saved by the size of the tail section.

In 1918 he was attached to the British Aviation Mission which left from Liverpool on 27 March 1918 arrived in New York in April 1918 to advise and promote aviation in the United States. Believing he had a better job in England, Hammond was unhappy with the appointment as his work basically involved giving exhibition flights as part of a joint American-British Liberty Bonds team.

In late May 1918 Hammond had a narrow escape when evaluating a US-designed Standard M-Defence (prototype for the Standard E-I). The machine had previously been test-flown at Mineola, New York, on 21 May by, Lt. C.F Soulier a member of the French Military Mission, who suggested several minor modifications be made to the aircraft. After the modifications had been completed, Hammond attempted to fly the machine from Mineola Field to Washington, D.C., but the engine seized, resulting in it crashing in New Jersey. Hammond walked away from the crash with minor injuries. An investigation later found that Hammond had apparently taken off without checking the oil, and the flight had not been officially authorized.

After giving a flying display during the Fourth Liberty Loan War Bond Drive air display at Greenfield, Hammond was returning to the mission's base at an airfield in Indianapolis on 22 September 1918 in a Bristol Fighter F.2B. In return for the hospitality he had been shown at the air display, he offered a ride to Indianapolis to Lt Roy W. Pickett of the US Army Air Service (who was home on leave) and local businessman John Lawrence Kinder. As the aircraft approached the airfield at about 5:30 pm, it went into a right-hand spin from 600 feet (183 m), its left wing striking a tree before crashing in a cornfield of the Marion County Poor Farm near its boundary with the Indianapolis Motor Speedway. Hammond and Kinder were killed on impact, while Pickett escaped with a broken right leg and a lacerated jaw and shock.

Hammond's funeral was held in Indianapolis with thousands, including a firing squad of American and British aviation officers, attending the ceremony, at which the bishop of Indianapolis officiated. Hammond was cremated and his remains were then stored in the family mausoleum of Carl Fisher, the founder of the Indianapolis speedway. Fisher had donated his own plot in the mausoleum in the expectation that Hammond's family could come and claim the remains after the war. Hammond's remains were never collected and still reside in Carl Fisher's mausoleum at Crown Hill Cemetery in Indianapolis (Section 13, Lot 42).

It is believed that by the time of his death he had accumulated over 6,000 flying hours.

== Personal life ==
On 19 November 1909 he married Ethelwyn Wilkinson (1887–1951) from Seaford. After Hammond's death she moved back home to live with her parents and did not remarry, dying at the age of 64 in Hailsham.

== Legacy ==
By the time of his death Hammond had "become almost a legendary hero" according to the editor of The Aeroplane.

A plaque unveiled on 15 April 2011 at Hammond Place, Mascot honours his 18 April 1911 flight over Sydney. The plaque reads:

On the 18th April 1911, Captain Joseph Joel Hammond, a New Zealander, flew a Bristol box-kite biplane on a flight that lasted less than 10 minutes. Thousands of paying spectators crowded what was then the Ascot Racecourse to see one man in a flying contraption fly a course of about 10 kilometres.
