= 1990 Smithfield state by-election =

Election result for Smithfield, New South Wales, Australia

A by-election was held for the New South Wales Legislative Assembly electorate of Smithfield on 23 June 1990 because of the resignation of Janice Crosio (Labor) to successfully contest the 1990 federal election for Prospect.

The Smithfield by-election was held the same day as the Heffron and Granville by-elections.

== Dates ==
Date	Event
17 February 1990	Resignation of Janice Crosio.
24 March 1990	1990 federal election
25 May 1990	Writ of election issued by the Speaker of the Legislative Assembly and close of electoral rolls.
1 June 1990	Nominations
23 June 1990	Polling day
2 August 1990	Return of writ

== Results ==
1990 Smithfield by-election Saturday 23 June
Party	Candidate	Votes	%	±%
Labor	Carl Scully	16,844	68.5	+7.7
Democrats	Catherine Bateson	3,505	14.3	
Call to Australia	Brian Grigg	1,913	7.8	
Independent	Sandor Torzsok	1,329	5.4	
Independent	Ted Oldfield	996	4.1	
Total formal votes		24,587	95.6	
Informal votes		1,125	4.4	
Turnout		25,712	80.8	
Two-candidate-preferred result
Labor	Carl Scully	18,080	80.2	+19.4
Democrats	Catherine Bateson	4,476	19.8	
Labor hold		Swing	+19.4 (Note: compared to the two-party-preferred result for the 1988 Smithfield election.)	

== See also ==
- Electoral results for the district of Smithfield
- List of New South Wales state by-elections
