= Castrella, New South Wales =

Heritage listed house in Wentworthville, NSW, Australia

Castrella
- Unknown artist's impression of Castrella
- Alternative names: Castrella Heritage Homestead, Castrella villa

General information
- Location: 127-129 Wentworth Avenue, Wentworthville, Parramatta, New South Wales, Australia
- Coordinates: 33.8043°S 150.9675°E
- Construction started: March 1888
- Completed: July 1888
- Owner: William Hart Junior

Technical details
- Floor count: two stores

Castrella is a historical two-storey house, built in 1888, located at 127-129 Wentworth Avenue, Wentworthville, New South Wales. Associated with William Hart Junior and his sons (William Ewart Hart, the early Australian aviator). It is heritage listed by the City of Parramatta for its importance to the area's local history and culture.

When the property was purchased, only Toongabbie and Parramatta train station stops existed. The house stood out on a train trip from Toongabbie to Parramatta. The settlers in the local area at the time were familiar with the house and its inhabitants. Castrella is now visible from the train about half way between Pendle Hill and Wentworthville stations (on the left city bound).

== History ==
William Hart Junior purchased the property from the estate of the late D'Arcy Wentworth.

The estate, called Darcyville, was broken up with the subdivisions of Toongabbee. Toongabbie is one of the oldest suburbs in Western Sydney and map of the first subdivision can be viewed here.

The subdivision was gazetted for sale at auction on 9 November 1886 at 2:30pm.

The property was considered part of the Parramatta region when only the colonies of Toongabbie or Old Toongabbie and Parramatta existed. The suburb name where Castrella is situated is currently designated as Wentworthville.

Castrella is mentioned as a residence “off Hart Drive” which is an important part of the history and development of Greater Sydney and the Parramatta region.

This historic house on Wentworth Avenue were part of the Hart family’s estate. Hart Drive (also called the Cumberland Highway) is a main road situated close to Castrella, at the closest point is 300m from the house to the end of Wentworth Ave which intersects Hart Drive. Hart Drive was named after the Hart family.

In March 1911, Castrella was sold to Martin Rowland Shannon, a barrister where he, his wife and his son resided

== History of the residents and Uses of Castrella ==
William Hart (1830–1910) arrived in Australia from England at the age of 24 and worked as a builder and timber merchant starting the company Hart & Sons and residing in the Parramatta region. His son William (1855-1937) commissioned the building of Castrella. William Hart (Junior) worked in the family business and had Darcy road Parramatta as his listed residence at the time when the famous aviator William Ewart Hart “Bill Hart” was born. William Hart Senior (grandfather of Bill Hart) was the founder of Hart & Sons and may have had a hand in the planning and construction of Castrella.

William Hart (Junior)’s son, William Ewart Hart, “Bill Hart” was a pioneer Australian aviator and possibly spent time at Castrella. William Hart Junior was known to be a philanthropist and supported his son and the Australian aviation industry financially.

The same trees/timbers may have been used in Castrella as the first cross-country plane flight in NSW (1911). It was believed at the time that it was the first cross-country flight in Australia, however Joseph Hammond flew cross-country in Victoria earlier in 4 February of the same year. The Penrith to Parramatta flight William Ewart Hart (“Bill Hart”) on the 4 November 1911 was to meet his father, the builder of Castrella, for breakfast. The plane was reconstructed using the Australian timbers at the family’s expense after windy, stormy weather destroyed the tent and the plane housed in it in September 1911. Bill Hart is also responsible for the first official plane crash in Australia in 1912 at the train line between Mount Druitt and Rooty Hill due to inclement weather and slightly clipping the railway signal. The plane was repaired (again using the family timbers), and went on to race.

From March 1911, when Castrella was sold to Martin Rowland Shannon, a barrister, it appears that Castrella was used as their residence for some time. Martin Rowland Shannon and his son Rowland Maurice Shannon listed “Castrella” as their address in 1916. Rowland Maurice Shannon was a draftsman and was enlisted in the army “9th Field Company Engineers” in 1916.

There are two historic houses on Wentworth Avenue, the properties of both previously belonging to the Wentworth family as part of the Darcyville estate. The other house’s actual address is on Fryer Avenue. This historic house next to Castrella is “Tralee Gardens Preschool Centre”. There may have been a connection between the two houses in later times with Castrella operating as a guesthouse while the family that lived in Tralee managed the operations and undertakings at Castrella. Castrella may have been a guesthouse or boardinghouse (post 1924).

Castrella was locally known in later years as “the White House”, was painted a historic colour in c.2022 in consultation with heritage specialists. The goal was to make the heritage home stand out from its surroundings and that this colour is an heritage colour, according to conservation management plans.

== Architecture ==
The building is considered by heritage specialists to be a “rare example of a late Victorian Italianate villa”.

Castrella is a late Victorian house made and is double-storey. This house has rendered masonry and a bay window projecting at the front gable.

Castrella is described on the NSW heritage listing as having “a gabled roof clad with slate, terracotta ridge capping and decorated bargeboards. The verandah and balcony at the front of the building have cast iron fluted posts and lace balustrade, frieze/valance and brackets. The building's facade with ashlar markings has a faceted bay in gable, topped by a louvred round ventilator below the gable fascia. The two tall rendered brick chimneys have stepped decorations. The verandah floor is concrete on ground floor, and timber on the first floor. The windows have rendered brick sills with bracket decoration and rectangular niches below. The front door has transom light and half glazed sidelights with dentils below.”

== Materials ==
The bricks are solid and stamped. This style of bricks is often described as the “convict” style. Bricks of this period in early Australian colonialism were solid and often contained a stamp to assist the mortar stick or bind more effectively and provide suction. Shapes used included hearts, diamonds, spades and the name of the brick manufacturer. Castrella bricks are thought to have a heart based key shape.

The outside cistern and the house are made of bricks. The way the bricks were laid for the outside cistern is in a concave pattern.

Some of the walls were also laid in a concave manner. This concave brick laying technique assisted the building to have the strength to last the test of time. Castrella has rendering which overlays the bricks (the heritage name for rendering is “plaster”).

Original timbers in the floor and the staircase were likely to have been locally sourced and milled via the Hart & Sons family business of local Australian quality timber.
