= Andrew Rohan =

Australian politician (born 1948)

Councillor Andrew Rohan
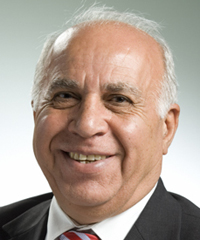

Councillor of the Fairfield City Council
- Incumbent
- Assumed office 4 December 2021

Member of the New South Wales Parliament for Smithfield
- In office 26 March 2011 – 28 March 2015
- Preceded by: Ninos Khoshaba
- Succeeded by: Seat abolished

Personal details
- Born: 30 June 1948 (age 78) Habbaniyah, Iraq
- Party: Australian Women's Party (since 2021)
- Other political affiliations: Liberal Party (suspended in 2016)
- Spouse: Janet Rohan
- Education: University of Baghdad
- Occupation: Politician
- Profession: Petroleum geologist
- Ethnicity: Assyrian

Andrew Baijan Rohan (Arabic: أندرو روهان; born 30 June 1948 in Iraq) is an Australian politician of Assyrian descent who currently serves on Fairfield City Council. He was previously a member of the New South Wales Legislative Assembly, representing Smithfield for the Liberal Party from 2011 to 2015.

== Early years and background ==
Born in Iraq, Rohan completed studies in petroleum geology at the University of Baghdad, graduating with a Bachelor of Science (Geology) in 1970 and a Master of Science (Petroleum Geology) in 1975. Migrating to Australia in 1979, he initially worked as a petroleum geologist for Robertson Research before establishing his own printing business in 1995.

Elected as a Councillor to Fairfield City Council in 2008, Rohan was President of the Smithfield branch, and Smithfield SEC of the Liberal Party between 2003 and 2011.

== Political career ==
At the 2011 state election, Rohan was elected to the normally safe Labor seat with a swing of 18.8 points and won the seat with 54.8 per cent of the two-party vote. His main opponent was the then incumbent sitting member, Ninos Khoshaba, representing Labor. Since the seat was first created in 1988, Rohan's win was the first time the seats has been held by the Liberals. Smithfield was abolished in 2015, mostly replaced by Prospect. Rohan attempted to transfer there, but was defeated.

In August 2016, Rohan was suspended from the Liberal Party after announcing his run for Fairfield City Council as an Independent against the endorsed Liberal candidates.

Rohan was elected to the City of Fairfield as a councillor in 2021 as a member of the Australian Women's Party.

New South Wales Legislative Assembly
| Preceded by Ninos Khoshaba | Member for Smithfield; 2011–2015 | Abolished |
