= Carl Scully =

Australian politician

Member of the New South Wales Parliament for Smithfield
- In office 23 June 1990 – 27 March 2007
- Preceded by: Janice Crosio
- Succeeded by: Ninos Khoshaba
Minister 1995–2006
Minister for Police
In office 21 January 2005 – 26 October 2006
Premier	Bob Carr; Morris Iemma
Preceded by	John Watkins
Succeeded by	John Watkins
Minister for Utilities
In office 3 August 2005 – 17 February 2006
Premier	Morris Iemma
Preceded by	Frank Sartor (as Minister for Energy and Utilities)
Succeeded by	Joe Tripodi (as Minister for Energy); David Campbell (as Minister for Water Utilities)
Minister for Housing
In office 2 April 2003 – 1 February 2005
Premier	Bob Carr
Preceded by	Andrew Refshauge
Succeeded by	Joe Tripodi
Minister for Roads
In office 28 November 1996 – 21 January 2005
Premier	Bob Carr
Preceded by	Michael Knight
Succeeded by	Michael Costa
Minister for Transport
In office 1 December 1997 – 2 April 2003
Premier	Bob Carr
Preceded by	Brian Langton
Succeeded by	Michael Costa (as Minister for Transport Services)
Minister for Small Business and Regional Development
In office 4 April 1995 – 15 December 1997
Premier	Bob Carr
Preceded by	Ian Armstrong
Succeeded by	Michael Egan (as Minister for State and Regional Development)
Minister for Ports
In office 4 April 1995 – 1 December 1997
Premier	Bob Carr
Preceded by	Ian Armstrong
Succeeded by	Kim Yeadon
Minister for Public Works and Services
In office 15 December 1995 – 1 December 1997
Premier	Bob Carr
Preceded by	Michael Knight
Succeeded by	Ron Dyer

Personal details
- Born: Patrick Carl Scully; 4 April 1957 (age 69) Sydney, New South Wales
- Party: Labor
- Spouse: Ann Leaf
- Education: Macquarie University

Patrick Carl Scully (born 4 April 1957), is an Australian former politician. A member of the Australian Labor Party, he was a member of the Parliament of New South Wales for Smithfield from 1990 to 2007. Scully served as a minister in the New South Wales Government before his forced resignation on 25 October 2006.

== Background and early career ==
Scully was born in Sydney and educated at state schools. He graduated in law from Macquarie University, Sydney, and was active in the Labor Party since 1976. He practised as a solicitor between 1983 and 1990.

== Political career ==
Scully was elected to the New South Wales Legislative Assembly as member for the safe Labor seat of Smithfield at the 1990 by-election. He is a member of the dominant right-wing faction of the New South Wales Labor Party.

Scully held the ministerial portfolios of small business and regional development (1995), state development (1995), public works and services (1995–97), roads and transport (1997–2003), housing (2003–05) and police (2005–06).

Scully was considered a possible candidate to replace Bob Carr as Premier of New South Wales, and announced his intention to run for the position after Carr announced his resignation in July 2005. But he withdrew from the contest on 29 July when it became clear that health minister Morris Iemma had majority support in the Labor Caucus. Although Scully publicly blamed the party machine for working against him, it was reported that some Labor MPs feared his record as transport minister during the Waterfall train disaster and other problems would have worked against the party at the next state election if he were leader.

Then, as police minister, it was revealed that he misled parliament over a report into the 2005 Cronulla riot, and as a result was ultimately asked to resign by the NSW Premier.

Scully did not recontest Smithfield at the 2007 state election; and claimed he rejected an offer from Labor to contest a federal seat. In 2013, Scully testified that he was disappointed that Eddie Obeid, a powerbroker, had orchestrated Iemma becoming premier instead of Scully himself.

== Post political career ==
In 2017, Scully released his autobiography titled Setting the Record Straight.

In response to Scully's autobiography, journalist Emma Jones wrote an article for The Australian, “Revealed: secret plan to blow up the Harbour Bridge". In this article, Jones discusses how Scully's autobiography makes mention of a secret plan from World War II, which explained how best to blow up the Sydney Harbour Bridge during an invasion from the North. Scully used the secret plan during his time in government, to assist in protecting the Sydney Harbour Bridge from terrorism after the September 11 terrorist attacks.

New South Wales Legislative Assembly
Preceded by Janice Crosio	Member for Smithfield; 1990 – 2007	Succeeded by Ninos Khoshaba
