= Wentworthville =

- Suburb
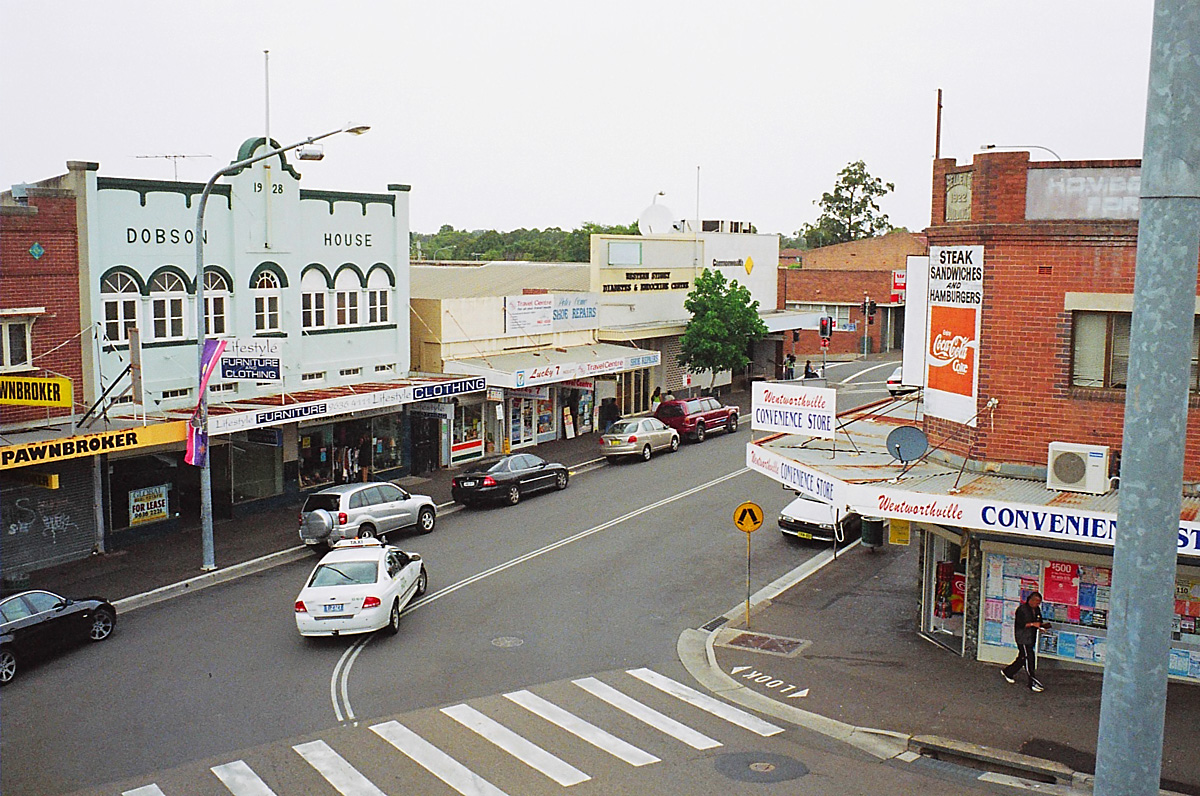
- View from the railway footbridge

- Interactive map of Wentworthville
- Country: Australia
- State: New South Wales
- City: Sydney
- LGAs: City of Parramatta; Cumberland City Council
- Location: 27 km (17 mi) west of Sydney CBD
- Established: 1810

Government
  - State electorates: Granville; Prospect; Winston Hills
  - Federal division: Parramatta

Area
  - Total: 3.1 km^{2} (1.2 sq mi)
- Elevation: 30 m (98 ft)

Population
  - Total: 15,098 (2021 census)
  - Density: 4,870/km^{2} (12,610/sq mi)
- Postcode: 2145
Suburbs around Wentworthville
Toongabbie	Old Toongabbie	Northmead
Pendle Hill	Wentworthville	Westmead
Greystanes	South Wentworthville	Mays Hill

Wentworthville is a suburb of Sydney, in the state of New South Wales, Australia. Wentworthville is located 27 kilometres west of the Sydney central business district and is part of the Greater Western Sydney region. Wentworthville is split between the local government areas of the City of Parramatta and the Cumberland Council. Wentworthville is colloquially known as 'Wenty'.

== History ==
=== Original custodians of the land ===
The Dharug of Durag peoples are the traditional custodians of the land, specifically the Boolbainora clan. These people usually lived around the formerly flourishing river system in Western Sydney. These waterways are now a system of creeks that are small and often completely dried up. The developments in Western Sydney made it impossible for these peoples to continue their lifestyle in the traditional way.

=== Early land grants and developments ===
After explorers passed through Western Sydney in a series of expeditions in 1788, one of which is recorded in April 1788 would have passed through what is now Wentworthville. The towns of Parramatta and Toongabbie (spelt at the time “Toongabbee”) were established as early settlements in 1788.

James Ruse was the first person to officially be granted land in 1791. The land parcels included around the Parramatta area, paving the way for future developments and land grants.

D’Arcy Wentworth received land grants to assist with the food needs of the growing Sydney Colony. He was a medical surgeon, a colonial and landowner, encouraging public farming as well as private merchant farming and supervised much of the development and activities in Western Sydney.

Some time after the death of Mr D'Arcy Wentworth, the Darcyville estate was progressively divided up (from approx. 1885 onwards) by various auctions and subdivisions. Prior to this, Wentworthville was not a suburb in existence at this time. There were no residences there at the time and it was considered part of the “Parramatta” region.

=== Early history and subdivisions ===
In the mid-1800s, a land boom attracted people into the area, land was subdivided for housing and small farms. Wentworth's holdings were sub-divided – amounting to 600 lots. The railway line had been put through on its way to Penrith, in 1864, but it was not until 1883 that Wentworthville got its own public railway station. Originally the railway station was called T. R. Smith's Platform but was renamed Wentworthville two years later.

By the time of the 1886 auction of the 2nd subdivision of “Toongabbee” (spelt differently today) of the Darcyville estate, there were two railway stops marked on the map, “Toongabbee” and leading to “Parramatta”. This subdivision allowed individual merchants and farmers to become landowners. The 2nd subdivision contains part of the Wentworthville area (north of the train line between today’s Toongabbie station and Hart Road). Darcyville included the area around Wentworthville station to the north and west.

Part of the modern suburb of Wentworthville was Lot 12 of division 8 of the 2nd subdivision was purchased by William Hart (Junior) of the timber and building company Hitchcock and Co. In 1888 the historic house of “Castrella” belonging to the Hart family was constructed and is still visible today from Wentworth Avenue. Down from Castrella, next door is the historic house where the Tralee Gardens Preschool Centre is located. You can find these historic houses towards the top of the hill in Wentworth Avenue or by looking to the left of (City bound) from the train window about halfway between Pendle hill and Wentworthville stations.

The T. R. Smith's Platform or “Wentworthville” train station is not drawn on the 1902 Parish of at John map but was likely to be in existence. The Westmead station is included and the Fullagar estates around Westmead on this map.

The 1902 map of the Parish of St John shows the Darcyville estate as including the area around the Wentworthville train station including Railway St and Short St on the other side of Hart Drive. An early map shows the Darcyville estate subdivision plan to encourage growth and development in the area. The 1918 map shows business sites nearby to the Wentworthville station available for sale. More residential sites near the station were available in 1919. With more residents and more businesses in the area, Wentworthville was growing.

The Fullagar estates were large around Westmead and include parts of what we now call Wentworthville. William Fullagar established the Star Inn in what is now Greystanes i.e. on the corner of Ettalong Road and the Western Road (now the Great Western Highway). Fullagar also opened a cattle saleyard which became one of the principal ones for the colony. His family's estate "Essington House" (Westmead) is now the site of a Christian school. Sales of the Fullagar estates lead to more individual and family ownership in the area.

== Boundaries and council areas (Parramatta and Cumberland) ==
In 2007 the boundaries were redrawn and the northern part of Wentworthville became the suburb of Constitution Hill.

Wentworthville became its own suburb in the Greater Western Sydney region in time. Part of Wentworthville is under the local government area of the City of Parramatta and the other part of the suburb belongs to Cumberland Council. One of the borders being the train line and Wentworth Avenue North as inside Parramatta Council area.

== The name: Wentworthville ==
Wentworthville, Wentworth Falls in the Blue Mountains and, Wentworth in far western New South Wales, were named after the Wentworth family. A land grant of 2000 acres (8 km^{2}) in this area was made in 1810 to D'Arcy Wentworth, the father of William Wentworth, the famous Australian explorer, barrister, newspaper publisher, politician and landowner.

== Street names ==
- Fullagar Road (Wentworthville) is named after Mr Fullagar, there were many subdivisions that belonged to the Fullagar estate
- Fyall Avenue Wentworthville is most probably named after the Fyall family, Alexander Fyall was originally from Scotland, coming to Australia when he was 19 years old; this family held some government and community positions
- Darcy Road, Wentworth Ave after D’Arcy Wentworth
- Hart Drive (now the Cumberland Hwy.) after the Hart family (including William Hart Junior), whose family built the historic house of "Castrella”
- Obriens road probably after the fruit stall owned by this family
- Dorothy Road, possibly named after the “Dorothy mount estate” subdivision or could have reference to the granddaughter of William Charles Wentworth

See the Parramatta council site for more references to street names

== History sites ==
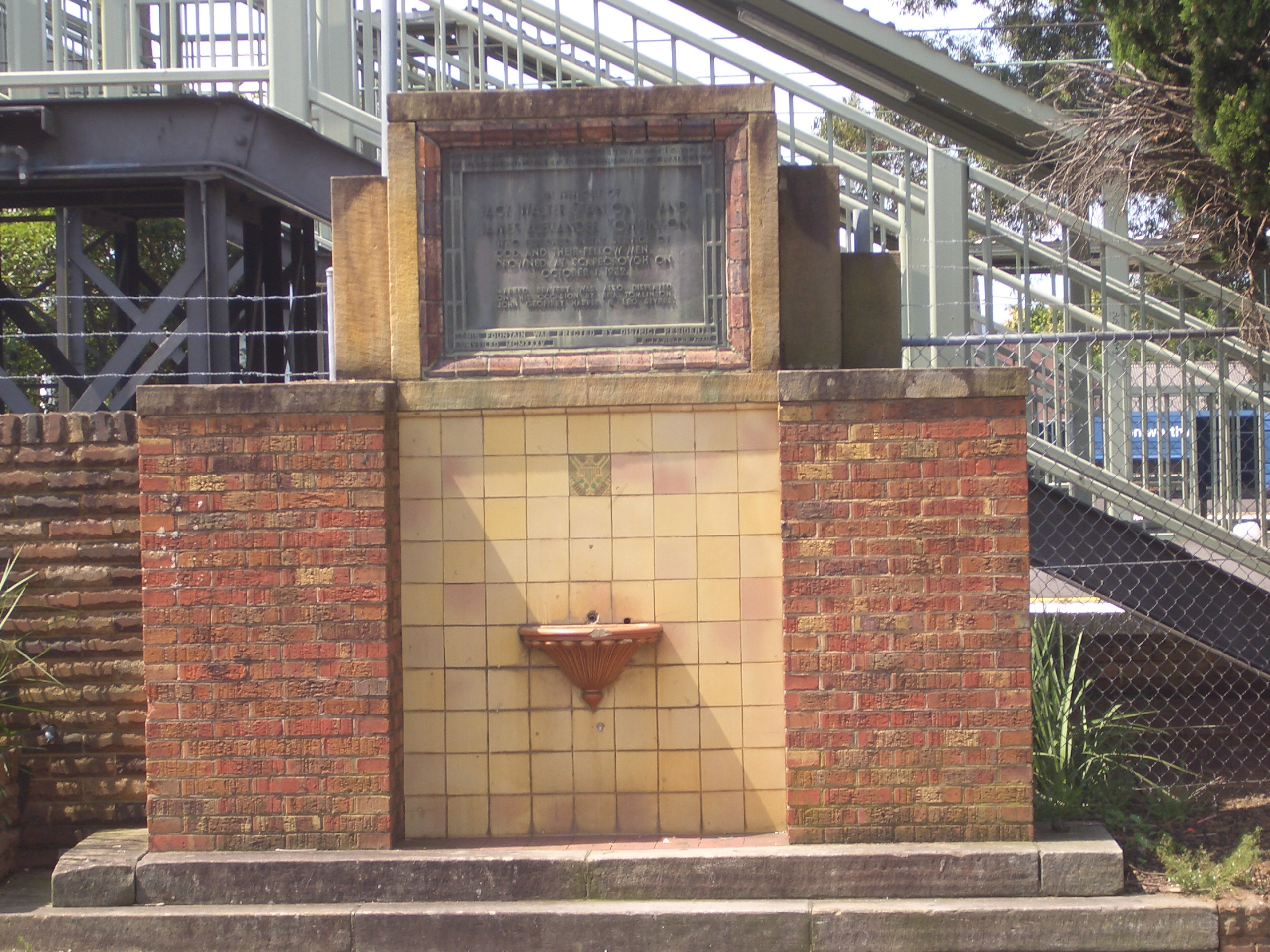
Wentworthville War Memorial

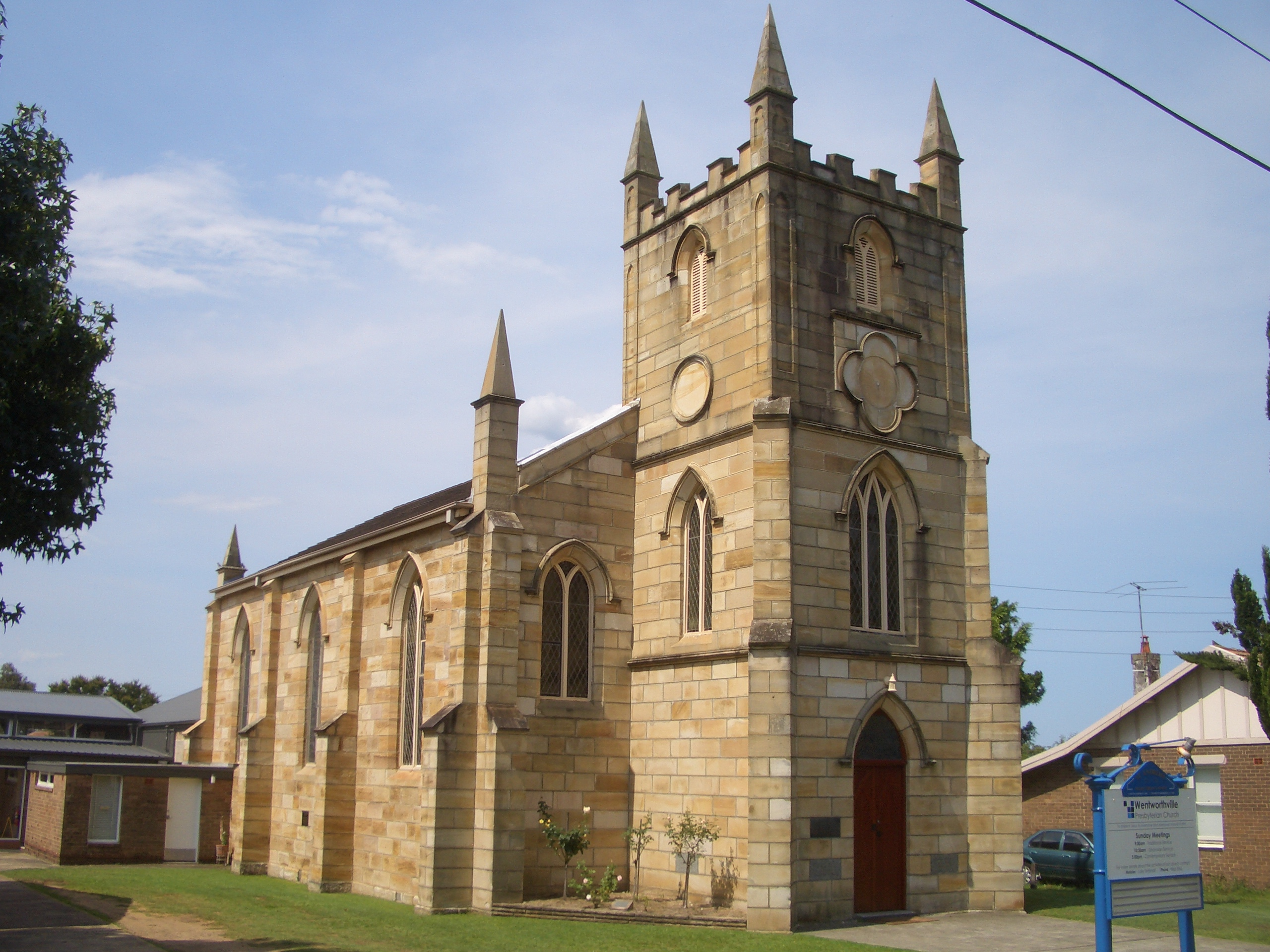
Wentworthville Presbyterian Church

== Heritage listings ==
Wentworthville has a number of heritage-listed sites, including:

- Caloola Road: Mount Dorothy Reservoir (located on the edge of Wentworthville and Constitution Hill suburbs)
- ”Castrella”: Homestead of William Hart Junior (located on the North side of the train line in Wentworth Avenue)

== Commercial area ==
Wentworthville has two shopping precincts. The larger, older precinct sits on the Cumberland Council side of Wentworthville railway station (the other side of the railway is part of City of Parramatta Council local government area and is mainly zoned residential). A Supa IGA (formerly Franklins) dominated Wentworthville Mall Shopping Centre until late 2017 when it closed.

The newer commercial centre is on the Great Western Highway. It is dominated by Woolworths. Initially Woolworths operated in the main shopping precinct, but new premises were obtained at their present location in the late 1980s. An Aldi sits on the other side of the Highway which is part of South Wentworthville.

For many years shopping tours were conducted to the Wentworthville area for the factory-outlets selling their products directly to the public. Bonds clothing factory in Dunmore Street sold direct to the public from their factory. Clothing factory later closed.

== Demographics ==
The most common ancestries in Wentworthville were Indian 31.5%, English 8.8%, Australian 8.0%, Chinese 6.2% and Lebanese 3.2%.

29.4% of people were born in Australia. The most common other countries of birth were India 35.7%, Sri Lanka 5.6%, China 3.2%, Nepal 2.4% and Philippines 2.0%. 23.2% of people only spoke English at home. Other languages spoken at home included Tamil 11.5%, Telugu 8.6%, Hindi 7.9%, Gujarati 7.1% and Punjabi 4.8%.

The most common responses for religion were Hinduism 43.2%, Catholic 14.2% and No Religion 10.8%.

== Transport ==
=== Trains ===
Wentworthville railway station is on the North Shore & Western Line of the Sydney Trains network that connects west to Penrith and Richmond. After reaching the city, most trains continue north to North Sydney, Chatswood, Hornsby and Berowra. The station is also serviced by the Cumberland Line linking Richmond to Leppington. The trip to Sydney CBD typically takes 35 minutes.

The Wentworthville station was the site of the first major Tangara accident, a derailment, which occurred on 27 December 1989.

=== Buses ===
East of Old Prospect Road, the Liverpool–Parramatta T-way runs along the southern boundary. The North-West T-way runs just outside the suburb boundaries on Mons Road.

Transit Systems runs route 818 from Westmead Hospital to Merrylands via Wentworthville railway station.

CDC NSW runs the following routes

- 700 from Blacktown to Parramatta via Wentworthville – running along the southern border of the suburb
- 705 also running from Blacktown to Parramatta but via Wentworthville railway station.
- 711 runs from the non-shop side of Wentworthville station, from Blacktown to Parramatta
- 708 from Parramatta to Constitution Hill via Wentworthville railway station.

=== Roads ===
The M4 Western Motorway and the parallel Great Western Highway run east–west through the southern side. The Cumberland Highway runs through the western side of Wentworthville on its way south (from Hornsby via the Pennant Hills Road to Liverpool).

== Schools ==
- Wentworthville Public School
- Our Lady of Mt Carmel Primary School
- Darcy Road Public School
- Westmead Christian Grammar School (previously Essington Christian Academy)

== Sport ==
Wentworthville is home to local rugby league team the Wentworthville Magpies (feeder club for Parramatta Eels), who play in the Jim Beam Cup and the NSW Cup (winning the 2008 NSW Cup), though the nearest NRL team is the nearby Parramatta Eels.

== Other facilities ==
- Library – as part of the Cumberland Council library service
- Swimming – Wentworthville Swimming Pool operates near the railway station
