= Ninos Khoshaba =

Iraqi-born Australian politician

Councillor Ninos Khoshaba

Member of the New South Wales Parliament for Smithfield
- In office 24 March 2007 – 26 March 2011
- Preceded by: Carl Scully
- Succeeded by: Andrew Rohan

Personal details
- Born: 24 March 1970 (age 56) Iraq
- Party: Labor
- Children: 3

Ninos Khoshaba (born March 24, 1970) is an Australian politician of Assyrian descent, and is a former member of Parliament of New South Wales. He was a member of Parliament from 24 March 2007 until 26 March 2011, when he lost his seat to Andrew Rohan of the Liberal Party. Khoshaba currently serves as a member of Fairfield City Council, and has represented the ward of Parks since his election in 2012. He previously served in this capacity from 2004 until resigning in 2008 following his election to parliament.

== Early life ==
Born in Iraq on 24 March 1970, Khoshaba is the eldest of three children to parents Anwar Khoshaba and Athour Khoshaba. He migrated from Iraq to Australia in 1970 when only four months old. His father worked as a bulldozer driver and in 1991 his father was elected as a councillor on Fairfield City Council. His father eventually became the Mayor of Fairfield and was the first mayor of Assyrian background in Australia. His father was awarded the Order of Australia medal in 2000.

He attended Our Lady of the Rosary Primary School in Fairfield and St Johns Park High School.

== Political career ==
In March 2004, he was elected as a councillor on Fairfield City Council, following his father's footsteps. In October 2004, he became an electorate officer working for the federal member for Prospect Chris Bowen.

He was elected to the New South Wales Parliament in the 2007 New South Wales state election for the seat of Smithfield. He was Deputy Chair of the Standing Committee on Public Works and a member of the Public Accounts Committee. In the 2011 New South Wales state election, Khoshaba lost his seat to Andrew Rohan after suffering a 19.9% swing.

== Personal ==
Khoshaba is married and has three children

New South Wales Legislative Assembly
Preceded by Carl Scully	Member for Smithfield; 2007–2011	Succeeded by Andrew Rohan
