= Electoral district of Prospect =

State electoral district of New South Wales, Australia

Prospect New South Wales—Legislative Assembly
- Interactive map of district boundaries from the 2023 state election
- State: New South Wales
- Created: 2015
- MP: Hugh McDermott
- Party: Labor
- Namesake: Prospect
- Electors: 58,840 (2023)
- Area: 70.6 km^{2} (27.3 sq mi)
- Demographic: Outer metropolitan
Electorates around Prospect:
Blacktown	Winston Hills; Blacktown	Winston Hills
Badgerys Creek	Prospect	Granville
Badgerys Creek	Cabramatta	Fairfield

Prospect is an electoral district of the Legislative Assembly in the Australian state of New South Wales. An urban electorate in Western Sydney, it is centred on the suburb of Prospect from which it takes its name.

Prospect has been represented by Hugh McDermott of the Labor Party since it was established in 2015.

== History ==
Prospect was created as a result of the 2013 redistribution and largely replaced the abolished electorate of Smithfield.

== Geography ==
On its current boundaries, Prospect includes the suburbs of Girraween, Pemulwuy, Prospect, Wetherill Park, as well as parts of Blacktown, Eastern Creek, Fairfield West, Greystanes, Pendle Hill, Prairiewood, Seven Hills, Smithfield, Smithfield West, South Wentworthville, Toongabbie and Wentworthville.

== Members for Prospect ==
Member	Party	Term
Hugh McDermott	Labor	2015–present

== Election results ==
2023 New South Wales state election: Prospect
Party	Candidate	Votes	%	±%
Labor	Hugh McDermott	24,519	49.3	−1.0
Liberal	Kalvin Biag	17,903	36.0	−0.3
Greens	Sujan Selventhiran	3,610	7.3	+2.5
Sustainable Australia	Peter Shafer	1,892	3.8	+3.8
Animal Justice	Emily Walsh	1,775	3.6	+1.1
Total formal votes		49,699	95.4	−0.5
Informal votes		2,375	4.6	+0.5
Turnout		52,074	88.5	+1.2
Two-party-preferred result
Labor	Hugh McDermott	27,175	58.7	+0.1
Liberal	Kalvin Biag	19,137	41.3	−0.1
Labor hold		Swing	+0.1	
