= Electoral district of Smithfield =

Former state electoral district of New South Wales, Australia

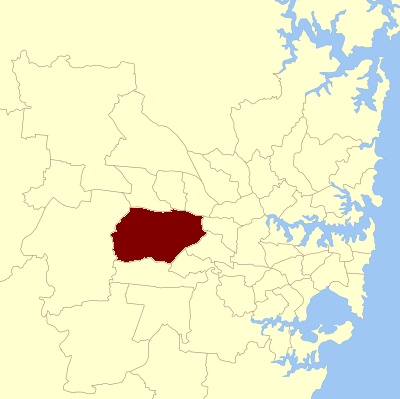
Location within Sydney

Smithfield was an electoral district of the Legislative Assembly in the Australian state of New South Wales from 1988 to 2015. It was abolished in 2015 and largely replaced by Prospect.

== Members for Smithfield ==
Member	Party	Term
Janice Crosio	Labor	1988—1990
Carl Scully	Labor	1990—2007
Ninos Khoshaba	Labor	2007—2011
Andrew Rohan	Liberal	2011—2015

== Election results ==
2011 New South Wales state election: Smithfield
Party	Candidate	Votes	%	±%
Liberal	Andrew Rohan	21,443	46.3	+18.8
Labor	Ninos Khoshaba	17,323	37.4	−14.9
Greens	Astrid O'Neill	3,818	8.3	+0.1
Christian Democrats	Manny Poularas	3,680	8.0	+2.5
Total formal votes		46,264	94.6	−0.7
Informal votes		2,661	5.4	+0.7
Turnout		48,925	94.5	
Two-party-preferred result
Liberal	Andrew Rohan	23,009	54.8	+20.3
Labor	Ninos Khoshaba	18,948	45.2	−20.3
Liberal gain from Labor		Swing	+20.3	
