= Members of the New South Wales Legislative Council, 1925–1927 =

Members of the New South Wales Legislative Council who served from 1925 to 1927 were appointed for life by the Governor on the advice of the Premier. This list includes members between the 1925 state election on 30 May 1925 and the 1927 state election on 8 October 1927. The President was Fred Flowers. The Labor platform included the abolition of the Legislative Council. At the opening of the new parliament on 24 June 1925 there were 75 members of the council, with just 23 Labor members and Premier Jack Lang had been seeking to appoint 25 new members, however the Governor Sir Dudley de Chair had declined to do so in September 1925. In December the Governor agreed to make the appointments in circumstances that are disputed. De Chair understood there was an agreement that the appointments would not be used to abolish the Legislative Council, while Lang said he gave no such undertaking. All 25 appointees took the pledge to implement the Labor platform, "including the abolition of the Legislative Council", similar to that signed by other Labor members.

In January 1926 Albert Willis, the Representative of the Government in the Legislative Council sought leave to introduce the Constitution (Amendment) Bill (No. 2) that would abolish the Legislative Council, which was granted 45 votes to 43. Parliament was prorogued to gain a tactical advantage by cancelling pair agreements while 3 opponents of abolition were out of the country, which caused the bill to lapse. Willis sought leave to resume debate on the bill however this was defeated by 47 votes to 41. Two Labor members had voted against the bill, Frank Bryant and John Percival. A further six Labor members were absent from the chamber, Carl Akhurst, Percy Hordern, William Kelly, James Lyons, Thomas Murray and Duncan Smith. Hordern had leave as he was seriously ill and died on 1 April 1926. Bryant and Percival immediately resigned from the Labor party however on 5 March 1926 the party executive refused to accept their resignations and expelled them instead. The five members who had been absent without cause were required to justify why they should not be expelled, and the party conference held on 10 April 1926 voted to expel them. 4 non Labor members were also absent, Alexander Brown was seriously ill and died on 28 March 1926, John Wetherspoon's wife died the previous day, while Sir Owen Cox and Norman Kater were out of the country.

Name	Party	Years in office
William Ainsworth (Note: William Ainsworth was appointed on 21 December 1925, and took his seat on 22 December 1925.)	Labor	1925–1934
Carl Akhurst (Note: 25 members were appointed on 21 December 1925 with 23 taking their seats the same day.) (Note: Carl Akhurst, William Kelly, James Lyons, Thomas Murray and Duncan Smith were absent when the bill to abolish the Legislative Council was voted on and were expelled from the Labor party on 10 April 1926.)	Labor / Independent	1925–1934
Alexander Alam	Labor	1925–1958, 1963–1973
George Archer	Labor	1925–1949
James Ashton	Nationalist	1907–1934
George Black	Nationalist	1917–1934
Reginald Black	Nationalist	1900–1928
Francis Boyce	Nationalist	1923–1932
Sir Henry Braddon	Nationalist	1917–1940
William Brennan	Labor	1925–1934
Charles Bridges	Labor	1925–1937, 1940–1943
William Brooks	Nationalist	1917–1934
Alexander Brown (Note: Alexander Brown died on 28 March 1926.)	Nationalist	1892–1926
Joseph Browne	Independent	1912–1932
Frank Bryant (Note: Frank Bryant and John Percival voted against the bill to abolish the Legislative Council and were expelled from the Labor party on 6 March 1926.)	Labor / Nationalist	1912–1934
Nicholas Buzacott	Nationalist	1899–1933
William Carey	Labor	1925–1928
Sir Joseph Carruthers	Nationalist	1908–1932
Joseph Coates	Labor	1921–1943
James Concannon	Labor	1925–1958
Michael Connington (Note: There is some doubt about the party membership of Michael Connington and James Wilson as The Australian Worker does not include them in the 4 Labor members in the council in September 1921. If Connington had left Labor, he had re-joined by 1926 as he voted to abolish the council, despite personally opposing it.)	Labor	1917–1930
Lawrence Cotter	Independent	1925–1934
Sir Owen Cox	Nationalist	1922–1930
John Creed	Nationalist	1885–1930
Robert Cruickshank	Labor	1921–1928
John Culbert	Labor	1925–1943
George Dewar	Labor	1921–1934
William Dick	Nationalist	1907–1932
William Dickson (Note: William Dickson was appointed on 21 December 1925, and took his seat on 23 December 1925.)	Labor	1925–1934, 1940–1966
Jeffrey Dodd (Note: Jeffrey Dodd died on 16 October 1925.)	Nationalist	1917–1925
Henry Doyle	Independent	1912–1929
Thomas Doyle	Labor	1925–1934
George Earp	Nationalist	1900–1933
John Estell	Labor	1899–1901; 1922–1928
John Farleigh	Nationalist	1908–1934
Ernest Farrar	Nationalist	1912–1952
Robert Fitzgerald	Nationalist	1901–1933
Fred Flowers	Independent Labor	1900–1928
Edward Grayndler	Labor	1921–1934, 1936–1943
John Hepher	Labor	1899–1932
Simon Hickey	Labor	1925–1934
John Higgins	Labor	1921–1936
James Hoad	Labor	1925–1931
Thomas Holden (Note: Thomas Holden had been appointed by the McGowen Labor government but was not recognised as a Labor member as he had voted against government proposals, and voted against abolition of the council.)	Independent Labor	1912–1934
Percy Hordern (Note: Percy Hordern died on 1 April 1926.)	Labor	1921–1926
Henry Horne	Nationalist	1917–1955
Sir Thomas Hughes	Nationalist	1908–1930
Alfred Hunt	Progressive	1916–1930
Sydney Innes-Noad	Nationalist	1917–1931
Norman Kater	Progressive	1923–1955
Edward Kavanagh	Labor	1912–1934
John Keegan	Labor	1925–1934
William Kelly	Labor / Independent	1925–1932
John Lane Mullins	Nationalist	1917–1934
William Latimer	Nationalist	1920–1934
James Lyons	Labor / Independent	1925–1934
James Macarthur-Onslow	Nationalist	1922–1934
Kenneth Mackay	Nationalist	1899–1934
Charles Mackellar (Note: The seat of Charles Mackellar was declared vacant due to absence on 24 June 1925.)	Nationalist	1885–1903, 1903–1925
Edward Magrath (Note: Edward Magrath was appointed on 12 August 1925.)	Labor	1925–1943
Robert Mahony	Labor	1921–1961
James Malone (Note: James Malone voted for the abolition of the council.)	Independent	1925–1934
George McDonald	Independent	1921–1930
Patrick McGirr	Labor	1921–1955
Hugh McIntosh	Nationalist	1917–1932
Sir Alfred Meeks	Nationalist	1900–1932
James Minahan	Labor	1925–1934
Sir James Murdoch	Nationalist	1923–1934
Thomas Murray	Labor / Independent	1921–1958
John Nash (Note: John Nash died on 4 June 1925.)	Nationalist	1900–1925
Charles Oakes (Note: Charles Oakes was appointed on 26 May 1925 and took his seat on 24 June 1925.)	Nationalist	1925–1928
Broughton O'Conor	Nationalist	1908–1940
John O'Regan	Labor	1921–1940
John Peden	Nationalist	1917–1946
John Percival	Labor / Independent	1921–1934
Robert Pillans	Labor	1925–1934
Charles Roberts (Note: Charles Roberts died on 14 August 1925.)	Nationalist	1890–1925
William Robson	Nationalist	1920–1951
James Ryan	Nationalist	1917–1940
Mick Ryan	Labor	1925–1943
Thomas Shakespeare	Nationalist	1923–1934
Andrew Sinclair	Nationalist	1912–1934
Duncan Smith	Labor / Independent	1925–1934
Sir Joynton Smith	Independent	1912–1934
Tom Smith	Labor	1921–1934
Frank Spicer	Labor	1925–1973
Robert Sproule	Labor	1920–1934
Thomas Storey	Labor	1921–1934
John Suttor	Labor	1921–1934
Sir Allen Taylor	Nationalist	1912–1940
John Travers (Note: John Travers was a Labor member in January 1913, however he resigned from the party some time prior to 1921.)	Independent	1908–1934
Arthur Trethowan	Progressive	1916–1937
Thomas Tyrrell (Note: Thomas Tyrrell was appointed on 26 August 1925.)	Labor	1925–1942
George Varley	Nationalist	1917–1934
Thomas Waddell	Nationalist	1917–1934
Frank Wall	Nationalist	1917–1941
Winter Warden	Nationalist	1917–1934
John Wetherspoon	Nationalist	1908–1928
James White (Note: James White died on 18 January 1927.)	Nationalist	1908–1927
Albert Willis	Labor	1925–1933
James Wilson (Note: James Wilson died on 24 September 1925.)	Labor	1899–1925
John Wise	Nationalist	1917–1934
Edwin Wrench	Labor	1925–1934
Arthur Yager	Labor	1925–1934

== See also ==
- First Lang Ministry
- Second Lang Ministry
