= Members of the New South Wales Legislative Council, 1927–1930 =

Members of the New South Wales Legislative Council who served from 1927 to 1930 were appointed for life by the Governor on the advice of the Premier. This list includes members between the 1927 state election on 8 October 1927 and the 1930 state election on 25 October 1930. The President was Fred Flowers until 14 December 1928 and then Sir John Peden.

Name	Party	Years in office
William Ainsworth	Labor	1925–1934
Carl Akhurst	Independent	1925–1934
Alexander Alam	Labor	1925–1958, 1963–1973
George Archer	Labor	1925–1949
James Ashton	Nationalist	1907–1934
George Black	Nationalist	1917–1934
Reginald Black (Note: Reginald Black died on 30 June 1928.)	Nationalist	1900–1928
Francis Boyce	Nationalist	1923–1932
Sir Henry Braddon	Nationalist	1917–1940
William Brennan	Labor	1925–1934
Charles Bridges	Labor	1925–1937, 1940–1943
William Brooks	Nationalist	1917–1934
Joseph Browne	Independent	1912–1932
Frank Bryant	Nationalist	1912–1934
Nicholas Buzacott	Nationalist	1899–1933
William Carey (Note: William Carey died on 22 January 1928.)	Labor	1925–1928
Sir Joseph Carruthers	Nationalist	1908–1932
Joseph Coates	Labor	1921–1943
Stanley Cole (Note: Stanley Cole was appointed on 15 November 1927.)	Nationalist	1927–1934
James Concannon	Labor	1925–1958
Michael Connington	Labor	1917–1930
Lawrence Cotter	Independent	1925–1934
Sir Owen Cox (Note: Sir Owen Cox resigned on 17 June 1930.)	Nationalist	1922–1930
John Creed	Nationalist	1885–1930
Robert Cruickshank (Note: Robert Cruickshank died 6 November 1928.)	Labor	1921–1928
John Culbert	Labor	1925–1943
George Dewar	Labor	1921–1934
William Dick	Nationalist	1907–1932
William Dickson	Labor	1925–1934, 1940–1966
Henry Doyle (Note: Henry Doyle died on 29 January 1929.)	Independent	1912–1929
Thomas Doyle	Labor	1925–1934
George Earp	Nationalist	1900–1933
John Estell (Note: John Estell died on 18 October 1928.)	Labor	1922–1928
John Farleigh	Nationalist	1908–1934
Ernest Farrar	Nationalist	1912–1952
Robert Fitzgerald	Nationalist	1901–1933
Fred Flowers (Note: Fred Flowers died on 14 December 1928.)	Independent Labor	1900–1928
Edward Grayndler	Labor	1921–1934, 1936–1943
Alfred Hemsley (Note: 4 members were appointed on 8 November 1927.)	Nationalist	1927–1934
John Hepher	Labor	1899–1932
Simon Hickey	Labor	1925–1934
John Higgins	Labor	1921–1936
James Hoad	Labor	1925–1931
Thomas Holden	Labor	1912–1934
Henry Horne	Nationalist	1917–1955
Sir Thomas Hughes (Note: Sir Thomas Hughes died on 15 April 1930.)	Nationalist	1908–1930
Alfred Hunt (Note: Alfred Hunt died on 16 August 1930.)	Country	1916–1930
Sydney Innes-Noad	Nationalist	1917–1931
Sir Norman Kater	Country	1923–1955
Edward Kavanagh	Labor	1912–1934
John Keegan	Labor	1925–1934
William Kelly	Independent	1925–1932
William Kirkness	Nationalist	1927–1934
John Lane Mullins	Nationalist	1917–1934
William Latimer	Nationalist	1920–1934
James Lyons	Independent	1925–1934
James Macarthur-Onslow	Nationalist	1922–1934
Kenneth Mackay	Nationalist	1899–1934
Edward Magrath	Labor	1925–1943
Robert Mahony	Labor	1921–1961
James Malone	Independent	1925–1934
George McDonald (Note: George McDonald resigned on 30 September 1930.)	Independent	1921–1930
Patrick McGirr	Labor	1921–1955
Hugh McIntosh	Nationalist	1917–1932
Sir Alfred Meeks	Nationalist	1900–1932
James Minahan	Labor	1925–1934
Sir James Murdoch	Nationalist	1923–1934
Thomas Murray	Independent	1921–1958
George Nesbitt	Country	1927–1940
Charles Oakes (Note: Charles Oakes died on 3 July 1928.)	Nationalist	1925–1928
Broughton O'Conor	Nationalist	1908–1940
John O'Regan	Labor	1921–1940
Sir John Peden	Nationalist	1917–1946
John Percival	Independent	1921–1934
Robert Pillans	Labor	1925–1934
Thomas Playfair	Nationalist	1927–1966
William Robson	Nationalist	1920–1951
James Ryan	Nationalist	1917–1940
Mick Ryan	Labor	1925–1943
Thomas Shakespeare	Nationalist	1923–1934
Andrew Sinclair	Nationalist	1912–1934
Duncan Smith	Labor	1925–1934
Sir Joynton Smith	Independent	1912–1934
Tom Smith	Labor	1921–1934
Frank Spicer	Labor	1925–1973
Robert Sproule	Labor	1920–1934
Thomas Storey	Labor	1921–1934
John Suttor	Labor	1921–1934
Sir Allen Taylor	Nationalist	1912–1940
John Travers	Labor	1908–1934
Arthur Trethowan	Country	1916–1937
Thomas Tyrrell	Labor	1925–1942
George Varley	Nationalist	1917–1934
Thomas Waddell	Nationalist	1917–1934
Frank Wall	Nationalist	1917–1941
Winter Warden	Nationalist	1917–1934
John Wetherspoon (Note: John Wetherspoon died on 12 June 1928.)	Nationalist	1908–1928
Albert Willis	Labor	1925–1933
John Wise	Nationalist	1917–1934
Edwin Wrench	Labor	1925–1934
Arthur Yager	Labor	1925–1934

== See also ==
- Bavin ministry
