= Members of the New South Wales Legislative Council, 1930–1932 =

Members of the New South Wales Legislative Council who served from 1930 to 1932 were appointed for life by the Governor on the advice of the Premier. This list includes members between the 1930 state election on 25 October 1930 and the 1932 state election on 11 June 1932. The President was Sir John Peden. The Premier Jack Lang had been seeking to swamp the council, however the Governor Sir Philip Game had declined to do so in November 1930, March, June and September 1931 when Lang sought 70 new members be appointed. In November 1931 Lang dropped his request to 25 new members and the governor agreed to the request. This raised the number of members of the council from 85 to 110.

In 1930 Labor put forward two bills, one to repeal section 7A of the NSW Constitution (which prevented the abolition of the Council without a referendum), the other to abolish the Council. Believing that a referendum was necessary before the bills could become law, the Legislative Council permitted the bills to pass without a division on 10 December. Lang then announced his intention of presenting the bills for Game's Royal assent without a referendum. The following day, two members of the Legislative Council, Thomas Playfair and Arthur Trethowan, applied for and were granted an injunction by the Supreme Court preventing the President of the Council and the ministers from presenting the bills to the Governor without having held a referendum. Peden, despite being named as the first defendant, did not defend the case as he was convinced of section 7A's validity under the Colonial Laws Validity Act 1865. The injunction was upheld by the Full Court of the Supreme Court on 23 December. Lang's appeal to the High Court of Australia was rejected by a majority of the court in Attorney-General (New South Wales) v Trethowan on 16 March 1931. Lang then appealed this decision to the Judicial Committee of the Privy Council in London, which delayed hearing the appeal until April 1932. The appeal was finally resolved with the judgment of the Judicial Committee of the Privy Council on 31 May 1932 which dismissed the appeal. The bills repealing Section 7A and abolishing the Legislative Council could not therefore be presented to the Governor for assent as they had been passed in a referendum.

Name	Party	Years in office
William Ainsworth	Labor / Labor (NSW)	1925–1934
Carl Akhurst	Independent	1925–1934
Alexander Alam	Labor / Labor (NSW)	1925–1958, 1963–1973
George Archer	Labor / Labor (NSW)	1925–1949
James Ashton	Nationalist / United Australia (Note: The United Australia Party was founded in April–May 1931)	1907–1934
George Black	Nationalist / United Australia	1917–1934
Francis Boyce	Nationalist / United Australia	1923–1932
Sir Henry Braddon	Nationalist / United Australia	1917–1940
William Brennan	Labor / Labor (NSW)	1925–1934
Charles Bridges	Labor / Labor (NSW)	1925–1937, 1940–1943
William Brooks	Nationalist / United Australia	1917–1934
Joseph Browne	Independent	1912–1932
Frank Bryant	Nationalist / United Australia	1912–1934
George Buckley (Note: Took their seat on 24 November 1931 as a result of Lang flooding the council.)	Labor / Labor (NSW)	1931–1934
Nicholas Buzacott	Nationalist / United Australia	1899–1933
Sir Joseph Carruthers	Nationalist / United Australia	1908–1932
Joseph Coates	Labor / Federal Labor (Note: The NSW branch of Labor was expelled from the party in March 1931, with 12 members joining Federal Labor.)	1921–1943
Stanley Cole	Nationalist / United Australia	1927–1934
James Concannon	Labor / Labor (NSW)	1925–1958
Michael Connington (Note: Michael Connington died on 3 December 1930.)	Labor / Labor (NSW)	1917–1930
Lawrence Cotter	Independent	1925–1934
John Cowburn	Labor / Labor (NSW)	1931–1934
John Creed (Note: John Creed died on 30 October 1930.)	Nationalist / United Australia	1885–1930
John Culbert	Labor / Labor (NSW)	1925–1943
John Davoren (Note: John Davoren took his seat on 1 December 1931.)	Labor / Labor (NSW)	1931–1934
George Dewar	Labor / Labor (NSW)	1921–1934
William Dick	Nationalist / United Australia	1907–1932
William Dickson	Labor / Labor (NSW)	1925–1934, 1940–1966
Thomas Doyle	Labor / Labor (NSW)	1925–1934
George Earp	Nationalist / United Australia	1900–1933
Thomas Falkingham	Labor / Labor (NSW)	1931–1934
John Farleigh	Nationalist / United Australia	1908–1934
Ernest Farrar	Nationalist / United Australia	1912–1952
Robert Fitzgerald	Nationalist / United Australia	1901–1933
James Fox	Labor / Labor (NSW)	1931–1934
William Gibb	Labor / Labor (NSW)	1931–1934, 1943–1952
Donald Grant (Note: Donald Grant took his seat on 25 November 1931.)	Labor / Labor (NSW)	1931–1940
James Graves	Labor / Labor (NSW)	1931–1961
Edward Grayndler	Labor / Federal Labor	1921–1934, 1936–1943
Catherine Green	Labor / Labor (NSW)	1931–1932
Alfred Hemsley	Nationalist / United Australia	1927–1934
John Hepher	Labor / Labor (NSW)	1899–1932
Simon Hickey	Labor / Labor (NSW)	1925–1934
John Higgins	Labor / Federal Labor	1921–1936
James Hoad (Note: James Hoad died on 12 June 1931.)	Labor / Labor (NSW)	1925–1931
Thomas Holden	Labor / Federal Labor	1912–1934
Henry Horne	Nationalist / United Australia	1917–1955
Sydney Innes-Noad (Note: Sydney Innes-Noad died on 11 February 1931.)	Nationalist	1917–1931
Sir Norman Kater	Country	1923–1955
Edward Kavanagh	Labor / Labor (NSW)	1912–1934
John Keegan	Labor / Federal Labor	1925–1934
William Kelly	Independent	1925–1932
John Kilburn	Labor / Labor (NSW)	1931–1934
Robert King	Labor / Labor (NSW)	1931–1960
William Kirkness	Nationalist / United Australia	1927–1934
John Lane Mullins	Nationalist / United Australia	1917–1934
William Latimer	Nationalist / United Australia	1920–1934
James Lyons	Independent	1925–1934
James Macarthur-Onslow	Nationalist / United Australia	1922–1934
Kenneth Mackay	Nationalist / United Australia	1899–1934
Edward Magrath	Labor / Labor (NSW)	1925–1943
Robert Mahony	Labor / Labor (NSW)	1921–1961
James Malone	Independent	1925–1934
John Martin	Labor / Labor (NSW)	1931–1946
Joseph Martin	Labor / Labor (NSW)	1931–1934
Patrick McGirr	Labor / Labor (NSW)	1921–1955
Hugh McIntosh (Note: Hugh McIntosh vacated his seat due to bankruptcy on 11 May 1932.)	Nationalist / United Australia	1917–1932
Alan McNamara	Labor / Labor (NSW)	1931–1934, 1937–1955
Sir Alfred Meeks (Note: Sir Alfred Meeks died on 6 March 1932.)	Nationalist / United Australia	1900–1932
James Minahan	Labor / Federal Labor	1925–1934
George Mullins	Labor / Labor (NSW)	1931–1948
Sir James Murdoch	Nationalist / United Australia	1923–1934
Thomas Murray	Independent	1921–1958
George Nesbitt	Country	1927–1940
Broughton O'Conor	Nationalist / United Australia	1908–1940
John O'Regan	Labor / Federal Labor	1921–1940
John Francis O'Reilly	Labor / Labor (NSW)	1931–1934
John Joseph O'Reilly	Labor / Labor (NSW)	1931–1933
Sir John Peden	Nationalist / United Australia	1917–1946
John Percival	Independent/United Australia	1921–1934
Robert Pillans	Labor / Labor (NSW)	1925–1934
Thomas Playfair	Nationalist / United Australia	1927–1966
Frank Pollard	Labor / Labor (NSW)	1931–1934
Daniel Rees	Labor / Labor (NSW)	1931–1934
William Robson	Nationalist / United Australia	1920–1951
Frederick Roels	Labor / Labor (NSW)	1931–1934
James Ryan	Nationalist / United Australia	1917–1940
Mick Ryan	Labor / Federal Labor	1925–1943
Robert Savage	Labor / Labor (NSW)	1931–1934, 1943–1959
Thomas Shakespeare	Nationalist / United Australia	1923–1934
Andrew Sinclair	Nationalist / United Australia	1912–1934
Gilbert Sinclair	Labor / Labor (NSW)	1931–1934
Duncan Smith	Labor / Federal Labor	1925–1934
Sir Joynton Smith	Independent	1912–1934
Samuel Smith	Labor / Labor (NSW)	1931–1940
Tom Smith	Labor / Labor (NSW)	1921–1934
Frank Spicer	Labor / Federal Labor	1925–1973
Robert Sproule	Labor / Labor (NSW)	1920–1934
Thomas Storey	Labor / Federal Labor	1921–1934
John Suttor	Labor / Labor (NSW)	1921–1934
Colin Tannock	Labor / Labor (NSW)	1931–1952
Sir Allen Taylor	Nationalist / United Australia	1912–1940
John Travers	Labor / Labor (NSW)	1908–1934
Arthur Trethowan	Country	1916–1937
Thomas Tyrrell	Labor / Labor (NSW)	1925–1942
George Varley	Nationalist / United Australia	1917–1934
Thomas Waddell	Nationalist / United Australia	1917–1934
Frank Wall	Nationalist / United Australia	1917–1941
Winter Warden	Nationalist / United Australia	1917–1934
Ellen Webster (Note: Ellen Webster took her seat on 26 November 1931.)	Labor / Labor (NSW)	1931–1934
Albert Willis	Labor / Federal Labor	1925–1933
John Wise	Nationalist / United Australia	1917–1934
Edwin Wrench	Labor / Labor (NSW)	1925–1934
Arthur Yager	Labor / Labor (NSW)	1925–1934

== See also ==
- Third Lang Ministry
