= Members of the New South Wales Legislative Council, 1922–1925 =

Members of the New South Wales Legislative Council who served from 1922 to 1925 were appointed for life by the Governor on the advice of the Premier. This list includes members between the election on 25 March 1922 and the election on 30 May 1925. The President was Fred Flowers.

Name	Party	Years in office
James Ashton	Nationalist	1907–1934
George Black	Nationalist	1917–1934
Reginald Black	Nationalist	1900–1928
Frank Boyce (Note: Francis Boyce, Christopher McRae, Sir James Murdoch and Thomas Shakespeare were appointed on 7 August 1923.)	Nationalist	1923–1932
Sir Henry Braddon	Nationalist	1917–1940
William Brooks	Nationalist	1917–1934
Alexander Brown (Note: James McGowen died on 7 April 1922.)	Nationalist	1892–1926
Joseph Browne	Independent	1912–1932
Frank Bryant	Labor	1912–1934
Sir James Burns (Note: Sir James Burns died on 22 August 1923.)	Nationalist	1908–1923
Nicholas Buzacott	Nationalist	1899–1933
Sir Joseph Carruthers	Nationalist	1908–1932
Joseph Coates	Labor	1921–1943
Cecil Coghlan (Note: Cecil Coghlan died on 26 August 1924.)	Labor	1921–1924
Michael Connington (Note: There is some doubt about the party membership of Michael Connington and James Wilson as The Australian Worker does not include them in the 4 Labor members in the council in September 1921.)	Labor	1917–1930
Sir Owen Cox	Nationalist	1922–1930
John Creed	Nationalist	1885–1930
Robert Cruickshank	Labor	1921–1928
George Dewar	Labor	1921–1934
William Dick	Nationalist	1907–1932
Jeffrey Dodd (Note: Jack Power resigned on 20 November 1924.)	Nationalist	1917–1925
Henry Doyle	Independent	1912–1929
George Earp	Nationalist	1900–1933
John Estell (Note: John Estell was appointed on 14 February 1922 and took his seat on 26 April 1922.)	Labor	1899–1901; 1922–1928
John Farleigh	Nationalist	1908–1934
Ernest Farrar	Nationalist	1912–1952
Jack FitzGerald (Note: Jack FitzGerald died on 4 July 1922.)	Nationalist	1915–1922
Robert Fitzgerald	Nationalist	1901–1933
Fred Flowers	Independent Labor	1900–1928
James Gannon (Note: James Gannon died on 30 September 1924.)	Nationalist	1904–1924
James Gormly (Note: James Gormly died on 19 May 1922.)	Nationalist	1904–1922
Edward Grayndler	Labor	1921–1934, 1936–1943
John Hepher	Labor	1899–1932
John Higgins	Labor	1921–1936
Thomas Holden (Note: Thomas Holden had been appointed by the McGowen Labor government but was not recognised as a Labor member as he had voted against government proposals.)	Independent Labor	1912–1934
Percy Hordern	Labor	1921–1926
Henry Horne	Nationalist	1917–1955
Sir Thomas Hughes	Nationalist	1908–1930
Alfred Hunt	Progressive	1916–1930
William Hurley (Note: William Hurley died on 28 March 1924.)	Nationalist	1904–1924
Sydney Innes-Noad	Nationalist	1917–1931
Henry Kater (Note: Norman Kater, appointed on 22 August 1923 was the son of Henry Kater.) (Note: Henry Kater died on 23 September 1924.)	Independent	1889–1924
Norman Kater	Progressive	1923–1955
Edward Kavanagh	Labor	1912–1934
John Lane Mullins	Nationalist	1917–1934
William Latimer	Nationalist	1920–1934
James Macarthur-Onslow (Note: James Macarthur-Onslow & James Robinson were appointed on 4 July 1922.)	Nationalist	1922–1934
Kenneth Mackay	Nationalist	1899–1934
Charles Mackellar	Nationalist	1885–1903, 1903–1925
Robert Mahony	Labor	1921–1961
George McDonald	Independent	1921–1930
Patrick McGirr	Labor	1921–1955
James McGowen	Independent Labor	1917–1922
Hugh McIntosh	Nationalist	1917–1932
Christopher McRae (Note: Christopher McRae died on 3 September 1924.)	Nationalist	1923–1924
Sir Alfred Meeks	Nationalist	1900–1932
Henry Moses (Note: Henry Moses resigned on 23 July 1923.)	Nationalist	1885–1923
Sir James Murdoch	Nationalist	1923–1934
Thomas Murray	Labor	1921–1958
John Nash	Nationalist	1900–1925
Broughton O'Conor	Nationalist	1908–1940
John O'Regan	Labor	1921–1940
John Peden	Nationalist	1917–1946
John Percival	Labor	1921–1934
John Perry (Note: John Perry resigned on 10 May 1922.)	Nationalist	1920–1922
Jack Power	Labor	1921–1924
Charles Roberts	Nationalist	1890–1925
James Robinson (Note: James Robinson died on 16 September 1922.)	Nationalist	1922
William Robson	Nationalist	1920–1951
James Ryan	Nationalist	1917–1940
Thomas Shakespeare	Nationalist	1923–1934
Andrew Sinclair	Nationalist	1912–1934
Fergus Smith (Note: Fergus Smith died on 25 January 1924.)	Nationalist	1895–1924
Sir Joynton Smith	Independent	1912–1934
Tom Smith	Labor	1921–1934
Robert Sproule	Labor	1920–1934
Sir David Storey (Note: Sir David Storey died on 27 July 1924.)	Nationalist	1920–1924
Thomas Storey	Labor	1921–1934
John Suttor	Labor	1921–1934
Sir Allen Taylor	Nationalist	1912–1940
Patrick Taylor (Note: Patrick Taylor died on 17 November 1922.)	Nationalist	1917–1922
John Travers (Note: John Travers was a Labor member in January 1913, however he resigned from the party some time prior to 1921.)	Independent	1908–1934
Arthur Trethowan	Progressive	1916–1937
George Varley	Nationalist	1917–1934
Thomas Waddell	Nationalist	1917–1934
Frank Wall	Nationalist	1917–1941
Winter Warden	Nationalist	1917–1934
John Wetherspoon	Nationalist	1908–1928
James White	Nationalist	1908–1927
James Wilson	Labor	1899–1925
John Wise	Nationalist	1917–1934

== See also ==
- Second Fuller Ministry
