= Members of the New South Wales Legislative Council, 1920–1922 =

Members of the New South Wales Legislative Council who served from 1920 to 1922 were appointed for life by the Governor on the advice of the Premier. This list includes members between the election on 20 March 1920 and the election on 25 March 1922. The President was Fred Flowers.

Name	Party	Years in office
James Ashton	Nationalist	1907–1934
Joseph Beeston (Note: Joseph Beeston died on 8 March 1921.)	Nationalist	1908–1921
George Black	Nationalist	1917–1934
Reginald Black	Nationalist	1900–1928
Sir Henry Braddon	Nationalist	1917–1940
William Brooks	Nationalist	1917–1934
Alexander Brown	Nationalist	1892–1926
Joseph Browne	Independent	1912–1932
Frank Bryant (Note: Frank Bryant was readmitted to Labor in August 1921, said to be 1 of 4 Labor members in the council.)	Independent / Labor	1912–1934
Sir James Burns	Nationalist	1908–1923
Nicholas Buzacott	Nationalist	1899–1933
Sir Joseph Carruthers	Nationalist	1908–1932
Joseph Coates (Note: 13 members were appointed on 30 August 1921.)	Labor	1921–1943
Cecil Coghlan	Labor	1921–1924
Michael Connington (Note: There is some doubt about the party membership of Michael Connington and James Wilson as The Australian Worker does not include them in the 4 Labor members in the council in September 1921.)	Labor	1917–1930
John Creed	Nationalist	1885–1930
Robert Cruickshank	Labor	1921–1928
George Dewar (Note: George Dewar was appointed on 30 August 1921 and took his seat on 14 September 1921.)	Labor	1921–1934
William Dick	Nationalist	1907–1932
Jeffrey Dodd	Nationalist	1917–1925
Henry Doyle	Independent	1912–1929
George Earp	Nationalist	1900–1933
John Farleigh	Nationalist	1908–1934
Ernest Farrar	Nationalist	1912–1952
Jack FitzGerald	Nationalist	1915–1922
Robert Fitzgerald	Nationalist	1901–1933
Fred Flowers	Independent Labor	1900–1928
James Gannon	Nationalist	1904–1924
John Garland (Note: John Garland on 23 February 1921.)	Nationalist	1908–1921
James Gormly	Nationalist	1904–1922
Edward Grayndler	Labor	1921–1934, 1936–1943
John Hall (Note: John Hall died on 27 July 1921.)	Nationalist	1917–1921
John Hepher	Labor	1899–1932
John Higgins	Labor	1921–1936
Thomas Holden	Independent Labor	1912–1934
Percy Hordern	Labor	1921–1926
Henry Horne	Nationalist	1917–1955
Sir Thomas Hughes	Nationalist	1908–1930
Alfred Hunt	Progressive	1916–1930
William Hurley	Nationalist	1904–1924
Sydney Innes-Noad	Nationalist	1917–1931
Henry Kater	Independent	1889–1924
Edward Kavanagh	Labor	1912–1934
John Lane Mullins	Nationalist	1917–1934
William Latimer (Note: William Latimer, John Perry, William Robson Jr and Sir David Storey were appointed on 4 February 1920 and took their seats on 27 April 1920. (Note: William Robson Jr was the son of William Robson Sr.))	Nationalist	1920–1934
Kenneth Mackay	Nationalist	1899–1934
Charles Mackellar	Nationalist	1885–1903, 1903–1925
Robert Mahony	Labor	1921–1961
George McDonald (Note: George McDonald was appointed on 16 February 1920 and took his seat on 10 August 1920.)	Independent	1921–1930
Patrick McGirr	Labor	1921–1955
James McGowen	Independent Labor	1917–1922
Hugh McIntosh	Nationalist	1917–1932
John Meagher (Note: John Meagher died on 26 August 1920.)	Independent	1900–1920
Sir Alfred Meeks	Nationalist	1900–1932
Henry Moses	Nationalist	1885–1923
Thomas Murray	Labor	1921–1958
John Nash	Nationalist	1900–1925
John Nobbs (Note: John Hall died on 11 November 1921.)	Nationalist	1917–1921
Broughton O'Conor	Nationalist	1908–1940
John O'Regan (Note: John O'Regan was appointed on 30 August 1921 and took his seat on 31 August 1921.)	Labor	1921–1940
John Peden	Nationalist	1917–1946
John Percival (Note: John Percival was appointed on 30 August 1921 and took his seat on 1 September 1921.)	Labor	1921–1934
John Perry	Nationalist	1920–1922
Jack Power	Labor	1921–1924
Charles Roberts	Nationalist	1890–1925
William Robson Sr (Note: William Robson Sr died on 25 October 1920.)	Nationalist	1900–1920
William Robson Jr	Nationalist	1920–1951
James Ryan	Nationalist	1917–1940
Andrew Sinclair	Nationalist	1912–1934
Fergus Smith	Nationalist	1895–1924
Sir Joynton Smith	Independent	1912–1934
Tom Smith	Labor	1921–1934
Robert Sproule (Note: Robert Sproule was appointed on 12 April 1920 and took his seat on 27 April 1920.)	Labor	1920–1934
Sir David Storey	Nationalist	1920–1924
Thomas Storey	Labor	1921–1934
John Suttor	Labor	1921–1934
Sir Allen Taylor	Nationalist	1912–1940
Patrick Taylor	Nationalist	1917–1922
John Travers (Note: John Travers was a Labor member in January 1913, however he resigned from the party some time prior to 1921.)	Independent	1908–1934
Arthur Trethowan	Progressive	1916–1937
George Varley	Nationalist	1917–1934
Thomas Waddell	Nationalist	1917–1934
Frank Wall	Nationalist	1917–1941
Winter Warden	Nationalist	1917–1934
John Wetherspoon	Nationalist	1908–1928
James White	Nationalist	1908–1927
James Wilson	Labor	1899–1925
John Wise	Nationalist	1917–1934

== See also ==
- Storey ministry
- First Dooley ministry
- First Fuller ministry
- Second Dooley ministry
