= Members of the New South Wales Legislative Council, 1917–1920 =

Members of the New South Wales Legislative Council who served from 1917 to 1920 were appointed for life by the Governor on the advice of the Premier. This list includes members between the election on 24 March 1917 and the election on 20 March 1920. The President was Fred Flowers.

Name	Party	Years in office
James Ashton	Nationalist	1907–1934
Joseph Beeston	Nationalist	1908–1921
George Black (Note: 20 members were appointed on 11 May 1917 and took their seats on 17 July 1917.)	Nationalist	1917–1934
Reginald Black	Nationalist	1900–1928
Henry Braddon	Nationalist	1917–1940
William Brooks	Nationalist	1917–1934
Alexander Brown	Nationalist	1892–1926
Joseph Browne	Independent	1912–1932
Frank Bryant	Independent	1912–1934
Sir James Burns	Nationalist	1908–1923
Nicholas Buzacott	Nationalist	1899–1933
Sir Joseph Carruthers	Nationalist	1908–1932
Michael Connington (Note: Michael Connington was appointed on 11 May 1917 and took his seat on 25 July 1917.)	Labor	1917–1930
John Creed	Nationalist	1885–1930
Henry Dangar (Note: Henry Dangar died on 25 April 1917.)	Nationalist	1883–1917
William Dick	Nationalist	1907–1932
Jeffrey Dodd	Nationalist	1917–1925
Henry Doyle	Independent	1912–1929
George Earp	Nationalist	1900–1933
John Farleigh	Nationalist	1908–1934
Ernest Farrar	Nationalist	1912–1952
Jack FitzGerald	Nationalist	1915–1922
Robert Fitzgerald	Nationalist	1901–1933
Fred Flowers	Independent Labor	1900–1928
Edmund Fosbery (Note: Edmund Fosbery died on 1 July 1919.)	Nationalist	1904–1919
James Gannon	Nationalist	1904–1924
John Garland	Nationalist	1908–1921
James Gormly	Nationalist	1904–1922
John Hall	Nationalist	1917–1921
John Hepher	Labor	1899–1932
Louis Heydon (Note: Louis Heydon died on 17 May 1918.)	Nationalist	1889–1918
William Hill (Note: William Hill died on 11 January 1919.)	Nationalist	1900–1919
William Holborow (Note: William Holborow died on 10 July 1917.)	Nationalist	1899–1917
Thomas Holden (Note: Thomas Holden had been appointed by the McGowen Labor government but was not recognised as a Labor man as they had voted against government proposals.)	Labor	1912–1934
Henry Horne	Nationalist	1917–1955
Sir Thomas Hughes	Nationalist	1908–1930
Alfred Hunt	Nationalist	1916–1930
William Hurley	Nationalist	1904–1924
Sydney Innes-Noad	Nationalist	1917–1931
Henry Kater	Independent	1889–1924
Edward Kavanagh	Labor	1912–1934
John Lane Mullins	Nationalist	1917–1934
Kenneth Mackay	Nationalist	1899–1934
Charles Mackellar	Nationalist	1885–1903, 1903–1925
Sir Samuel McCaughey (Note: Sir Samuel McCaughey died on 25 July 1919.)	Independent	1899–1919
James McGowen	Independent Labor	1917–1922
Hugh McIntosh	Nationalist	1917–1932
John Meagher	Independent	1900–1920
Dick Meagher (Note: Dick Meagher resigned on 23 February 1920.)	Independent	1917–1920
Alfred Meeks	Nationalist	1900–1932
Henry Moses	Nationalist	1885–1923
John Nash	Nationalist	1900–1925
John Nobbs	Nationalist	1917–1921
Broughton O'Conor	Nationalist	1908–1940
John Peden	Nationalist	1917–1946
Charles Roberts	Nationalist	1890–1925
William Robson	Nationalist	1900–1920
James Ryan	Nationalist	1917–1940
Andrew Sinclair	Nationalist	1912–1934
Fergus Smith	Nationalist	1895–1924
Joynton Smith	Independent	1912–1934
Sir Allen Taylor	Nationalist	1912–1940
Patrick Taylor	Nationalist	1917–1922
John Travers (Note: John Travers was a Labor member in January 1913, however he resigned from the party some time prior to 1921.)	Independent	1908–1934
Arthur Trethowan	Nationalist	1916–1937
George Varley	Nationalist	1917–1934
Thomas Waddell	Nationalist	1917–1934
Frank Wall	Nationalist	1917–1941
Winter Warden	Nationalist	1917–1934
John Wetherspoon	Nationalist	1908–1928
James White	Nationalist	1908–1927
James Wilson	Labor	1899–1925
Frederick Winchcombe (Note: Frederick Winchcombe died on 29 June 1917.)	Nationalist	1907–1917
John Wise	Nationalist	1917–1934

== See also ==
- Holman Nationalist ministry
