= Members of the New South Wales Legislative Council, 1910–1913 =

Members of the New South Wales Legislative Council who served from 1910 to 1913 were appointed for life by the Governor on the advice of the Premier. This list includes members between the election on 14 October 1910 and the election on 6 December 1913. The President was Sir Francis Suttor.

Name	Party	Years in office
James Ashton	Liberal Reform	1907–1934
Joseph Beeston	Liberal Reform	1908–1921
Reginald Black	Liberal Reform	1900–1928
Alexander Brown	Liberal Reform	1892–1926
Joseph Browne (Note: 9 members were appointed on 29 March 1912, however James McInerney died on 8 July 1912 before taking his seat. The remaining 8 took their seats on 23 July 1912.)	Independent	1912–1932
Frank Bryant	Labor	1912–1934
James Burns	Liberal Reform	1908–1923
Nicholas Buzacott	Labor	1899–1933
Sir Joseph Carruthers	Liberal Reform	1908–1932
John Creed	Liberal Reform	1885–1930
Henry Dangar	Liberal Reform	1883–1917
William Dick	Liberal Reform	1907–1932
Henry Doyle	Independent	1912–1929
George Earp	Liberal Reform	1900–1933
John Farleigh	Liberal Reform	1908–1934
Ernest Farrar	Labor	1912–1952
Robert Fitzgerald	Liberal Reform	1901–1933
Fred Flowers	Labor	1900–1928
Edmund Fosbery	Liberal Reform	1904–1919
James Gannon	Liberal Reform	1904–1924
John Garland	Liberal Reform	1908–1921
James Gormly	Liberal Reform	1904–1922
George Greene (Note: George Greene died on 22 December 1911.)	Liberal Reform	1899–1911
Henry Gullett	Liberal Reform	1908–1914
David Hall (Note: David Hall was appointed on 2 April 1912, and took his seat on 23 July 1912.) (Note: David Hall resigned on 14 November 1913.)	Labor	1912–1913
John Hepher	Labor	1899–1932
Louis Heydon	Liberal Reform	1889–1918
William Hill	Liberal Reform	1900–1919
William Holborow	Liberal Reform	1899–1917
Thomas Holden (Note: Thomas Holden and Andrew Sinclair had been appointed by the McGowen Labor government but were not recognised as Labor men as they had voted against government proposals.)	Independent Labor	1912–1934
John Hughes (Note: John Hughes died on 18 December 1912.)	Liberal Reform	1895–1912
Thomas Hughes	Liberal Reform	1908–1930
William Hurley	Liberal Reform	1904–1924
Henry Kater	Independent	1889–1924
Edward Kavanagh	Labor	1912–1934
Alexander Kethel	Liberal Reform	1895–1916
George Lee (Note: George Lee died on 23 January 1912.)	Liberal Reform	1882–1912
John Macintosh (Note: John Macintosh died on 6 July 1911.)	Independent	1882–1911
Kenneth Mackay	Liberal Reform	1899–1934
Charles Mackellar	Liberal Reform	1885–1903, 1903–1925
Sir Normand MacLaurin	Independent	1889–1914
Sir Samuel McCaughey	Independent	1899–1919
James McInerney	Labor	1912
John Meagher	Independent	1900–1920
Alfred Meeks	Liberal Reform	1900–1932
Henry Moses	Liberal Reform	1885–1923
John Nash	Liberal Reform	1900–1925
Broughton O'Conor	Liberal Reform	1908–1940
Charles Pilcher	Liberal Reform	1891–1916
Charles Roberts	Liberal Reform	1890–1925
William Robson	Liberal Reform	1900–1920
Alexander Ross (Note: Alexander Ross died on 27 September 1912.)	Liberal Reform	1900–1912
Andrew Sinclair	Independent Labor	1912–1934
Fergus Smith	Liberal Reform	1895–1924
Joynton Smith	Independent	1912–1934
Henry Stuart (Note: Henry Stuart died on 26 December 1910.)	Labor	1900–1910
Sir Francis Suttor	Independent	1889–1891, 1900–1915
Sir Allen Taylor (Note: Sir Allen Taylor was appointed on 25 April 1912, and took his seat on 23 July 1912.)	Liberal Reform	1912–1940
John Travers (Note: John Travers was a Labor member when appointed by the Wade Liberal government, however he did not sign the Labor pledge until 1911. He was still a Labor member in January 1913, however he resigned from the party some time prior to 1921.)	Labor	1908–1934
William Trickett	Liberal Reform	1888–1916
John Wetherspoon	Liberal Reform	1908–1928
James White	Liberal Reform	1908–1927
James Wilson	Labor	1899–1925
Frederick Winchcombe	Liberal Reform	1907–1917

== See also ==
- McGowen ministry
- Holman Labor ministry
