= Members of the New South Wales Legislative Council, 1913–1917 =

Members of the New South Wales Legislative Council who served from 1913 to 1917 were appointed for life by the Governor on the advice of the Premier. This list includes members between the election on 6 December 1913 and the election on 24 March 1917. The President was Sir Francis Suttor until his death in April 1915 and then Fred Flowers.

At the Easter 1916 NSW Labor Conference, the Holman government was censured "for refusing to endeavour to carry out and give effect to the first plank of the Labour platform - abolitlon of the Upper House". The Labor split in November 1916 over conscription completely recast the party composition of the Legislative Assembly. Premier Holman, and twenty of his supporters were expelled from the party for defying party policy and supporting conscription. They joined a grand coalition with the members of the various conservative parties. By 1917, this had coalesced into the Nationalist Party of Australia. No members of the Legislative Council were expelled at the time, however 4 members joined the Nationalist party and 2 sat as independents.

| Name | Party | Years in office |
|---|---|---|
| James Ashton | Liberal Reform / Nationalist | 1907–1934 |
| George Beeby (Note: George Beeby was appointed on 16 November 1916.) (Note: George Beeby resigned on 26 February 1917.) | Nationalist | 1916–1917 |
| Joseph Beeston | Liberal Reform / Nationalist | 1908–1921 |
| Reginald Black | Liberal Reform / Nationalist | 1900–1928 |
| Alexander Brown | Liberal Reform / Nationalist | 1892–1926 |
| Joseph Browne | Independent | 1912–1932 |
| Frank Bryant | Labor / Independent | 1912–1934 |
| James Burns | Liberal Reform / Nationalist | 1908–1923 |
| Nicholas Buzacott (Note: Joined the Nationalist party at some point after the Labor split.) | Labor / Nationalist | 1899–1933 |
| Sir Joseph Carruthers | Liberal Reform / Nationalist | 1908–1932 |
| John Creed | Liberal Reform / Nationalist | 1885–1930 |
| Henry Dangar | Liberal Reform / Nationalist | 1883–1917 |
| William Dick | Liberal Reform / Nationalist | 1907–1932 |
| Henry Doyle | Independent | 1912–1929 |
| George Earp | Liberal Reform / Nationalist | 1900–1933 |
| John Farleigh | Liberal Reform / Nationalist | 1908–1934 |
| Ernest Farrar | Labor / Nationalist | 1912–1952 |
| Jack FitzGerald (Note: Jack FitzGerald was appointed on 15 July 1915.) | Labor / Nationalist | 1915–1922 |
| Robert Fitzgerald | Liberal Reform / Nationalist | 1901–1933 |
| Fred Flowers | Labor / Independent Labor | 1900–1928 |
| Edmund Fosbery | Liberal Reform / Nationalist | 1904–1919 |
| James Gannon | Liberal Reform / Nationalist | 1904–1924 |
| John Garland | Liberal Reform / Nationalist | 1908–1921 |
| James Gormly | Liberal Reform / Nationalist | 1904–1922 |
| Henry Gullett (Note: Henry Gullett died on 4 August 1914.) | Liberal Reform | 1908–1914 |
| John Hepher | Labor | 1899–1932 |
| Louis Heydon | Liberal Reform / Nationalist | 1889–1918 |
| William Hill | Liberal Reform / Nationalist | 1900–1919 |
| William Holborow | Liberal Reform / Nationalist | 1899–1917 |
| Thomas Holden (Note: Thomas Holden and Andrew Sinclair had been appointed by the McGowen Labor government but were not recognised as Labor men as they had voted against government proposals.) | Independent Labor | 1912–1934 |
| Sir Thomas Hughes | Liberal Reform / Nationalist | 1908–1930 |
| Alfred Hunt (Note: Alfred Hunt and Arthur Trethowan were appointed on 7 December 1916.) | Nationalist | 1916–1930 |
| William Hurley | Liberal Reform / Nationalist | 1904–1924 |
| Henry Kater | Independent | 1889–1924 |
| Edward Kavanagh | Labor | 1912–1934 |
| Alexander Kethel (Note: Alexander Kethel died on 23 June 1916.) | Liberal Reform | 1895–1916 |
| Kenneth Mackay | Liberal Reform / Nationalist | 1899–1934 |
| Charles Mackellar | Liberal Reform / Nationalist | 1885–1903, 1903–1925 |
| Sir Normand MacLaurin (Note: Sir Normand MacLaurin died on 24 August 1914.) | Independent | 1889–1914 |
| Sir Samuel McCaughey | Independent | 1899–1919 |
| John Meagher | Independent | 1900–1920 |
| Alfred Meeks | Liberal Reform / Nationalist | 1900–1932 |
| Henry Moses | Liberal Reform / Nationalist | 1885–1923 |
| John Nash | Liberal Reform / Nationalist | 1900–1925 |
| Broughton O'Conor | Liberal Reform / Nationalist | 1908–1940 |
| Charles Pilcher (Note: Charles Pilcher died on 22 December 1916.) | Liberal Reform | 1891–1916 |
| Charles Roberts | Liberal Reform / Nationalist | 1890–1925 |
| William Robson | Liberal Reform / Nationalist | 1900–1920 |
| Andrew Sinclair | Independent Labor / Nationalist | 1912–1934 |
| Fergus Smith | Liberal Reform / Nationalist | 1895–1924 |
| Joynton Smith | Independent | 1912–1934 |
| Sir Francis Suttor (Note: Sir Francis Suttor died on 4 April 1915.) | Independent | 1889–1891, 1900–1915 |
| Sir Allen Taylor | Liberal Reform / Nationalist | 1912–1940 |
| John Travers (Note: John Travers was a Labor member in January 1913, however he resigned from the party some time prior to 1921.) | Independent | 1908–1934 |
| Arthur Trethowan | Nationalist | 1916–1937 |
| William Trickett (Note: William Trickett died on 4 July 1916.) | Liberal Reform | 1888–1916 |
| John Wetherspoon | Liberal Reform / Nationalist | 1908–1928 |
| James White | Liberal Reform / Nationalist | 1908–1927 |
| James Wilson | Labor | 1899–1925 |
| Frederick Winchcombe | Liberal Reform / Nationalist | 1907–1917 |

== See also ==
- Holman Labor ministry
- Holman Nationalist ministry
