= Members of the New South Wales Legislative Council, 1907–1910 =

Members of the New South Wales Legislative Council who served from 1907 to 1910 were appointed for life by the Governor on the advice of the Premier. This list includes members between the election on 10 September 1907 and the election on 14 October 1910. The President was Sir Francis Suttor.

Name	Party	Years in office
James Ashton (Note: 3 members were appointed on 2 October 1907.)	Liberal Reform	1907–1934
Joseph Beeston (Note: 12 members were appointed on 21 July 1908.)	Liberal Reform	1908–1921
Reginald Black	Liberal Reform	1900–1928
Alexander Brown	Liberal Reform	1892–1926
James Brunker (Note: James Brunker died on 26 June 1909.)	Liberal Reform	1905–1909
James Burns	Liberal Reform	1908–1923
Nicholas Buzacott	Labor	1899–1933
Sir Joseph Carruthers (Note: Sir Joseph Carruthers was appointed on 28 October 1908.)	Liberal Reform	1908–1932
Samuel Charles (Note: Samuel Charles died on 23 September 1909.)	Liberal Reform	1885–1909
John Creed	Liberal Reform	1885–1930
William Cullen (Note: William Cullen resigned on 25 January 1910.)	Liberal Reform	1895–1910
Henry Dangar	Liberal Reform	1883–1917
William Dick	Liberal Reform	1907–1932
George Earp	Liberal Reform	1900–1933
John Farleigh	Liberal Reform	1908–1934
Robert Fitzgerald	Liberal Reform	1901–1933
Fred Flowers	Labor	1900–1928
Edmund Fosbery	Liberal Reform	1904–1919
James Gannon	Liberal Reform	1904–1924
John Garland	Liberal Reform	1908–1921
James Gormly	Liberal Reform	1904–1922
George Greene	Liberal Reform	1899–1911
Henry Gullett	Liberal Reform	1908–1914
John Gunn (Note: John Gunn died on 21 September 1910.)	Liberal Reform	1908–1910
Nicholas Hawken (Note: Nicholas Hawken died on 13 July 1908.)	Liberal Reform	1899–1908
James Hayes (Note: James Hayes died on 24 May 1908.)	Liberal Reform	1904–1908
John Hepher	Labor	1899–1932
Louis Heydon	Liberal Reform	1889–1918
William Hill	Liberal Reform	1900–1919
William Holborow	Liberal Reform	1899–1917
John Hughes	Liberal Reform	1895–1912
Thomas Hughes	Liberal Reform	1908–1930
Frederick Humphery (Note: Frederick Humphery died on 10 April 1908.)	Liberal Reform	1888–1908
William Hurley	Liberal Reform	1904–1924
Richard Jones (Note: Richard Jones died on 30 April 1909.)	Liberal Reform	1899–1909
Henry Kater	Independent	1889–1924
Andrew Kerr (Note: Andrew Kerr died on 15 November 1907.)	Liberal Reform	1888–1907
Alexander Kethel	Liberal Reform	1895–1916
George Lee	Liberal Reform	1882–1912
William Long (Note: William Long resigned on 17 March 1909.)	Liberal Reform	1885–1909
John Macintosh	Independent	1882–1911
Kenneth Mackay	Liberal Reform	1899–1934
Charles Mackellar	Liberal Reform	1885–1903, 1903–1925
Sir Normand MacLaurin	Independent	1889–1914
Sir Samuel McCaughey	Independent	1899–1919
John Meagher	Independent	1900–1920
Alfred Meeks	Liberal Reform	1900–1932
Henry Moses	Liberal Reform	1885–1923
John Nash	Liberal Reform	1900–1925
Broughton O'Conor	Liberal Reform	1908–1940
Sir Arthur Renwick (Note: Sir Arthur Renwick died on 23 November 1908.)	Liberal Reform	1888–1908
Robert Patten (Note: Robert Patten resigned on 28 February 1910.)	Liberal Reform	1908–1910
Charles Pilcher (Note: The seat of Bernhard Wise was declared vacant due to absence on 10 March 1908.)	Liberal Reform	1891–1916
Charles Roberts	Liberal Reform	1890–1925
William Robson	Liberal Reform	1900–1920
Alexander Ross	Liberal Reform	1900–1912
Alexander Ryrie (Note: Alexander Ryrie died on 29 May 1909.)	Independent	1892–1909
Fergus Smith	Liberal Reform	1895–1924
Henry Stuart	Labor	1900–1910
Sir Francis Suttor	Independent	1889–1891, 1900–1915
John Travers	Labor	1908–1934
William Trickett	Liberal Reform	1888–1916
William Walker (Note: William Walker died on 12 June 1908.)	Liberal Reform	1888–1908
James Watson (Note: James Watson died on 30 October 1907.)	Liberal Reform	1887–1907
John Wetherspoon	Liberal Reform	1908–1928
James White	Liberal Reform	1908–1927
James Wilson	Labor	1899–1925
Frederick Winchcombe	Liberal Reform	1907–1917
Bernhard Wise	Liberal Reform	1900–1908

== See also ==
- Wade ministry
