= Members of the New South Wales Legislative Council, 1904–1907 =

Members of the New South Wales Legislative Council who served from 1904 to 1907 were appointed for life by the Governor on the advice of the Premier. This list includes members between the state election on 6 August 1904 and the state election on 10 September 1907. The President was Sir Francis Suttor.

Non-Labor party affiliations at this time were fluid, and especially in the Legislative Council regarded more as loose labels than genuine parties.

Name	Party	Years in office
Reginald Black	Liberal Reform	1900–1928
Alexander Brown	Progressive	1892–1926
James Brunker (Note: James Brunker was appointed on 12 June 1905.)	Liberal Reform	1905–1909
Nicholas Buzacott	Labour	1899–1933
William Campbell (Note: William Campbell died on 3 July 1906.)	Progressive	1890–1906
Samuel Charles	Progressive	1885–1909
John Creed	Liberal Reform	1885–1930
William Cullen	Liberal Reform	1895–1910
Henry Dangar	Liberal Reform	1883–1917
George Day (Note: George Day died on 13 July 1906.)	Independent	1889–1906
George Earp	Progressive	1900–1933
Robert Fitzgerald	Liberal Reform	1901–1933
Fred Flowers	Labour	1900–1928
Edmund Fosbery (Note: 5 members were appointed on 21 June 1904, taking their seats on 23 August 1904.)	Progressive	1904–1919
Robert Fowler (Note: Robert Fowler died on 12 June 1906.)	Liberal Reform	1895–1906
James Gannon	Progressive	1904–1924
James Gormly	Progressive	1904–1922
George Greene	Liberal Reform	1899–1911
Nicholas Hawken	Liberal Reform	1899–1908
James Hayes	Progressive	1904–1908
John Hepher	Labour	1899–1932
Louis Heydon	Liberal Reform	1889–1918
William Hill	Progressive	1900–1919
William Holborow	Liberal Reform	1899–1917
John Hughes	Liberal Reform	1895–1912
Frederick Humphery	Liberal Reform	1888–1908
William Hurley	Progressive	1904–1924
Richard Jones	Liberal Reform	1899–1909
Henry Kater	Independent	1889–1924
Andrew Kerr	Liberal Reform	1888–1907
Alexander Kethel	Liberal Reform	1895–1916
George Lee	Liberal Reform	1882–1912
William Long	Progressive	1885–1909
John Macintosh	Independent	1882–1911
Kenneth Mackay	Progressive	1899–1934
Charles Mackellar	Progressive	1885–1903, 1903–1925
Sir Normand MacLaurin	Independent	1889–1914
Sir Samuel McCaughey	Independent	1899–1919
John Meagher	Progressive	1900–1920
Alfred Meeks	Progressive	1900–1932
Henry Moses	Liberal Reform	1885–1923
John Nash	Progressive	1900–1925
James Norton (Note: James Norton died on 18 July 1906.)	Liberal Reform	1879–1906
William Pigott (Note: William Pigott resigned on 14 June 1907.)	Liberal Reform	1887–1907
Charles Pilcher	Liberal Reform	1891–1916
Sir Arthur Renwick	Liberal Reform	1888–1908
Charles Roberts	Liberal Reform	1890–1925
William Robson	Progressive	1900–1920
Alexander Ross	Progressive	1900–1912
Alexander Ryrie	Independent	1892–1909
Sir John See (Note: Sir John See was appointed on 21 June 1904, taking his seat on 24 August 1904.) (Note: Sir John See died on 31 January 1907.)	Progressive	1904–1907
Thomas Slattery (Note: Thomas Slattery was convicted of a felony and his seat was declared vacant on 13 June 1905.)	Progressive	1900–1905
Fergus Smith	Liberal Reform	1895–1924
Henry Stuart	Labour	1900–1910
Sir Francis Suttor	Progressive	1889–1891, 1900–1915
William Trickett	Liberal Reform	1888–1916
Ebenezer Vickery (Note: Ebenezer Vickery died on 20 August 1906.)	Liberal Reform	1887–1906
William Walker	Liberal Reform	1888–1908
Jack Want (Note: Jack Want died on 22 November 1905.)	Independent	1894–1905
James Watson	Liberal Reform	1887–1907
James Wilson	Labour	1899–1925
Bernhard Wise	Liberal Reform	1900–1908

== See also ==
- Carruthers ministry
