= Members of the New South Wales Legislative Council, 1898–1901 =

Members of the New South Wales Legislative Council who served from 1898 to 1901 were appointed for life by the Governor on the advice of the Premier. This list includes members between the election on 27 July 1898 and the election on 3 July 1901. The President was Sir John Lackey.

Non-Labor party affiliations at this time were fluid, and especially in the Legislative Council regarded more as loose labels than genuine parties.

Name	Party	Years in office
Benjamin Backhouse	Independent	1895–1904
Reginald Black (Note: 12 members were appointed on 6 June 1900 and took their seats on 12 June 1900.)	Free Trade	1900–1928
James Blanksby (Note: James Blanksby resigned on 11 January 1901 to accept an appointment as Secretary to the Miners' Accident Relief Board.)	Free Trade	1895–1901
Richard Bowker	Independent	1888–1903
Alexander Brown	Protectionist	1892–1926
Nicholas Buzacott (Note: Nicholas Buzacott was appointed on 8 April 1899, and took his seat on 18 April 1899.)	Labour	1899–1933
William Campbell	Protectionist	1890–1906
Samuel Charles	Protectionist	1885–1909
Francis Clarke (Note: 10 members were appointed on 8 April 1899, and took their seats on 11 April 1899.) (Note: Francis Clarke resigned on 28 March 1900 to return to the Legislative Assembly at the Hastings and Macleay by-election.)	Protectionist	1899–1900
George Cox	Free Trade	1863–1901
John Creed	Free Trade	1885–1930
William Cullen	Free Trade	1895–1910
Thomas Dalton (Note: Thomas Dalton died on 26 January 1901.)	Protectionist	1892–1901
Henry Dangar	Free Trade	1883–1917
George Day	Independent	1889–1906
George Earp	Protectionist	1900–1933
John Estell (Note: John Estell resigned on 19 January 1901 to successfully contest the election for Wallsend.)	Labour	1899–1901, 1922–1928
Fred Flowers	Labour	1900–1928
Robert Fowler	Free Trade	1895–1906
Andrew Garran (Note: Andrew Garran died on 6 June 1901.)	Free Trade	1887–1892, 1895–1901
Albert Gould (Note: Albert Gould resigned on 12 June 1901 as he had been elected a Senator for New South Wales.)	Free Trade	1899–1901
George Greene	Free Trade	1899–1911
Edward Greville	Protectionist	1892–1903
Nicholas Hawken	Free Trade	1899–1908
John Hepher	Labour	1899–1932
Charles Heydon (Note: Charles Heydon resigned on 15 February 1900 to accept appointment as a Judge of the District Court.)	Protectionist	1893–1898, 1898–1900
Louis Heydon	Free Trade	1889–1918
William Hill	Protectionist	1900–1919
William Holborow	Free Trade	1899–1917
James Hoskins (Note: James Hoskins died on 1 April 1900.)	Independent	1889–1900
John Hughes	Free Trade	1895–1912
Frederick Humphery	Free Trade	1888–1908
Solomon Hyam	Protectionist	1892–1901
Archibald Jacob (Note: Archibald Jacob died on 28 May 1900.)	Independent	1883–1900
Richard Jones	Free Trade	1899–1909
Henry Kater	Independent	1889–1924
Andrew Kerr	Free Trade	1888–1907
Alexander Kethel	Free Trade	1895–1916
Philip King	Free Trade	1880–1904
Sir John Lackey	Protectionist	1885–1903
Hugh Langwell	Labour	1900–1902
George Lee	Free Trade	1882–1912
William Long	Protectionist	1885–1909
John Lucas	Protectionist	1880–1902
John Macintosh	Independent	1882–1911
Kenneth Mackay (Note: Kenneth Mackay was appointed on 18 October 1899.)	Protectionist	1899–1934
Charles Mackellar	Protectionist	1885–1903, 1903–1925
Normand MacLaurin	Independent	1889–1914
Sir Samuel McCaughey	Independent	1899–1919
John Meagher	Protectionist	1900–1920
Alfred Meeks	Protectionist	1900–1932
Henry Mort (Note: Henry Mort died on 6 June 1900.)	Independent	1882–1900
Henry Moses	Free Trade	1885–1923
John Nash	Protectionist	1900–1925
James Norton	Free Trade	1879–1906
William Pigott	Free Trade	1887–1907
Charles Pilcher	Free Trade	1891–1916
Edward Pulsford (Note: Edward Pulsford resigned on 13 May 1901 as he had been elected a Senator for New South Wales.)	Free Trade	1895–1901
Sir Arthur Renwick	Free Trade	1888–1908
Charles Roberts	Free Trade	1890–1925
Richard Roberts	Free Trade	1882–1903
William Robson	Protectionist	1900–1920
Alexander Ross	Protectionist	1900–1912
Alexander Ryrie	Independent	1892–1909
Sir Julian Salomons (Note: Sir Julian Salomons resigned on 20 February 1899 to accept appointment as Agent-General for New South Wales at London.)	Independent	1870–1871, 1887–1899
Patrick Shepherd	Free Trade	1888–1903
Thomas Slattery	Protectionist	1900–1905
Fergus Smith	Free Trade	1895–1924
Thomas Smith	Protectionist	1892–1902
Septimus Stephen (Note: Septimus Stephen resigned on 3 October 1900.)	Independent	1887–1900
Henry Stuart	Labour	1900–1910
Francis Suttor (Note: Francis Suttor was appointed on 12 June 1900 and took his seat on the same day.)	Protectionist	1889–1891, 1900–1915
William Suttor (Note: William Suttor died on 10 October 1900.)	Independent	1880–1900
George Thornton	Free Trade	1877–1901
John Toohey	Protectionist	1892–1903
William Trickett	Free Trade	1888–1916
Ebenezer Vickery	Free Trade	1887–1906
William Walker	Free Trade	1888–1908
Jack Want	Free Trade	1894–1905
James Watson	Free Trade	1887–1907
Edmund Webb (Note: Edmund Webb died on 23 June 1899.)	Independent	1882–1899
Robert White (Note: Robert White died on 28 October 1900.)	Independent	1888–1900
James Wilson	Labour	1899–1925
Bernhard Wise (Note: Bernhard Wise was appointed on 30 October 1900.)	Protectionist	1900–1908

== See also ==
- Reid ministry
- Lyne ministry
