= William Ainsworth =

William Ainsworth may refer to:

- William Harrison Ainsworth (1805–1882), English historical novelist
- William Francis Ainsworth (1807–1896), English surgeon, traveller, geographer and geologist
- William Ainsworth (politician) (1875–1945), Australian politician
- Will Ainsworth (born 1981), lieutenant governor of Alabama
