= Frank Pollard (politician) =

Australian politician

Frank Pollard (28 May 1870 – 13 October 1951) was an English-born Australian politician.

He was born at Paignton in Devon to yeoman Richard Watson Pollard and Emma Kellock Haswell. He migrated to Australia around 1888 and worked as a butcher. On 27 April 1892 he married Caroline Colbran, with whom he had two children. He was active in the Australasian Meat Industry Employees' Union, serving as New South Wales state secretary from 1918 to 1941 and as federal president from 1931 to 1936. He was a founding member of the Labor Party, and was a member of the New South Wales Legislative Council from 1931 to 1934. Pollard died in Hurstville in 1951.
