= James Robinson (Australian politician) =

Australian politician

James Robinson (1860 – 16 September 1922) was an Irish-born Australian politician.

He was born at Aughantane near Clogher in County Tyrone to farmer John Robinson and Jane Moore. On 15 June 1886, he married Elizabeth Colquhoun Robinson, with whom he had a daughter. That same year, he migrated to Australia, and by 1888 ran his own business in Kogarah. In 1896, he sold out the business and later worked for Griffiths Brothers as a manager from 1921. Active in politics, he was involved with the Nationalist Party, serving on its council from 1917 to 1922 and as president of the Kogarah and Croydon branches. On 4 July 1922, he was appointed to the New South Wales Legislative Council, but died less than three months later on 16 September 1922, at Croydon.
