= Gilbert Sinclair =

Australian politician (1877–1955)

Gilbert Jamieson Sinclair (23 September 1877 – 1 February 1955) was an English-born Australian politician.

He was born in London to compositor Andrew Sinclair and Elizabeth Cameron. Having migrated to Australia he became a boilermaker. Around 1897 he married Eleanor Mavor, with whom he had five children; a second marriage around 1912 to Ada Christian Beaver produced a further daughter. He was the first federal secretary of the Boilermakers' Union in 1909. From 1931 to 1934 he was a Labor member of the New South Wales Legislative Council. He was expelled from the Labor Party as part of the split that led to the Industrial Labor Party, but was readmitted in 1939. Sinclair died in Lidcombe in 1955.
