= Christopher McRae (Australian politician) =

Australian politician

Christopher John McRae (27 June 1863 – 3 September 1924) was an Australian politician.

He was born in Stroud to storekeeper Christopher McRae and Maria Farley. He was educated locally and worked in his father's store before moving to Lismore in 1866. He formed a partnership with his employer and opened a store at Coraki, later running his own business. On 22 January 1890 he married Florence Eliza Mobbs, with whom he had eleven children. He was the inaugural president of the Primary Producers' Union from 1916 to 1924, and in 1919 moved to Sydney to represent the union full-time. In 1923 he was appointed to the New South Wales Legislative Council, but he died in Yass the following year.
