= Carl Akhurst =

Australian politician (1886–1953)

Carl Adrian Akhurst JP

Member of the New South Wales Legislative Council
- In office 21 December 1925 – 22 April 1934
- Nominated by: Jack Lang
- Appointed by: Sir Dudley de Chair

Personal details
- Born: 14 June 1886 Darlinghurst, Colony of New South Wales
- Died: 8 September 1953 (aged 67) Rockdale, New South Wales, Australia
- Resting place: Woronora Memorial Park
- Party: Australian Labor Party (NSW Branch) (1905–1926); Federal Labor Party (1931–1936); Australian Labor Party (NSW Branch) (1936–1953)
- Other political affiliations: Independent (1926–1931)
- Spouse(s): Laura Ellen Thomas (b.1878–m.1910–d.1919); Marion Lucardou-Wells (b.1890–m.1920–d.1942); Ethel May Benson (b.1895–m.1943–d.1962)
- Relations: William Mower Akhurst (grandfather)
- Children: Olwyn Ellen Akhurst (1912–2006); Thomas Adrian Akhurst (1916–1995)

Carl Adrian Akhurst JP (14 June 1886 – 8 September 1953) was an Australian accountant, secretary and politician who served as a Member of the Legislative Council of New South Wales from 1925 to 1934. Initially appointed by the Governor of New South Wales as one of 25 Labor Party appointees, Akhurst was expelled from the party after failing to vote for the council's abolition in 1926. Readmitted to the Federal Labor Party in 1931, Akhurst unsuccessfully sought re-election as the ALP candidate to the council in 1940.

== Early life and background ==
Akhurst was born on 14 June 1886 at Darlinghurst, New South Wales, to printer and accountant Thomas Carlyle Akhurst and Emily Kate Naphthali. His paternal grandfather was prominent actor, playwright and journalist, William Mower Akhurst (1822–1878). Akhurst spent his early years at Annandale, with the family residence at 51 Annandale Street, and received education at Annandale Public School, Blennerhassett's Institute of Accountancy and the Ballarat School of Mines. Akhurst first gained employment as a clerk on the staff of the newspaper The Australian Worker, published by the Australian Workers' Union. In 1905 he joined the Labor Party, was secretary of the Darlinghurst ALP branch, and was private secretary to Donald Macdonell and Edward Grayndler in their capacity as general secretaries of the Australian Workers' Union. After moving from Darlinghurst to a residence at 5 Bray Street, North Sydney and later Naremburn, Akhurst became secretary of the St Leonards and Willoughby ALP Branches.

In the period 1921–1922, he was private secretary to the Minister for Public Instruction in the Dooley Labor Government, Thomas Mutch. Akhurst then joined wine and spirit merchants Westphal and Clarke, was a tally clerk on the Sydney wharves, became share registrar of the Primary Producers Bank of Australia, and was appointed a Fellow of the Institute of Incorporated Secretaries (FIIS). In September 1924, Akhurst received appointment as a Justice of the Peace (JP).

== Member of the Legislative Council ==
When the conservative Nationalist/Progressive coalition government of Sir George Fuller, was defeated at the May 1925 NSW state election by the Labor Party under Jack Lang, the new Labor Government only held a single seat majority in the Legislative Assembly and only a handful of members in the upper Legislative Council. With the Legislative Council comprising members appointed by the Governor for life terms, it had long been seen by Lang and the Labor Party as an outdated bastion of conservative privilege holding back their reform agenda. Although Lang denied that his intention was full abolition, in September 1925 Lang requested Governor Sir Dudley de Chair to appoint 25 new members to the council, including Akhurst. De Chair, concerned that Lang's government intended to abolish the upper house, initially agreed to fifteen, but by December 1925 agreed to the full list of 25 nominees, on condition that the appointments should not be used to abolish the council.

On 21 December 1925 Akhurst took up his life appointment to the Legislative Council as a Labor member. By January 1926, Lang had reneged on his promise to the Governor, and his government's representative, Albert Willis, presented a bill in the Legislative Council for abolition, which took even some of the recent 25 appointees by surprise, although Akhurst voted yes at the bill's first reading. When the bill came up for a final reading on 23 February 1925, Akhurst was absent from the chamber when the division was called which, when combined with five other Labor appointees also being absent and two Labor members voting against, resulted in the abolition proposal's defeat 47 votes to 41.

Akhurst later explained that his absence was an unfortunate accident, having been called away on business at dinner, and arrived back at Parliament too late, after the doors had closed to the chamber for the division vote. Nevertheless, consequences were swift and on 5 March the ALP Executive expelled the two ALP MLCs that had voted against the bill, and requested the five MLCs (including Akhurst) who had been absent without cause to justify why they should not be expelled. At the party conference held on 10 April 1926, a motion was passed confirming the expulsion of Akhurst and the other four members who had been absent. In response to his expulsion from the Labor Party, Akhurst complained that he had not been given a proper opportunity to speak against his expulsion at the conference and declared: "To be a Laborite one must not necessarily be a Langite. Despite anything the Lang faction may do, I will stand firm in my loyalty to Labor principles. My association with the Labor movement extends over a period of 21 years, and I challenge Mr. Lang to point to one instance where I have violated my pledge or broken my word".

Having been employed with the Primary Producers Bank of Australia since the 1920s, Akhurst undertook several tours of rural New South Wales to inspect agricultural conditions, including Bourke, Moree, Gilgandra, Collie, Warren, Nevertire, Trangie and Narromine. He left the bank in February 1931, prior to the bank's collapse into liquidation.

With the expulsion of the NSW Branch of the Australian Labor Party in November 1931, Akhurst rejoined the ALP to sit in the council as one of 15 representatives of the Federal Labor Party. Akhurst continued to serve on the council for Federal Labor until its reconstitution as an indirectly elected chamber from 22 April 1934. Akhurst had sought election to the new council but failed to secure a seat amongst a crowded field of 90 candidates for 65 positions and which only five Federal Labor candidates were successful.

== Later life ==
In August 1934, Akhurst travelled to Dubbo to be campaign secretary for the local ALP federal Member of Parliament for Darling, Arthur Blakeley, to support his ultimately unsuccessful campaign in the 1934 federal election against Lang Labor.

With the reunification of the NSW and Federal branches of the ALP in 1936 and the deposition in 1939 of Lang as the NSW party leader by William McKell, Akhurst was again a member of the united Labor Party and in late 1940, when the sitting Legislative Council member for the United Australia Party, James Ryan, died in office, Akhurst was nominated by the ALP to be the party's candidate in the council by-election to fill the vacancy. Despite receiving 28 votes from the Labor bloc on the council, Akhurst did not receive any other support and the United Australia Party candidate, William Bradley, was ultimately successful at the election held on 22 October 1940.

In the early 1940s, Akhurst moved to the New England region town of Barraba to manage a scheelite and tungsten mine, being granted a mining lease by the NSW Government on 21 July 1941. While in Barraba he lived at the Victoria Hotel on Queen Street. In 1942 and 1943 he was elected as President of the Barraba Branch of the ALP, and later became vice-president of the New England Federal Electorate Council in 1945.

== Personal life ==
On 15 February 1910 at the Congregational Church, Collins Street, Melbourne, he married Laura Ellen Thomas of Ballarat. After moving to North Sydney in 1912 and later Naremburn, the marriage produced a daughter, Olwyn Ellen Akhurst (born 5 March 1912; Renfree from 1937), and a son, Thomas Adrian Akhurst (born 18 June 1916). His first wife died of pneumonic influenza at Brighton Emergency Hospital on 1 May 1919.

Akhurst soon remarried in 1920 to Marian Lucardou-Wells, which produced a daughter, Peggy Akhurst (Langemyr from 1944). His second wife died in 1942, and Akhurst remarried a third time on 13 January 1943 to Ethel May Smith. Akhurst was a member of the Commercial Travellers' Club (1925–1953) and the NSW Masonic Club, a Freemason (Leinster Marine Lodge, Sedgwick Sovereign Chapter), and a scribe and esteemed brother of the Royal Antediluvian Order of Buffaloes (Grand Australian Banner).

In retirement, Akhurst lived in Rockdale, at 317 Princes Highway, where he died at the age of 67 in September 1953, survived by his third wife and three children. His funeral was held at St John's Anglican Church, Rockdale, and was buried at Woronora Crematorium.
