= John Hall (New South Wales politician) =

Australian politician (1856–1921)

John Richard Hall (26 June 1856 – 27 June 1921) was an Australian politician.

He was born in Newcastle to merchant Richard Hall and Ann Cann. After leaving school he worked in his father's business, and later became chairman of the City of Newcastle Gas and Coke Company, among others. In 1893 he was president of the Newcastle Chamber of Commerce. In 1907 he married Rea Stuart Turner, with whom he had one son. A Nationalist, he was appointed to the New South Wales Legislative Council in 1917, serving until his death at Darlinghurst in 1921.
