= William Carey (politician) =

Australian politician

William Carey (5 February 1887 – 22 January 1928) was an Australian politician.

He was born in Redfern to labourer Patrick Carey and Margaret Fitzgerald. He was a union organiser with the Water and Sewerage Board Employees Association. On 12 May 1915 he married Margaret Ellen Joyce, with whom he had three children. From 1919 to 1927 he was general secretary of the New South Wales branch of the Labor Party, and from 1925 to 1928 he was a member of the New South Wales Legislative Council. Carey died at Petersham in 1928.
