= Arthur William Yager =

Australian politician

Arthur William Yager (20 August 1884 – 19 December 1967) was a state member of parliament in New South Wales and the first president of the St George Dragons football club.

Arthur Yager in 1930

== Political career ==
Arthur Yager was born in Redfern, New South Wales in 1884.

He was a long time member of the N.S.W. Labor Party, Secretary of the Eight Hour Movement and held various positions within the Australian labour movement at Trade's Hall, Sydney. In 1925, he was the appointed to the Legislative Council, which he left in 1934. He faced censure from the Labor Party and the Union Secretaries Association when he voted against the N.S.W. Premier Jack Lang's Income Taxation Bill in the Upper House in July 1931, with reports stating that he would be dismissed from the position of Secretary of the Eight Hour Art Union, a position that he held for 14 years. Yager did not ultimately suffer damage to his career as many other Labor politicians and union leaders also disagreed with Jack Lang's Taxation Bill.

== Sports administrative career ==
Yager is also remembered as the first President of the St George District Rugby League Football Club in 1921, a position he retained until retiring in 1938. His rugby league administrative career began in 1908 as a foundation board member with the Newtown club, and during the 1910s, Arthur Yager was President of Western Suburbs RLFC.

Yager spent seventeen years as President of the St George Dragons, as well as juggling a business and a political career and was a highly regarded member of the local community. Yager was held in very high esteem at St. George until the day he died.

Arthur Yager lived in Carlton, New South Wales for 40 years and was the first person to be awarded Life Membership of the St George Dragons in 1938.

== Death ==
Arthur Yager died on 19 December 1967 at his Carlton, New South Wales home, aged 83 and was survived by his two sons and four grandchildren.
