= Lawrence Cotter =

Australian politician

Lawrence Cotter (1872 – 24 August 1935) was an English-born Australian politician. He was born in Bristol to auctioneer Michael Cotter and Margaret Byrne. He migrated to Sydney around 1887, becoming an estate agent. From 1920 to 1923 he was national president of the Hibernian Australasian Catholic Benefit Society; he had also been an organiser of the Australasian Catholic Congress in 1901 and 1909 and received papal honours in 1921, 1928 and 1930. In 1925 he was appointed to the New South Wales Legislative Council; he was a Labor nominee but was not a party member and did not reliably vote with the party. He remained a member of the council until reconstitution in 1934 and died at Coogee the following year.
