= James Lyons (New South Wales politician) =

Australian politician

James Denis Lyons (9 March 1875 – 20 November 1955) was an Australian politician.

He was born in Brisbane to labourer John Lyons and Mary Sheehan. He worked as a produce merchant and as a grazier near Lyndhurst. Around 1902 he married Sarah Anne Moloney, with whom he had three children. In 1925 he was appointed to the New South Wales Legislative Council as a Labor member, but he was expelled from the party in 1926 after failing to vote to abolish the council. He remained an MLC until 1934, and died in Brisbane in 1955.
