= Mick Ryan (politician) =

Australian politician

Lionel William "Mick" Ryan (1884 – 6 February 1970) was an Australian politician.

He was born in Bathurst to Thomas and Abigail Ryan. He was a rural worker who was active in the Australian Workers' Union. From 1925 to 1943 he was a Labor member of the New South Wales Legislative Council. He opposed Jack Lang and sat as Federal Labor in the 1930s; he also took an active organisational role in Federal Labor in opposition to Lang Labor in federal and state elections. Ryan died in Croydon in 1970.
