= Thomas Doyle (Australian politician) =

Australian politician

Thomas Patrick Doyle (17 February 1885 – 18 March 1951) was an Australian politician.

He was born in Chippendale to engine driver Thomas Doyle and his wife Catherine. He attended local Catholic schools and became an ironworker; he also served in the Boer War. Around 1902 he married Mildred Conroy, with whom he had five children. He was secretary of the United Labourers Union from 1921 to 1930 and was also active in the Ironworkers Union. From 1925 to 1934 he was a Labor member of the New South Wales Legislative Council. Doyle died in Darlinghurst in 1951.
