= Duncan Smith (Australian politician) =

Australian politician

Duncan Malcolm Smith (29 October 1890 – 15 December 1973) was an Australian politician.

He was born in Newcastle to master mariner Duncan Smith and Ada Genge. He attended the University of Sydney, receiving a Bachelor of Arts in 1912 and a Master of Arts in 1920. On 26 September 1914 he married Marcella Gertrude Smyth, with whom he had four children. He became a schoolteacher, teaching at Cleveland Street (1912–15), North Sydney High School (1915–21), Goulburn (1921–27) and Sydney Boys' High School (1927–30) before becoming headmaster of Nowra Intermediate High School from 1930 to 1936. From 1925 to 1934 he was a member of the New South Wales Legislative Council, first as a Labor member. He was expelled from the party in 1926 after failing to vote for the abolition of the Legislative Council, and in the 1930s became associated with Federal Labor. From 1936 to 1954 Smith was inspector for the Albury school district. He died at Camperdown in 1973.
