= Thomas Tyrrell (Australian politician) =

Australian politician

Thomas James Tyrrell (14 April 1880 – 31 October 1942) was an Australian politician.

Tyrell was born at Coonamble to labourer Patrick Dunn Tyrell and Isabella and was educated at Redfern. Later, he was employed by Sydney City Council, co-founding the Municipal Workers Union of which he was secretary from 1912 to 1942. Under his leadership the union grew to become the Federal Municipal and Shire Council Employees' Union of Australia. He was a Labor member of the New South Wales Legislative Council from 1925 to 1942, when he died in Earlwood.
