= James Hoad =

Australian politician

James Edward Hoad (3 June 1858 – 12 July 1931) was an Australian politician.

Born in Tumut, New South Wales to bricklayer George Hoad and Mary Ann Unstead, he worked as a stockman in the Tumut district. On 19 September 1883 he married Harriett Brouger, with whom he had five children (one son, Ken Hoad, would enter the New South Wales Legislative Assembly). He established a business in Junee in 1886 and was elected to the council in 1894, serving continuously until 1931 (mayor 1899, 1906–09, 1920–21). He lost one of his eyes in 1896. In 1893 he was a foundation member and president of the Junee Labor League, later becoming active in the Labor Party. He was an executive officer of the Riverina branch of the Australian Workers' Union for many years. In 1925 he was appointed to the New South Wales Legislative Council, serving until his death in 1931 at Randwick.
