= Edwin Wrench =

Australian politician

George Edwin Wrench (1876 – 6 November 1948) was an English-born Australian politician.

He was born in Birmingham to carpenter William Wrench and Selina Woods. He was a patternmaker and worked in Panama and the United States before settling in New South Wales around 1911. He lived at Auburn and was involved with the Amalgamated Engineering Union. On 18 October 1913 he married Christina Martin Gillies, with whom he had a daughter. From 1925 to 1934 he was a Labor member of the New South Wales Legislative Council. Wrench died in Auburn in 1948.
