= William Kelly (New South Wales politician) =

Australian politician (1875–1932)

William Patrick Kelly (29 March 1875 – 9 December 1932) was an Australian politician.

He was born at Bathurst to Patrick Kelly and Elizabeth Quinn. He attended St Stanislaus' College and was articled to a solicitor, being admitted to practice in 1900. On 26 June 1896 he married Katie Boyle, with whom he had nine children. He was an alderman at Wellington from 1902 to 1920, serving as mayor from 1911 to 1913 and again in 1920. In 1925 he was appointed to the New South Wales Legislative Council as a Labor member, but he was expelled from the party the following year after he did not vote to abolish the council. He remained an MLC until his death at Wellington in 1932.
