= James Minahan =

Australian politician

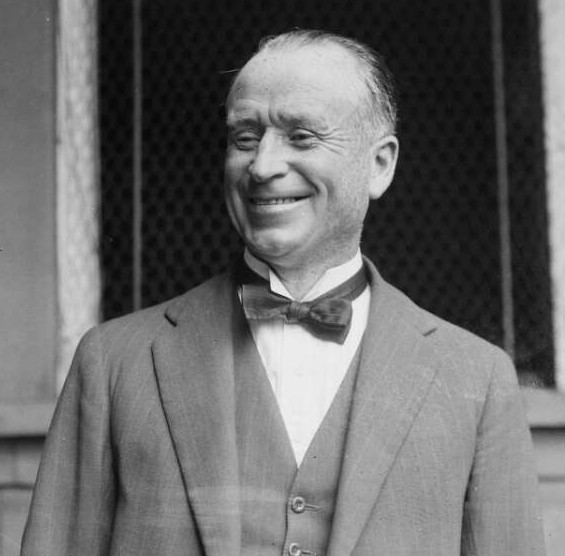

James Mark Minahan (1872 – 11 October 1941) was an Irish-born Australian politician.

Born in County Clare to bootmaker Patrick Minahan and Mary Murphy, Minahan migrated to New South Wales around 1883 and partnered with his brother Patrick as a boot manufacturer. Around 1900 he married Mary Eileen Killeen, with whom he had four children. From 1925 to 1934 he served as a Labor Party member of the New South Wales Legislative Council; he opposed Jack Lang in the 1930s and sat as a Federal Labor representative. Minahan died at Waverley in 1941.
