= Edward Magrath (politician) =

Australian politician

Edward Crawford Magrath (5 February 1881 – 7 March 1961) was an English-born Australian politician.

He was born in Whitehaven in Cumbria to seaman Carleton Magrath and Elizabeth Trohear. He came to New South Wales at a young age and was educated at Balmain before becoming a compositor and printer. He was active in the Typographical Association, serving as its president in 1914. From 1916 to 1927 he was state secretary of the Printing Industry Employees' Union, becoming federal secretary from 1933 to 1952. He also served on the state and federal central executives of the Australian Labor Party, becoming state vice-president from 1923 to 1925 and state president from 1925 to 1926. From 1925 to 1943 he was a Labor member of the New South Wales Legislative Council. He was deputy commissioner of the New South Wales Industrial Commission from 1931 to 1932. Magrath died in Kogarah in 1961.
