= Owen Cox =

Australian politician (1866–1932)

Sir Owen Cox GBE
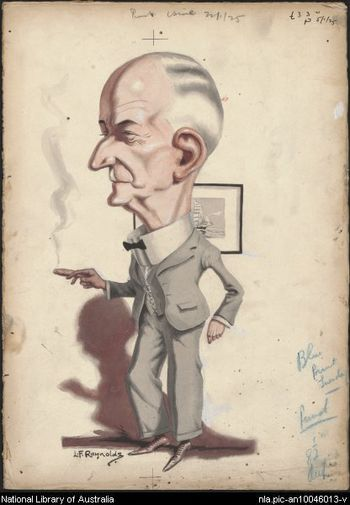

Member of the New South Wales Legislative Council
- In office 1922–1932

Personal details
- Born: Edward Owen Cox; 21 January 1866 Laugharne, Carmarthenshire, Wales
- Died: 30 July 1932 (aged 66) Monte Carlo, Monaco

Sir Edward Owen Cox (21 January 1866 – 30 July 1932) was a Welsh-born Australian businessman and politician.

Cox was born in Laugharne, was educated at Christ's Hospital, and went to sea at the age of fourteen. He left his first ship at Auckland, New Zealand, however, and went into the banking business. After a few years he returned to Britain, but then sailed to Australia and settled in Sydney. He became chairman of Birt & Co and a director of the Federal Steam Navigation Co Ltd. He was appointed to the New South Wales Legislative Council in 1922.

For his war services, Cox was appointed Knight Commander of the Order of the British Empire (KBE) in the 1918 New Year Honours and Knight Grand Cross of the Order of the British Empire (GBE) in the Dominion war honours of 1920.

Cox died in Monte Carlo, aged 66, after an illness lasting several months.
