= James Malone (Australian politician) =

Australian politician

Member of the New South Wales Legislative Council
- In office 21 December 1925 – 22 April 1934
- Monarch: George V
- Governors General: John Baird (1925-31); Isaac Isaacs (1931-34)
- Prime Minister: Stanley Bruce (1925-29); James Scullin (1929-32); Joseph Lyons (1932-34)
- Governor: Dudley de Chair (1925-30); Philip Game (1930-34)

Personal details
- Born: Daniel James Malone; 27 September 1878 Kapunda, South Australia, Australia
- Died: 20 August 1952 (aged 73) Haberfield, New South Wales, Australia
- Party: Labor
- Other political affiliations: Voted independently in the chamber
- Spouse: Catherine Mary Balfe (m. 1904)
- Occupation: Farm worker, engineer, company director, politician

Daniel James Malone (27 September 1878 – 20 August 1952) was an Australian politician.

He was born in Kapunda in South Australia to station master Daniel Malone and Elizabeth Kiely. He was educated in Adelaide and worked on a farm at Terowrie before moving to Tasmania and then Sydney. He became an engineer, working for the Australian Institute of Engineers and directing several companies. On 15 August 1904 he married Catherine Mary Balfe, with whom he had six children. From 1925 to 1934 he was a member of the New South Wales Legislative Council; he was nominated by the Labor Party but voted independently in the chamber. Malone died at Haberfield in 1952.
