= William Ainsworth (politician) =

Australian politician

William Ainsworth (16 June 1875 – 7 February 1945) was an Australian politician.

He was born at Lambton to schoolmaster John Ainsworth and Sarah McKean. He was an engine-driver before entering politics, and was active in the New South Wales Locomotive, Engine Drivers, Firemen and Cleaners Association (later the Australian Federated Union of Locomotive Enginemen), serving as state secretary from 1911 to 1935. In 1925 he was appointed to the New South Wales Legislative Council as a Labor member; he served until the reconstitution of the Council in 1934. Ainsworth died in Vaucluse in 1945.
