= Henry Stuart (Australian politician) =

Australian politician

Henry Stuart (1853 – 26 December 1910) was an English-born Australian politician.

He was born to estate agent Henry Stuart and Jane Doughty in Southsea, Hampshire. Around 1880, he married Annie Turner on the Isle of Wight, and they had two children. After spending some years in the United States, he migrated first to South Australia and later to New South Wales, where he worked as a manufacturing chemist. Based in North Sydney, he was actively involved with the Labor Party, serving as president of the St Leonards Labor League. In 1900, he was appointed to the New South Wales Legislative Council, serving until he died in North Sydney in 1910.
