= Thomas Shakespeare (politician) =

Australian politician

Thomas Mitchell Shakespeare (25 July 1873 – 16 September 1938) was an Australian politician.

He was born in Penrith to engineer Thomas Shakespeare and Margaret Brown. He was educated at Forbes and became a compositor's apprentice at the age of fourteen. In 1894, he founded the Condobolin Lachlander newspaper. In 1896, he married Anne Forster, with whom he had six children. He ran The Grafton Argus from 1902 to 1904 and from 1904 to 1928 was secretary of the N.S.W. Country Press Co-operative Company, and its president from 1928 to 1929. In 1925, he began Federal Capital Press of Australia Ltd, publisher of The Canberra Times.

He was initially a member of the Labor Party, but he left over conscription in the 1916 Labor split and became a Nationalist. From 1923 to 1934, he was a member of the New South Wales Legislative Council. From 1930 until his death, he was also a member of the Australian Capital Territory Advisory Council. Shakespeare died in Canberra in 1938.
