= Jeffrey Dodd =

Australian politician

Jeffrey Milburn Dodd (29 November 1855 – 16 October 1925) was an Australian politician.

He was born in Sandhurst in Melbourne to miner John Henry Dodd and Sophia Karney. He grew up around Grenfell and Young in rural New South Wales, and worked as a miner and building contractor. From 1884 to 1901 he was a storekeeper at Gundagai. From 1901 he was involved in the Labor Party as president of the Gundagai Labor League and of the electorate councils for Hume and Cootamundra. He was a councillor for Adjungbilly from 1906 to 1908 and Gundagai from 1924 to 1925. He left the Labor Party in the 1916 split over conscription, and in 1917 was appointed to the New South Wales Legislative Council as a Nationalist. He died in 1925 at Lewisham.
