= John Suttor =

Australian politician

John Bligh Suttor (23 September 1883 – 11 September 1960) was an Australian politician.

He was the grandson of son of colonial politician John Bligh Suttor and was born in Waverley, son of that pioneer's fourth son, John Bligh Suttor (10 December 1859 – 30 May 1925), pastoralist and businessman, who married Emma Isabel Parker-Bullough (née Hunt) on 13 December 1882.

He was Trade Commissioner for New South Wales in Japan, and died in Kobe, where his remains were buried. He was honoured with an impressive memorial: a bronze bust atop a 3 m column.

He attended Sydney High School and became an electrical engineer, also owning land near Bathurst. On 19 September 1908 he married Madeline Constance Nash, with whom he had one son.

He was appointed to the New South Wales Legislative Council in 1921 as a Labor Party nominee, although there were allegations that he was not a true member of the party at the time. He served until 1934, when the council was reconstituted. Suttor died at Wahroonga in 1960.
