= George Dewar (Australian politician) =

Australian politician

George Alexander Dewar (25 March 1868 – 2 August 1953) was an Australian politician.

== Biography ==
Dewar was born in Ballarat to Donald Dewar and Sarah Dallas. He was educated in Melbourne and became a rural worker, before mining at Chiltern. His union involvement saw him move away to become a firewood cutter, and around 1903 he settled at Mudgee. He later became a brewer, and in 1921 was appointed to the New South Wales Legislative Council as a Labor member. He served until the reconstitution of the Council in 1934, and later retired to Mount Isa. He died in Sydney in August 1953.
