= Ted Grayndler =

Australian politician

The Honourable Ted Grayndler OBE
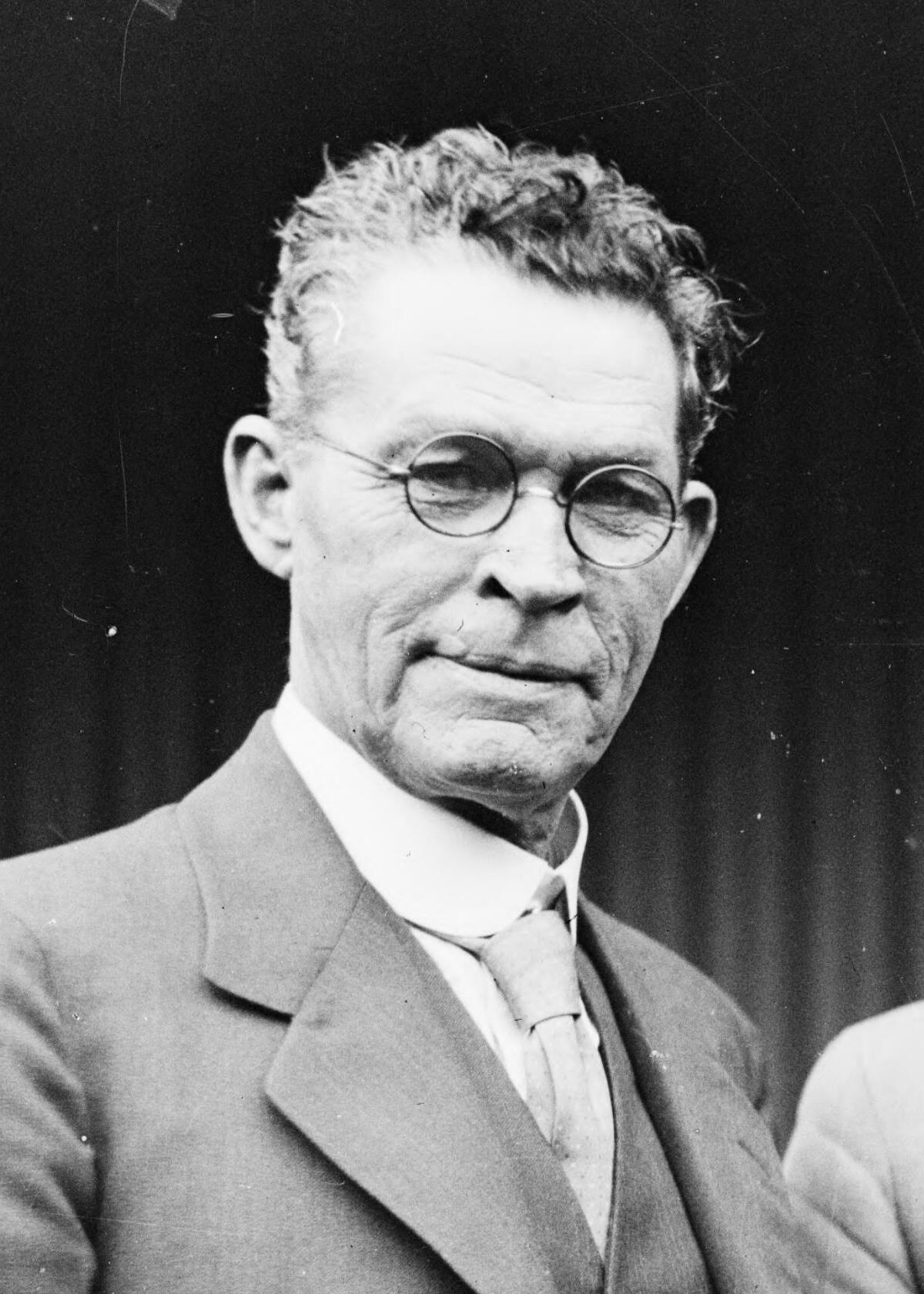

General Secretary of the Australian Workers' Union
- In office July 1912 – April 1941
- Preceded by: Tom White
- Succeeded by: Clarrie Fallon

Member of the New South Wales Legislative Council
- In office 10 November 1936 – 12 March 1943
- Preceded by: John Higgins
- Succeeded by: Chris Dalton
- In office 30 August 1921 – 22 April 1934
- Appointed by: Sir Walter Davidson

Personal details
- Born: 12 October 1867 One Tree Hill, Colony of New South Wales
- Died: 12 March 1943 (aged 75) Richmond, Victoria, Australia
- Party: Labor
- Spouse: Margaret Walsh (m. 1901)
- Occupation: Shearer

Edward Grayndler OBE (12 October 1867 – 12 March 1943) was an Australian trade unionist and politician. He served as general secretary of the Australian Workers' Union (AWU) from 1912 to 1941, the longest term in the union's history.

Grayndler was born in Mount Victoria, New South Wales. He left school at a young age and worked in the Outback, becoming an inaugural member of the Amalgamated Shearers' Union. He was a paid organiser with the AWU from 1895 and was appointed Victorian secretary in 1900. Grayndler succeeded as general secretary in 1912 and preserved the AWU's independence and influence over several decades. He was an anti-conscriptionist during World War I and during the 1920s was known for his anti-communism and support of the White Australia policy. Outside of his union positions he represented the Australian Labor Party (ALP) in the New South Wales Legislative Council for nearly 20 years.

== Early life ==
Grayndler was born on 12 October 1867 in Mount Victoria, New South Wales. He was the fourth son born to Johanna (née Maloney) and John Grayndler; his mother was born in Ireland and his father in Canada. Grayndler attended the public school in Home Rule. As a young man he worked various jobs in rural New South Wales and Queensland, including fencing, droving, shearing and mining.

== Union activities ==
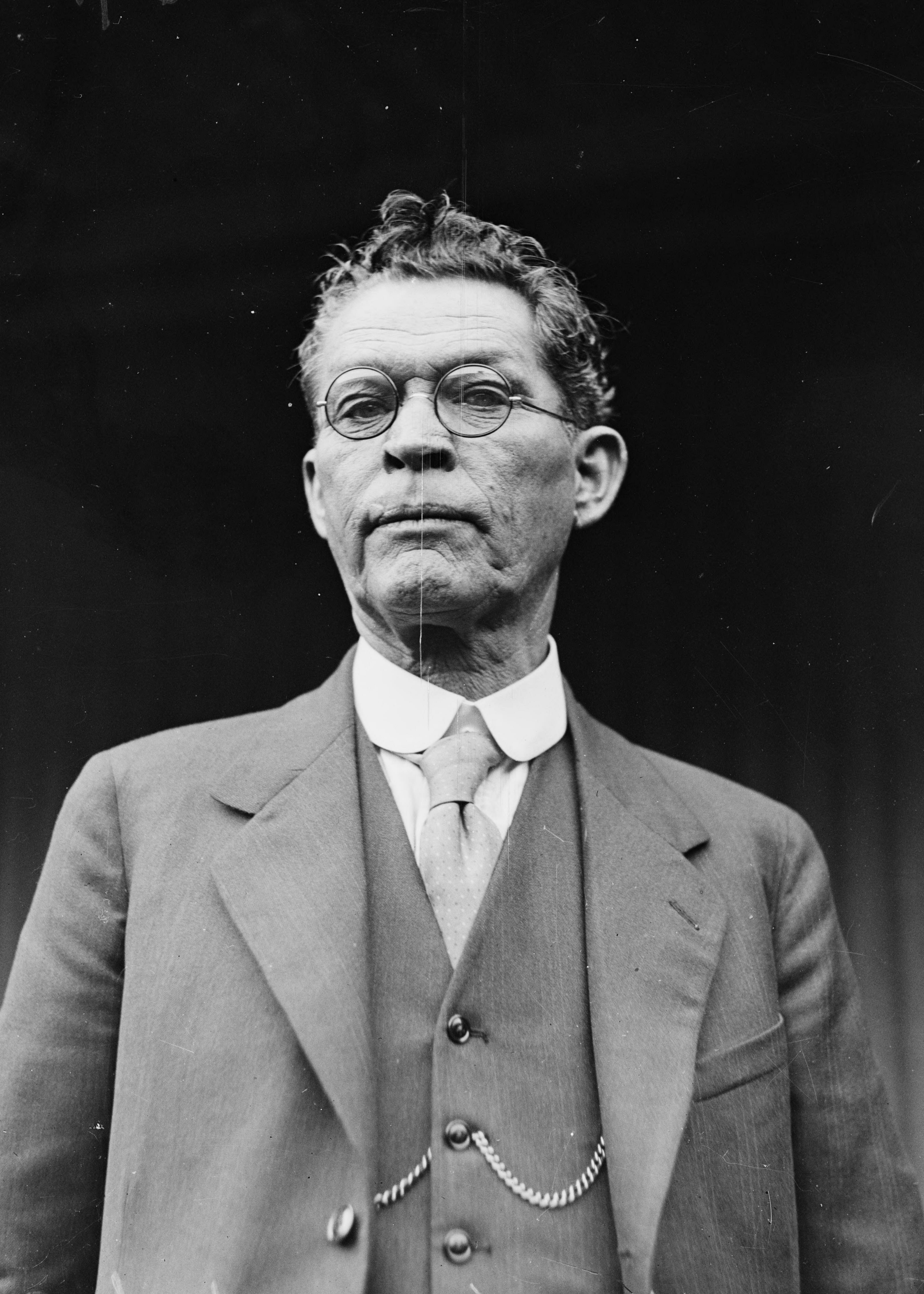
Grayndler in 1930

Grayndler was a foundation member of the Amalgamated Shearers' Union of Australasia, which was subsequently amalgamated into the Australian Workers' Union (AWU). He was appointed as a paid organiser of the AWU's shearers' section in 1895 and in 1900 became paid secretary of the AWU's Victoria–Riverina branch, based initially in St Arnaud and then in Ballarat. Grayndler resigned his position as secretary in 1909 due to ill health. He subsequently worked as a travelling salesman for Burgon & Ball for 18 months, and then briefly ran his own business in Victoria.

In 1911, AWU general secretary Donald Macdonnell convinced Grayndler to return to active involvement in the labour movement by representing the AWU at an important arbitration case. On 1 July 1912, he was appointed general secretary of the AWU in place of Tom White, who had resigned to ill health; White had in turn succeeded as general secretary upon Macdonnell's death the previous year. He served as general secretary until 1941, the longest term in the organisation's history.

In addition to his role as AWU general secretary, Grayndler was managing director of Labor Papers Limited (the publisher of The Australian Worker) from 1918 to 1924. He was nominated to several federal government positions as a representative of the labour movement, serving as a member of the Commonwealth Repatriation Commission from 1915 to 1918, as a member of the Bruce–Page government's industrial delegation to the United States in 1927, and as a member of the Lyons government's Commonwealth Wool Inquiry Committee in 1932.

=== Views ===
Grayndler was "an early and staunch advocate of the settlement of industrial disputes through arbitration". During World War I, he led the AWU in opposition to the Hughes government's proposals for overseas conscription, which led to the Australian Labor Party split of 1916. After the war's end he became a "leading strategist of the conservative response to the post-war radical trend in the labour movement". Grayndler initially supported the One Big Union movement. In 1912, he announced a scheme to merge the AWU with several smaller unions, with the hopes of doubling the AWU's membership. However, in 1919 he and AWU president Arthur Blakeley accused the Industrial Workers of the World of white-anting the AWU in its proposal for an amalgamation.

Grayndler was a strong supporter of the White Australia policy. He maintained the AWU's policy of refusing admission to non-white workers, specifically excluding "Chinese, Japanese, Kanakas and Afghans" from membership. In 1926, following a trip to the Dutch East Indies and British Malaya, he stated that he had "returned from the east a stronger advocate of the White Australia policy than ever before" and that white Australians "did as much work daily as a dozen natives". In a 1932 arbitration hearing, he asked a pastoralist why he had employed white men "on a nigger's wage".

In 1928, Grayndler withdrew the AWU's affiliation from the Australian Council of Trade Unions (ACTU), on the grounds that the ACTU had endangered the White Australia policy by joining the Pan-Pacific Trade Union Secretariat (PPTUS). He subsequently accused the ACTU of being a Communist front. In 1929 he again attacked the ACTU and the PPTUS, stating they would "open the gates to the colored hordes of China, India and Japan".

== Parliamentary politics ==
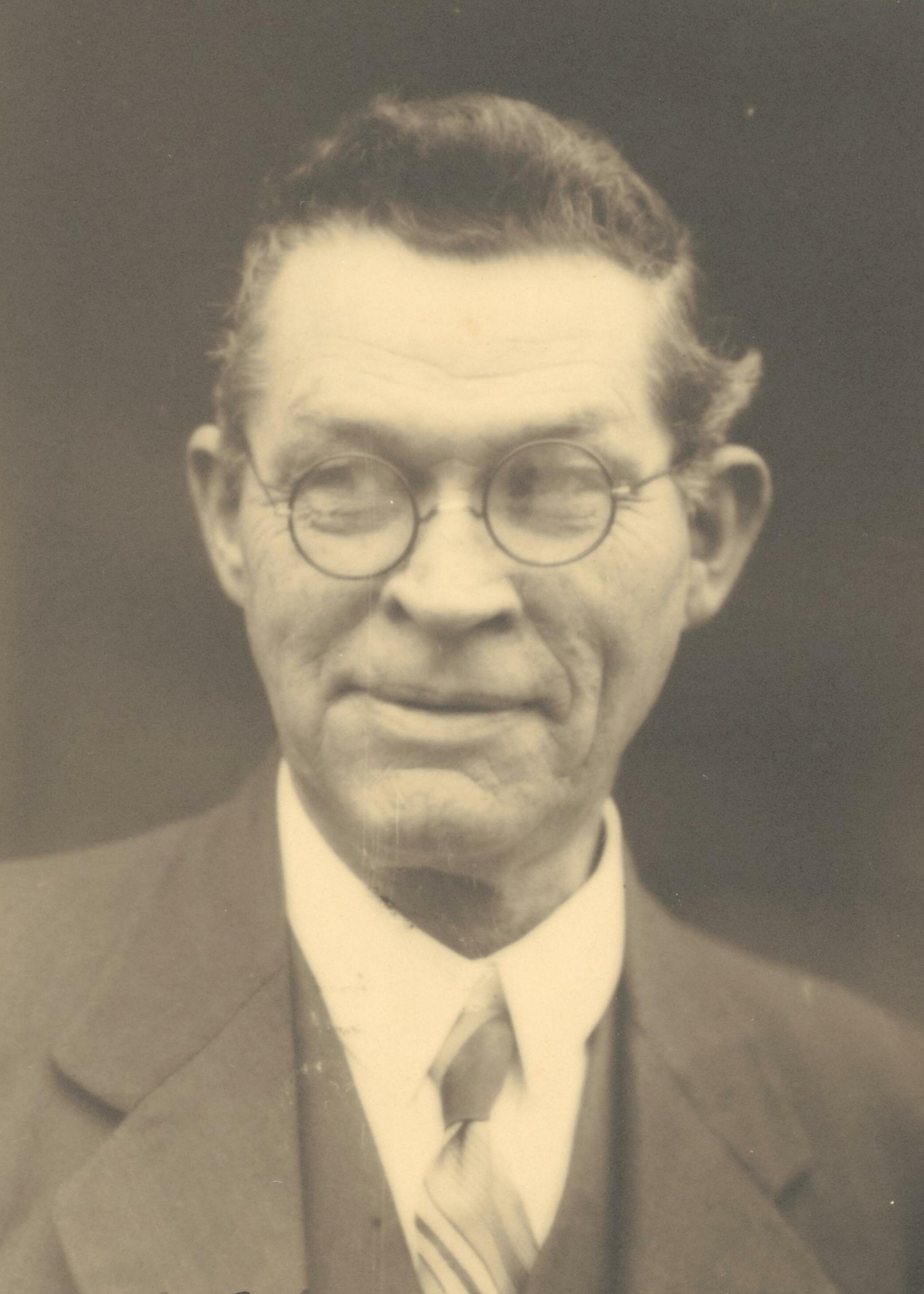
Grayndler in 1931

At the 1906 federal election, Grayndler unsuccessfully stood for the Australian Labor Party (ALP) in the Victorian seat of Grampians. In 1921 he was nominated to the New South Wales Legislative Council, which under the state's constitution at the time was a lifetime appointment. His term ended in 1934 when the council was reconstituted and made partially elective. He was subsequently elected to fill a casual vacancy in 1936 and remained a member until his death in 1943. Following the Australian Labor Party split of 1931, he and the AWU supported the Federal Labor faction against the dominant Lang Labor group in New South Wales.

=== Corruption allegations ===
In November 1936, ALP MP John Martin alleged in the Legislative Council that Grayndler's election to the council was corrupt and that he had conspired to rig the election in exchange for cash. The allegations were referred to a select committee, which cleared Grayndler of corruption.

== Personal life ==
Grayndler married Margaret Tamar Welsh in 1901, with whom he had two sons and two daughters. He lived in the Sydney suburb of Canterbury for most of his adult life. He died on 12 March 1943, aged 75, while visiting Melbourne to speak at the unveiling of a memorial to his AWU colleague John Barnes.

Grayndler was appointed Officer of the Order of the British Empire (OBE) in 1920. The Division of Grayndler in the federal House of Representatives was named in his honour in an electoral redistribution prior to the 1949 federal election.

== Notes ==
Trade union offices
Preceded by Tom White	General Secretary of the Australian Workers' Union; 1912 – 1941	Succeeded by Clarrie Fallon
