= Thomas Murray (Australian politician) =

Australian politician (1885–1969)

Thomas George Murray (9 January 1885 – 18 March 1969) was an Australian politician.

He was born at Canowindra, the son of George Murray. He was a stock and station agent and eventually purchased large tracts of property. On 25 November 1915 he married Clarissa Grant, with whom he had three daughters. A member of the Wheat Board from 1920, he was appointed to the New South Wales Legislative Council in 1921 as an Australian Labor Party nominee. He was expelled from the Labor Party in 1926 after voting against abolition of the Legislative Council, and remained on the council until 1958 as a conservative-leaning independent. Murray died in 1969 in Double Bay.
