= John Percival (politician) =

Australian politician

John Whitehead Percival (27 September 1870 – 1 February 1942) was an English-born Australian politician.

He was born in Huddersfield in Yorkshire to brass moulder William Percival and Hannah Whitehead. He worked as a newspaper manager, arriving in New South Wales around 1894. For 17 years he was the manager of the Bathurst National Advocate from 16 May 1904, until 21 December 1923, when he was forced to resign after being caught misusing company money.

On 18 October 1905 he married Emily Amelia Cartrell, with whom he had four children. He was appointed to the New South Wales Legislative Council in 1921 as a Labor member. Labor had long had a policy of abolishing the Legislative Council. On 23 February 1926 Albert Willis, the Representative of the Government in the Legislative Council sought leave to resume debate on the Constitution (Amendment) Bill (No. 2) that would abolish the Legislative Council however Percival and another Labor member Frank Bryant voted against the bill and it was defeated by 47 votes to 41. Percival and Bryant immediately resigned from the Labor party however on 5 March 1926 the party executive refused to accept their resignations and expelled them instead. He sat as an independent until 1931 when he supported the United Australia Party until the reconstitution of the Council in 1934, with members being elected, not directly by the people, but by a joint sitting of the New South Wales Parliament. He was a United Australia Party candidate at the first indirect election for the Legislative Council but was defeated.

Percival died at Randwick on 1 February 1942 (aged 71).
