= John Lane Mullins =

Australian politician (1857–1939)

The Honourable John Lane Mullins PC KCSG JP
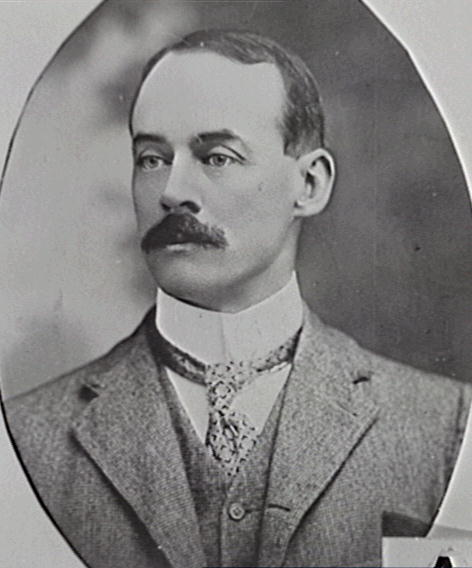

Member of the Legislative Council of New South Wales
- In office 17 July 1917 – 22 April 1934

Personal details
- Born: 12 June 1857 Sydney, Colony of New South Wales
- Died: 24 February 1939 (aged 81) Elizabeth Bay, New South Wales
- Resting place: South Head Cemetery
- Party: Nationalist
- Relations: Sir Thomas Hughes (brother in-law)

John Francis Lane Mullins PC KCSG JP (12 June 1857 – 24 February 1939) was an Australian politician and prominent Catholic layperson in the late nineteenth and early twentieth century New South Wales.

He was born in Sydney to clerk James Mullins and Eliza Lane from County Cork, Ireland. He studied at the University of Sydney, becoming a solicitor in 1885. On 14 April 1885 he married Jane Hughes, with whom he had five children. He served on Sydney City Council from 1900 to 1904 and from 1906 to 1912, and in 1903 was appointed Knight of St Gregory and Privy Chamberlain to Pope Pius X. From 1917 to 1934 he was a Nationalist (later United Australia Party) member of the New South Wales Legislative Council. Lane Mullins died at Elizabeth Bay in 1939. John Lane Mullins was an avid book collector and was known as the Australian founding father of the Australian Bookplate Movement and was the first President of the Australian Ex Libris Society.

He is buried at South Head Cemetery in Vaucluse, New South Wales.

== Arms ==
Coat of arms of John Lane Mullins

Notes
Confirmed by Nevile Wilkinson, Ulster King of Arms, 23 September 1909.
Crest
In front of a cross moline Or a Saracen's head affrontee couped at the shoulder Proper wreathed as in the arms.
Torse
A wreath of the colours.
Escutcheon
Quarterly 1st & 4th Azure on a cross moline Or a Saracen's head affrontee and erased Proper wreathed round the temples Argent and Gules in the first and fourth quarters a griffin passant of the second (Mullins) 2nd & 3rd a lion rampant Gules on a chief of the last two antique crowns Argent (Lane).
Motto
Ne Cede Malis

Government offices
Preceded by Sir Philip Whistler Street	President of the Board of Trustees of the Art Gallery of New South Wales; 1938–1939	Succeeded by B. J. Waterhouse
