= John Higgins (Australian politician) =

Australian politician

John Fortunatus Higgins (31 October 1884 – 28 July 1936) was an Australian politician.

He was born in Glenorchy to orchardist Matthew Higgins and Anne Barry. He attended school at New Town, Tasmania and became a journalist. On 2 February 1913 he married Marion Honoria Harlow; the following year he married Felicitas Laverty (known as Mina) on 24 December 1914. He and Mina had a daughter, Patricia Margaret Higgins in 1917. From 1921 to 1936 he was a Labor member of the New South Wales Legislative Council. He opposed Jack Lang and sat as Federal Labor in the 1930s. Higgins died at Rose Bay in 1936.
