= George Varley =

Australian politician

George Henry Gisborne Varley (7 April 1852 – 28 April 1936) was an English-born Australian politician.

He was born in London to picture dealer William Waterloo Gisborne Varley and Anne Daston. He migrated to New South Wales in 1861 and was educated at Maitland, where he became a newspaper proprietor. He worked for the Newcastle Herald and from 1881 managed the Clarence and Richmond Examiner, becoming proprietor in 1887. In 1871 he married Jane Louise Brackenreg, with whom he had six children. In 1905 he moved to Sydney, and his paper became the Daily Examiner. From 1917 to 1934 he was a member of the New South Wales Legislative Council for the Nationalist and United Australia parties. Varley died at Bellevue Hill in 1936.
