= Frank Wall (Australian politician) =

Australian politician

The Honourable Dr Frank Wall MLC

Member of New South Wales Legislative Council
- In office 17 July 1917 – 1 April 1941

Personal details
- Born: 6 October 1879 Randwick, New South Wales
- Died: 1 April 1941 (aged 61) Sydney, New South Wales
- Party: Nationalist Party; United Australia Party
- Spouse(s): 1. Gertrude Morison (née Scott); 2. Elizabeth Mary Eleanor (née Saywell)
- Children: 1 son
- Education: Sydney Grammar School; Newington College; University of Edinburgh
- Occupation: Medical Practitioner

Frank Edgar Wall (6 October 1879 – 1 April 1941) was an Australian medical practitioner and politician.

He was born in Randwick to customs agent George Wall and Sophia Jane Kidd. He attended Brighton College in Randwick, Sydney Grammar School, Newington College and the University of Edinburgh, where he qualified as a doctor in 1908. On 29 April 1907 he married Gertrude Morison Scott, with whom he had one son. He later married Elizabeth Mary Eleanor Saywell on 25 February 1936. In 1909 he settled in Burwood, and during World War I was registrar of Randwick Military Hospital. From 1917 to 1941 he was a member of the New South Wales Legislative Council, representing first the Nationalist Party and then the United Australia Party. Wall died in Sydney in 1941.
