= Michael Connington =

Australian politician

Michael Joseph Connington (1873 – 3 December 1930) was an Irish-born trade unionist, industrial advocate and politician. He was an Australian Labor Party member of the New South Wales Legislative Council from 1917 until his death.

Connington was born in County Roscommon in Ireland and migrated to Sydney with his family at a young age, where he was educated at Marist Brothers' College at Darlinghurst. He was a commercial traveller and then lived in New Zealand for several years. He later returned to New South Wales and was secretary of the Trolley, Draymen and Carters' Union of Sydney and Suburbs from 1901 to 1916 under Billy Hughes, who would become a close friend. Connington resigned from the union in 1916 when it came out against Hughes' support for conscription, but unlike Hughes did not leave the party in the 1916 Labor split. After his departure from the union, he began a prominent career as an industrial advocate. He was a member of the state executive of the Labor Party from 1910 to 1911, a justice of the peace, member of the State Necessary Commodities Commission in 1916, a member of the Commonwealth Shipbuilding Tribunal from 1918 to 1923, and the first life member of the Federated Clerks' Union.

Connington was well-known and well-respected as an industrial advocate and represented many different unions. The Sydney Morning Herald wrote that "he figured as industrial advocate in all the big cost of living and basic wage inquiries for many years". President of the Industrial Commission Albert Piddington described him as "the leading industrial advocate in that jurisdiction", stating that he "had set a standard of advocacy high enough for any Court in any country" and was "a master of the case-law of arbitration".

He was appointed to the Legislative Council in 1917 by the Nationalist Party government, receiving what was then a life appointment. Attorney General David Hall later wrote that Connington was appointed as the "best Labour man" that could be selected. In 1923, when questioned over his low attendance rate by The Daily Telegraph, Connington cited the demands of his ongoing industrial practice. He personally opposed the Lang government's unsuccessful attempts to abolish the Legislative Council, but voted to support abolition in parliament in line with his party.

He died at his home at Putney in 1930 and was buried at Rookwood Cemetery.
