= William Brooks (Australian politician) =

Australian politician

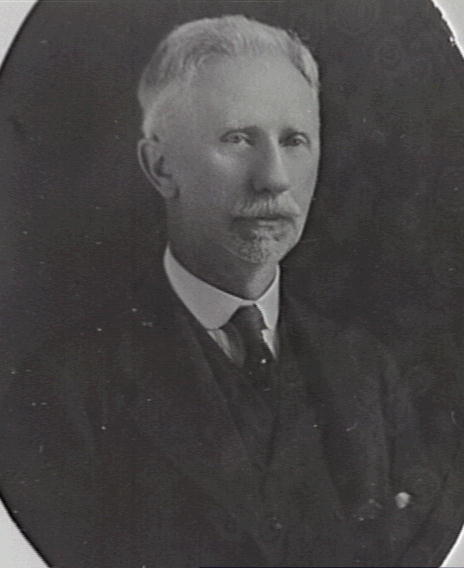
William Brooks, c.1924

William Brooks (31 December 1858 – 14 October 1937) was an English-born Australian politician.

He was born in Tiverton, Devon to lacehand James Brooks and Mary Ann Williams. He attended boarding school locally and began work as a compositor, migrating to Cape Colony in 1880 where he served in the Basuto Gun War. In 1884 he migrated to Sydney, working first as a compositor for the Sydney Morning Herald before running his own printing business. From 1919 to 1927 he served on Sydney City Council, and from 1911 to 1924 he was the president of the Master Printers' Association. From 1917 to 1934, Brooks served as a member of the New South Wales Legislative Council, representing first the Nationalist Party and then the United Australia Party. He died in Double Bay in 1937. Predeceased by his wife, he was survived by five daughters.
