= Arthur Trethowan =

Australian politician

Sir Arthur King Trethowan KCMG (14 September 1863 – 26 November 1937) was an Australian politician.

Born in Creswick, Victoria, to auctioneer Samuel Trethowan and Charlotte King, he attended Creswick Grammar School before becoming an auctioneer at Numurkah. On 9 November 1886 he married Jane Alice Manifold, with whom he had eleven children. Around 1898 he bought land at Berrigan, later expanding his interests to include property at Oaklands, Dubbo and the Upper Hunter. In 1907 he was elected to Urana Shire Council, where he served until 1915; he was president in 1908, 1912 and 1915. An active member of the Farmers' and Settlers' Association, he was a councillor from 1909 to 1911, vice-president from 1911 to 1916, president from 1916 to 1920, vice-president again from 1920 to 1930 and treasurer from 1930 to 1937; he was also active in the Progressive and Country parties. In 1916 he was appointed to the New South Wales Legislative Council, where he served until his death at Dubbo in 1937. He was appointed Knight Commander of the Order of St Michael and St George in 1936.
