= Henry Doyle (politician) =

Australian politician

Henry Martin Doyle (1859 – 29 January 1929) was an Australian politician.

He was born at Ballan, near Ballarat, to pioneer James Doyle. He attended St Patrick's College and then Mount Melleray Abbey before studying medicine in Paris and London. In England he became a member of the Royal College of Surgeons and the Royal College of Physicians, as well as the Society of Apothecaries. He was a supporter of Irish nationalism. He went to sea in 1889 as a medical officer, eventually settling in Newcastle as medical superintendent at Royal Newcastle Hospital in 1891. In 1912 he was appointed to the New South Wales Legislative Council by the Labor government, although he was not a reliable vote for Labor and moved further away following the 1916 conscription split. Doyle died at Darlinghurst in 1929.
