= Frank Bryant (politician) =

Australian politician

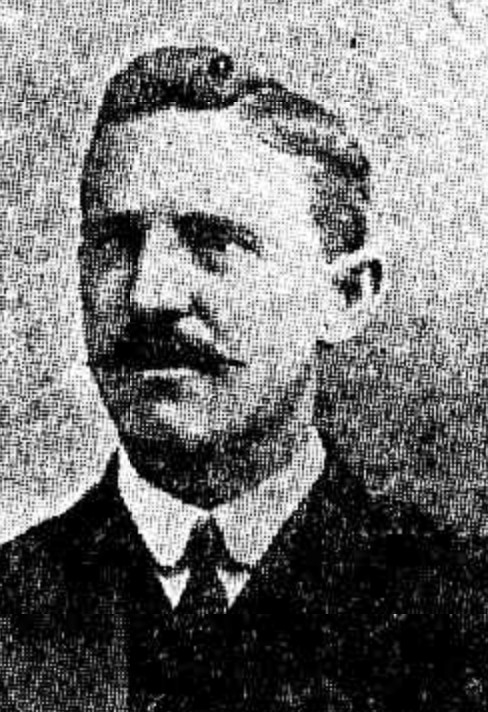
Frank Bryant MLC in 1912

Francis Henry Bryant (14 February 1864 – 16 September 1946) was an Australian politician.

He was born in West Maitland to baker Francis Michael Bryant and Harriett Horder. From 1885 to 1890 he worked for the Salvation Army across New South Wales, later working as a compositor. In 1882 he married Elizabeth Horder, with whom he had four children; he would later marry Harriett O'Connor on 10 March 1924. From 1905 to 1907 he was vice-president of the New South Wales Typographical Association, serving as president in 1906. He was appointed to the New South Wales Legislative Council in 1912 as a Labor member, having been president of that party's central executive from 1908 to 1909. He was appointed a member of the Metropolitan Board of Water Supply and Sewerage in 1916, 1918, and 1922.

He split with the Labor Party over conscription in the 1916 Labor split and campaigned for Nationalist Party candidates at the 1917 election, including William Holman (Cootamundra) John Nicholson (Wollongong). In 1920 he sought to be re-admitted to Labor, however this was denied. He was readmitted in August 1921, 1 of 4 Labor members in the council.

Labor had long had a policy of abolishing the Legislative Council. On 23 February 1926 Albert Willis, the Representative of the Government in the Legislative Council sought leave to resume debate on the Constitution (Amendment) Bill (No. 2) that would abolish the Legislative Council however Bryant and another labor member John Percival voted against the bill and it was defeated by 47 votes to 41. Bryant and Percival immediately resigned from the Labor party however on 5 March 1926 the party executive refused to accept their resignations and expelled them instead. He subsequently sat as a Nationalist and then for the United Australia Party until the reconstitution of the Council in 1934, with members being elected, not directly by the people, but by a joint sitting of the New South Wales Parliament. He was a United Australia Party candidate at the first indirect election for the Legislative Council but was defeated.

He sought pre-selection for the United Australia Party as a candidate for the 1940 half Senate election, but was not selected.

Bryant died at Lidcombe on 16 September 1946 (aged 82).
