= Joseph Browne (politician) =

Australian politician

Joseph Alexander Browne KC (25 February 1876 – 11 November 1946) was an Australian politician and judge.

He was born at Adelong to farmers Edward and Eliza Jane Browne. He was educated at Grenfell and then at Fort Street High School, then working as a teacher from 1891 to 1903. He worked as a clerk while studying at night, graduating from the University of Sydney in 1904 whereupon he was called to the bar. On 21 January 1909 he married Laura Hannah Amos, with whom he had four children. He specialised in industrial law, and in 1912 was appointed to the New South Wales Legislative Council by the Labor government, although he was not a party member and was not always a reliable Labor vote. Appointed King's Counsel in 1926, he resigned from the Council in 1932 to become Chief Industrial Commissioner. He resigned from this position in 1942 due to failing health and died at Potts Point in 1946.
