= John Wetherspoon =

Farmer and politician in New South Wales, Australia (1844-1928)

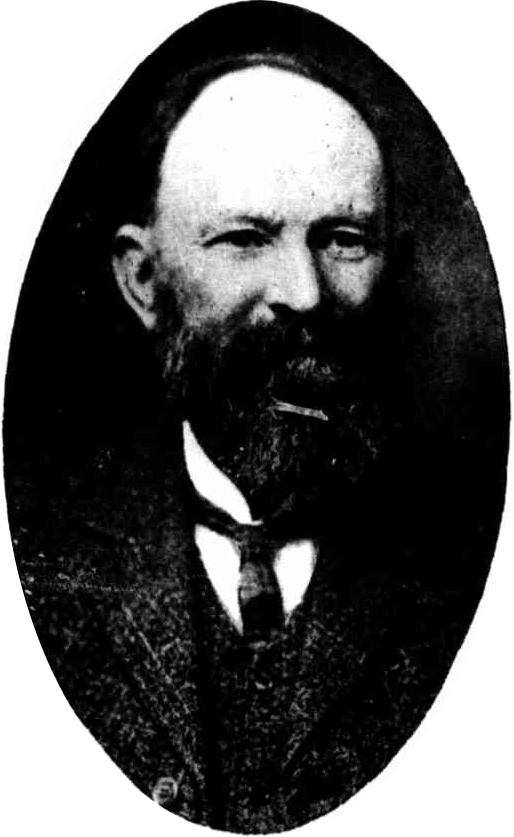

John Wetherspoon (13 July 1844 – 12 June 1928) was a Scottish-born farmer and politician in New South Wales, Australia.

He was born at Newburgh in Fifeshire to farmer Andrew Wetherspoon and Helen Marr. He migrated to New South Wales in 1853, becoming a shepherd in New England and then an overseer, eventually managing a station on the Liverpool Plains. In around 1871 he purchased land at Glen Innes, and on 20 December 1871 he married Catherine Crothers, with whom he had a daughter.

He stood unsuccessfully for the Legislative Assembly seat of Glen Innes at the 1895 election as a Free Trade candidate, finishing 3rd with 19.4% of the vote, and at 1898 election as an independent, again finishing 3rd with 7.3% of the vote.

He was closely involved with the Farmers' and Settlers' Association of New South Wales, serving as an executive member from 1901 to 1914 and as vice-president from 1904 to 1909 and from 1911 to 1914. He was appointed a temporarily councilor for the Severn Shire council on its creation in 1906. In 1908 he was appointed to the New South Wales Legislative Council as a Liberal. He held his seat until his death. He did not regularly attend parliament, around 10% of sitting days, and rarely spoke.

He died at his property Glencoe near Glen Innes in 1928 (aged 83).
