= Andrew Sinclair (politician) =

Australian politician

Andrew Sinclair (1861 – 28 June 1938) was a Scottish-born Australian politician.

He was born in Dunfermline to cabinetmaker Richard Sinclair and Anne Dewar. He migrated to Australia around 1893 and managed a joinery department. On 30 March 1899 he married Sarah Jane Clark, with whom he had three sons. He was a member of the Australian Socialist League from 1893 to 1894 and was on the staff of the Australian Workman. In 1912 he was appointed to the New South Wales Legislative Council as a Labor nominee. He left the party in the conscription split in 1916 and became a Nationalist, remaining in the Legislative Council until its reconstitution in 1934. Sinclair died at Ashfield in 1938.
