= John Travers (New South Wales politician) =

Australian politician

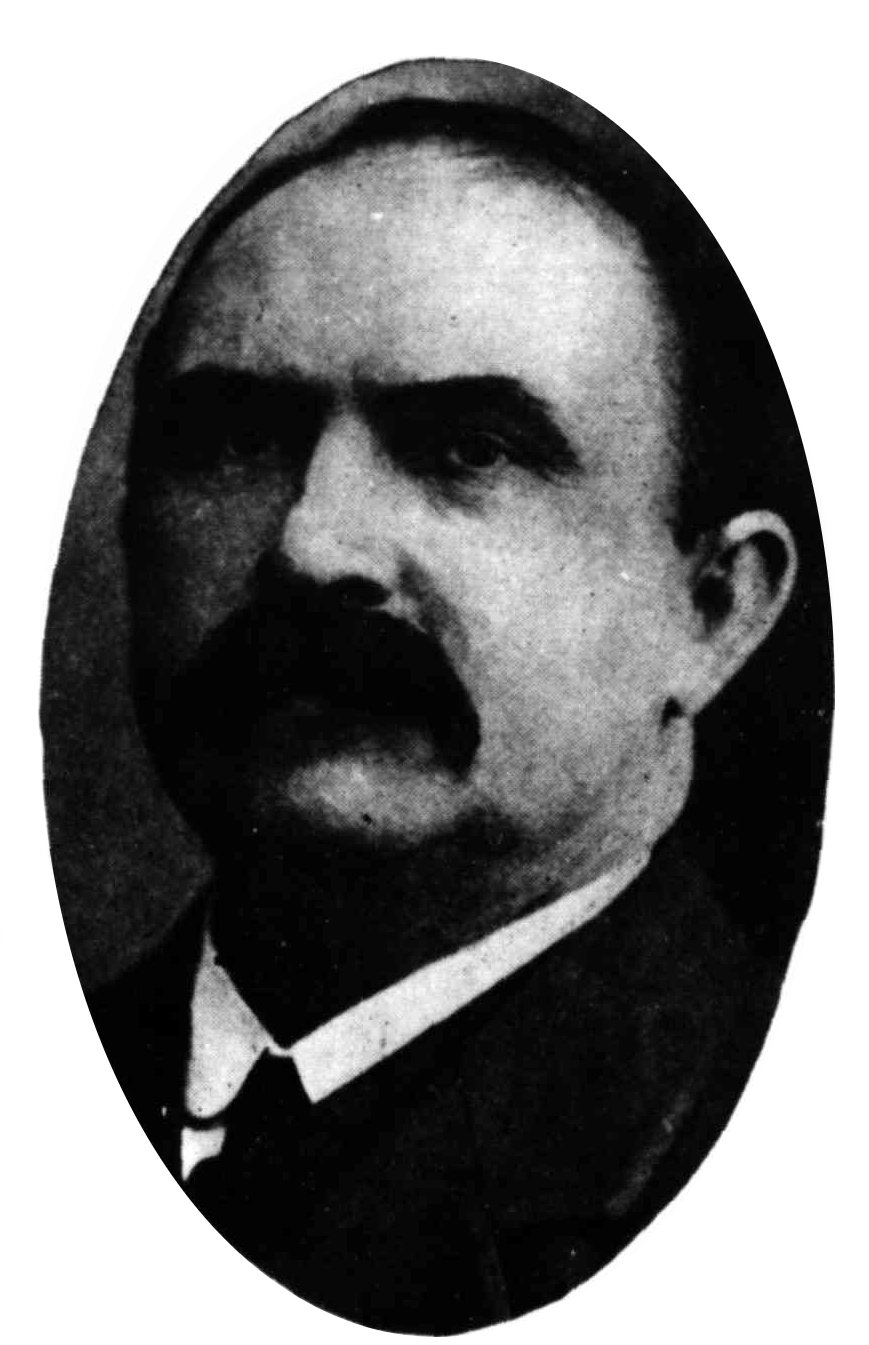
John Travers MLC

John Travers (1866 – 16 April 1943) was an Irish-born Australian politician. He was a member of the New South Wales Legislative Council from 1908 to 1934. He was a Labor member when appointed but later resigned to sit as an independent.

== Early life ==
He was born in Cork to sea captain John Travers and Ellen McCarthy. (Note: His parliamentary biography states he was born in 1866, while his obituaries state he was born in 1871.) He migrated to Australia and became a shipwright, serving as secretary of the Shipwrights Provident Union of New South Wales from around 1892 until his appointment to the Legislative Council in 1908. He served as president of the Eight Hour Day Committee and was a member of the central executive of the Labor Party from 1907, until March 1908 when he resigned due to his inability to regularly attend meetings.

== Legislative Council ==
Travers was a member of the New South Wales Legislative Council, appointed in 1908, and serving until 1934. He was a Labor member when appointed by the Wade Liberal government, however he did not sign the Labor pledge until 1911. He was still a Labor member in January 1913, however he resigned from the party some time prior to 1921. In 1926 he voted against the Lang Labor government's bill to abolish the Legislative Council.

He was a member of the Legislative Council's Public Works Committee for twenty years. He did not seek re-election when the Legislative Council was reconstituted to end life appointments in 1934.

== Later life and death ==
Travers was a member of the board of directors of the Illawarra and South Coast Steam Navigation Company from 1920 until his death in 1943. He was a member of the board of directors of Sydney Hospital from 1913 until 1938, the last 11 years as its president.

He died at Crows Nest in 1943 (aged 71–77) and was buried at Waverley Cemetery.
