= John Farleigh (politician) =

Politician and manufacturer in New South Wales, Australia

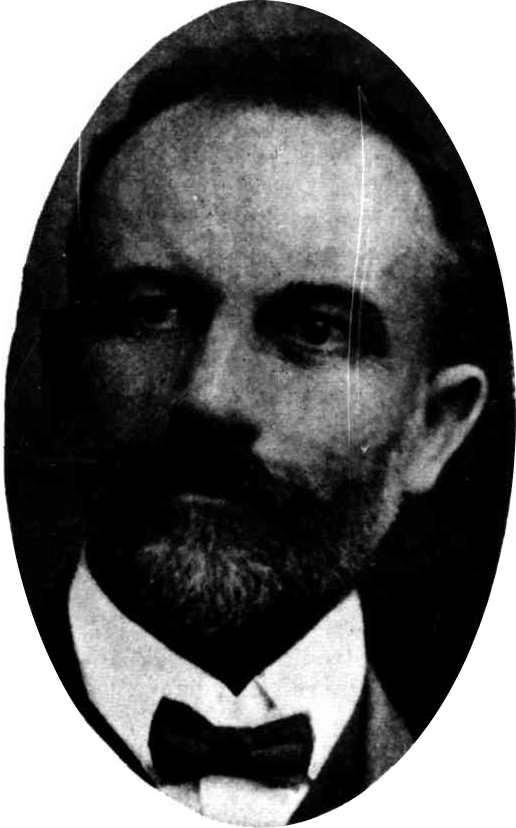

John Gibson Farleigh (1861 – 5 May 1949) was an Irish-born politician and manufacturer in New South Wales, Australia.

He was born in County Sligo to merchant Edward Manicom Farleigh and Elizabeth née Gibson. In 1865 his family migrated to Victoria, and he settled in Sydney in 1874, where he became an office boy and then a clerk. He eventually became a leather goods manufacturer and senior partner in a company. On 13 November 1883 he married Alice Elizabeth Howard, with whom he had five children, 2 daughters and 3 sons.

From 1903 to 1908 he was a Rockdale alderman, and he was active in the free trade cause. He was closely involved in the fusion of anti-Labor parties in 1909, and served on the council of the Liberal, Nationalist and United Australia parties. In 1908 he was appointed to the New South Wales Legislative Council, serving until 1934. The Legislative Council was reconstituted to end life appointments in 1934 and he was a candidate at the first election, but was unsuccessful.

Farleigh died at Camperdown in 1949 (aged 87–88).
