= John Hepher =

Australian politician

John Hepher (16 October 1850 – 3 August 1932) was an English-born Australian politician.

He was born in Swavesey, Cambridgeshire, to John Hepher (tailor) and Esther Wilderspin. He followed his father's trade and was also active in the union movement around Newcastle-on-Tyne. He migrated to New South Wales around 1882, and on 5 December 1884 married Edith Penrose Robinson, with whom he had seven children. He was foundation chairman of the Redfern Labour League, served as treasurer of the Australian Socialist League in 1894, and was president of the New South Wales Tailors' Union. He helped draft the first Labor Party platform, and was president and trustee of the Eight-Hour Committee. In 1899 he was appointed to the New South Wales Legislative Council. He remained there until his death in Sydney in 1932.
