= George Earp =

Australian politician

George Frederick Earp
- Born: 24 January 1858; Nottingham, England
- Died: 12 March 1933 (aged 75); Edgecliff, Australia
- Resting place: Waverley Cemetery, Sydney
- Occupations: shipping agent, politician
- Title: member of the New South Wales Legislative Council
- Term: 1900–1933
- Political party: Nationalist Party; United Australia Party

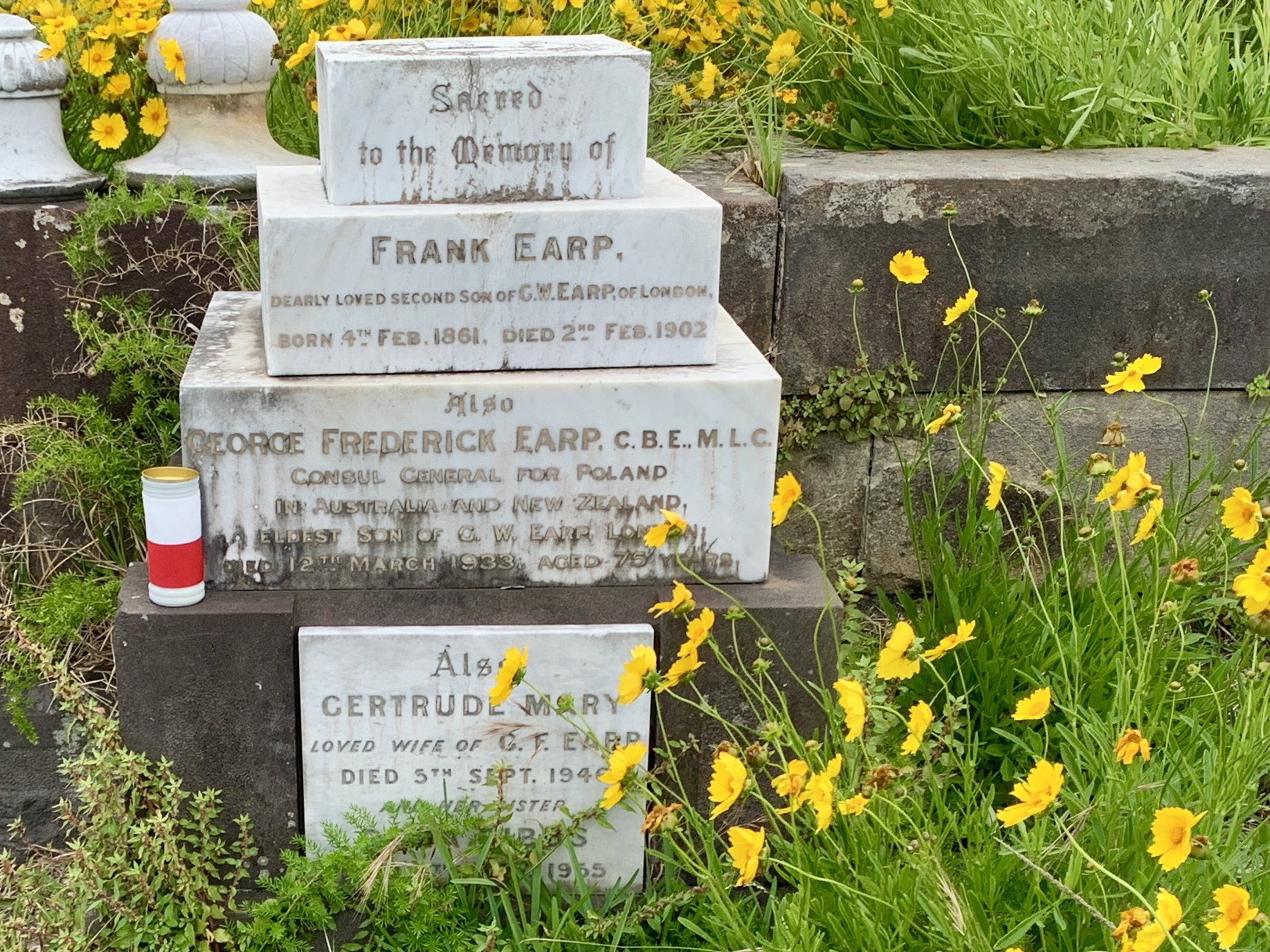
Earp's and his family grave (2024)

George Frederick Earp CBE (24 January 1858 – 12 March 1933) was an English-born Australian politician.

He was born in Nottingham to railway clerk George William Earp and Priscilla Martin. He attended Derby Grammar School and Beaufort House in London, and migrated to New South Wales in 1883. He settled in Newcastle, where he worked as a shipping agent, eventually partnering with his brothers in a firm. On 6 May 1893 he married Gertrude Mary Saddington, with whom he had five children. He was president of the Newcastle Chamber of Commerce from 1899 to 1900. In 1900 he was appointed to the New South Wales Legislative Council by Premier William Lyne. In 1919, he became honorary consul of Poland in Sydney. He was appointed Commander of the Order of the British Empire in 1920. He remained in the Council as a supporter of conservative parties until his death at Edgecliff in 1933.

In 1921, he was honored Knight's Cross of the Order of Polonia Restituta.
