= Nicholas Buzacott =

Australian politician (1866 – 1933)

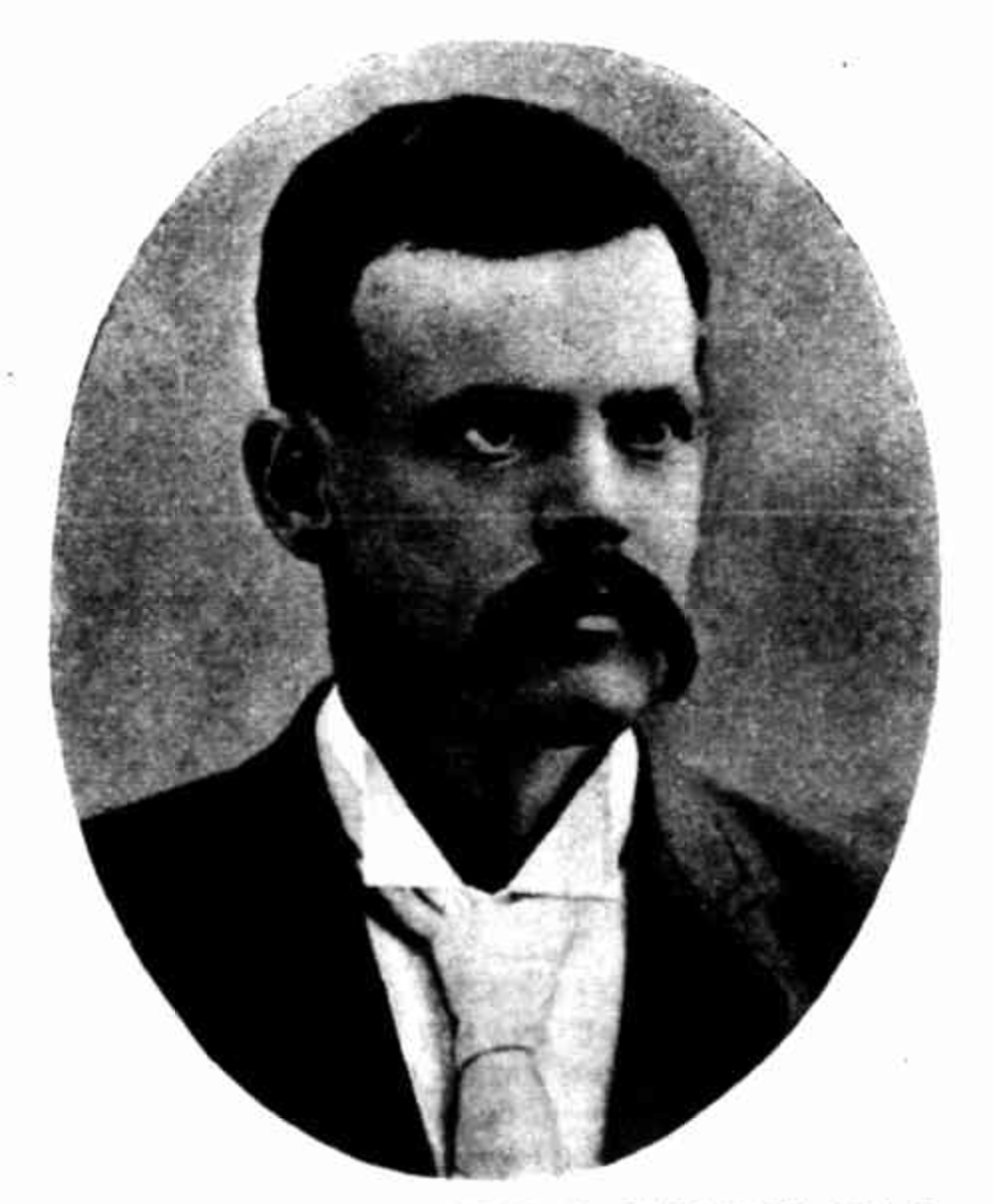
Nicholas Buzzacott MLC in 1899

Nicholas James Buzacott (23 February 1866 – 10 June 1933) was an Australian politician.

He was born at Clare in South Australia, the son of farmer Richard Buzacott and Margaret McKinnon. He worked as a wheelwright, before moving to Broken Hill around 1888, where he worked as a coach builder. He was a local alderman from 1898 to 1899 and was a contributor to the labour press. In 1899 he was appointed to the New South Wales Legislative Council as a Labor member, moving to Sydney where he established a real estate business. He left the Labor Party in the 1916 split over conscription, and joined the Nationalist Party. From 1918 to 1924 he was an alderman at Newtown (mayor in 1924), and from 1928 to 1931 at Canterbury. Buzacott died at Ashbury in 1933. His brother Richard was a senator from Western Australia.

Civic offices
Preceded by William Pritchard	Mayor of Newtown; 1923 – 1924	Succeeded by William Dibble
