= Alfred Meeks =

Australian politician

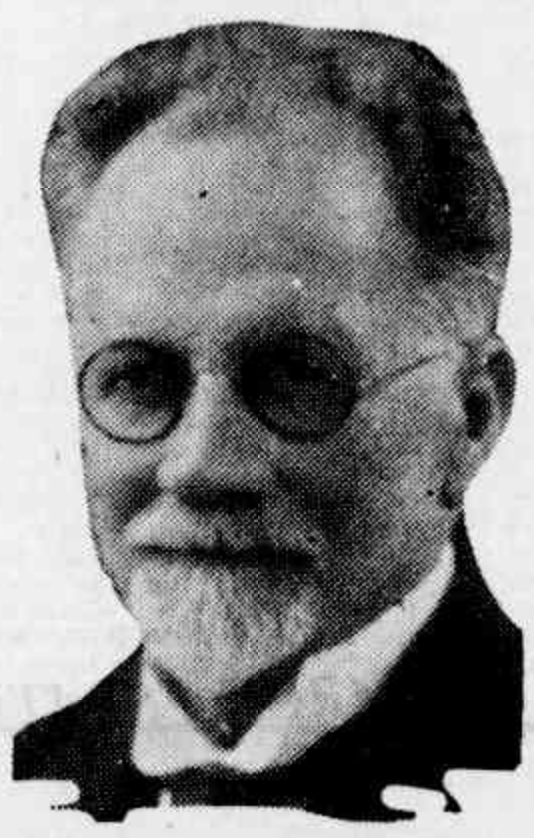
Sir Alfred Meeks, MLC

Sir Alfred William Meeks KBE (15 April 1849 – 6 March 1932) was an English-born Australian politician.

He was born at Cheltenham to shoemaker William Meeks and Maria Healing. He migrated to Melbourne at the age of five with his family, and attended St James Grammar School. He worked in business, and on 14 October 1873 married Alice Freeman, with whom he had two children. In 1878 he was appointed a departmental manager for Gibbs, Bright & Co., and he opened branches in Adelaide and Sydney, where he became resident partner in 1888. He was also a director of the National Bank of Australasia and held a number of other directorships. In 1900 he was appointed to the New South Wales Legislative Council. He was created a Knight Commander of the Order of the British Empire in 1920, and remained in the Council until his death at Darling Point in 1932.
