= Members of the New South Wales Legislative Council, 1932–1934 =

Members of the New South Wales Legislative Council who served from 1932 to 1934 were appointed for life by the Governor on the advice of the Premier. This list includes members between the 1932 state election on 11 June 1932 and the introduction of an indirectly elected chamber on 22 April 1934. The President was Sir John Peden. The council had been flooded in 1931 raising the number of members from 85 to 110. The appointment of additional members in September 1932 raised the number of members of the council to an all-time peak of 125.

Name	Party	Years in office
William Ainsworth	Labor (NSW)	1925–1934
Carl Akhurst	Independent	1925–1934
Alexander Alam	Labor (NSW)	1925–1958, 1963–1973
George Archer	Labor (NSW)	1925–1949
James Ashton	United Australia	1907–1934
George Bassett (Note: George Bassett was appointed on 21 September 1932.)	Country	1932–1964
Alfred Binks (Note: 14 members were appointed on 8 September 1932.)	United Australia	1932–1952
George Black	United Australia	1917–1934
Francis Boyce (Note: Francis Boyce resigned on 17 June 1932.)	United Australia	1923–1932
Sir Henry Braddon	United Australia	1917–1940
William Brennan (Note: William Brennan resigned on 9 February 1934.)	Labor (NSW)	1925–1934
Charles Bridges	Labor (NSW)	1925–1937, 1940–1943
William Brooks	United Australia	1917–1934
Joseph Browne (Note: Joseph Browne resigned on 20 June 1932.)	Independent	1912–1932
Francis Bryant	United Australia	1912–1934
George Buckley	Labor (NSW)	1931–1934
Nicholas Buzacott (Note: Nicholas Buzacott died on 10 June 1933.)	United Australia	1899–1933
Walter Cambridge	Country	1932–1946
Sir Joseph Carruthers (Note: Sir Joseph Carruthers died on 10 December 1932.)	United Australia	1908–1932
Joseph Coates	Federal Labor	1921–1943
Stanley Cole	United Australia	1927–1934
Edward Collins	United Australia	1932–1934, 1934–1936
Arthur Colvin	United Australia	1932–1955
James Concannon	Labor (NSW)	1925–1958
Lawrence Cotter	Independent	1925–1934
Lionel Courtenay	United Australia	1932–1934
John Cowburn	Labor (NSW)	1931–1934
John Culbert	Labor (NSW)	1925–1943
John Davoren	Labor (NSW)	1931–1934
George Dewar	Labor (NSW)	1921–1934
William Dick (Note: William Dick died on 1 July 1932.)	United Australia	1907–1932
William Dickson	Labor (NSW)	1925–1934, 1940–1966
Thomas Doyle	Labor (NSW)	1925–1934
Maxwell Dunlop	Country	1932–1941
George Earp (Note: George Earp died on 12 March 1933.)	United Australia	1900–1933
Thomas Falkingham	Labor (NSW)	1931–1934
John Farleigh	United Australia	1908–1934
Ernest Farrar	United Australia	1912–1952
Robert Fitzgerald (Note: Robert Fitzgerald died on 24 December 1933.)	United Australia	1901–1933
James Fox	Labor (NSW)	1931–1934
William Gibb	Labor (NSW)	1931–1934, 1943–1952
Thomas Gordon (Note: Thomas Gordon was appointed on 14 September 1932.)	United Australia	1932–1934
Donald Grant	Labor (NSW)	1931–1940
Edward Grayndler	Federal Labor	1921–1934, 1936–1943
Catherine Green (Note: Catherine Green resigned on 7 September 1932.)	Labor (NSW)	1931–1932
Ronald Grieve	United Australia	1932–1934
Herbert Hawkins (Note: Herbert Hawkins and Henry Manning were appointed on 23 June 1932.)	United Australia	1932–1939
Alfred Hemsley	United Australia	1927–1934
John Hepher (Note: John Hepher died on 3 August 1932.)	Labor (NSW)	1899–1932
Simon Hickey	Labor (NSW)	1925–1934
John Higgins	Federal Labor	1921–1936
Thomas Holden	Federal Labor	1912–1934
Henry Horne	United Australia	1917–1955
Sir Norman Kater	Country	1923–1955
Edward Kavanagh	Labor (NSW)	1912–1934
John Keegan	Federal Labor	1925–1934
William Kelly (Note: William Kelly died on 9 December 1932.)	Independent	1925–1932
John Kilburn	Labor (NSW)	1931–1934
Robert King	Labor (NSW)	1931–1960
William Kirkness	United Australia	1927–1934
John Mullins	United Australia	1917–1934
William Latimer	United Australia	1920–1934
James Lyons	Independent	1925–1934
James Macarthur-Onslow	United Australia	1922–1934
Kenneth Mackay	United Australia	1899–1934
Edward Magrath	Labor (NSW)	1925–1943
Robert Mahony	Labor (NSW)	1921–1961
James Malone	Independent	1925–1934
Henry Manning	United Australia	1932–1958
John Martin	Labor (NSW)	1931–1946
Joseph Martin	Labor (NSW)	1931–1934
Patrick McGirr	Labor (NSW)	1921–1955
Roydon McKillop (Note: Roydon McKillop was appointed on 7 November 1932, but did not take his seat.)	Country	1932
Alan McNamara	Labor (NSW)	1931–1934, 1937–1955
James Minahan	Federal Labor	1925–1934
Voltaire Molesworth	United Australia	1932–1934
Wilson Moses (Note: Wilson Moses was appointed on 13 September 1932.)	Country	1932–1934
Henry Moulder	Country	1932–1946
George Mullins	Labor (NSW)	1931–1948
Sir James Murdoch	United Australia	1923–1934
Thomas Murray	Independent	1921–1958
George Nesbitt	Country	1927–1940
Harold Nicholas	United Australia	1932–1935
Broughton O'Conor	United Australia	1908–1940
John O'Regan	Federal Labor	1921–1940
John Francis O'Reilly	Labor (NSW)	1931–1934
John Joseph O'Reilly (Note: John Joseph O'Reilly died on 13 May 1933.)	Labor (NSW)	1931–1933
Charles Parker	United Australia	1932–1934
Sir John Peden	United Australia	1917–1946
John Percival	United Australia	1921–1934
Robert Pillans	Labor (NSW)	1925–1934
Thomas Playfair	United Australia	1927–1966
Frank Pollard	Labor (NSW)	1931–1934
Daniel Rees	Labor (NSW)	1931–1934
William Robson	United Australia	1920–1951
Frederick Roels	Labor (NSW)	1931–1934
James Ryan	United Australia	1917–1940
Mick Ryan	Federal Labor	1925–1943
Robert Savage	Labor (NSW)	1931–1934, 1943–1959
Thomas Shakespeare	United Australia	1923–1934
Andrew Sinclair	United Australia	1912–1934
Gilbert Sinclair	Labor (NSW)	1931–1934
Duncan Smith	Federal Labor	1925–1934
Sir James Smith	Independent	1912–1934
Samuel Smith	Labor (NSW)	1931–1940
Tom Smith	Labor (NSW)	1921–1934
Ernest Sommerlad	Country	1932–1952
Frank Spicer	Federal Labor	1925–1973
Robert Sproule	Labor (NSW)	1920–1934
Thomas Storey	Federal Labor	1921–1934
John Suttor	Labor (NSW)	1921–1934
Colin Tannock	Labor (NSW)	1931–1952
Sir Allen Taylor	United Australia	1912–1940
Frederick Tout (Note: Frederick Tout was appointed on 27 October 1932.)	Country	1932–1946
John Travers	Labor (NSW)	1908–1934
Arthur Trethowan	Country	1916–1937
Thomas Tyrrell	Labor (NSW)	1925–1942
George Varley	United Australia	1917–1934
Thomas Waddell	United Australia	1917–1934
Sir Samuel Walder	United Australia	1932–1943
Frank Wall	United Australia	1917–1941
Winter Warden	United Australia	1917–1934
Ellen Webster	Labor (NSW)	1931–1934
Harold White	United Australia	1932–1934
Albert Willis (Note: Albert Willis died on 20 May 1933.)	Federal Labor	1925–1933
John Wise	United Australia	1917–1934
Hugh Wragge (Note: Hugh Wragge was appointed on 15 September 1932.)	Country	1932–1949
Edwin Wrench	Labor (NSW)	1925–1934
Arthur Yager	Labor (NSW)	1925–1934

== See also ==
- Stevens ministry
