= Minister without portfolio (New South Wales) =

Former government minister in New South Wales, Australia

Minister without portfolio of New South Wales
- Appointer: Governor of New South Wales
- Formation: 1 March 1901
- First holder: Paddy Crick
- Final holder: John McMahon
- Abolished: 1 April 1959

Minister without portfolio or Honorary Minister was the title given to a member of the Cabinet who did not have responsibility for a department or portfolio. They were not paid in addition to their allowance as a member of parliament. The title was first used in the Lyne ministry in 1901 when Paddy Crick ceased to be Postmaster-General as a result of the Federation of Australia and remained in the Cabinet until he was appointed Secretary for Lands in the See ministry. The first people appointed without a portfolio were James Hayes, and Walter Bennett in the See ministry. The ministers without a portfolio were often given specific responsibilities using section 36 of the Constitution of New South Wales under which the Governor could authorise any member of the cabinet to perform the duties of another minister, except for the Attorney General. The title was last used in the third Cahill ministry. From 1959 the title "minister assisting ..." or "assistant minister ..." has been used.

== List of ministers ==
Responsibilities	Minister	Party	Ministry	Term start	Term end	Time in office	Notes
	Paddy Crick	Protectionist	Lyne	1 March 1901	10 April 1901	40 days	
	James Hayes	Progressive	See	11 April 1901	14 June 1904	3 years, 64 days	
	Walter Bennett	Progressive	See	16 April 1901	14 June 1904	3 years, 59 days	
	John Fegan	Progressive	See	24 March 1903	14 June 1904	1 year, 82 days	
Assisting Treasurer	William Dick	Liberal Reform	Carruthers	29 August 1904	1 October 1907	3 years, 33 days	
	James Brunker	Liberal Reform	Carruthers	12 June 1905	1 October 1907	2 years, 111 days	
	James Ashton	Liberal Reform	Wade	2 October 1907	25 June 1909	1 year, 265 days	
	Charles Oakes	Liberal Reform	Wade	2 October 1907	20 October 1910	3 years, 18 days	
	Campbell Carmichael	Labor	McGowen	21 October 1910	10 September 1911	2 years, 251 days	
Assisting Minister of Agriculture	John Treflé	Labor	McGowen	21 October 1910	6 November 1911	1 year, 16 days	
	John Dacey	Labor	McGowen	10 November 1911	26 November 1911	16 days	
Assistant Treasurer	Henry Hoyle	Labor	Holman (1)	29 January 1914	31 October 1916	2 years, 276 days	
	William Grahame	Labor	Holman (1)	15 March 1915	1 June 1915	78 days	
	Charles Oakes	Nationalist	Holman (2)	18 July 1919	9 February 1920	206 days	
Acting Minister of Public Health	David Storey	Nationalist	Holman (2)	15 November 1916	18 July 1919	2 years, 245 days	
Premier	William Holman	Nationalist	Holman (2)	30 October 1918	12 April 1920	1 year, 165 days	
Assisting Secretary for Lands	John Crane	Nationalist	Holman (2)	9 February 1920	12 April 1920	63 days	
Assisting Minister of Agriculture	Arthur Grimm	Nationalist	Holman (2)	9 February 1920	12 April 1920	63 days	
Assistant Minister of Justice	Bill McKell	Labor	Storey	12 April 1920	21 December 1920	253 days	
Assistant Treasurer	Bill McKell	Labor	Lang (1)	17 June 1925	7 June 1927	1 year, 355 days	
Assistant Treasurer	Robert Cruickshank	Labor	Lang (2)	19 September 1927	18 October 1927	29 days	
Assistant Treasurer	Bertram Stevens	Nationalist	Bavin	18 October 1927	15 April 1929	1 year, 179 days	
Assistant Treasurer	Eric Spooner	United Australia	Stevens (1) (2)	18 June 1932	21 August 1935	3 years, 64 days	
Assistant Minister in the Legislative Council	James Ryan	United Australia	Stevens (1) (2)	18 June 1932	13 April 1938	5 years, 299 days	
Assisting the Minister for Labour and Industry	Herbert Hawkins	United Australia	Stevens (1)	18 June 1932	5 January 1933	201 days	
Assistant Colonial Secretary	Herbert Hawkins	United Australia	Stevens (1) (2)	5 January 1933	21 August 1935	2 years, 187 days	
	Herbert FitzSimons	United Australia	Stevens (1)	15 February 1933	10 February 1935	1 year, 360 days	
	James Shand	United Australia	Stevens (2)	22 August 1935	13 April 1938	2 years, 234 days	
	George Gollan	United Australia	Stevens (2)	2 April 1937	13 April 1938	1 year, 11 days	
	Colin Sinclair	United Australia	Stevens (2)	29 June 1937	31 January 1938	216 days	
	Alexander Mair	United Australia	Stevens (2)	13 April 1938	1 June 1938	49 days	
	Athol Richardson	United Australia	Stevens (2)	13 April 1938	13 October 1938	183 days	
	Marsden Manfred	United Australia	Stevens (2) Mair	26 June 1939	16 May 1941	40 days	
	Hubert Primrose	United Australia	Stevens (2)	26 June 1939	5 August 1939	40 days	
	Hubert Primrose	United Australia	Mair	5 September 1939	16 May 1941	1 year, 253 days	
	Carlo Lazzarini	Labor	McKell (1)	16 May 1941	8 June 1944	3 years, 23 days	
	William Dickson	Labor	McKell (1)	16 May 1941	8 June 1944	3 years, 23 days	
	Clive Evatt	Labor	McKell (2)	8 June 1944	9 May 1946	1 year, 335 days	
	William Dickson	Labor	McKell (2)	8 June 1944	6 February 1947	2 years, 243 days	
	George Weir	Labor	McKell (2)	25 February 1946	9 May 1946	73 days	
	William Dickson	Labor	McGirr (1) (2)	6 February 1947	9 March 1948	102 days	
	Joshua Arthur	Labor	McGirr (2)	15 September 1949	21 September 1949	6 days	
	Frank Hawkins	Labor	McGirr (3)	30 June 1950	2 April 1952	1 year, 277 days	
	George Enticknap	Labor	Cahill (1)	3 April 1952	3 November 1952	214 days	
	George Weir	Labor	Cahill (1)	3 November 1952	23 February 1953	112 days	
	John McGrath	Labor	Cahill (2)	23 February 1953	2 September 1954	1 year, 191 days	
	Francis Buckley	Labor	Cahill (2)	23 February 1953	16 September 1953	205 days	
	William Gollan	Labor	Cahill (2)	16 September 1953	1 July 1954	288 days	
	Roger Nott	Labor	Cahill (2)	10 May 1954	15 March 1956	1 year, 310 days	
	Jim Maloney	Labor	Cahill (2)	1 July 1954	15 March 1956	1 year, 258 days	
	William Gollan	Labor	Cahill (3)	15 March 1956	22 November 1957	1 year, 252 days	
	Jim Simpson	Labor	Cahill (3)	15 March 1956	22 November 1957	1 year, 252 days	
	John McMahon	Labor	Cahill (3)	14 November 1957	1 April 1959	1 year, 138 days	
Minister Assisting the Premier and Treasurer	Pat Hills	Labor	Cahill (4)	1 April 1959	28 October 1959	210 days	
Minister Assisting the Premier	Bill Haigh	Labor	Wran (1) (2)	14 May 1976	29 February 1980	3 years, 291 days	
	Jack Hallam, MLC	Labor	Wran (2)	19 October 1978	29 February 1980	1 year, 133 days	
Minister Assisting the Premier	Peter Anderson	Labor	Wran (7)	6 February 1985	1 January 1986	329 days	
