= Stevens–Bruxner ministry (1932–1935) =

- 46th Cabinet of the State of New South Wales

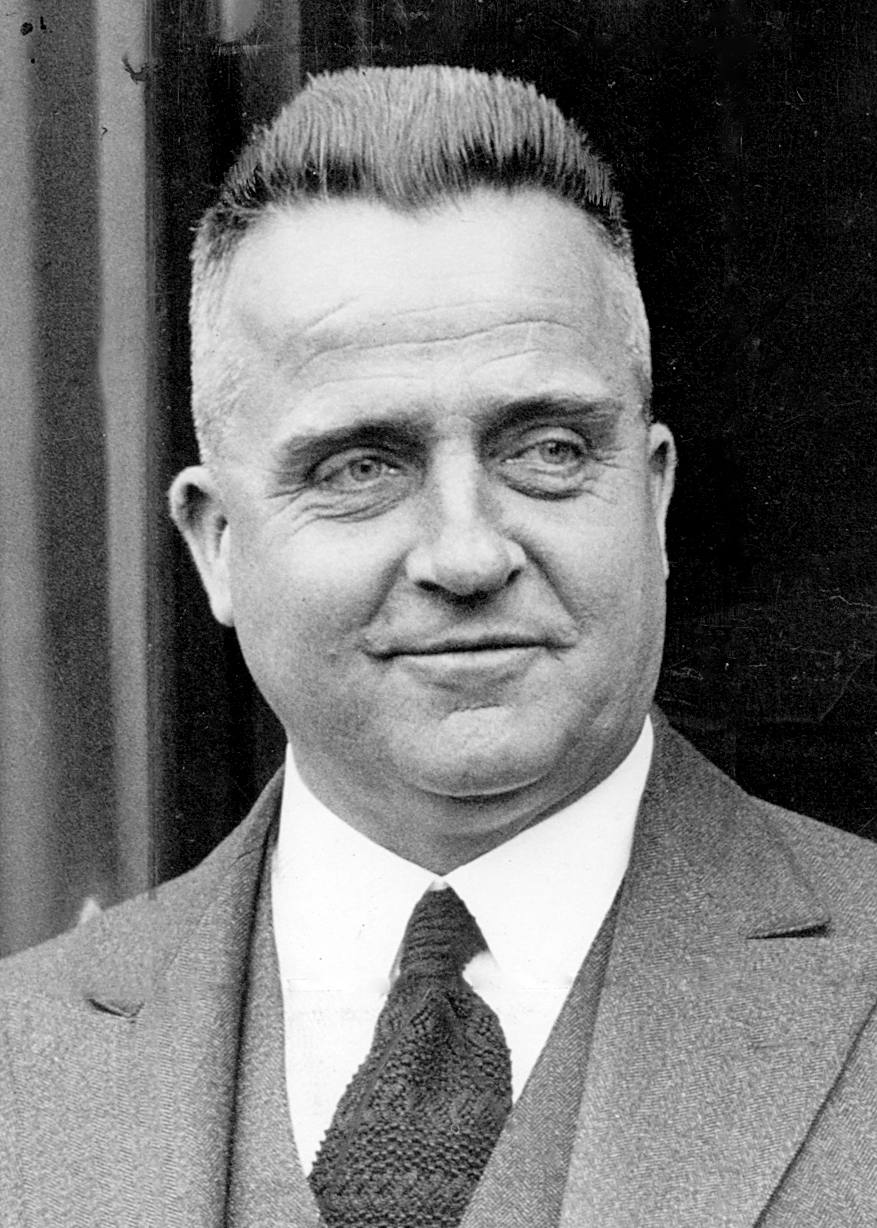
- Premier Bertram Stevens
- Date formed: 13 May 1932
- Date dissolved: 10 February 1935

People and organisations
- Monarch: George V
- Governor: Sir Philip Game; Sir Alexander Hore-Ruthven
- Premier: Bertram Stevens
- Deputy Premier: Michael Bruxner
- No. of ministers: 12
- Member party: UAP–Country Coalition
- Status in legislature: Majority government
- Opposition party: Labor (NSW)
- Opposition leader: Jack Lang

History
- Election: 1932 New South Wales election
- Predecessor: Third Lang ministry
- Successor: Second Stevens-Bruxner ministry

The Stevens–Bruxner ministry (1932–1935) or First Stevens–Bruxner ministry or First Stevens ministry was the 46th ministry of the New South Wales Government, and was led by the 25th Premier, Bertram Stevens, in a United Australia Party coalition with the Country Party, that was led by Lieutenant-Colonel Michael Bruxner, DSO. The ministry was one of three occasions when the Government was led by Stevens, as Premier; and one of four occasions where Bruxner served as Deputy Premier.

Stevens was first elected to the New South Wales Legislative Assembly in 1927 and served continuously until 1940. Having served as a senior minister in the Bavin ministry, following the defeat of the Nationalist coalition led by Bavin, who was in poor health, at the 1930 state election, Stevens was elected leader of the newly formed United Australia Party in New South Wales and became Leader of the Opposition. Bruxner was first elected to the Assembly in 1920 and served continuously until 1962. Initially a member of the Progressive Party, he served as party leader in opposition between 1922 and 1925; and resumed leadership in 1932, following the resignation of his successor, Ernest Buttenshaw. By this stage, the party was renamed as the Country Party.

This ministry covers the period from 13 May 1932 when, as a result of the Lang Dismissal Crisis, the Governor of New South Wales, Philip Game used the reserve power of The Crown to remove Jack Lang as Premier. The ministry served until 10 February 1935 when the 1935 state election saw the Stevens–Bruxner coalition re-elected for a subsequent term.

== Composition of ministry ==
In the first arrangement, lasting just two days, Stevens was the only Member of Government pending formation of the full ministry as a result of the turmoil following the dismissal of Lang and his third ministry. The composition of the ministry was announced by Premier Stevens on 16 May 1932 and covers a period of a little over one month as an "emergency ministry" up until 17 June 1932 when the outcome of the 1932 state election was determined. At that point, a minor reshuffle of the ministry was effected.

| Portfolio | Minister | Party | Term commence | Term end | Term of office |
|---|---|---|---|---|---|
| Premier | Bertram Stevens | United Australia | 13 May 1932 | 10 February 1935 | 2 years, 273 days |
| Sole Executive Councillor | Bertram Stevens | United Australia | 13 May 1932 | 15 May 1932 | 2 days |
| Treasurer | Bertram Stevens | United Australia | 16 May 1932 | 10 February 1935 | 2 years, 270 days |
| Deputy Premier (Note: Portfolio and position of Deputy Premier created for the first time.); Minister for Transport | Michael Bruxner | Country | 16 May 1932 | 10 February 1935 | 2 years, 270 days |
| Minister for Local Government | Michael Bruxner | Country | 16 May 1932 | 17 June 1932 | 32 days |
| Minister for Local Government | Joseph Jackson (Note: Resigned office.) | United Australia | 18 June 1932 | 14 February 1933 | 241 days |
| Minister for Local Government | Eric Spooner | United Australia | 15 February 1933 | 10 February 1935 | 1 year, 360 days |
| Secretary for Public Works; Minister for Health | Reginald Weaver | United Australia | 16 May 1932 | 10 February 1935 | 2 years, 270 days |
| Chief Secretary | Frank Chaffey | United Australia | 16 May 1932 | 10 February 1935 | 2 years, 270 days |
| Secretary for Mines | Frank Chaffey | United Australia | 16 May 1932 | 17 June 1932 | 32 days |
| Secretary for Mines | Roy Vincent | Country | 18 June 1932 | 10 February 1935 | 2 years, 237 days |
| Secretary for Lands | Ernest Buttenshaw | Country | 16 May 1932 | 10 February 1935 | 2 years, 270 days |
| Minister for Education | David Drummond | Country | 16 May 1932 | 10 February 1935 | 2 years, 270 days |
| Attorney General | Sir Daniel Levy | United Australia | 16 May 1932 | 17 June 1932 | 32 days |
| Attorney General | Henry Manning, KC, MLC | United Australia | 18 June 1932 | 10 February 1935 | 2 years, 237 days |
| Minister for Justice | Sir Daniel Levy | United Australia | 16 May 1932 | 17 June 1932 | 32 days |
| Minister for Justice | Lewis Martin | United Australia | 18 June 1932 | 10 February 1935 | 2 years, 237 days |
| Minister for Labour and Industry | John Dunningham | United Australia | 16 May 1932 | 10 February 1935 | 2 years, 270 days |
| Minister for Agriculture | Hugh Main | Country | 16 May 1932 | 10 February 1935 | 2 years, 270 days |
| Minister for Forests | Hugh Main | Country | 16 May 1932 | 17 June 1932 | 32 days |
| Minister for Forests | Roy Vincent | Country | 18 June 1932 | 10 February 1935 | 2 years, 237 days |
| Vice-president of the Executive Council; Representative of the Government in Legislative Council | James Ryan, MLC | United Australia | 16 May 1932 | 17 June 1932 | 32 days |
| Vice-president of the Executive Council; Representative of the Government in Legislative Council | Henry Manning, KC, MLC | United Australia | 18 June 1932 | 10 February 1935 | 2 years, 237 days |
| Assistant Minister in the Legislative Council | James Ryan, MLC | United Australia | 18 June 1932 | 10 February 1935 | 2 years, 237 days |
| Honorary Minister assisting Colonial Treasurer | Eric Spooner | United Australia | 18 June 1932 | 14 February 1933 | 241 days |
| Assistant Treasurer | Eric Spooner | United Australia | 15 February 1933 | 10 February 1935 | 1 year, 360 days |
| Honorary Minister assisting the Minister for Labour and Industry | Herbert Hawkins, MLC | United Australia | 18 June 1932 | 5 January 1933 | 201 days |
| Assistant Colonial Secretary | Herbert Hawkins, MLC | United Australia | 5 January 1933 | 10 February 1935 | 2 years, 36 days |
| Honorary Minister | Herbert FitzSimons | United Australia | 15 February 1933 | 10 February 1935 | 1 year, 360 days |

Ministers are members of the Legislative Assembly unless otherwise noted.

== See also ==
- Second Stevens–Bruxner ministry
- Third Stevens–Bruxner ministry
- Members of the New South Wales Legislative Assembly, 1932-1935
- Members of the New South Wales Legislative Council, 1932-1934
- Members of the New South Wales Legislative Council, 1934-1937

New South Wales government ministries
| Preceded by Third Lang ministry | First Stevens–Bruxner ministry 1932–1935 | Succeeded by Second Stevens-Bruxner ministry |
