= Stevens–Bruxner ministry (1935–1938) =

- 47th Cabinet of the State of New South Wales

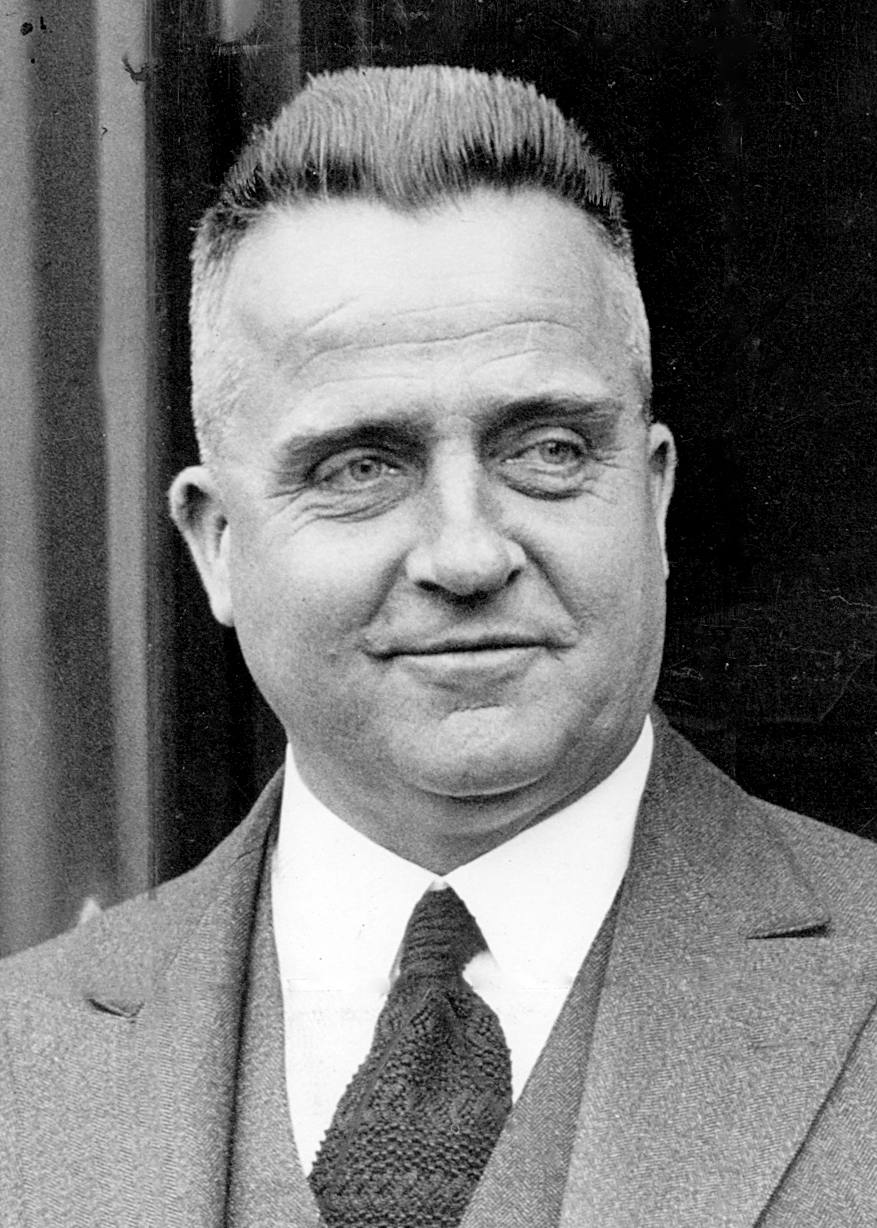
- Premier Bertram Stevens
- Date formed: 11 February 1935
- Date dissolved: 13 April 1938

People and organisations
- Monarch: George V Edward VIII; George V
- Governor: Sir Alexander Hore-Ruthven; Sir David Anderson; The Lord Wakehurst
- Premier: Bertram Stevens
- Deputy Premier: Michael Bruxner
- No. of ministers: 12
- Member party: UAP–Country Coalition
- Status in legislature: Majority government
- Opposition party: Labor (NSW)
- Opposition leader: Jack Lang

History
- Election: 1935 New South Wales election
- Predecessor: First Stevens-Bruxner ministry (1932–1935)
- Successor: Third Stevens–Bruxner ministry (1938–1939)

The Stevens–Bruxner ministry (1935–1938) or Second Stevens–Bruxner ministry or Second Stevens ministry was the 47th ministry of the New South Wales Government, and was led by the 25th Premier, Bertram Stevens, in a United Australia Party coalition with the Country Party, that was led by Michael Bruxner. The ministry was the second one of three occasions when the Government was led by Stevens, as Premier; and second of four occasions where Bruxner served as Deputy Premier.

Stevens was first elected to the New South Wales Legislative Assembly in 1927 and served continuously until 1940. Having served as a senior minister in the Bavin ministry, following the defeat of the Nationalist coalition led by Bavin, who was in poor health, at the 1930 state election, Stevens was elected leader of the newly formed United Australia Party (UAP) in New South Wales and became Leader of the Opposition. Bruxner was first elected to the Assembly in 1920 and served continuously until 1962. Initially a member of the Progressive Party, he served as party leader in opposition between 1922 and 1925; and resumed leadership in 1932, following the resignation of his successor, Ernest Buttenshaw. By this stage, the party was renamed as the Country Party.

The Stevens–Bruxner coalition came to power as a result of the Lang Dismissal Crisis, when the Governor of New South Wales, Philip Game used the reserve power of The Crown to remove Jack Lang as Premier, asking Stevens to form government. Going to the polls a month later, Stevens/Bruxner won a landslide victory at the 1932 state election and were re-elected at the 1935 state election, albeit with a reduced margin. The principal change from the first Stevens–Bruxner ministry was that Reginald Weaver, the Deputy leader of the United Australia Party, was dropped from the ministry, with Stevens describing him as "too extreme in personal independence" and possessing a "needlessly sharp tongue", replaced by the promotion of Herbert FitzSimons. There were five by-elections during the ministry, with the government losing three of them. (Note: The by-elections for Corowa, Woollahra and Vaucluse were won by independents, however Murray Robson (Vaucluse) rejoined the United Australia Party.)

This ministry covers the period from 11 February 1935 until 13 April 1938 when the 1938 state election saw the Stevens–Bruxner coalition re-elected for a subsequent and third term.

== Composition of ministry ==
The composition of the ministry was announced by Premier Stevens on 11 February 1935.

| Portfolio | Minister | Party | Term commence | Term end | Term of office |
|---|---|---|---|---|---|
| Premier; Treasurer | Bertram Stevens (Note: Retained portfolios of Premier and Treasurer from First Stevens–Bruxner ministry.) | United Australia | 10 February 1935 | 13 April 1938 | 3 years, 61 days |
| Secretary for Public Works | Bertram Stevens | United Australia | 10 February 1935 | 21 August 1935 | 191 days |
| Secretary for Public Works | Eric Spooner | United Australia | 22 August 1935 | 13 April 1938 | 2 years, 234 days |
| Deputy Premier; Minister for Transport | Michael Bruxner (Note: Retained portfolios from First Stevens–Bruxner ministry.) | Country | 10 February 1935 | 13 April 1938 | 3 years, 61 days |
| Attorney–General; Vice-president of the Executive Council; Representative of the Government in Legislative Council | Henry Manning, KC, MLC | United Australia | 10 February 1935 | 13 April 1938 | 3 years, 61 days |
| Secretary for Lands | Ernest Buttenshaw (Note: Resigned.) | Country | 10 February 1935 | 31 January 1938 | 2 years, 354 days |
| Secretary for Lands | Colin Sinclair | Country | 1 February 1938 | 13 April 1938 | 71 days |
| Chief Secretary | Frank Chaffey | United Australia | 10 February 1935 | 13 April 1938 | 3 years, 61 days |
| Minister for Education | David Drummond | Country | 10 February 1935 | 13 April 1938 | 3 years, 61 days |
| Minister for Labour and Industry | John Dunningham | United Australia | 10 February 1935 | 13 April 1938 | 3 years, 61 days |
| Minister for Agriculture | Hugh Main | Country | 10 February 1935 | 1 April 1938 | 3 years, 49 days |
| Minister for Agriculture | Roy Vincent (Note: Retained portfolios of Secretary for Mines and Minister for Forests from First Stevens–Bruxner ministry.) | Country | 2 April 1938 | 13 April 1938 | 11 days |
| Secretary for Mines; Minister for Forests | Roy Vincent | Country | 10 February 1935 | 13 April 1938 | 3 years, 61 days |
| Minister for Local Government | Eric Spooner | United Australia | 10 February 1935 | 13 April 1938 | 3 years, 61 days |
| Assistant Treasurer | Eric Spooner | United Australia | 10 February 1935 | 21 August 1935 | 191 days |
| Minister for Justice | Lewis Martin | United Australia | 10 February 1935 | 13 April 1938 | 2 years, 234 days |
| Minister for Health | Herbert FitzSimons | United Australia | 10 February 1935 | 13 April 1938 | 2 years, 234 days |
| Assistant Minister in the Legislative Council | James Ryan, MLC | United Australia | 10 February 1935 | 13 April 1938 | 2 years, 234 days |
| Assistant Colonial Secretary | Herbert Hawkins, MLC (Note: Retained portfolio of Assistant Colonial Secretary from First Stevens–Bruxner ministry.) | United Australia | 10 February 1935 | 21 August 1935 | 191 days |
| Minister for Social Services | Herbert Hawkins, MLC | United Australia | 22 August 1935 | 13 April 1938 | 2 years, 234 days |
| Honorary Minister | James Shand | United Australia | 22 August 1935 | 13 April 1938 | 2 years, 234 days |
| Minister without portfolio | George Gollan | United Australia | 2 April 1937 | 13 April 1938 | 1 year, 11 days |
| Minister without portfolio | Colin Sinclair | Country | 29 June 1937 | 31 January 1938 | 216 days |

Ministers are members of the Legislative Assembly unless otherwise noted.

== See also ==
- First Stevens–Bruxner ministry
- Third Stevens–Bruxner ministry
- Members of the New South Wales Legislative Assembly, 1935-1938
- Members of the New South Wales Legislative Council, 1934-1937
- Members of the New South Wales Legislative Council, 1937-1940

New South Wales government ministries
| Preceded by First Stevens-Bruxner ministry | Second Stevens–Bruxner ministry 1935–1938 | Succeeded by Third Stevens–Bruxner ministry |
