= Stevens–Bruxner ministry (1938–39) =

- 48th Cabinet of the State of New South Wales

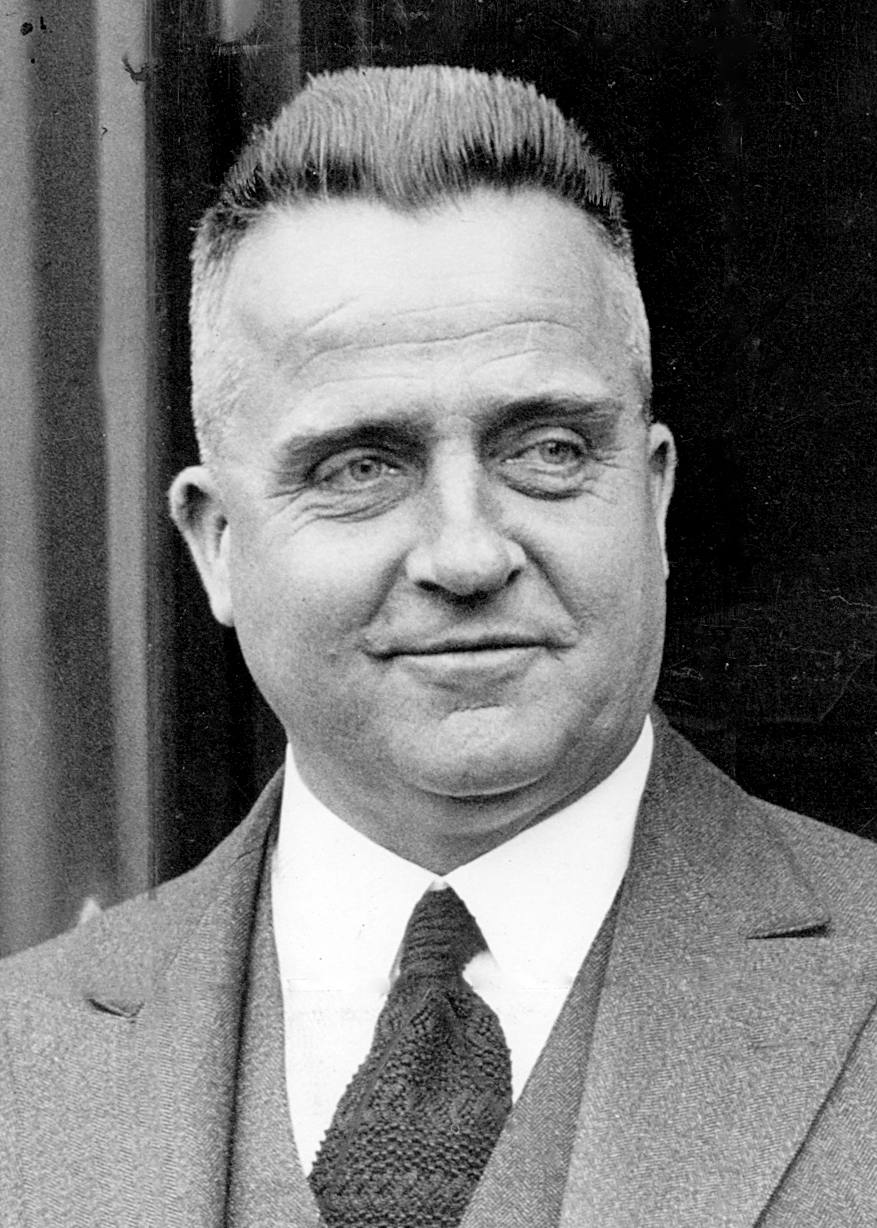
- Premier Bertram Stevens
- Date formed: 13 April 1938
- Date dissolved: 5 August 1939

People and organisations
- Monarch: George VI
- Governor: The Lord Wakehurst
- Premier: Bertram Stevens
- Deputy Premier: Michael Bruxner
- No. of ministers: 12
- Member party: UAP–Country Coalition
- Status in legislature: Majority government
- Opposition party: Labor (NSW)
- Opposition leader: Jack Lang

History
- Election: 1938 New South Wales election
- Predecessor: Second Stevens-Bruxner ministry
- Successor: Mair–Bruxner ministry

The Stevens–Bruxner ministry (1938–1939) or Third Stevens–Bruxner ministry or Third Stevens ministry was the 48th ministry of the New South Wales Government, and was led by the 25th Premier, Bertram Stevens, in a United Australia Party coalition with the Country Party, that was led by Michael Bruxner. The ministry was the third of three occasions when the Government was led by Stevens, as Premier; and third of four occasions where Bruxner served as Deputy Premier.

Stevens was first elected to the New South Wales Legislative Assembly in 1927 and served continuously until 1940. Having served as a senior minister in the Bavin ministry, following the defeat of the Nationalist coalition led by Bavin, who was in poor health, at the 1930 state election, Stevens was elected leader of the newly formed United Australia Party in New South Wales and became Leader of the Opposition. Bruxner was first elected to the Assembly in 1920 and served continuously until 1962. Initially a member of the Progressive Party, he served as party leader in opposition between 1922 and 1925; and resumed leadership in 1932, following the resignation of his successor, Ernest Buttenshaw. By this stage, the party was renamed as the Country Party.

The Stevens–Bruxner coalition came to power as a result of the Lang Dismissal Crisis, when the Governor of New South Wales, Philip Game used the reserve power of The Crown to remove Jack Lang as Premier, asking Stevens to form government. Going to the polls a month later, Stevens/Bruxner won a landslide victory at the 1932 election and were re-elected at the 1935 and 1938 elections, albeit with reduced margins. There had been six by-elections during the ministry, with Industrial Labor picking up two seats from the government. (Note: The by-elections for Hurstville and Waverley were won by Industrial Labor.)

This ministry covers the period from 13 April 1938 until 5 August 1939. On 21 July 1939 Eric Spooner, the deputy leader of the United Australia Party, resigned from cabinet. Spooner had been a protege of Stevens, however their relationship deteriorated, particularly in relation to the Country Party. On 1 August 1939 Spooner moved a motion that was critical of Stevens, describing him as running the party as a dictatorship, and the proposal to cut government spending in order to restrain a growing deficit. Stevens stated that he regarded it as a motion of censure. The coalition had a large majority in the assembly, however the motion was passed 43 to 41, with nine United Australia members joining Spooner in voting against the government. (Note: The United Australia members who voted against the government were Charles Bennett (Gloucester), Frank Chaffey (Tamworth), John Lee (Drummoyne), Stan Lloyd (Concord), Murray Robson (Vaucluse), James Ross (Kogarah), Edward Sanders (Willoughby), James Shand (Hornsby), Eric Spooner (Ryde) and Bruce Walker Jr (Hawkesbury).) Having lost the confidence of the assembly, Stevens resigned as Premier and leader of the party. Spooner had ambitions to replace Stevens as leader however Bruxner refused to join a coalition with him and Alexander Mair succeeded Stevens as Premier.

== Composition of ministry ==
The composition of the ministry was announced by Premier Stevens on 13 April 1938.

Portfolio	Minister	Party	Term commence	Term end	Term of office
Premier	Bertram Stevens (Note: Retained portfolios from Second Stevens–Bruxner ministry.)	United Australia	13 April 1938	5 August 1939	1 year, 114 days
Treasurer	Bertram Stevens	United Australia	13 April 1938	13 October 1938	183 days
Treasurer	Alexander Mair	United Australia	13 October 1938	5 August 1939	296 days
Deputy Premier; Minister for Transport	Michael Bruxner	Country	13 April 1938	5 August 1939	1 year, 114 days
Attorney–General; Vice-president of the Executive Council; Representative of the Government in Legislative Council	Henry Manning, KC, MLC	United Australia	13 April 1938	5 August 1939	1 year, 114 days
Secretary for Public Works; Minister for Local Government	Eric Spooner (Note: Eric Spooner, Deputy Leader of the United Australia Party, resigned in protest against Bertram Stevens and the failure to have a balanced budget. Spooner went on to move a censure motion against Stevens, that resulted in Stevens resigning as Premier.)	United Australia	13 April 1938	21 July 1939	1 year, 99 days
Secretary for Public Works; Minister for Local Government	Bertram Stevens	United Australia	21 July 1939	5 August 1939	15 days
Minister of Education	David Drummond	Country	13 April 1938	5 August 1939	1 year, 114 days
Minister for Labour and Industry	John Dunningham (Note: Died in office.)	United Australia	13 April 1938	26 May 1938	43 days
Minister for Labour and Industry	Alexander Mair	United Australia	1 June 1938	13 October 1938	134 days
Minister for Labour and Industry	Herbert Hawkins, MLC	United Australia	13 October 1938	16 June 1939	246 days
Minister for Labour and Industry	Athol Richardson	United Australia	26 June 1939	5 August 1939	40 days
Minister for Justice	Lewis Martin	United Australia	13 April 1938	5 August 1939	1 year, 114 days
Minister for Health	Herbert FitzSimons	United Australia	13 April 1938	5 August 1939	1 year, 114 days
Minister for Social Services	Herbert Hawkins, MLC	United Australia	13 April 1938	13 October 1938	183 days
Minister for Social Services	Athol Richardson	United Australia	13 October 1938	5 August 1939	296 days
Chief Secretary	George Gollan	United Australia	13 April 1938	5 August 1939	1 year, 114 days
Minister for Lands	Colin Sinclair	Country	13 April 1938	5 August 1939	1 year, 114 days
Minister for Agriculture	Albert Reid	Country	13 April 1938	5 August 1939	1 year, 114 days
Secretary for Mines; Minister for Forests	Roy Vincent	Country	13 April 1938	5 August 1939	1 year, 114 days
Assistant Minister	Alexander Mair	United Australia	13 April 1938	1 June 1938	49 days
Honorary Minister	Athol Richardson	United Australia	13 April 1938	13 October 1938	183 days
Member of the Executive Council; Assistant Minister for Health	Hubert Primrose	United Australia	26 June 1939	5 August 1939	40 days
Member of the Executive Council; Assistant Minister	Marsden Manfred, MLC	United Australia	26 June 1939	5 August 1939	40 days

Ministers are members of the Legislative Assembly unless otherwise noted.

== See also ==
- First Stevens–Bruxner ministry
- Second Stevens–Bruxner ministry
- Members of the New South Wales Legislative Assembly, 1938-1941
- Members of the New South Wales Legislative Council, 1937-1940

New South Wales government ministries
Preceded by Second Stevens-Bruxner ministry	Third Stevens–Bruxner ministry 1938–1939	Succeeded by Mair–Bruxner ministry
