= Mair–Bruxner ministry =

- 49th Cabinet of the State of New South Wales

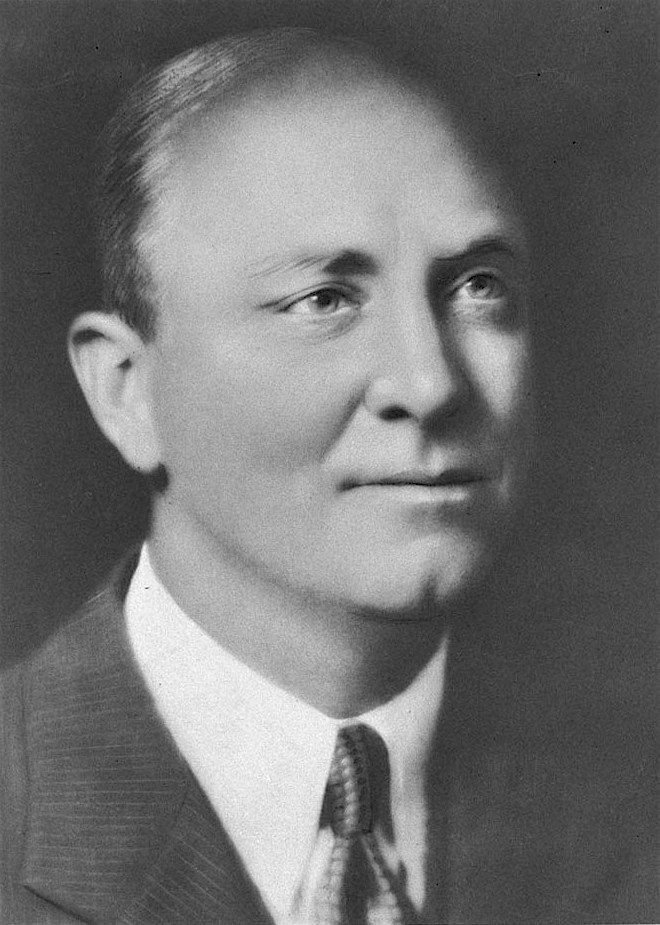
- Premier Alexander Mair
- Date formed: 5 August 1939
- Date dissolved: 16 May 1941

People and organisations
- Monarch: George VI
- Governor: The Lord Wakehurst
- Premier: Alexander Mair
- Deputy Premier: Michael Bruxner
- No. of ministers: 12
- Member party: UAP–Country Coalition
- Status in legislature: Majority government
- Opposition party: Labor
- Opposition leader: Jack Lang/William McKell

History
- Election: 1938 New South Wales election
- Outgoing election: 1941 New South Wales election
- Predecessor: Third Stevens-Bruxner ministry
- Successor: First McKell Ministry

The Mair–Bruxner ministry or Mair ministry was the 49th ministry of the New South Wales Government, and was led by the 26th Premier, Alexander Mair, in a United Australia Party coalition with the Country Party, that was led by Michael Bruxner. The ministry was the only occasion when the Government was led by Mair, as Premier; and fourth and final occasion where Bruxner served as Deputy Premier.

Mair was first elected to the New South Wales Legislative Assembly in 1932 and served continuously until 1946. Having served as a junior minister in the third Stevens ministry and subsequently promoted, Stevens had resigned as Premier following the passing of a censure motion concerning Mair's proposal to cut government spending in order to restrain a growing deficit, with ten United Australia members crossing the floor to vote against the government. Eric Spooner had ambitions to replace Stevens as leader however Bruxner refused to join a coalition with him and Mair won the leadership ballot and hence became Premier. Bruxner was first elected to the Assembly in 1920 and served continuously until 1962. Initially a member of the Progressive Party, he served as party leader in opposition between 1922 and 1925; and resumed leadership in 1932, following the resignation of his successor, Ernest Buttenshaw. By this stage, the party was renamed as the Country Party.

This ministry covers the period from 5 August 1939 until 16 May 1941, when the 1941 state election saw the defeat of the Mair–Bruxner coalition, and the Labor Party winning government under the leadership of William McKell.

== Composition of ministry ==
The composition of the ministry was announced by Premier Mair on 5 August 1939 for eleven days until 16 August 1939 as an "emergency cabinet" pending formation of the full ministry as a result of the turmoil following the resignation of Stevens. At that point there was a minor rearrangement.

Portfolio	Minister	Party	Term commence	Term end	Term of office
Premier	Alexander Mair	United Australia	5 August 1939	16 May 1941	1 year, 284 days
Treasurer	Alexander Mair	United Australia	5 August 1939	16 August 1939	11 days
Treasurer	Athol Richardson	United Australia	16 August 1939	16 May 1941	1 year, 273 days
Secretary for Public Works; Minister for Local Government	Alexander Mair	United Australia	5 August 1939	16 May 1941	1 year, 284 days
Secretary for Public Works; Minister for Local Government	Lewis Martin	United Australia	16 August 1939	16 May 1941	1 year, 273 days
Deputy Premier; Minister for Transport	Michael Bruxner (Note: Retained portfolios from Third Stevens–Bruxner ministry.)	Country	5 August 1939	16 May 1941	1 year, 284 days
Attorney–General; Vice-president of the Executive Council; Representative of the Government in Legislative Council	Henry Manning, KC, MLC	United Australia	5 August 1939	16 May 1941	1 year, 284 days
Minister for Education	David Drummond	Country	5 August 1939	16 May 1941	1 year, 284 days
Secretary for Mines; Minister for Forests	Roy Vincent	Country	5 August 1939	16 May 1941	1 year, 284 days
Minister for Justice	Lewis Martin	United Australia	5 August 1939	16 August 1939	11 days
Minister for Justice	Vernon Treatt	United Australia	16 August 1939	16 May 1941	1 year, 273 days
Chief Secretary	George Gollan	United Australia	5 August 1939	16 August 1939	11 days
Chief Secretary	Alwyn Tonking	United Australia	16 August 1939	16 May 1941	1 year, 273 days
Minister for Lands	Colin Sinclair (Note: Resigned.)	Country	5 August 1939	6 November 1940	1 year, 93 days
Minister for Lands	Alfred Yeo	Country	6 November 1940	16 May 1941	191 days
Minister for Agriculture	Albert Reid	Country	5 August 1939	16 May 1941	1 year, 284 days
Minister for Labour and Industry and Minister for Social Services	Athol Richardson	United Australia	5 August 1939	16 August 1939	11 days
Minister for Labour and Industry and Minister for Social Services	George Gollan	United Australia	16 August 1939	16 May 1941	1 year, 273 days
Minister for Health	Hubert Primrose	United Australia	5 August 1939	5 September 1939	31 days
Minister for Health	Herbert FitzSimons	United Australia	5 September 1939	16 May 1941	1 year, 253 days
Assistant Minister	Marsden Manfred, MLC	United Australia	5 August 1939	16 May 1941	1 year, 284 days
Assistant Minister	Hubert Primrose	United Australia	5 September 1939	16 May 1941	1 year, 253 days

Ministers are members of the Legislative Assembly unless otherwise noted.

== See also ==
- Members of the New South Wales Legislative Assembly, 1938-1941
- Members of the New South Wales Legislative Council, 1937-1940
- Members of the New South Wales Legislative Council, 1940-1943

New South Wales government ministries
Preceded by Third Stevens–Bruxner ministry	Mair–Bruxner ministry 1939–1941	Succeeded by First McKell Ministry
