= Davoren =

Davoren may refer to:

- Iarfhlaith Davoren (born 1986), Irish footballer
- John Davoren (1915–1997), American politician
- John Davoren (Australian politician) (1866–1941)
- Mark Davoren, Irish Gaelic footballer
- Wes Davoren (1928–2010), Australian politician

== See also ==
- Davoren Park, South Australia, suburb of Adelaide
- Ó Duibh dá Bhoireann, Irish surname
