= Kirkness =

Kirkness may refer to:

- Kirkness, Edmonton, a neighbourhood in Edmonton, Canada
- Geoffrey Kirkness, British actor
- William Kirkness (1862–1944), Australian politician
- Verna Kirkness (born 1935), Canadian academic

== See also ==
- William Douglas of Kirkness, British officer and politician
