= Samuel James Smith =

Australian politician

Samuel James Smith (24 July 1897 – 8 July 1964) was an Australian politician.

He was born at Pyrmont, the son of Samuel Smith. He worked as a busdriver, and in 1925 became assistant secretary of the Federated Clerks' Union . On 27 October 1928 he married Jessie May Robertson, with whom he had two children. From 1931 to 1940 he was a Labor member of the New South Wales Legislative Council. Smith died at Erskineville in 1964.
