= John Joseph O'Reilly =

Australian politician

John Joseph O'Reilly (21 October 1888 – 13 May 1933) was an Australian politician.

He was born at Mount Egerton in Victoria to miner James Stephen O'Reilly and Maria Ryan. He was a smelter miner at Port Pirie, and was blacklisted after his involvement in a 1909 lockout. He went to Broken Hill, where he worked under false names and became active in the Miners' Union. On 24 March 1913 he married Theresa Ellen Giffney, with whom he had four children. He was active in the anti-conscription campaign for the 1916 conscription referendum and was on the 1917 strike committee; he also worked on the staff of the Labor Daily from 1924, having moved to Newcastle. By this time he had moved to the Federated Clerks' Union. From 1931 to 1933 he was a Labor member of the New South Wales Legislative Council; he died at Newcastle in 1933.
