= Bertram Stevens (politician) =

Australian politician (1889–1973)

The Honourable Sir Bertram Stevens KCMG
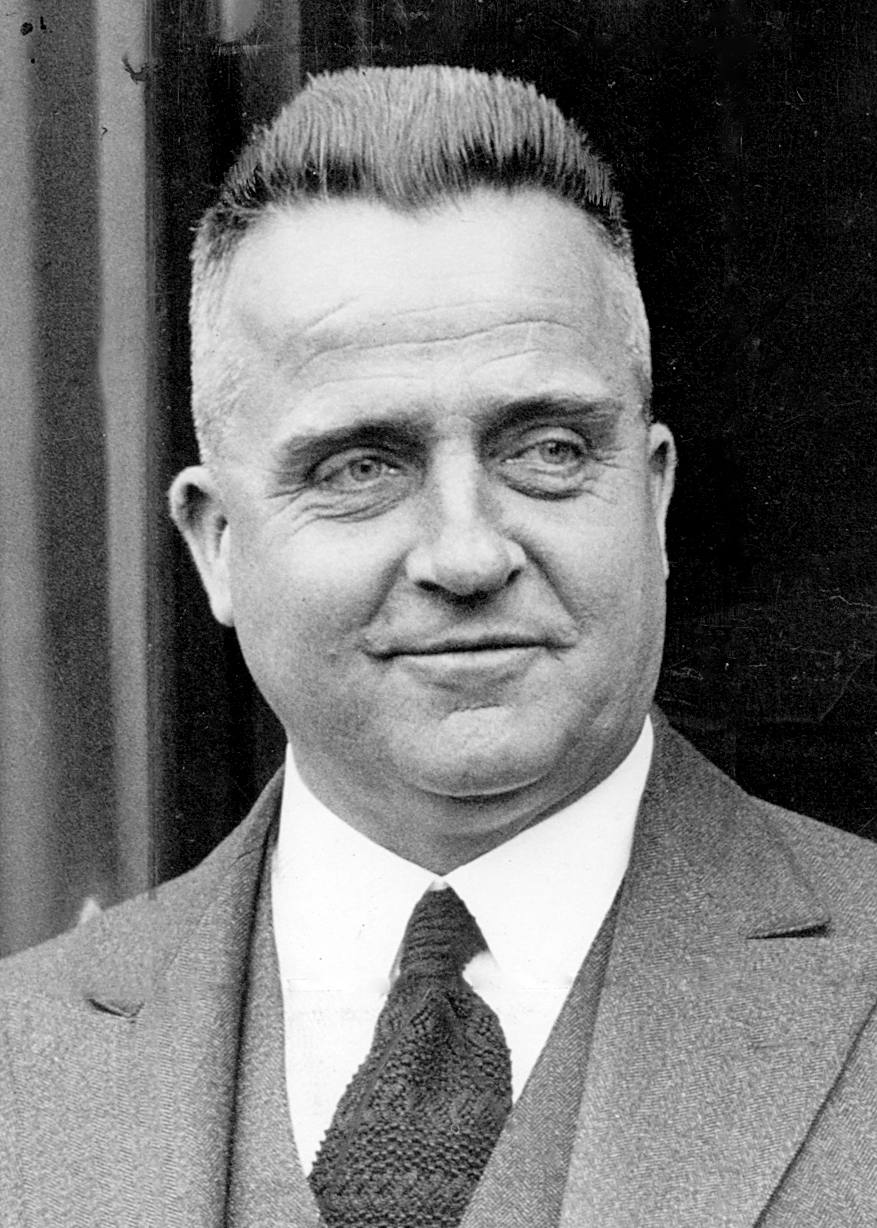
- Stevens c. 1939

25th Premier of New South Wales
- In office 16 May 1932 – 5 August 1939
- Monarchs: George VI; Edward VIII; George V
- Governor: The Lord Wakehurst; Sir David Anderson; The Lord Gowrie; Sir Philip Game
- Deputy: Michael Bruxner
- Preceded by: Jack Lang
- Succeeded by: Alexander Mair

13th Leader of the Opposition in New South Wales
- In office 5 April – 13 May 1932
- Monarch: George V
- Governor: Philip Game
- Deputy: Reginald Weaver
- Preceded by: Thomas Bavin
- Succeeded by: Jack Lang

Leader of the United Australia Party in New South Wales
- In office 6 April 1932 – 5 August 1939
- Deputy: Eric Spooner; Reginald Weaver; None (until 27 April)
- Preceded by: Thomas Bavin
- Succeeded by: Alexander Mair

Deputy Leader of the Opposition in New South Wales
- In office 18 February 1931 – 5 April 1932
- Leader: Thomas Bavin
- Preceded by: Richard Ball
Cabinet Positions
Minister for Local Government
In office 21 July – 5 August 1939
Preceded by	Eric Spooner
Succeeded by	Alexander Mair
Secretary for Public Works
In office 21 July – 5 August 1939
Preceded by	Eric Spooner
Succeeded by	Alexander Mair
In office 10 February – 21 August 1935
Preceded by	Reginald Weaver
Succeeded by	Eric Spooner
41st Treasurer of New South Wales (Note: Similar to the position of Assistant Treasurer, full title of the cabinet position was: “Colonial Treasurer”.)
In office 16 May 1932 – 13 October 1938
Preceded by	Jack Lang
Succeeded by	Alexander Mair
In office 16 April 1929 – 3 November 1930
Premier	Thomas Bavin
Preceded by	Thomas Bavin
Succeeded by	Jack Lang
Assistant Treasurer (Note: The full title of the cabinet position was: “Assistant Colonial Treasurer”.)
In office 18 October 1927 – 15 April 1929
Premier	Thomas Bavin
Minister	Thomas Bavin
Preceded by	Robert Cruickshank
Succeeded by	Eric Spooner (Note: The Assistant Treasurer cabinet position was not filled again until 1933; the title was officially changed to: “Assistant Treasurer”.)
Electorate
Member of the New South Wales Legislative Assembly for Croydon
In office 7 September 1927 – 12 August 1940
Preceded by	Electorate established
Succeeded by	David Hunter
Department Positions
8th Director of Finance (Note: During his tenure as Director of Finance, the title of “Director of Finance” had changed to “Under Secretary and Director of the Treasury”.)
In office 22 November 1924 – 12 July 1925
Minister Responsible	Arthur Cocks; George Fuller; Jack Lang
Preceded by	John Spence
Succeeded by	Clarence Radford Chapman

Personal details
- Born: 2 January 1889 Redfern, Colony of New South Wales
- Died: 24 March 1973 (aged 84) Concord West, New South Wales, Australia
- Resting place: Pine Grove Memorial Park, Minchinbury
- Party: United Australia (after 1932); Nationalist (until 1932)
- Spouse: Edith Lillie Anderson (m. 1914)
- Education: Fort Street School

Sir Bertram Sydney Barnsdale Stevens KCMG (2 January 1889 – 24 March 1973), also referred to as B. S. B. Stevens, was an Australian politician who served as the 25th Premier of New South Wales, in office from 1932 to 1939 as leader of the United Australia Party (UAP).

Stevens grew up in Sydney and was an accountant and public servant before entering politics. He was elected to the New South Wales Legislative Assembly at the 1927 state election, as a member of the Nationalist Party. In 1929, he was appointed state treasurer under Thomas Bavin, serving until his party lost the 1930 election. In 1932, Stevens was elected as the inaugural leader of the state branch of the UAP. He became premier later that year, following the dismissal of Labor's Jack Lang, and subsequently led his party to victory at the 1932, 1935, and 1938 elections. Stevens was ousted in 1939 and replaced by Alexander Mair. He made an abortive attempt to enter federal politics at the 1940 election, and thereafter played little part in public life.

== Early life ==
Stevens was born on 2 January 1889 in Redfern, Sydney, New South Wales. He was the seventh surviving child of Sarah (née Barnsdale) and John Stevens; his father worked as a carpenter. Stevens attended the Fort Street Model School, leaving in 1905 to work as a clerk for the Sydney Municipal Council. As a young man he served as a Methodist lay preacher; he kept teetotal and did not smoke. After training as an accountant, Stevens was appointed deputy town clerk of Manly in 1908, and then in 1912 became a clerk in the Department of Local Government. He married Edith Lillie Anderson on 18 April 1914, with whom he had three children. By 1920, Stevens was working as an inspector for the Public Service Board. He was appointed under-secretary and director of finance at the New South Wales Treasury in 1924. However, he soon came into conflict with Premier Jack Lang and resigned his position the following year. His resignation made him a public figure, and in 1927 he was elected to the Marrickville Council.

== Political career ==
In 1927 Stevens entered the Legislative Assembly, as member for the Sydney suburban electoral district of Croydon. During the Nationalist Party Premiership of Sir Thomas Bavin, Stevens served first as Assistant Treasurer, and from 1929 as Treasurer. Not long after the Great Depression ended Bavin's administration in 1930, Stevens became Deputy Leader of the Opposition. In 1932 the Nationalist Party was absorbed into the United Australia Party, and Stevens became that party's state parliamentary leader.

=== Premier of New South Wales ===
In May 1932 the Governor, Sir Philip Game, citing the reserve powers of The Crown, dismissed the government of the Labor Premier, Jack Lang, which was in dispute with Australia's federal government of James Scullin. Game appointed Stevens as caretaker Premier. Stevens immediately called a state election, which his party won in a commanding landslide.

His major reform was the replacement of the appointed Legislative Council, by a Council elected by the whole parliament to terms equivalent to four Assembly terms, that is up to 12 years; this was passed by referendum in 1933. He reduced the protections for mortgagors and tenants that had been introduced by Lang's 1925–1927 government. The UAP was re-elected (by somewhat reduced majorities) in 1935 and 1938, each time against the Lang-led Labor Party. For most of Stevens's seven-year Premiership, one of the longest in New South Wales history – it continued until the eve of World War II – he was his own Treasurer.

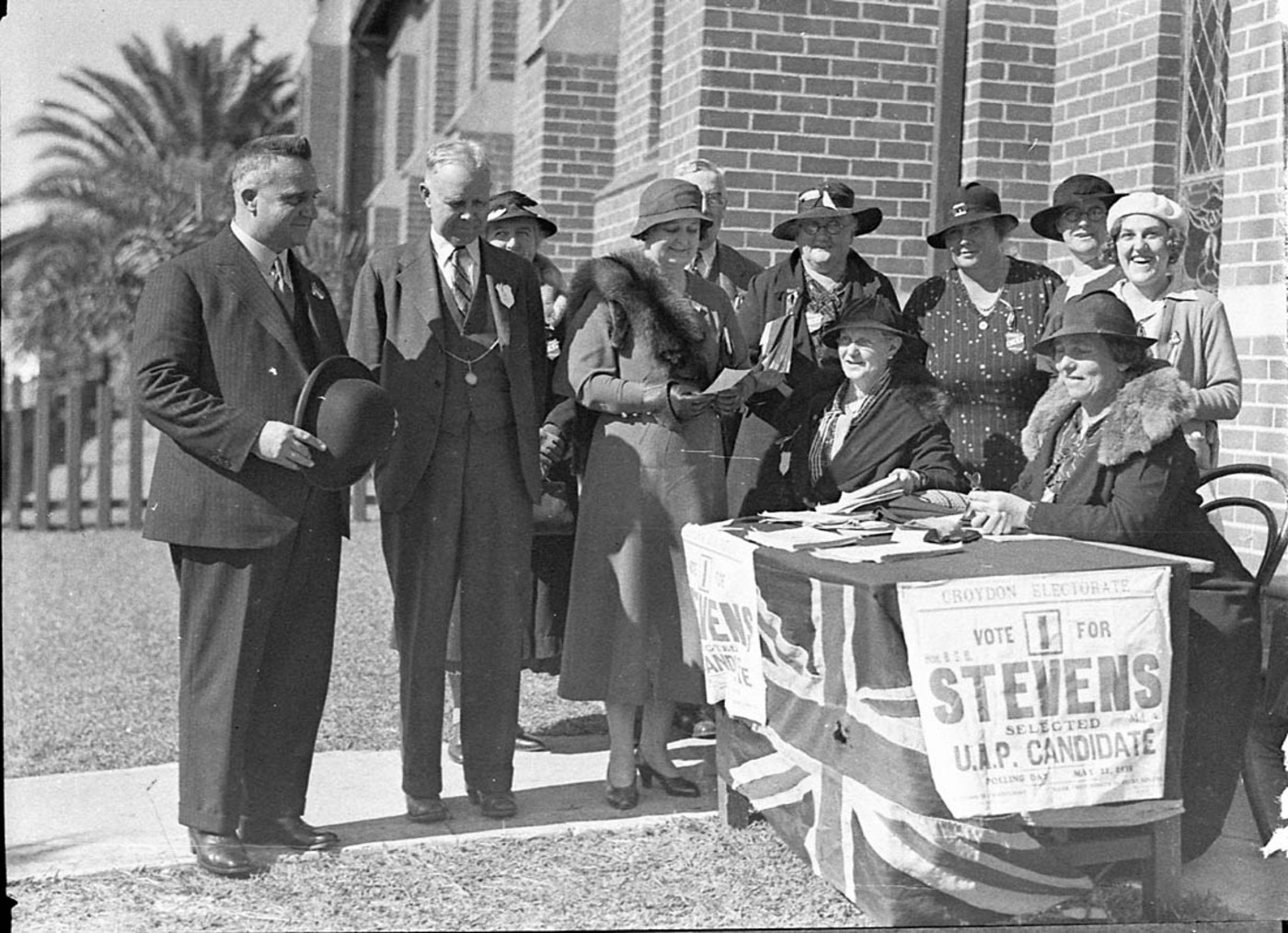
Premier Bertram Stevens (left) at a polling place in Croydon on 13 May 1935.

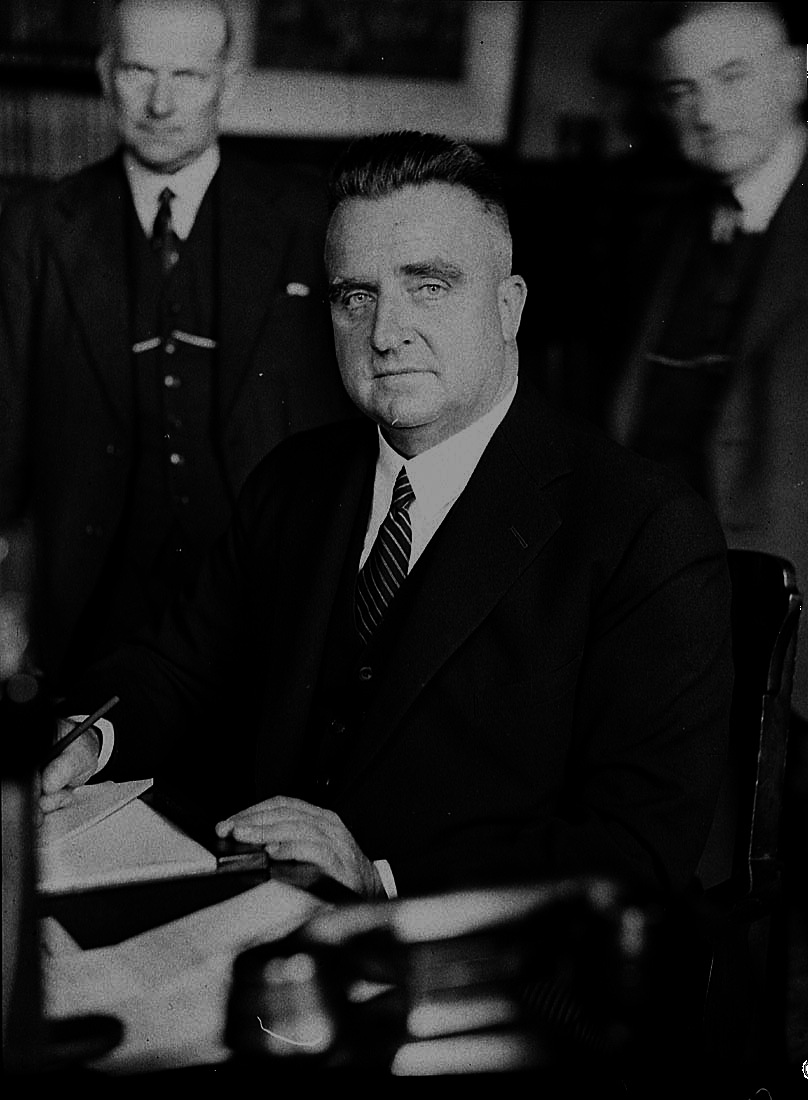
Stevens with members of his cabinet in 1939.

Stevens disliked the restrictive aspects of the Premiers' Plan, and was seen as overly parochial in his dealings with other states and the federal government. In a November 1932 letter to Stanley Bruce, Prime Minister Joseph Lyons wrote "We have got rid of Lang but unfortunately we now have a Stevens to contend with. At least one could go out and attack Lang in the open. In the case of Stevens, however, one is continually sabotaged from behind."

Although Stevens's dealings with Country Party leader and Deputy Premier Michael Bruxner were friendly, the same was not true of his working relationship with his own party's deputy leaders. In 1935 Stevens dropped Deputy leader Reginald Weaver from the ministry, describing him as "too extreme in personal independence" and possessing a "needlessly sharp tongue", Weaver was replaced as deputy by Eric Spooner. Spooner was critical of Stevens' relationship with the Country Party and in 1938 he was passed over as Treasurer. In July 1939, Spooner resigned from cabinet and on 1 August moved a motion that was critical of the proposal to cut government spending in order to restrain a growing deficit, with Spooner personally attacking Stevens, describing him as running the party as a dictatorship. The coalition had a large majority in the assembly, however the motion was passed 43 to 41, with nine other UAP members joining Spooner in voting against the government. Having lost the confidence of the assembly, Stevens resigned as UAP leader and premier. Spooner's ambitions to replace Stevens as leader were thwarted as Bruxner made it clear that he and the Country Party would not serve under him. Treasurer Alexander Mair succeeded Stevens as Premier.

Stevens was supportive of the Australian film industry and introduced the Film Quota Act.

=== Federal politics ===
Still only 50 years old when he lost the premiership, Stevens had long had hopes of a career in the federal parliament. Prime Minister Joseph Lyons had no clear successor, and within New South Wales many thought Stevens would be a suitable replacement; he had little support in other states, however. Despite Robert Menzies's attempts to discourage him, he abandoned his Assembly seat in 1940 and ran for the Labor-controlled Division of Lang (Note: Named after former politician and clergyman John Dunmore Lang not Stevens's opponent Jack Lang.) during that year's federal election. He was easily defeated by the ALP incumbent, Dan Mulcahy.

== Croydon residence ==
Stevens lived at 15 Malvern Avenue, Croydon, New South Wales for around 25 years. He lived there whilst Premier of NSW (1932–1939). He also briefly resided at 'Hillcrest' at 26 Malvern Avenue.

== Later life ==
In 1941 and 1942, Stevens served as the Australian representative to the Eastern Group Supply Council in New Delhi. After the war, Stevens was president of the India League of Australia, and wrote prolifically upon Indian politics; but he never again held, or sought, elective office. He died in the Sydney suburb of Concord West, poor as a result of a long public service career and almost forgotten, survived by a son and two daughters. Stevens was accorded a state funeral and buried beside his wife who pre-deceased him in 1966 at Pine Grove Memorial Park, Minchinbury, New South Wales.

== Honours ==
- Stevens was made a Knight Commander of the Order of St Michael and St George in 1941.
- Sir Bertram Stevens Drive, a main access road through Royal National Park, a protected national park in Sutherland Shire, NSW.

== See also ==
- First Stevens–Bruxner ministry
- Second Stevens–Bruxner ministry
- Third Stevens–Bruxner ministry

Government offices
Preceded by John Spence	Director of Finance; 1924 – 1925	Succeeded by Himself as Under Secretary and Director
Preceded by Himself as Director of Finance	Under Secretary and Director of The Treasury; 1925	Succeeded by Clarence Chapman as Under Secretary of The Treasury
New South Wales Legislative Assembly
New district	Member for Croydon; 1927 – 1940	Succeeded by David Hunter
Political offices
Preceded by Robert Cruickshank	Assistant Treasurer; 1927 – 1929	Vacant Title next held by Eric Spooner
Preceded by Thomas Bavin	Treasurer of New South Wales; 1929 – 1930	Succeeded by Jack Lang
Preceded by Thomas Bavin	Leader of the Opposition of New South Wales; 1932	Succeeded by Jack Lang
Preceded by Jack Lang	Premier of New South Wales; 1932 – 1939	Succeeded by Alexander Mair
Preceded by Jack Lang	Treasurer of New South Wales; 1932 – 1938	Succeeded by Alexander Mair
Preceded by Reginald Weaver	Secretary for Public Works; 1935	Succeeded by Eric Spooner
Preceded by Eric Spooner	Secretary for Public Works; 1939	Succeeded by Alexander Mair
Preceded by Eric Spooner	Minister for Local Government; 1939	Succeeded by Alexander Mair
Party political offices
Preceded by Thomas Bavin	Leader of the United Australia Party; 1932 – 1939	Succeeded by Alexander Mair
