= Thomas Gordon (Australian politician) =

Australian politician

Sir Thomas Stewart Gordon (26 April 1882 – 5 July 1949) was an Australian politician.

He was born in Ardrossan in South Australia to grazier William Gordon and Alice Wicks. He was a businessman who settled in Sydney in 1903, where he worked for Birt and Company. In 1909 he married Victoria Fisher, with whom he had three daughters. He spent three years in Wellington in New Zealand before becoming a shipping manager. He held a variety of other company positions and directorships, and as also a Mosman alderman from 1925 to 1928. From 1932 to 1934 he was a United Australia Party member of the New South Wales Legislative Council. He was knighted in 1938. Gordon died in Point Piper in 1949.
