= Harold Sprent Nicholas =

Australian politician

the Honourable Chief Justice Harold Sprent Nicholas MLC

Chief Judge in Equity of the Supreme Court of New South Wales
- In office 1939–1948

Judge of the Supreme Court of New South Wales
- In office 1935–1948

Legislative Council of New South Wales
- In office 1932–1935

Personal details
- Born: 8 January 1877
- Died: 11 June 1953 (aged 76)
- Party: United Australia Party
- Education: Corpus Christi College, Oxford
- Profession: Politician, judge, lawyer, journalist

== Early life ==
Harold Sprent Nicholas (1877–1953) was an Australian judge, journalist and politician. He was born in Hobart, Tasmania in 1877 to William and Alice (née Sprent) Nicholas, daughter of James Sprent. Harold spent his childhood in Bothwell at the family property Nant, and was educated at The Hutchins School, before earning his degree at Corpus Christi College, Oxford.

== Legal career ==
Nicholas was admitted to the bar of the Inner Temple in 1901 and returned to Australia in the same year, where he became a successful journalist writing for the Sydney Morning Herald and Daily Telegraph. From 1929-34 he was founding editor of the Australian Quarterly.

He was counsel advising the Royal Commission on the Constitution (1927–1929) and in December 1932 became a member of the Legislative Council of New South Wales as a member of the United Australia Party, remaining a member until 1934. In 1933-1935 he was the commissioner in a New South Wales Royal Commission into the creation of new states, of which no results came. He was appointed to the Supreme Court of New South Wales in 1935, and become Chief Judge in Equity in 1939, remaining so until 1948.

== Later life ==
Nicholas was Australian representative to the fourth meeting of UNESCO in 1949.

He died of coronary vascular disease on 11 June 1953. His ashes are interred in Bothwell with his parents and first wife. The altar at St Michael and All Angels Church in Bothwell commemorates him.
