= Frederick Roels =

Australian politician

Frederick Roels (17 August 1891 – 21 February 1939) was an Australian politician.

He was born in Sydney to iron moulder Sydney Fritz Roels and Emily Fusly. He became an engineer's apprentice at the age of fifteen and then worked on a timber mill. On 9 April 1921 he married Alice Mary Dolan. He was dismissed from his job during the 1929 strike and drove a crane on the construction of the Sydney Harbour Bridge. He was later a grocer and engine driver, and was active in the Trades and Labor Council. From 1931 to 1934 he was a Labor member of the New South Wales Legislative Council. He died at Botany in 1939.
