= Alfred Hemsley =

Australian politician

Alfred Macartney Hemsley (22 July 1860 – 12 July 1937) was an English-born Australian politician.

He was born in Ealing to solicitor Alexander Hemsley and Catherine Blackett. He attended the University of Oxford, where he received a Bachelor of Arts in 1886. He qualified as a solicitor in 1886 and in 1888 migrated to Sydney. He was a partner in a number of law firms, and from 1927 to 1937 he was a member of the New South Wales Legislative Council, first for the Nationalist Party and then for the United Australia Party. He died in Sydney in 1937.
