= Roydon McKillop =

Australian politician

Roydon George McKillop (1881 – 29 December 1951) was an Australian politician.

He was born in Orange to grazier George Duncan McKillop. He was a grazier at Narromine, and pioneered citrus growing in the area. In 1913, he married Violet Crago, with whom he had five children. On 7 December 1932 he was appointed to the New South Wales Legislative Council as a Country Party member, but he did not take his seat. He died at Narromine in 1951.
