= Daniel Rees (politician) =

Australian politician

Daniel Rees (10 March 1866 – 19 June 1934) was an Australian politician.

He was born in Waratah to miner Daniel Rees and Elizabeth Francis. He grew up in Lithgow and Wallsend and was a miner from the age of twelve. He was a member of the Miners' Union and from 1922 to 1934 general president of the Miners' Federation. He married Elizabeth Syme on 6 September 1888; they had three children. In December 1909, he was fined £100, in default two months imprisonment, for his role in that year's Newcastle coal strike. From 1931 to 1934 he was a Labor member of the New South Wales Legislative Council. Rees died in Leichhardt in 1934.
