= Ronald Grieve =

Australian politician

Sir Ronald Robinson Grieve
- Born: Herbert Ronald Robinson Grieve; 6 June 1896; Watsons Bay, New South Wales
- Died: 1 July 1982 (aged 86); Gosford, New South Wales
- Education: University of Sydney
- Occupation: politician
- Known for: member, New South Wales Legislative Council
- Parents: Gideon James Grieve (father); Julia Australia Robinson (mother)

Sir Herbert Ronald Robinson Grieve (6 June 1896 – 1 July 1982) was an Australian politician.

He was born in Watsons Bay, Sydney, to Gideon James Grieve and Julia Australia Robinson. He attended Sydney Grammar School before studying medicine at the University of Sydney, subsequently running a medical practice in Earlwood and Dulwich Hill. From 1932 to 1934, he was a United Australia Party member of the New South Wales Legislative Council. He was a member of the New South Wales Council of the British Medical Association from 1937 to 1956, serving as president from 1947 to 1948 and on the federal council from 1947 to 1956. Grieve was knighted in the 1958 New Year Honours. He died at Gosford in 1982.
