= Wilson Moses =

Australian politician

Wilson Haledon Moses (8 April 1881 – 23 February 1953) was an Australian politician.

He was born in Paddington. He moved to Griffith in 1915, and was involved with the Griffith Producers' Co-operative Company from 1921 until 1935, when he resigned as its manager to take up a position as manager of Penfolds in Sydney. Between 1932 and 1934, he was a Country Party member of the New South Wales Legislative Council. Later in life, he joined the Liberal Party, and served as vice-president of its Griffith branch. He died in Griffith in 1953.
