= Edward Collins (Australian politician) =

Australian politician

The Honourable Edward E. Collins

Member of the New South Wales Legislative Council
- In office 1934 – 1936
Local Government
Mayor of the Municipality of Wagga Wagga
In office 1912–1914
Preceded by	T. Dobney
Succeeded by	F.J. McDonough
In office 1917–1919
Preceded by	H. Oates
Succeeded by	I. Cullen
In office 10 December 1925 – 1927
Deputy	D.T. Byrnes
Preceded by	D.T. Byrnes
Succeeded by	W.F. Day
In office 1929–1934
Preceded by	W.F. Day
Succeeded by	H. McDonough
Alderman on Wagga Wagga Municipal Council
In office 1910–1922
In office 1923–1936

Personal details
- Born: Edward Easter Collins; 28 March 1866 Hawthorn, Melbourne, Victoria, British Empire
- Died: 8 April 1936 Manly, Sydney, New South Wales, Australia
- Party: United Australia Party; Citizens' Committee
- Spouse: Emma Clayton (m. 1885)
- Parents: Francis Smith Collins (father); Ellen Kibble (mother)

Edward Easter Collins (28 March 1866 – 8 April 1936) was an Australian politician who serves as a member of the New South Wales Legislative Council from 1934 to 1936. He also serves as the mayor of and an alderman on Wagga Wagga City Council intermittently between 1910 and 1936.

== Early life ==
Collins was born in Hawthorn to shepherd Francis Smith Collins and Ellen Kibble. He was educated in Geelong and became a wool merchant, settling in Wagga Wagga. In 1885 he married Emma Clayton, with whom he had two children.

== Local politics ==
Collins served as an alderman on Wagga Wagga Municipal Council from 1910 to 1922 and from 1923 to 1936. He served as mayor on four occasions and for a total of 13 years between 1912 and 1934 (1912–1914, 1917–1920, 1925–1927, 1928–1934).

In his third stint as mayor, Collins was elected over Alderman E. G. McGrath by 7 votes to 4. His predecessor D. T. Byrnes serves as his deputy.

== State politics ==
From 1932 to 1934 and from 1934 to 1936 he was a United Australia Party member of the New South Wales Legislative Council.

== Death ==
Collins died in Manly in 1936.
