= William Kirkness =

Australian politician

William Eames Kirkness (22 January 1862 – 12 February 1944) was an Australian politician.

He was born in Mudgee to machinist James Flett Kirkness and Emma Eames. He worked at Gosford and Woy Woy, ran a grocery at Waverley and farmed at Wisemans Ferry and Central Colo, but he was bankrupted in 1892. On 30 June 1887 he married Mary Dunlop, with whom he had six children. Discharged from bankruptcy in 1896, he returned to Gosford, where he became a councillor around 1900. From 1898 he worked as an orchardist, becoming active in the Fruitgrowers Association. From 1927 to 1934 he was a member of the New South Wales Legislative Council, representing the Nationalist and United Australia parties. Kirkness died in Gosford in 1944.
