= John Davoren (Australian politician) =

Australian politician

John Michael Davoren (30 August 1866 – 3 February 1941) was an Australian politician.

He was born in Goulburn to farmer Michael Davoren and Mary Welsh. He worked as a miner at Wallsend and then a ganger at Homebush, eventually farming near Wauchope. He married Mary Gertrude McGoldrick, with whom he had five children. A foundation member of the Labor Party, he served as a member of the New South Wales Legislative Council from 1931 to 1934. Davoren died in 1941 at Lidcombe.
