= Henry Manning (politician) =

Australian lawyer and politician

The Honourable Sir Henry Manning KBE QC
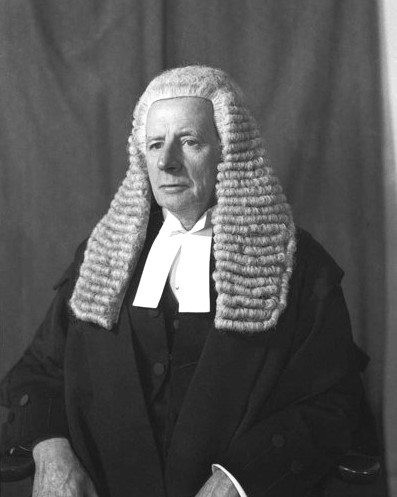

Attorney General of New South Wales
- In office 18 June 1932 – 16 May 1941
- Premier: Bertram Stevens; Alexander Mair
- Preceded by: Daniel Levy
- Succeeded by: Clarrie Martin

Vice-President of the Executive Council
- In office 18 June 1932 – 16 May 1941
- Premier: Bertram Stevens; Alexander Mair
- Preceded by: James Ryan
- Succeeded by: Reg Downing

Member of the Legislative Council of New South Wales
- In office 23 June 1932 – 22 April 1958

Personal details
- Born: 18 December 1877 Sydney, Colony of New South Wales
- Died: 3 May 1963 (aged 85) Randwick, New South Wales, Australia
- Party: United Australia Party; Democratic Party; Liberal Party
- Spouse: Nora Antonia Martin
- Relations: Sir William Patrick Manning (Father); Frederic Manning (Brother)

Sir Henry Edward Manning, KBE QC (18 December 1877 – 3 May 1963) was an Australian lawyer and politician. He was a member of the New South Wales Legislative Council for 25 years from 1932 to 1958 and also served as the Attorney General and Vice-President of the Executive Council from 1932 to 1941.

== Early life and legal career ==
Henry Edward Manning was born on 18 December 1877 in Sydney, New South Wales, the son of Sir William Patrick Manning, a prominent financier and future MP and Mayor of Sydney, and his wife Honora Torphy. Initially educated at Saint Ignatius' College, Riverview, Manning went on to study at the University of Sydney. Graduating with a Bachelor of Arts (BA) in 1900 and a Bachelor of Laws (LLB) in 1902, Manning was called to the Bar in 1902. After distinguishing himself in the NSW Western Circuit Court, Manning became an associate to Justice Richard O'Connor and a law reporter to the High Court of Australia from 1904 to 1905. In 1904 Manning married Nora Antonia Martin, the youngest daughter of Sir James Martin, and they had two daughters.

From 1905 Manning returned to practice at the New South Wales Bar, where he established a reputation in common law and the Vice Admiralty Court of New South Wales. Manning was appointed a King's Counsel (KC) in 1927 and was appointed as a deputy Judge of the Land and Valuation Court in 1929.

== Political career ==
Manning first attempted to enter NSW politics when he stood unsuccessfully as the Liberal Reform Party candidate for the New South Wales Legislative Assembly seat of Phillip at the 1910 election, the seat of King at the 1913 election, and again as the United Australia Party candidate in King at the 1932 election.

Despite this, Manning was nominated, and subsequently appointed for a life term, by Premier Bertram Stevens to the Legislative Council of New South Wales and then joined Stevens' second ministry as Attorney General and, by virtue of his now leadership of the government members in the Legislative Council, Vice-President of the Executive Council, on 17 June 1932. Manning, who had been interested in reforming of the council towards being a non-partisan House of review, involved himself in drafting a proposal, with support from Stevens, for an Upper House of sixty members, elected to a statewide electorate by a joint session of Parliament. His proposal, informed by the significant criticism of the elitist nature of the current Council, especially from the Labor Party, was subsequently adopted by parliament and approved at a statewide referendum in 1933.

Consequently, Manning, whose life appointment was now void, was elected to the new council for a six-year term on 7 November 1933, and retained his cabinet positions until government's defeat at the 1941 election. On 2 January 1939 he was knighted as a Knight Commander of the Order of the British Empire (KBE) "In recognition of service to politics and government" From 1934 to 1948 he was a fellow of the Senate of the University of Sydney.

In opposition, Manning was unofficially regarded as the leader of the non-Labor members but, affirmed of his beliefs regarding a non-partisan council, refused the role when offered to him. He further opposed in 1950 a proposal that the Liberal Party should form a party in the council, though his ideas for a non-partisan council came under attack from the Liberals and a Labor Party reanimating its longstanding policy to abolish the upper house. Elected to a second six-year term on 14 March 1946, he retired from the council in April 1958 and was granted the title "The Honourable" for life.

== Later life ==
Manning was chairman of MLC Limited from 1945 to 1961. By the end of his life considered "one of Australia's leading constitutional law experts", and survived by his two daughters, Manning died at his home following an Asthma attack in Randwick on 3 May 1963 and was buried in the Catholic section of Northern Suburbs cemetery after a service at St Mary's Cathedral, Sydney.

Political offices
Preceded by Daniel Levy	Attorney General of New South Wales; 1932 – 1941	Succeeded by Clarrie Martin
Preceded by James Ryan	Vice-President of the Executive Council; 1932 – 1941	Succeeded by Reg Downing
