= Robert Cruickshank (Australian politician) =

Australian politician

Member of the New South Wales Legislative Council
- In office 1921 – 1928
- Parliamentary group: Labor Party

Personal details
- Born: Robert Waugh Cruickshank; 10 December 1868 Edinburgh, Scotland
- Died: 6 November 1928 (aged 59) Camperdown, New South Wales, Australia
- Party: Labor Party
- Other political affiliations: Lang Labor
- Occupation: Journalist
- Profession: Librarian

Robert Waugh Cruickshank (10 December 1868 – 6 November 1928) was an Australian politician. Born in Edinburgh to tailor Robert John Cruickshank and Isabella Drysdale, he was educated at Moray House and Heriot-Watt College before becoming a librarian, later worked for a publishing company. He moved to Brisbane in the early 1890s, worked as a journalist for first Sir Charles Lilley's Chronicle, then Drakes Progress and finally the Sun and the Australian Worker.

He became a Reuters representative in Brisbane and Sydney, and from around 1911 was an advertising representative for the Australian Worker and the Labor Daily. He was a member of the Labor Party and contributed actively to the successful campaign against conscription in 1916. Cruickshank was appointed to the New South Wales Legislative Council in 1921 and served briefly as an honorary minister and Assistant Treasurer from May to October 1927. In 1927 Cruickshank, a strong supporter of Jack Lang, directed the Labor campaign.

== Family ==
On 11 March 1920, he married Maude Mary Leonard at North Sydney, with whom he had three children.

== Death ==
He died at Camperdown in 1928.
