= Treasurer of New South Wales =

Government minister in New South Wales, Australia

- Coat of arms of New South Wales

- Flag of New South Wales
- Incumbent; Daniel Mookhey since 28 March 2023
- New South Wales Treasury
- Style: The Honourable
- Member of: Parliament; Cabinet; Executive Council
- Reports to: Premier of New South Wales
- Seat: 52 Martin Place, Sydney
- Nominator: Premier of New South Wales
- Appointer: Governor of New South Wales on the advice of the premier
- Term length: At the governor's pleasure
- Formation: 24 April 1824
- First holder: William Balcombe (as Colonial Treasurer of New South Wales)

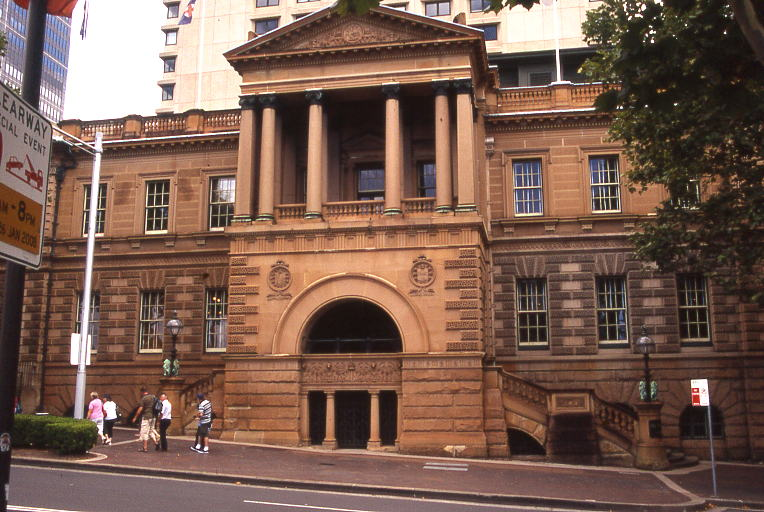
The old Treasury Building, designed by Mortimer Lewis (1849). The Treasury building was completed by Edmund Blacket and opened on the 17 October 1851. The Treasury moved to the State Office Block in 1967. In 1995 the Treasury moved to Governor Macquarie Tower in Farrer Place.

The treasurer of New South Wales, known from 1856 to 1959 as the colonial treasurer of New South Wales, is the minister in the Government of New South Wales responsible for government expenditure and revenue raising and is the head of the New South Wales Treasury. The treasurer plays a key role in the economic policy of the government.

The current treasurer, since 28 March 2023 is Daniel Mookhey.

Each year, the treasurer presents the NSW Budget to the Parliament. In some other countries the equivalent role is the minister for finance, although NSW has had a separate office of that name responsible for regulating government spending. For 103 years, the treasurer was originally known as the 'colonial treasurer', however the 'colonial' word was removed with the passing of the Ministers of the Crown Act 1959 (NSW) from 1 April 1959.

Treasurers Forster, Stuart, Dibbs, Jennings, Reid, Lyne, Waddell, Carruthers, McGowen, Holman, Fuller, Lang, Bavin, Stevens, Mair, McKell, McGirr, Cahill, Heffron, Renshaw, Askin, Lewis, Willis, Wran, Greiner, Fahey and Iemma were also premier during some or all of their period as treasurer.

Current Premier Chris Minns is the seventh consecutive premier who had not served as his own treasurer.

By convention, the treasurer is usually a member of the Legislative Assembly. The exception to this were Treasurers Egan, Costa, Roozendaal and currently Mookhey, who were members of the Legislative Council during their tenure as Treasurer. Egan is the longest serving Treasurer of New South Wales.

The treasurer administers their portfolio responsibilities through The Treasury cluster, and in particular The Treasury and a range of other government agencies.

== List of treasurers ==
Ordinal	Minister	Party	Title	Term start	Term end	Time in office	Notes
1	William Balcombe	Prior to responsible government	Colonial Treasurer	24 April 1824	19 March 1829	4 years, 329 days	
–	William Dumaresq	Prior to responsible government	Acting Colonial Treasurer	1 April 1829	31 July 1829	121 days	
2	Campbell Riddell	Prior to responsible government	Colonial Treasurer	23 August 1830	5 June 1856	25 years, 287 days	
–	Pieter Campbell	Prior to responsible government	Acting for the Colonial Treasurer	1 March 1839	8 May 1841	2 years, 68 days	
–	Francis Merewether	Prior to responsible government	Acting Colonial Treasurer	26 January 1854	27 February 1856	2 years, 32 days	
3	Thomas Holt	No party	Colonial Treasurer	6 June 1856	25 August 1856	80 days	
4	Robert Campbell	No party	Colonial Treasurer	26 August 1856	2 October 1856	37 days	
5	Stuart Donaldson	No party	Colonial Treasurer	3 October 1856	7 September 1857	339 days	
6	Richard Jones	No party	Colonial Treasurer	7 September 1857	3 January 1858	118 days	
(4)	Robert Campbell	No party	Colonial Treasurer	4 January 1858	30 March 1859	1 year, 85 days	
7	Elias Weekes	No party	Colonial Treasurer	18 April 1859	26 October 1859	191 days	
8	Saul Samuel	No party	Colonial Treasurer	27 October 1859	8 March 1860	133 days	
(7)	Elias Weekes	No party	Colonial Treasurer	9 March 1860	20 March 1863	3 years, 11 days	
9	Thomas Smart	No party	Colonial Treasurer	21 March 1863	15 October 1863	208 days	
10	Geoffrey Eagar	No party	Colonial Treasurer	16 October 1863	2 February 1865	1 year, 109 days	
(9)	Thomas Smart	No party	Colonial Treasurer	3 February 1865	19 October 1865	258 days	
(8)	Saul Samuel	No party	Colonial Treasurer	20 October 1865	3 January 1866	75 days	
11	Marshall Burdekin	No party	Colonial Treasurer	4 January 1866	21 January 1866	17 days	
(10)	Geoffrey Eagar	No party	Colonial Treasurer	22 January 1866	26 October 1868	2 years, 278 days	
(8)	Saul Samuel	No party	Colonial Treasurer	27 October 1868	15 December 1870	2 years, 49 days	
12	George Lord	No party	Colonial Treasurer	16 December 1870	13 May 1872	1 year, 149 days	
13	William Piddington	No party	Colonial Treasurer	14 May 1872	4 December 1872	204 days	
14	George Lloyd	No party	Colonial Treasurer	5 December 1872	8 February 1875	2 years, 65 days	
15	William Forster	No party	Colonial Treasurer	9 February 1875	7 February 1876	363 days	
16	Alexander Stuart	No party	Colonial Treasurer	8 February 1876	21 March 1877	1 year, 41 days	
(13)	William Piddington	No party	Colonial Treasurer	22 March 1877	16 August 1877	147 days	
17	William Long	No party	Colonial Treasurer	17 August 1877	17 December 1877	122 days	
18	Henry Cohen	No party	Colonial Treasurer	18 December 1877	20 December 1878	1 year, 2 days	
19	James Watson	No party	Colonial Treasurer	21 December 1878	4 January 1883	4 years, 14 days	
20	George Dibbs	No party	Colonial Treasurer	5 January 1883	21 December 1885	2 years, 350 days	
21	John Burns	No party	Colonial Treasurer	22 December 1885	25 February 1886	65 days	
22	Sir Patrick Jennings	No party	Colonial Treasurer	26 February 1886	19 January 1887	327 days	
(21)	John Burns	Protectionist	Colonial Treasurer	20 January 1887	16 January 1889	1 year, 362 days	
23	James Garvan	Free Trade	Colonial Treasurer	17 January 1889	7 March 1889	49 days	
24	William McMillan	Free Trade	Colonial Treasurer	8 March 1889	27 July 1891	2 years, 141 days	
25	Bruce Smith	Free Trade	Colonial Treasurer	14 August 1891	22 October 1891	69 days	
26	John See	Protectionist	Colonial Treasurer	23 October 1891	2 August 1894	2 years, 283 days	
27	George Reid	Free Trade	Colonial Treasurer	3 August 1894	3 July 1899	4 years, 334 days	
28	Joseph Carruthers	Free Trade	Colonial Treasurer	3 July 1899	13 September 1899	72 days	
29	Sir William Lyne	Protectionist	Colonial Treasurer	15 September 1899	20 March 1901	1 year, 186 days	
30	Thomas Waddell	Protectionist	Colonial Treasurer	10 April 1901	29 August 1904	3 years, 141 days	
(28)	Sir Joseph Carruthers	Liberal Reform	Colonial Treasurer	29 August 1904	1 October 1907	3 years, 33 days	
(30)	Thomas Waddell	Liberal Reform	Colonial Treasurer	2 October 1907	20 October 1910	3 years, 18 days	
31	James McGowen	Labor	Colonial Treasurer	21 October 1910	26 November 1911	1 year, 36 days	
32	John Dacey	Labor	Colonial Treasurer	27 November 1911	11 April 1912	136 days	
33	Campbell Carmichael	Labor	Colonial Treasurer	17 April 1912	5 May 1912	18 days	
34	John Cann	Labor	Colonial Treasurer	6 May 1912	29 January 1914	1 year, 268 days	
35	William Holman	Labor	Colonial Treasurer	29 January 1914	15 November 1916	4 years, 274 days	
35	William Holman	Nationalist	Colonial Treasurer	15 November 1916	30 October 1918	4 years, 274 days	
36	John Fitzpatrick	Nationalist	Colonial Treasurer	30 October 1918	12 April 1920	1 year, 165 days	
37	Jack Lang	Labor	Colonial Treasurer	12 April 1920	20 December 1921	1 year, 252 days	
38	Sir Arthur Cocks	Nationalist	Colonial Treasurer	20 December 1921	20 December 1921	7 hours	
(37)	Jack Lang	Labor	Colonial Treasurer	20 December 1921	13 April 1922	114 days	
(38)	Sir Arthur Cocks	Nationalist	Colonial Treasurer	13 April 1922	14 February 1925	2 years, 307 days	
39	George Fuller	Nationalist	Colonial Treasurer	14 February 1925	17 June 1925	123 days	
(37)	Jack Lang	Labor	Colonial Treasurer	17 June 1925	18 October 1927	2 years, 123 days	
40	Thomas Bavin	Nationalist	Colonial Treasurer	18 October 1927	15 April 1929	1 year, 179 days	
41	Bertram Stevens	Nationalist	Colonial Treasurer	16 April 1929	3 November 1930	1 year, 201 days	
(37)	Jack Lang	Labor	Colonial Treasurer	4 November 1930	15 October 1931	1 year, 191 days	
(37)	Jack Lang	Labor (NSW)	Colonial Treasurer	15 October 1931	13 May 1932	1 year, 191 days	
(41)	Bertram Stevens	United Australia	Colonial Treasurer	16 May 1932	13 October 1938	6 years, 150 days	
42	Alexander Mair	United Australia	Colonial Treasurer	13 October 1938	16 August 1939	307 days	
43	Athol Richardson	United Australia	Colonial Treasurer	16 August 1939	16 May 1941	1 year, 273 days	
44	Bill McKell	Labor	Colonial Treasurer	16 May 1941	6 February 1947	5 years, 266 days	
45	James McGirr	Labor	Colonial Treasurer	6 February 1947	3 April 1952	5 years, 57 days	
46	Joseph Cahill	Labor	Colonial Treasurer	3 April 1952	1 April 1959	7 years, 203 days	
46	Joseph Cahill	Labor	Treasurer	1 April 1959	22 October 1959	7 years, 203 days	
47	Bob Heffron	Labor	Treasurer	23 October 1959	28 October 1959	5 days	
48	Jack Renshaw	Labor	Treasurer	28 October 1959	13 May 1965	5 years, 197 days	
49	Sir Robert Askin	Liberal	Treasurer	13 May 1965	3 January 1975	9 years, 235 days	
50	Tom Lewis	Liberal	Treasurer	3 January 1975	23 January 1976	1 year, 20 days	
51	Sir Eric Willis	Liberal	Treasurer	23 January 1976	14 May 1976	112 days	
(48)	Jack Renshaw	Labor	Treasurer	14 May 1976	29 February 1980	3 years, 291 days	
52	Neville Wran	Labor	Treasurer	29 February 1980	2 October 1981	1 year, 216 days	
53	Ken Booth	Labor	Treasurer	2 October 1981	21 March 1988	6 years, 175 days	
54	Nick Greiner	Liberal	Treasurer	25 March 1988	24 June 1992	4 years, 91 days	
55	John Fahey	Liberal	Treasurer	24 June 1992	26 May 1993	336 days	
56	Peter Collins	Liberal	Treasurer	26 May 1993	4 April 1995	1 year, 313 days	
57	Michael Egan	Labor	Treasurer	4 April 1995	21 January 2005	9 years, 292 days	
58	Andrew Refshauge	Labor	Treasurer	21 January 2005	3 August 2005	194 days	
59	Morris Iemma	Labor	Treasurer	3 August 2005	17 February 2006	198 days	
60	Michael Costa	Labor	Treasurer	17 February 2006	5 September 2008	2 years, 204 days	
61	Eric Roozendaal	Labor	Treasurer	8 September 2008	28 March 2011	2 years, 208 days	
62	Mike Baird	Liberal	Treasurer	4 April 2011	23 April 2014	3 years, 19 days	
63	Andrew Constance	Liberal	Treasurer	23 April 2014	2 April 2015	344 days	
64	Gladys Berejiklian	Liberal	Treasurer	2 April 2015	30 January 2017	1 year, 303 days	
65	Dominic Perrottet	Liberal	Treasurer	30 January 2017	5 October 2021	4 years, 248 days	
66	Matt Kean	Liberal	Treasurer	5 October 2021	28 March 2023	1 year, 174 days	
67	Daniel Mookhey	Labor	Treasurer	28 March 2023	incumbent	3 years, 164 days	

== Former ministerial titles ==
=== Assistant treasurers ===
The assistant treasurer, when in use and along with the minister for finance, effectively acted as Deputy to the Treasurer. In January 1914, Henry Hoyle was appointed as an Honorary Minister in Holman ministry, charged with the duties of Colonial Treasurer, which was held by Premier Holman, but Hoyle was often referred to as the "assistant treasurer".

From 1925–1929, there existed the office of "Assistant Colonial Treasurer". However, this office was abolished and, when it returned in 1933, it was titled as "Assistant Treasurer". The assistant treasurer is not an essential cabinet post, often being appointed on an on-off basis, and there is no assistant treasurer at the present. Significantly, the role exists only when in use; there can be a lengthy period between successive holders of the title. The last assistant treasurer was John Della Bosca from 1999 to 2006. The title Minister for Finance is also used within New South Wales governments but that role is primarily made responsible for the revenue collection and administration side of governance.

Minister	Party	Title	Term start	Term end	Time in office	Notes
William Dick	Liberal Reform	Minister without portfolio assisting the Treasurer	29 August 1904	1 October 1907	3 years, 33 days	
Henry Hoyle	Labor	Minister without portfolio assisting the Treasurer	29 January 1914	31 October 1916	2 years, 276 days	
Bill McKell	Labor	Assistant Colonial Treasurer	17 June 1925	7 June 1927	1 year, 355 days	
Robert Cruickshank	Labor	Assistant Colonial Treasurer	19 September 1927	18 October 1927	29 days	
Bertram Stevens	Nationalist	Assistant Colonial Treasurer	18 October 1927	15 April 1929	1 year, 179 days	
Eric Spooner	United Australia	Assistant Treasurer	15 February 1933	21 August 1935	2 years, 187 days	
Clive Evatt	Labor	Assistant Treasurer	19 May 1947	23 February 1953	5 years, 280 days	
George Freudenstein	Country	Assistant Treasurer	11 March 1971	19 June 1972	1 year, 100 days	
Wal Fife	Liberal	Assistant Treasurer	19 June 1972	3 January 1975	2 years, 198 days	
Max Ruddock	Liberal	Assistant Treasurer	3 January 1975	10 October 1975	280 days	
Peter Coleman	Liberal	Assistant Treasurer	10 October 1975	23 January 1976	105 days	
Max Ruddock	Liberal	Assistant Treasurer	23 January 1976	14 May 1976	112 days	
Ken Booth	Labor	Assistant Treasurer	29 February 1980	2 October 1981	1 year, 216 days	
Phillip Smiles	Liberal	Assistant Treasurer	1 February 1991	1 February 1992	1 year, 0 days	
George Souris	National	Assistant Treasurer	3 July 1992	26 May 1993	327 days	
John Della Bosca	Labor	Assistant Treasurer	8 April 1999	17 February 2006	6 years, 315 days	

== See also ==
- List of New South Wales government agencies
- Deputy Premier of New South Wales
- Minister for Industrial Relations
- Minister for Finance
- Minister for Small Business
