= Michael Bruxner =

Australian politician

Lieutenant Colonel The Honourable Sir Michael Bruxner KBE, DSO, JP
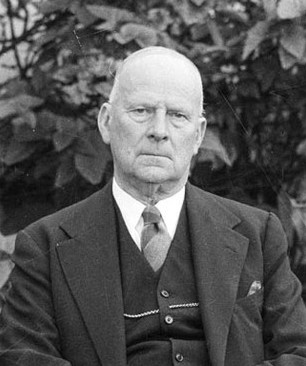
- Bruxner in 1951

1st Deputy Premier of New South Wales
- In office 16 May 1932 – 16 May 1941
- Premier: Bertram Stevens; Alexander Mair
- Preceded by: New title
- Succeeded by: Jack Baddeley

Minister for Transport
- In office 16 May 1932 – 16 May 1941
- Premier: Bertram Stevens; Alexander Mair
- Preceded by: James McGirr
- Succeeded by: Maurice O'Sullivan

Minister for Local Government
- In office 18 October 1927 – 3 November 1930
- Premier: Thomas Bavin
- Preceded by: Tom Keegan
- Succeeded by: William McKell
- In office 16 May 1932 – 17 June 1932
- Premier: Bertram Stevens
- Preceded by: James McGirr
- Succeeded by: Joseph Jackson

Member of the New South Wales Parliament for Tenterfield
- In office 14 September 1927 – 5 February 1962
- Preceded by: New district
- Succeeded by: Tim Bruxner

Personal details
- Born: 25 March 1882 Tabulum, Colony of New South Wales, British Empire
- Died: 28 March 1970 (aged 88) Sydney, New South Wales, Australia
- Spouse: Winnifred Caird
- Children: James Caird Bruxner; John Michael Bruxner; Helen Elizabeth Helps

Military service
- Allegiance: Australia
- Branch/service: Australian Army
- Years of service: 1911–1919
- Rank: Lieutenant Colonel
- Commands: 6th Light Horse Regiment
- Battles/wars: First World War; Gallipoli Campaign; Sinai and Palestine
- Awards: Knight Commander of the Order of the British Empire; Distinguished Service Order; Mentioned in Despatches (2); Chevalier of the Légion d'honneur (France)

Lieutenant Colonel Sir Michael Frederick Bruxner KBE, DSO, JP (25 March 1882 – 28 March 1970) was an Australian politician and soldier, serving for many years as leader of the Country Party (and its predecessors) in New South Wales. Born in the north of the state, Bruxner was educated at The Armidale School and started studies at University of Sydney but later dropped out to take up employment as a grazier and station agent in Tenterfield. After serving in the Citizen Military Forces from 1911, Bruxner enlisted into the Australian Light Horse upon the outbreak of the First World War in 1914. Serving with distinction in Gallipoli, Egypt and Palestine, he was promoted to lieutenant colonel and awarded the Distinguished Service Order.

Returning to Australia in 1919, Bruxner sold his business and joined the Progressive Party, being elected to the Parliament of New South Wales for Northern Tablelands at the 1920 election. Bruxner came to political prominence when he led the rural "True Blues" faction of the Progressive Party that went against their Leader's decision to form a coalition in Sir George Fuller's short-lived government in 1921. Bruxner emerged as the leader of the reduced Progressive Party, which consisted of the members of his faction, but they nevertheless joined with Fuller's Nationalists to form government in 1922. Bruxner also became involved in the New England New State Movement. Bruxner resigned the party leadership, now for the renamed Country Party, at the end of 1925.

At the 1927 election, with the abandonment of proportional representation, he won the new seat of Tenterfield unopposed. Bruxner was included in new Premier Thomas Bavin's cabinet as Minister for Local Government, which included the responsibility for transport. He served until Labor won the 1930 election. In April 1932 Bruxner was elected again as the new Country Party Leader, which he would hold continuously until 1958. When Sir Philip Game dismissed Jack Lang and called upon the Leader of the Opposition Bertram Stevens to form a caretaker government in 1932, Stevens formed a coalition with Bruxner's Country Party and Bruxner was named as the first Deputy Premier of New South Wales. Bruxner was also sworn in as Minister for Transport and briefly resumed his former Local Government portfolio. Bruxner also worked with his long-time friend and Minister for Education David Drummond, to establish the New England University College in 1938, which was later to become the University of New England.

Bruxner was central in ensuring Alexander Mair became Premier after Stevens was defeated in the house in August 1939. The Coalition lost government at the 10 May 1941 election and Bruxner would never again serve in government. The rest of Bruxner's parliamentary career was to be on the opposition benches, leading the Country Party through five more elections and through the instability of the larger opposition parties that eventually united as the Liberal Party. On 6 May 1958, Bruxner formally resigned as Leader of the Country Party, having served continuously in that role since 1932. He continued to serve in his capacity as Member for Tenterfield for one more term before retiring from politics before the 1962 election. Bruxner was Knighted as a KBE in 1962, and thereafter served in various capacities on boards and continued his passion for horses before his death aged 88 on 28 March 1970.

== Early life and military career ==
Bruxner was born in Tabulum, near the Clarence River in Northern New South Wales, the second son of English-born grazier Charles Augustus Bruxner (1851–1915) and his wife Sarah Elizabeth Barnes (1858–1941). Bruxner was initially educated in private tuition but was soon sent as a boarder first at St Mark's Crescent School in Darling Point, Sydney and then to The Armidale School, where he became School Captain in 1900. From 1901 to 1903, he studied arts and law at the University of Sydney while resident at St Paul's College, but was expelled for non-attendance of lectures.

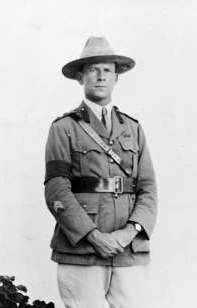
Lieutenant Colonel Bruxner in Palestine in November 1918.

Returning to home to work as a grazier, Bruxner eventually moved to Tenterfield and set up business as a Stock and station agent. He also purchased "Roseneath", a grazing property near Tenterfield, where he bred Hereford cattle. On 17 June 1908 at Christ Church, Kiama, he married Winifred Catherine Hay Caird. Bruxner became vice-president of the local agricultural society and of the Cricket and Rugby clubs in Tenterfield. Being a racehorse owner, Bruxner also rose to be President of the Tenterfield Jockey Club from 1909 to 1911. He was commissioned as a Justice of the Peace in 1914.

Bruxner started his military career when he was commissioned as a second lieutenant on 11 September 1911 in the 6th Australian (New England) Light Horse, Citizen Military Forces, which was redesignated the 5th the following year. When the First World War broke out in September 1914, Bruxner joined up soon after on 10 October 1914 with the 6th Light Horse Regiment in the Australian Imperial Force. Promoted to captain, Bruxner was sent with his unit to take part in the Gallipoli Campaign, being wounded several times. Later, in 1916, he commanded the 6th during part of the Battle of Romani and served with distinction in the Sinai and Palestine Campaign, for which he was mentioned in despatches twice. On 30 May 1917 was appointed by the President of France, Raymond Poincaré, as a Chevalier of the Légion d'honneur "in recognition of distinguished services during the campaign". Also in 1917, Bruxner was appointed to General Headquarters and rose to be assistant adjutant and quartermaster-general of the ANZAC Mounted Division. For his service he was promoted to lieutenant colonel and appointed as a Companion of the Distinguished Service Order (DSO) in 1919.

In July 1919, he returned Australia and was discharged a month later in August. Bruxner then returned to Tenterfield, sold his stock and station agency and went back to his property as a grazier. They eventually raised a family, having a daughter, Helen Elizabeth Bruxner, and two sons, James Caird and John Michael Bruxner.

== Early political career ==
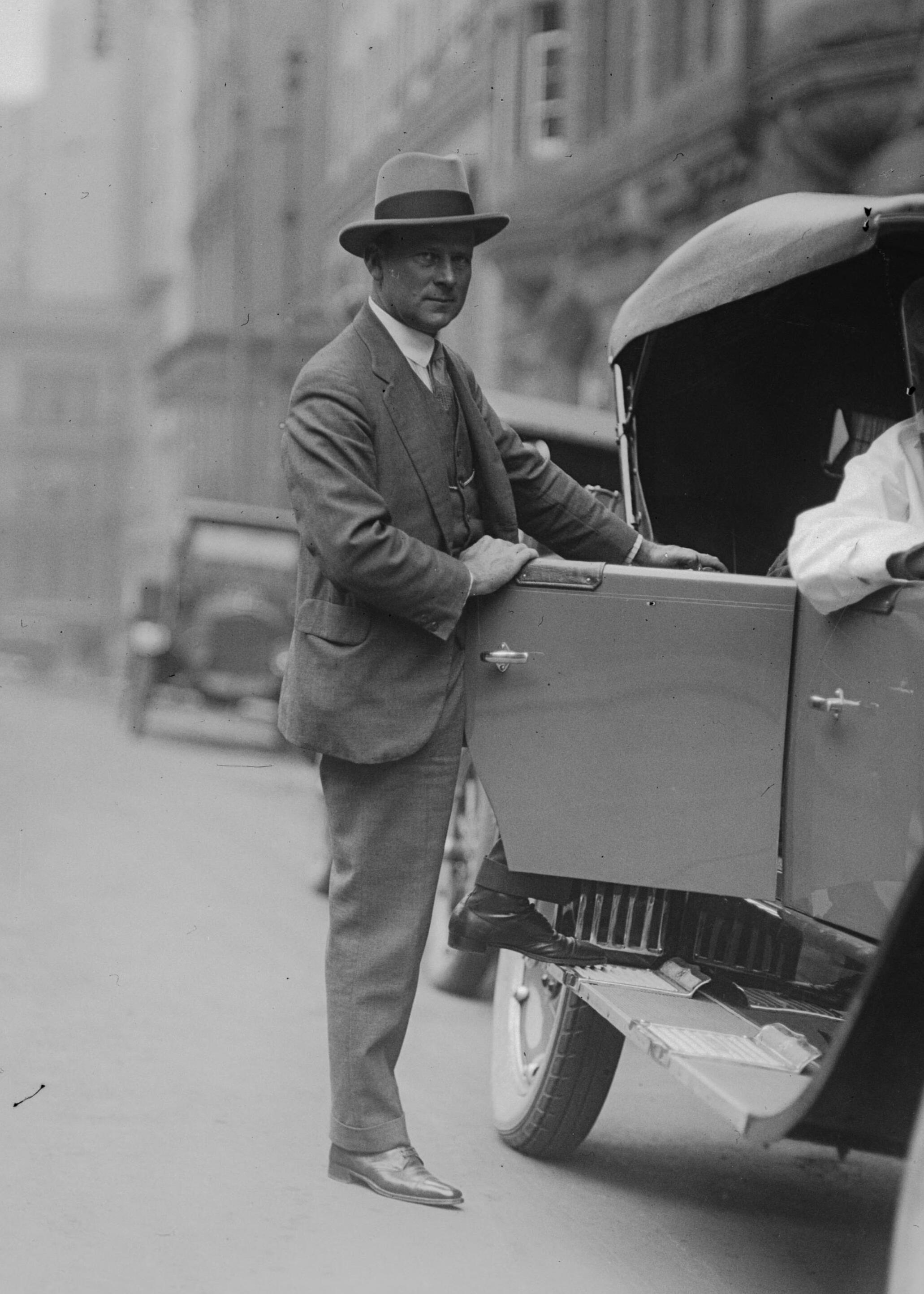
Bruxner in 1925 as leader of the Progressive Party

As a prominent member of his local community, Bruxner became involved in emerging movements to have a political force for regional areas and joined and was convinced by friends to stand as a Progressive Party candidate in the 1920 New South Wales state election. Bruxner was elected under proportional representation with 23% as the second member of the New South Wales Legislative Assembly district of Northern Tablelands alongside his friend David Drummond.

On 20 December 1920, the Labor Party Premier, James Dooley, and his cabinet resigned after having lost a vote in the New South Wales Legislative Assembly a week before. The Governor, Sir Walter Davidson, then commissioned the Leader of the Opposition, Sir George Fuller, as Premier. As Fuller did not have a majority, he initiated attempts to form a coalition with the Progressive Party. The Progressives split over whether to join the Fuller government into an urban wing, led by Leader Walter Wearne and Deputy Leader Thomas Bavin, which agreed to enter Fuller's coalition and a rural wing ("The True Blues"), led by Bruxner and Ernest Buttenshaw who offered Fuller only conditional support. After seven hours in government, still without a workable majority, Fuller requested a double-dissolution from Davidson. Davidson refused, on the basis that Dooley still had a majority in the lower house, and Fuller resigned.

Davidson then re-commissioned Dooley, who was then granted a dissolution for an election in March 1922. The Progressives were permanently divided and Bruxner and the "True Blues" who had opposed the coalition maintained their separate identity, while the urban members of the party joined Fuller's Nationalist Party. The Rural Progressives then elected Bruxner in 1922 as Leader for the election. The Progressives were reduced to nine rural members at the 1922 election and entered a Coalition with the Nationalists. Bruxner increased his margin to become the first electorate member with 39%. Bruxner also became involved in the New England New State Movement and helped pass a formal request to the Commonwealth by the Legislative Assembly to establish a new state in northern New South Wales. The request resulted in the 1924 Cohen Royal Commission into New States.

At the May 1925 election, Bruxner retained his seat with an increased margin of 41%, while the Nationalist/Progressive Government lost office to Jack Lang and the Labor Party. After the election, the Progressive party renamed themselves the Country Party, reflecting the electoral base of the party. Bruxner resigned the leadership at the end of 1925, citing the difficulty in balancing the needs of his family with the commitments of his political career, and was succeeded by Ernest Buttenshaw.

== Minister of the Crown ==
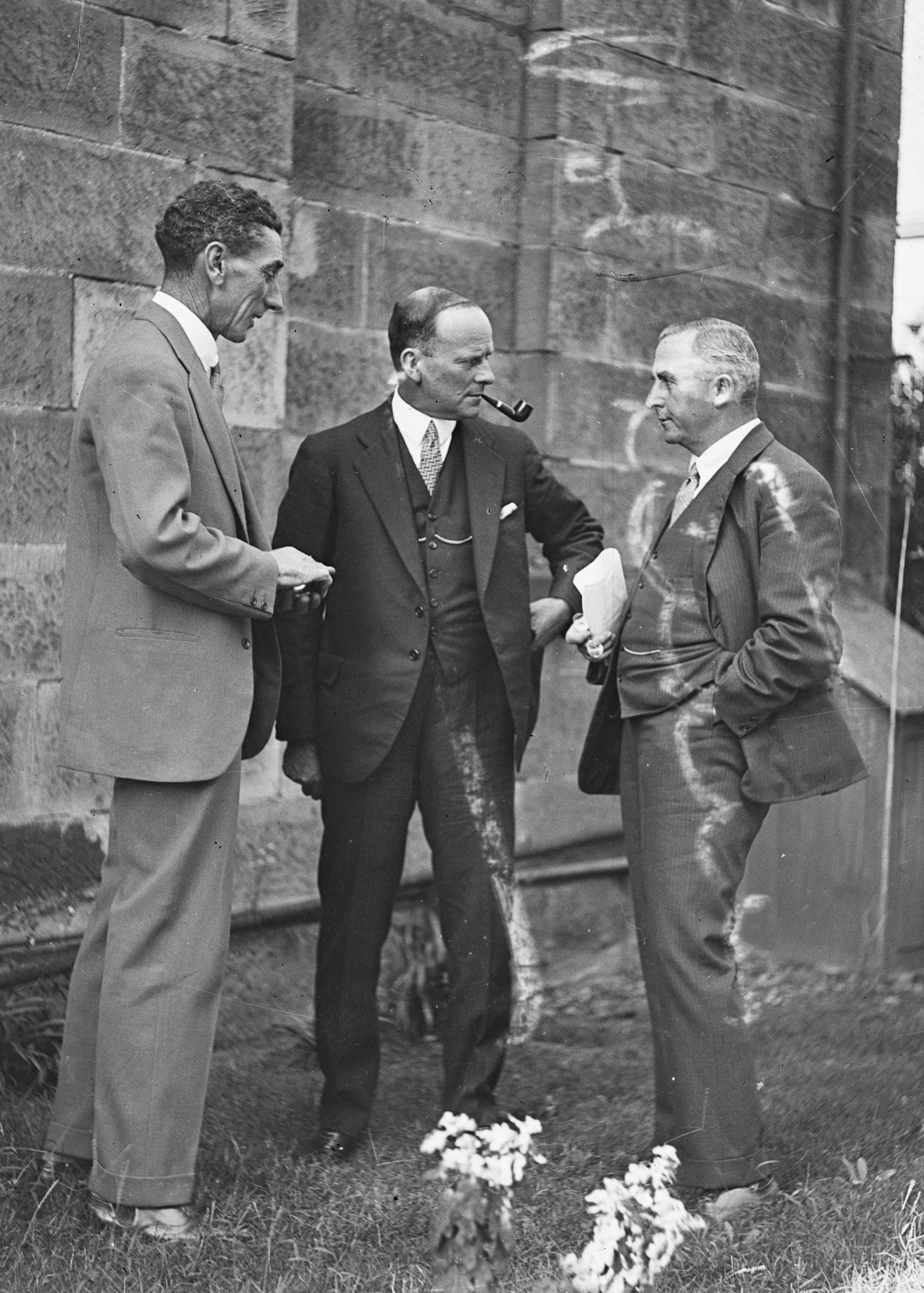
Bruxner in 1928 with fellow Country Party members Bill Hedges and Alf Pollack

At the 1927 election, with the abandonment of proportional representation, he won the new seat of Tenterfield unopposed. At the election, Lang's Labor Party was defeated and Bruxner was included in new Premier Bavin's cabinet as Minister for Local Government, which included the responsibility for transport. As Minister, Bruxner was responsible for the amendment to the Main Roads Act which gave more powers to the Main Roads Board and provided for the reclassification of the principal roads of the State. All the roads of the state were classified in accordance with their order of importance, which formed the basis for which road development was funded. His view that transport should be a public asset was reinforced when he brought through the passage of the Transport Act 1930, which regulated private bus services to prevent the collapse of government-owned tramways and railways. He remained as Minister until the Bavin Government was defeated by Lang at the 1930 election. At the election, Bruxner retained his seat with 59%. On 23 December 1930, Bruxner was granted by King George V retention of the title "The Honourable" for having served for more than three years as a Member of the Executive Council of New South Wales.

In 1931 Bruxner moved a motion to censure Sydney University Professor of Philosophy John Anderson for his statements that war memorials were "political idols". The motion was vigorously debated but did not pass.

As the political climate in New South Wales became more volatile after Lang's attempts to abolish the Legislative Council and conflict with the Federal Government over debts, Bruxner emphasised the need that the Country Party remain independent of the United Australia Party (which had succeeded the Nationalist Party) amidst calls for the opposition to unite. On 26 April 1932, Country Party Leader Buttenshaw notified the party of his intention to resign. Bruxner was then elected as the new party Leader.

== Deputy Premier ==
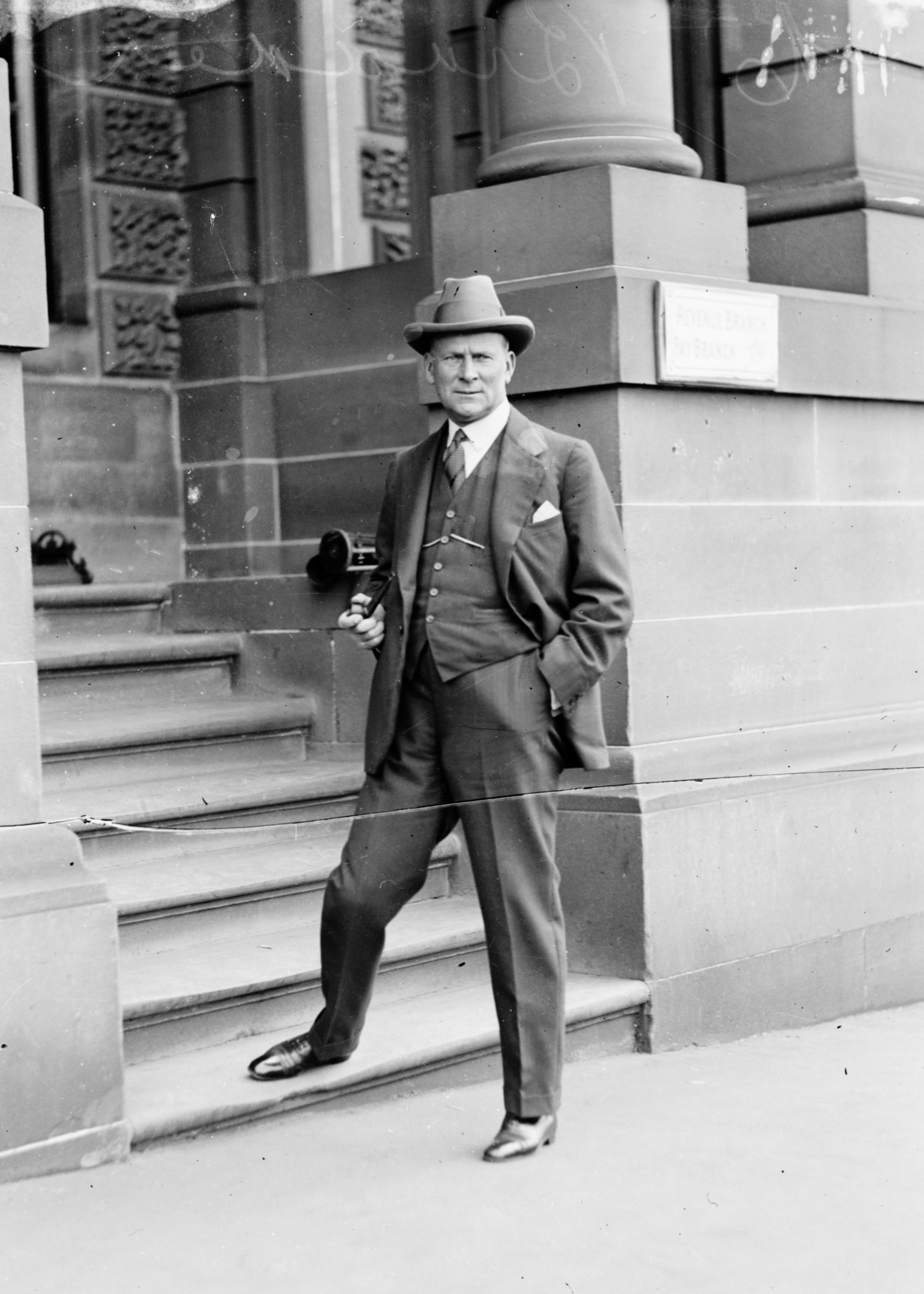
Bruxner entering the Treasury Building, Sydney in 1932

Not long after, on 13 May Governor Sir Philip Game dismissed the Lang government and called upon the Leader of the Opposition and UAP Leader Bertram Stevens to form a caretaker government. Stevens formed a coalition with Bruxner's Country Party and immediately called an election. Lang's NSW Labor Party was heavily defeated and the Country Party gained eleven seats and held five seats on the cabinet. Bruxner retained his seat again unopposed (he would be elected unopposed a total of five times during his term). This time, the Country Party was an equal partner in the coalition and Bruxner was named as the first Deputy Premier of New South Wales. Sworn in on 16 May 1932 as Minister for Transport, Bruxner also briefly resumed his former Local Government portfolio during the caretaker period until 17 June 1932.

Insistent that his party take an equal role in the coalition government, Bruxner formed a good working relationship and long-lasting friendship with Stevens that would ensure the government's stability. The Stevens government had significant success, reducing Lang's 2 million pound deficit by 75%. However, one significant problem was that Stevens had trouble with an unruly backbench, and increasingly depended upon Bruxner and the Country Party. As Deputy Premier, Bruxner saw himself as loyal to Stevens, but still managed to push through several initiatives that specifically benefited rural areas, including another royal commission on the question of new States in 1935. The May 1935 election saw Stevens and Bruxner retaining government against a divided and fractious Labor opposition and Bruxner was returned unopposed again in his seat.

Bruxner detested the UAP Deputy Leader and Minister for Public Works and Local Government, Eric Spooner, whom Bruxner saw as trying to undermine confidence in Steven's leadership and reducing Country Party influence in the government. When Stevens went on a visit to London in March 1936 for six months until October, Bruxner became Acting Premier, with Spooner as Acting Deputy. The animosity between the two became most pronounced at this time, often over the most petty issues. In May 1937, Bruxner visited the United Kingdom as a member of the NSW parliamentary delegation to the coronation of King George VI. At the March 1938 election, the Stevens-Bruxner government retained power against Lang and the still-divided Labor Party. Bruxner was re-elected with 61% of the vote. Bruxner worked with his long-time friend, now Minister for Education David Drummond, to establish a regional tertiary education institution. After the 1938 election, they moved to establish the New England University College, a constituent college of the University of Sydney in the city of Armidale, and Bruxner was appointed to the first Advisory Council, on which he served until 1951.

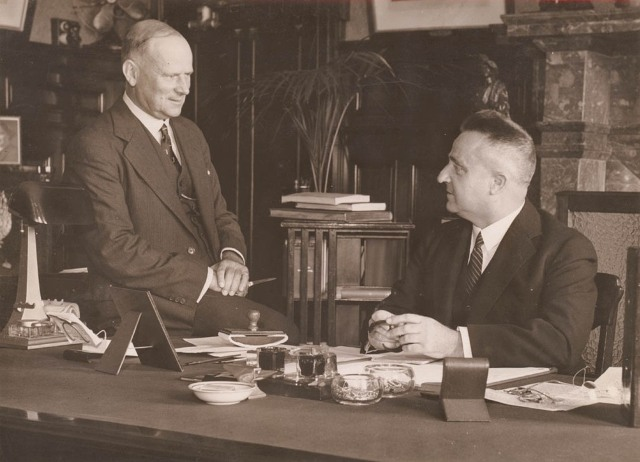
Bruxner (left) with Premier Stevens in 1939. Bruxner worked well with Stevens and their friendship ensured the government's survival for a record nine years.

In July 1939, Stevens and Colonial Treasurer Alexander Mair attempted to address Spooner's unwillingness to accede to cabinet decisions regarding ministerial expenditure by creating a committee of four, consisting of Mair, Stevens, Spooner and Bruxner, to approve all expenditure. Furious at this gesture, Spooner resigned on 21 July 1939 as Minister and Deputy Leader, citing a 'disagreement in government policy on relief works' as the reason. Despite Spooner's departure, the stability of the government was to be short. On 1 August 1939, Spooner carried a motion of no confidence in Stevens in the house, which unexpectedly passed by two votes, owing to the absence of several ministers. On 3 August Stevens tendered his resignation to the Governor, Lord Wakehurst, but was granted several days to remain until his successor was chosen.

Upon Stevens' resignation, Spooner was touted as a possible successor. However, Bruxner had always detested Spooner and let it be known that he and his Country Party colleagues would not serve under him. At a UAP party meeting on 5 August, Spooner chose not to nominate and Stevens' favoured candidate, Alexander Mair, defeated Athol Richardson 18 votes to 6 to become the new leader of the UAP. Mair, who got on well with Bruxner, was sworn in as Premier by Lord Wakehurst on the same day, ensuring the survival of the coalition government. Mair attempted to shore up unity in his party to save the government. In the last months of government Bruxner was preoccupied with preparation for Australia's entry into the Second World War. He equipped railway workshops with modern machine tools and established National Emergency Services to deal with air raids.

However, despite the efforts of Mair and Bruxner, the controversy surrounding Stevens' departure and a resurgent Labor Party, now led by the moderate William McKell, ensured that the popularity of the government never recovered. At the campaign for the 10 May 1941 election, the government performed poorly, finding it difficult to distinguish themselves from the past and proposing policies but only promising action after the war. McKell's Labor Party did the opposite, leaving war matters to the federal government and promising current reforms. At the election, the Labor Party polled more than half the vote while Bruxner's Country Party lost nine seats and Mair's UAP lost twenty seats. Bruxner retained his seat with 56%. Bruxner would never again hold ministerial office and the conservative political forces would not take government again until Robert Askin and Charles Cutler won the 1965 election.

== In opposition ==
The rest of Bruxner's parliamentary career was to be on the opposition benches, due largely to the disintegration of the larger opposition party, the UAP, after the 1943 Federal election. A large number of former UAP members then formed the Democratic Party in New South Wales, led by Mair, who continued as Opposition Leader. Mair resigned as Democratic Party Leader on 10 February 1944, to be replaced by former Assembly Speaker Reginald Weaver. At the 1944 election, Bruxner's stable leadership ensured that the Country Party retained all ten of its seats in the Legislative Assembly. Bruxner retained his seat with 67.73%.

Bruxner witnessed the fragmented opposition parties forming into the Liberal Party in 1945, under the leadership of Weaver, Mair and then former Justice Minister Vernon Treatt from March 1946. Bruxner led the party, again being elected unopposed, again at the May 1947 election, achieving an overall gain of 5 seats from independents and the Labor Party, now led by James McGirr. Recognising the importance of the larger Liberals to opposing Labor while also being responsive to the needs of the Country Party's rural voters, Bruxner maintained the Country Party's coalition with the Liberals as well as trying to prevent seat conflicts between the two parties. However, it was to be the persistence of these "tri-cornered" contested seats between Labor, Liberal and Country candidates that were to prove problematic not only for maintaining the coalition but also for attempting to wrest government from Labor.

Treatt and Bruxner led the Coalition at the 17 June 1950 election, which resulted in a hung parliament. The Country Party gained two seats for a total of 17 for a Coalition total of 46 seats. With the Labor Party also holding 46 seats, the balance of power lay with the two re-elected Independent Labor members, James Geraghty and John Seiffert, who had been expelled from the Labor Party for disloyalty during the previous parliament. Seiffert was readmitted and, with the support of Geraghty, McGirr and Labor were able to stay in power. Bruxner retained his seat with 60%. He sold his "Roseneath" property in 1950 and in 1951 bought the homestead section of Old Auburn Vale station, dividing his time between there and his Sydney residence in Bellevue Hill.

The near loss of the election by Labor further weakened McGirr's position and he was replaced as premier by Joseph Cahill in April 1952. Cahill had won popular support as a vigorous and impressive minister who had resolved problems with New South Wales' electricity supply and in his first 10 months as premier had reinvigorated the party. He brought order to the government's chaotic public works program. In addition, he attacked the increasingly unpopular federal Coalition government of Robert Menzies. All this, combined with Bruxner and Treatt constantly clashing over policy and candidate issues, contributed to the Liberal-Country Coalition again being defeated at the 14 February 1953 election. This amounted to a total loss of ten seats, three being Country Party seats, and a swing against them of 7.2%. Bruxner retained his seat with 60.15%.

Murray Robson replaced Treatt as Leader of the Opposition in August 1954. Like other senior members of the Liberals, after having no conservative government since Alexander Mair in 1941, Robson had no experience in government, he had little interest in policy except for Cold War anti-communism, ignored majority views of his party and fellow parliamentary colleagues and Robson's attempts to forge a closer alliance with Bruxner and the Country Party, failed dismally and alienated him from many in his party. Robson was replaced by Pat Morton as leader in September 1955. Bruxner, now aged 70 and having fallen ill several times, led the Country Party one last time at the March 1956 election, which resulted in another labour victory and Country Party regained the seat of Armidale, but overall the government's majority fell from twenty to six. Bruxner retained Tenterfield unopposed.

On 6 May 1958, Bruxner formally resigned as Leader of the Country Party, having served continuously in that role since 1932. He continued to serve in his capacity as Member for Tenterfield, retaining his seat one final time at the March 1959 election, with 68% of the vote. After a final term he retired from the assembly before the election in 1962.

== Retirement and legacy ==
Upon his retirement, his youngest son, James Caird (Tim) Bruxner, who had served with distinction in the 2nd AIF and the Royal Australian Air Force during World War II, gained preselection for his father's vacated seat, allegedly against his parents' advice, and won it at the 1962 election. Tim Bruxner went on to become a member of the Askin, Lewis and Willis Cabinets from 1973 to 1976, including in his father's old portfolio as Minister for Transport and as Deputy Leader of the Country Party. His eldest son, John Michael Bruxner, having graduated from Sydney University with honours in law in 1935, was admitted to the Bar in 1936 and also served in the 2nd AIF as an officer. On 2 June 1954, he was appointed as a Judge of the District Court of New South Wales.

Upon retiring from politics, Bruxner was made a Knight Commander of the Order of the British Empire in the Queen's New Years Honours of1962 "for political and public services". On 2 November 1959, the Mains Roads Board named the highway spanning across Northern NSW as the "Bruxner Highway" in recognition of his services to transport and roads in NSW. Throughout his life, Bruxner had maintained his passion for horses, including as a member of the Australian Jockey Club and the Sydney Turf Club. From 1960 Bruxner was also Deputy President of the Royal Agricultural Society of New South Wales. His wife Winifred having died the year before in 1969, Bruxner died on 28 March 1970, survived by his daughter and both sons. His portrait by William Chandler is in the National Party offices in Sydney, and a sketch of him by George Washington Lambert is in the Australian War Memorial, Canberra.

== Notes ==
New South Wales Legislative Assembly
New district	Member for Northern Tablelands; 1920 – 1927; With: Drummond, McClelland	District abolished
New district	Member for Tenterfield; 1927 – 1962	Succeeded by Tim Bruxner
Political offices
Preceded by Tom Keegan	Minister for Local Government; 1927 – 1930	Succeeded by William McKell
New title	Deputy Premier of New South Wales; 1932 – 1941	Succeeded by Jack Baddeley
Preceded by James McGirr	Minister for Transport; 1932 – 1941	Succeeded by Maurice O'Sullivan
Preceded by James McGirr	Minister for Local Government; 1932	Succeeded by Joseph Jackson
New title	Minister in Charge of National Emergency Services; 1939 – 1941	Succeeded by Hubert Primrose
Party political offices
Preceded by Walter Wearne	Leader of the Progressive Party; 1922 – 1925	Succeeded by Himself as Leader of the Country Party
Preceded by Himself as Leader of the Progressive Party	Leader of the New South Wales Country Party; 1925	Succeeded by Ernest Buttenshaw
Preceded by Ernest Buttenshaw	Leader of the New South Wales Country Party; 1932 – 1958	Succeeded by Davis Hughes
