= Eric Spooner =

Australian politician (1891–1952)

The Honourable Eric Spooner
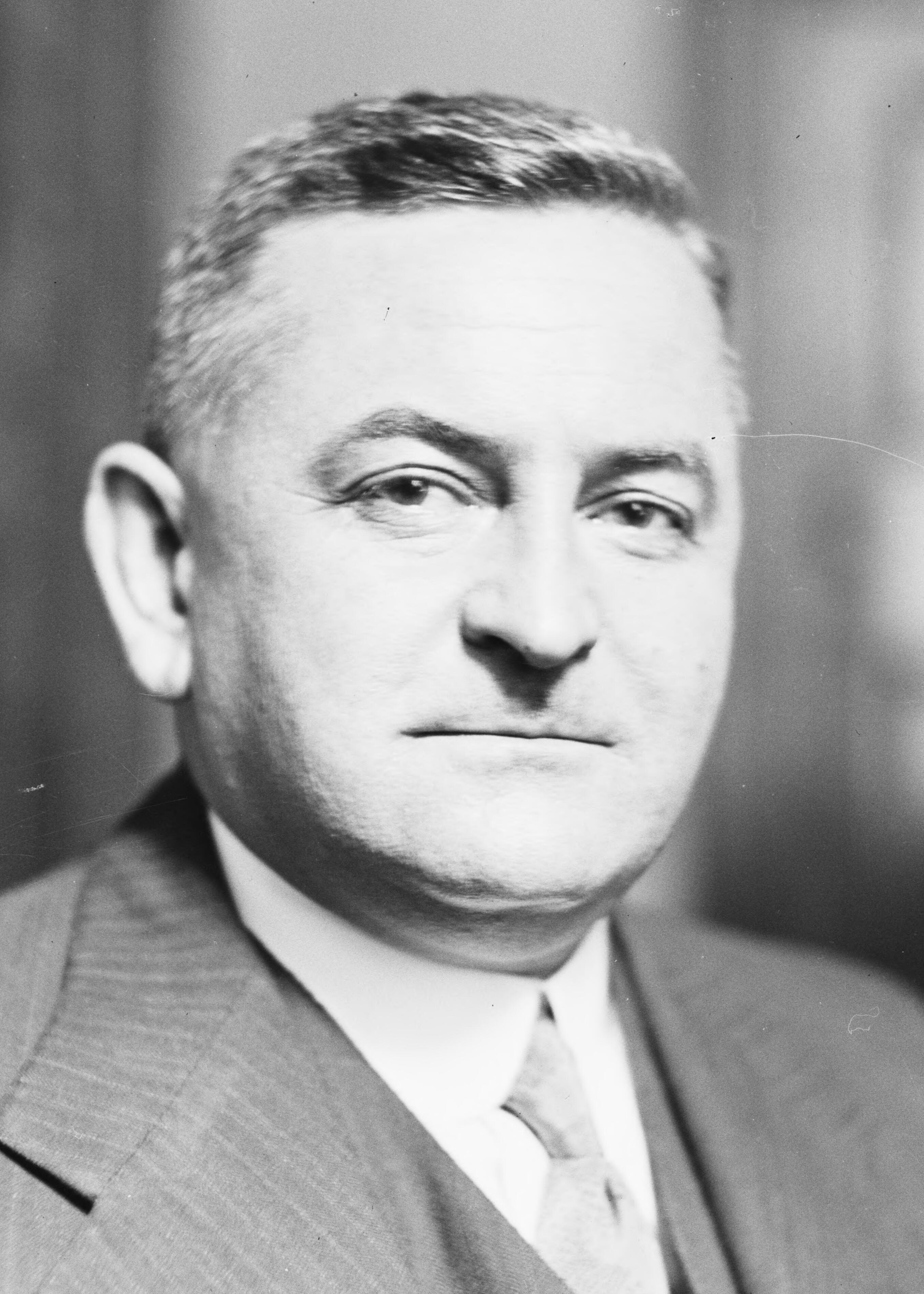

Secretary for Public Works
- In office 22 August 1935 – 21 July 1939
- Premier: Bertram Stevens
- Preceded by: Bertram Stevens
- Succeeded by: Bertram Stevens

Minister for Local Government
- In office 15 February 1933 – 21 July 1939
- Premier: Bertram Stevens
- Preceded by: Joseph Jackson
- Succeeded by: Bertram Stevens

Member of the New South Wales Parliament for Ryde
- In office 11 June 1932 – 23 August 1940
- Preceded by: Evan Davies
- Succeeded by: Arthur Williams

Member of the Australian Parliament for Robertson
- In office 21 September 1940 – 21 August 1943
- Preceded by: Sydney Gardner
- Succeeded by: Thomas Williams

Personal details
- Born: 1 March 1891 Waterloo, Colony of New South Wales
- Died: 3 June 1952 (aged 61) Sydney, New South Wales, Australia
- Party: United Australia Party
- Spouse: Mary Berry
- Relations: Bill Spooner (Brother)
- Occupation: Accountant

Eric Sydney Spooner (2 March 1891 – 3 June 1952) was an Australian politician.

== Early life ==
Spooner was born in the Sydney suburb of Waterloo and educated at Christ Church St Laurence School. At 14 he became a telegraph messenger and studied at night at the University of Sydney to gain a diploma in economics and commerce. He married Mary Berry in December 1919. He established the accounting firm of Hungerford, Spooner & Co in 1922 with his brother Bill, a Liberal cabinet minister from 1949 to 1964.

== State politics ==
Spooner was elected the seat of Ryde in 1932 and became an honorary minister in the United Australia Party government of Bertram Stevens. He subsequently became Assistant Treasurer and Minister for Local Government. From 1935 he was Minister for Local Government, Secretary for Public Works and deputy leader of the United Australia Party (NSW Branch). He was responsible for establishing employment-creating schemes and the Sydney County Council, a gas and electricity supplier. In 1939 he opposed budget cuts and resigned from Cabinet on 21 July. On 1 August, he moved a moved a motion that was critical of the proposal to cut government spending in order to restrain a growing deficit, with Spooner personally attacking Stevens, describing him as running the party as a dictatorship. The coalition had a large majority in the assembly, however the motion was passed 43 to 41, with nine United Australia members joining Spooner in voting against the government. Spooner's ambitions to replace Stevens as leader were thwarted as the Leader of the Country Party, Michael Bruxner, refused to join a coalition with him and Alexander Mair succeeded Stevens as Premier.

=== Spooner bathing costume ===
As the NSW Minister for Local Government, Spooner introduced an ordinance, commencing on 1 September 1935, regulating the design of swimsuits, principally aimed at males who were wearing swim trunks which left their chests bare. The lowering of the upper part of a costume to show a bared chest was considered by some people, including the Bega branch of the Country Women's Association, as "disgraceful, and [meriting] rigorous attention". A clergyman maintained that "if men were allowed to wear shorts, girls would want shorts and brassieres and that would lead to a steady increase of undesirable conduct on our beaches".

Protests were received from the Surf Life Saving Association of Australia, and the ordinance was derided as inappropriate for competitive swimming. The prohibitive purchase cost of the required swimming costume was also mentioned. Spooner noted the change legalised costumes currently in use and removed the older "neck to knee" costumes ordinance, dating from 1910.

The State of Victoria followed Spooner's regulation. The law was still in effect in NSW in 1950.

== Federal politics and later life ==
In August 1940 Spooner resigned his seat and won the Federal seat of Robertson in the October election. In June 1941, he was appointed Minister for War Organisation of Industry in the third Menzies Ministry, a position he retained until the fall of the Fadden government in October 1941. He lost his seat in the 1943 election. He joined the new Liberal Party, but was almost expelled for questioning the White Australia Policy. He ran unsuccessfully against Prime Minister Ben Chifley in Macquarie in 1946.

Spooner died of cancer in Sydney in 1952, survived by his wife, three sons and daughter.

== Notes ==
Parliament of New South Wales
Political offices
Vacant Title last held by Bertram Stevens	Assistant Treasurer; 1933 – 1935	Vacant Title next held by Clive Evatt
Preceded by Joseph Jackson	Minister for Local Government; 1933 – 1939	Succeeded by Bertram Stevens
Preceded by Bertram Stevens	Secretary for Public Works; 1935 – 1939	Succeeded by Bertram Stevens
Party political offices
Preceded by Reginald Weaver	Deputy Leader of the United Australia Party (NSW Branch); 1935 – 1939	Succeeded by Athol Richardson
New South Wales Legislative Assembly
Preceded by Evan Davies	Member for Ryde; 1932–1940	Succeeded by Arthur Williams
Parliament of Australia
Political offices
New title	Minister for War Organisation of Industry; 1941	Succeeded by John Dedman
Australian House of Representatives
Preceded by Sydney Gardner	Member for Robertson; 1940–1943	Succeeded by Thomas Williams
