= James Ryan (Australian politician) =

Australian politician

James Ryan (1863 – 21 June 1940) was an Irish-born Australian politician.

He was born in Doon in County Tipperary to farmers Patrick and Alice Ryan. He migrated to Melbourne at a young age to join his uncle, who soon died, then went to New Zealand and finally Sydney around 1884. He was an assisted road superintendent around Orange and Lithgow before becoming a journalist with the Lithgow Mercury. He married schoolteacher Margaret Redmond, with whom he had three children. He was managing editor of the Mercury from 1889 to 1926. From 1917 to 1940 he was a member of the New South Wales Legislative Council, first for the Nationalist Party and then for the United Australia Party. He was a minister without portfolio from 1927 to 1930, vice-president of the Executive Council for a month in May–June 1932, and minister without portfolio again from 1932 to 1938. Ryan died in Nowra in 1940.
