= Herbert Hawkins (politician) =

Australian politician

Herbert Middleton Hawkins (29 October 1876 – 16 June 1939) was an English-born Australian politician.

Born in Brixton to accountant Thomas Richardson and Ann Butlers, he was educated at Westminster and migrated to Australia around 1895. He became a real estate agent, and managing director of a real estate firm. He married B. Buchanan on 5 November 1899; they had three children. A second marriage, in July 1938 to Gwendoline Jupp, was childless. From 1932 to 1939 he was a United Australia Party member of the New South Wales Legislative Council. He served as minister without portfolio from 1932 to 1933, assistant Colonial Secretary from 1933 to 1935, Minister for Social Services from 1935 to 1938 and Minister for Labour and Industry from 1938 to 1939. Hawkins died in Sydney in 1939.

He died after falling from the window of his office on the seventh-floor of the A.P.A. Building, Martin Place, Sydney.
