= Members of the New South Wales Legislative Council, 1940–1943 =

Members of the New South Wales Legislative Council were mostly elected at the 1933 and 1936 elections. A further 15 were elected by a joint sitting of the New South Wales Parliament in November 1939. The President was Sir John Peden.

Name	Party	End term	Years in office
Alexander Alam	Labor	1946	1925–1958, 1963–1973
George Archer	Labor	1949	1925–1949
Thomas Armstrong	United Australia	1949	1935–1955
George Bassett	Country	1952	1932–1964
Alfred Binks	United Australia	1952	1932–1952
William Bradley (Note: James Ryan (United Australia) died on 21 June 1940. William Bradley (United Australia) was elected as his replacement on 22 October 1940.)	United Australia	1949	1940–1949
Charles Bridges (Note: John O'Regan (Labor) died on 28 October 1940. Charles Bridges (Labor) was elected as his replacement on 3 December 1940.)	Labor	1943	1925–1937, 1940–1943
Keith Brooks	United Australia	1946	1939–1946
Walter Cambridge	Country	1946	1932–1946
Hector Clayton	Independent	1949	1937–1973
Joseph Coates	Labor	1952	1921–1943
Arthur Colvin	United Australia	1943	1932–1955
James Concannon	Labor	1946	1925–1958
John Culbert	Labor	1949	1925–1943
William Dickson	Labor	1952	1925–1934, 1940–1966
Reg Downing	Labor	1952	1940–1972
Maxwell Dunlop (Note: Maxwell Dunlop (Country) died on 1 August 1941. John Stewart (Labor) was elected as his replacement on 24 September 1941.)	Country	1943	1932–1941
Jim Eggins	Country	1952	1940–1949
Ernest Farrar	United Australia	1946	1912–1952
James Graves	Labor	1949	1934–1961
Edward Grayndler (Note: Edward Grayndler (Labor) died on 12 March 1943. The vacancy carried over to the next parliament.)	Labor	1946	1921–1934, 1936–1943
Herbert Henley	Country	1952	1937–1964
Thomas Holden	United Australia	1952	1934–1945
Henry Horne	United Australia	1946	1917–1955
Sir Archibald Howie	United Australia	1952	1934–1943
Sir Norman Kater	Country	1943	1923–1955
Francis Kelly (Note: Thomas Tyrrell (Labor) died on 31 October 1942. Francis Kelly (Labor) was elected as his replacement on 20 November 1942.)	Labor	1943	1942–1947
Robert King	Labor	1946	1931–1960
Frederick Kneeshaw	United Australia	1949	1934–1949
Hugh Latimer	United Australia	1949	1934–1955
Edward Magrath	Labor	1943	1925–1943
Robert Mahony	Labor	1943	1921–1961
Jim Maloney (Note: Frank Wall (United Australia) died on 1 April 1941. Jim Maloney (Labor) was elected as his replacement on 13 August 1941.)	Labor	1943	1941–1972
Marsden Manfred	United Australia	1949	1934–1949
Sir Henry Manning	United Australia	1946	1932–1958
John Martin	Labor	1946	1931–1946
Patrick McGirr	Labor	1943	1921–1955
Alan McNamara	Labor	1949	1931–1934, 1937–1955
Ernest Mitchell (Note: Ernest Mitchell (United Australia) died on 21 April 1943, the day this term concluded. The vacancy carried over to the next parliament.)	United Australia	1949	1934–1943
Henry Moulder	Country	1946	1932–1946
George Mullins	Labor	1952	1931–1948
Thomas Murray	Independent	1946	1921–1958
John O'Regan	Labor / Labor	1943	1921–1940
Stanley Parry	Independent	1952	1940–1952
Sir John Peden	United Australia	1946	1917–1946
Thomas Playfair	United Australia	1943	1927–1966
Graham Pratten	United Australia	1952	1937–1976
William Robson	United Australia	1943	1920–1951
James Ryan	United Australia	1949	1917–1940
Mick Ryan	Labor / Labor	1943	1925–1943
Ernest Sommerlad	Country	1943	1932–1952
Edmond Speck (Note: Sir Allen Taylor (United Australia) died on 30 September 1940. Edmond Speck (United Australia) was elected as his replacement on 19 November 1940.)	United Australia	1952	1940–1952
Frank Spicer	Labor / Independent	1949	1925–1973
Thomas Steele	Country	1949	1934–1961
John Stewart	Labor	1943	1941–1957
Colin Tannock	Labor	1952	1931–1952
Sir Allen Taylor	United Australia	1952	1912–1940
Henry Thompson	United Australia	1952	1940–1964
John Tonkin (Note: The seat of Theodore Trautwein (Independent) was declared vacant on 16 April 1940 following his conviction for making false representations. John Tonkin (United Australia) was elected as his replacement on 8 October 1940.)	United Australia	1946	1940–1946
Sir Frederick Tout	Country	1946	1932–1946
Thomas Tyrrell	Labor	1943	1925–1942
Sir Graham Waddell	Country	1949	1937–1949
Sir Samuel Walder	United Australia	1943	1932–1943
Frank Wall	United Australia	1943	1917–1941
Horace Whiddon	United Australia	1943	1934–1955
Hugh Wragge	Country	1949	1932–1949

== See also ==
- Mair ministry
- First McKell ministry
