= Members of the New South Wales Legislative Council, 1943–1946 =

Members of the New South Wales Legislative Council between 1943 and 1946 were indirectly elected by a joint sitting of the New South Wales Parliament, with 15 members elected every three years. The most recent election was on 18 December 1942, with the term of new members commencing on 23 April 1943. The President was Sir John Peden.

| Name | Party | End term | Years in office |
|---|---|---|---|
| Alexander Alam | Labor | 1946 | 1925–1958, 1963–1973 |
| George Archer | Labor | 1949 | 1925–1949 |
| Thomas Armstrong | United Australia / Democratic / Liberal | 1949 | 1935–1955 |
| George Bassett | Country | 1952 | 1932–1964 |
| Alfred Binks | United Australia / Democratic / Liberal | 1952 | 1932–1952 |
| William Bradley | United Australia / Democratic / Liberal | 1949 | 1940–1949 |
| Keith Brooks | United Australia / Democratic / Liberal | 1946 | 1939–1946 |
| Walter Cambridge | Country | 1946 | 1932–1946 |
| Hector Clayton | Independent | 1949 | 1937–1973 |
| Joseph Coates (Note: Joseph Coates (Labor) died on 4 May 1943. Charles Hackett (Labor) was elected as his replacements on 20 August 1943.) | Labor / Labor | 1952 | 1921–1943 |
| Arthur Colvin | United Australia / Democratic / Liberal | 1955 | 1932–1955 |
| James Concannon | Labor | 1946 | 1925–1958 |
| John Culbert (Note: John Culbert (Labor) died on 19 August 1943. William Gibb (Labor) was elected as his replacement on 3 November 1943.) | Labor | 1949 | 1925–1943 |
| Chris Dalton (Note: Edward Grayndler (Labor) died on 12 March 1943, before the beginning of this term. Chris Dalton (Labor) was elected as his replacement on 20 July 1943.) | Labor | 1946 | 1943–1970 |
| William Dickson | Labor | 1952 | 1925–1934, 1940–1966 |
| Reg Downing | Labor | 1952 | 1940–1972 |
| Jim Eggins | Country | 1952 | 1940–1949 |
| Ernest Farrar | United Australia / Democratic / Liberal | 1946 | 1912–1952 |
| John Ferguson (Note: Thomas Holden (Liberal) resigned on 10 October 1945. John Ferguson (Labor) was elected as his replacement on 7 November 1945.) | Labor | 1952 | 1945–1952 |
| William Gibb | Labor | 1949 | 1931–1934, 1943–1952 |
| James Graves | Labor | 1949 | 1934–1961 |
| Charles Hackett | Labor | 1952 | 1943–1964 |
| Eli Harrison | Labor | 1955 | 1943–1949 |
| Herbert Henley | Country | 1952 | 1937–1964 |
| Thomas Holden | United Australia / Democratic / Liberal | 1952 | 1934–1945 |
| Henry Horne | United Australia / Democratic / Liberal | 1946 | 1917–1955 |
| Sir Archibald Howie (Note: Sir Archibald Howie (United Australia) died on 26 October 1943. Samuel Williams (Labor) was elected as his replacement on 9 December 1943.) | United Australia / Democratic / Liberal | 1952 | 1934–1943 |
| Sir Norman Kater | Country | 1955 | 1923–1955 |
| Francis Kelly | Labor | 1955 | 1942–1947 |
| Robert King | Labor | 1946 | 1931–1960 |
| Frederick Kneeshaw | United Australia / Democratic / Liberal | 1949 | 1934–1949 |
| Hugh Latimer | United Australia / Democratic / Liberal | 1949 | 1934–1955 |
| Robert Mahony | Labor | 1955 | 1921–1961 |
| Jim Maloney | Labor | 1955 | 1941–1972 |
| Marsden Manfred | United Australia / Democratic / Liberal | 1949 | 1934–1949 |
| Sir Henry Manning | United Australia / Democratic / Liberal | 1946 | 1932–1958 |
| John Martin | Labor | 1946 | 1931–1946 |
| Patrick McGirr | Labor | 1955 | 1921–1955 |
| Alan McNamara | Labor | 1949 | 1931–1934, 1937–1955 |
| Henry Moulder | Country | 1946 | 1932–1946 |
| George Mullins | Labor | 1952 | 1931–1948 |
| Thomas Murray | Independent | 1946 | 1921–1958 |
| Ernest O'Dea | Labor | 1955 | 1943–1967 |
| Stanley Parry | Independent | 1952 | 1940–1952 |
| Sir John Peden | United Australia / Democratic / Liberal | 1946 | 1917–1946 |
| Thomas Playfair | United Australia / Democratic / Liberal | 1955 | 1927–1966 |
| Graham Pratten | United Australia / Democratic / Liberal | 1952 | 1937–1976 |
| William Robson | United Australia / Democratic / Liberal | 1955 | 1920–1951 |
| Robert Savage (Note: Ernest Mitchell (United Australia) died on 21 April 1943, the day before this term began. Robert Savage (Labor) was elected as his replacement on 20 August 1943.) | Labor | 1949 | 1931–1934, 1943–1959 |
| Leon Snider | United Australia / Democratic / Liberal | 1955 | 1943–1965 |
| Ernest Sommerlad | Country | 1955 | 1932–1952 |
| Edmond Speck | United Australia / Democratic / Liberal | 1952 | 1940–1952 |
| Frank Spicer | Labor / Independent | 1949 | 1925–1973 |
| Thomas Steele | Country | 1949 | 1934–1961 |
| John Stewart | Labor | 1955 | 1941–1957 |
| Colin Tannock | Labor | 1952 | 1931–1952 |
| Henry Thompson | United Australia / Democratic / Liberal | 1952 | 1940–1964 |
| John Tonkin | United Australia / Democratic / Liberal | 1946 | 1940–1946 |
| Sir Frederick Tout | Country | 1946 | 1932–1946 |
| Sir Graham Waddell | Country | 1949 | 1937–1949 |
| Horace Whiddon | United Australia / Democratic / Liberal | 1955 | 1934–1955 |
| Samuel Williams | Labor | 1952 | 1943–1962 |
| Hugh Wragge | Country | 1949 | 1932–1949 |
| Ernest Wright | Labor | 1955 | 1943–1973 |

== See also ==
- First McKell ministry
- Second McKell ministry
