= Members of the New South Wales Legislative Council, 1937–1940 =

Members of the New South Wales Legislative Council were mostly elected at the 1933 election. A further 15 were elected by a joint sitting of the New South Wales Parliament in December 1936. The President was Sir John Peden.

Name	Party	End term	Years in office
Alexander Alam	Labor	1946	1925–1958, 1963–1973
George Archer	Labor	1949	1925–1949
Thomas Armstrong	United Australia	1949	1935–1955
George Bassett	Country	1940	1932–1964
Alfred Binks	United Australia	1940	1932–1952
Sir Henry Braddon	United Australia	1940	1917–1940
Keith Brooks (Note: Herbert Hawkins (United Australia) died on 16 June 1939. Keith Brooks (United Australia) was elected to replace him on 8 August 1939.)	United Australia	1946	1939–1946
Walter Cambridge	Country	1946	1932–1946
Hector Clayton	Independent	1949	1937–1973
Joseph Coates	Labor	1940	1921–1943
Arthur Colvin	United Australia	1943	1932–1955
James Concannon	Labor	1946	1925–1958
John Culbert	Labor	1949	1925–1943
Maxwell Dunlop	Country	1943	1932–1941
Ernest Farrar	United Australia	1946	1912–1952
Donald Grant	Labor	1940	1931–1940
James Graves	Labor	1949	1934–1961
Edward Grayndler	Labor	1946	1921–1934, 1936–1943
Herbert Hawkins	United Australia	1946	1932–1939
Herbert Henley (Note: Sir Arthur Trethowan (Country) died on 26 November 1937. Herbert Henley (Country) was elected to replace him on 17 December 1937.)	Country	1940	1937–1964
Thomas Holden	United Australia	1940	1934–1945
Henry Horne	United Australia	1946	1917–1955
Archibald Howie	United Australia	1940	1934–1943
Sir Norman Kater	Country	1943	1923–1955
Robert King	Industrial Labor / Labor	1946	1931–1960
Frederick Kneeshaw	United Australia	1949	1934–1949
Hugh Latimer	United Australia	1949	1934–1955
Edward Magrath	Labor	1943	1925–1943
Robert Mahony	Labor	1943	1921–1961
Marsden Manfred	United Australia	1949	1934–1949
Sir Henry Manning	United Australia	1946	1932–1958
John Martin	Labor	1946	1931–1946
Patrick McGirr	Labor	1943	1921–1955
Alan McNamara	Labor	1949	1931–1934, 1937–1955
Ernest Mitchell	United Australia	1949	1934–1943
Henry Moulder	Country	1946	1932–1946
George Mullins	Labor	1940	1931–1948
Thomas Murray	Independent	1946	1921–1958
George Nesbitt	Country	1940	1927–1940
Broughton O'Conor	United Australia	1940	1908–1940
John O'Regan	Labor	1943	1921–1940
Sir John Peden	United Australia	1946	1917–1946
Thomas Playfair	United Australia	1943	1927–1966
Graham Pratten (Note: Sir Charles Rosenthal (United Australia) resigned on 28 October 1937. Graham Pratten was elected to replace him on 16 December 1937.)	United Australia	1940	1937–1976
William Robson	United Australia	1943	1920–1951
Sir Charles Rosenthal	United Australia	1940	1936–1937
James Ryan	United Australia	1949	1917–1940
Mick Ryan	Labor	1943	1925–1943
Samuel Smith	Labor	1940	1931–1940
Ernest Sommerlad	Country	1943	1932–1952
Frank Spicer	Independent	1949	1925–1973
Thomas Steele	Country	1949	1934–1961
Colin Tannock	Labor	1940	1931–1952
Sir Allen Taylor	United Australia	1940	1912–1940
Sir Frederick Tout	Country	1946	1932–1946
Theodore Trautwein (Note: The seat of Theodore Trautwein (Independent) was declared vacant on 16 April 1940 following his conviction for making false representations. The vacancy carried over to the next parliament.)	Independent	1946	1934–1940
Sir Arthur Trethowan	Country	1940	1916–1937
Thomas Tyrrell	Labor	1943	1925–1942
Sir Graham Waddell	Country	1949	1937–1949
Sir Samuel Walder	United Australia	1943	1932–1943
Frank Wall	United Australia	1943	1917–1941
Horace Whiddon	United Australia	1943	1934–1955
Hugh Wragge	Country	1949	1932–1949

== See also ==
- Second Stevens Ministry
- Third Stevens ministry
