= Members of the New South Wales Legislative Council, 1934–1937 =

Members of the New South Wales Legislative Council who served between April 1934 and April 1937 were elected in 1933 or at a by-election. Prior to 1934 members had been appointed for life by the Governor on the advice of the Executive Council. This was the first occasion in which members had been elected, not directly by the people, but by a joint sitting of the New South Wales Parliament with members having a 12 year term. Being the first election, the members were elected in four groups of 15 members, for terms ending in 1937, 1940, 1943 and 1946. The President was Sir John Peden.

Name	Party	End term	Years in office
Alexander Alam	Labor (NSW) / Labor	1946	1925–1958, 1963–1973
George Archer	Labor (NSW) / Labor	1937	1925–1949
Thomas Armstrong (Note: Harold Nicholas (United Australia) resigned on 4 January 1935. Thomas Armstrong (United Australia) was elected on 26 February 1935 for the balance of the 3 year term.)	United Australia	1937	1935–1955
George Bassett	Country	1940	1932–1964
Alfred Binks	United Australia	1940	1932–1952
Sir Henry Braddon	United Australia	1940	1917–1940
Charles Bridges	Labor (NSW) / Labor	1937	1925–1937, 1940–1943
Walter Cambridge	Country	1946	1932–1946
Joseph Coates	Federal Labor / Labor	1940	1921–1943
Edward Collins (Note: Daniel Rees (Labor (NSW)) died on 19 June 1934. Edward Collins (United Australia) was elected on 9 August 1934 for the balance of the 6 year term.) (Note: Edward Collins (United Australia) died on 8 April 1936. Sir Charles Rosenthal (United Australia) was elected on 3 June 1936 for the balance of the 6 year term.)	United Australia	1940	1932–1934, 1934–1936
Arthur Colvin	United Australia	1943	1932–1955
James Concannon	Labor (NSW) / Labor	1946	1925–1958
Lionel Courtenay (Note: Lionel Courtenay (United Australia) resigned on 8 August 1934. Horace Whiddon (United Australia) was elected on 27 September 1934 for the balance of the 9 year term.)	United Australia	1943	1932–1934
John Culbert	Labor (NSW) / Labor	1937	1925–1943
Maxwell Dunlop	Country	1943	1932–1941
Ernest Farrar	United Australia	1946	1912–1952
Joseph Gardiner	Independent	1937	1934–1937
Donald Grant	Labor (NSW) / Labor	1940	1931–1940
James Graves	Labor (NSW) / Labor	1937	1934–1961
Edward Grayndler (Note: John Higgins (Labor) died on 28 July 1936. Edward Grayndler (Labor) was elected on 10 November 1936 for the balance of the 12 year term.)	Labor	1946	1921–1934, 1936–1943
Herbert Hawkins	United Australia	1946	1932–1939
Alfred Hemsley	United Australia	1937	1927–1937
John Higgins	Federal Labor / Labor	1946	1921–1936
Thomas Holden	United Australia	1940	1934–1945
Henry Horne	United Australia	1946	1917–1955
Archibald Howie	United Australia	1940	1934–1943
Sir Norman Kater	Country	1943	1923–1955
Robert King	Labor (NSW) / Industrial Labor	1946	1931–1960
Frederick Kneeshaw	United Australia	1937	1934–1949
Hugh Latimer	United Australia	1937	1934–1955
Edward Magrath	Labor (NSW) / Labor	1943	1925–1943
Robert Mahony	Labor (NSW) / Labor	1943	1921–1961
Marsden Manfred	United Australia	1937	1934–1949
Henry Manning	United Australia	1946	1932–1958
John Martin	Labor (NSW) / Labor	1946	1931–1946
Patrick McGirr	Labor (NSW) / Labor	1943	1921–1955
Ernest Mitchell	United Australia	1934	1934–1943
Henry Moulder	Country	1946	1932–1946
George Mullins	Labor (NSW) / Labor	1940	1931–1948
Thomas Murray	Independent	1946	1921–1958
George Nesbitt	Country	1940	1927–1940
Harold Nicholas	United Australia	1937	1932–1935
Broughton O'Conor	United Australia	1940	1908–1940
John O'Regan	Federal Labor / Labor	1943	1921–1940
Sir John Peden	United Australia	1946	1917–1946
Thomas Playfair	United Australia	1943	1927–1966
Daniel Rees	Labor (NSW) / Labor	1940	1931–1934
William Robson	United Australia	1943	1920–1951
Sir Charles Rosenthal	United Australia	1940	1936–1937
James Ryan	United Australia	1937	1917–1940
Mick Ryan	Federal Labor / Labor	1943	1925–1943
Samuel Smith	Labor (NSW) / Labor	1940	1931–1940
Ernest Sommerlad	Country	1943	1932–1952
Frank Spicer	Federal Labor / Independent	1937	1925–1973
Thomas Steele	Country	1937	1934–1961
Colin Tannock	Labor (NSW) / Labor	1940	1931–1952
Sir Allen Taylor	United Australia	1940	1912–1940
Sir Frederick Tout	Country	1946	1932–1946
Theodore Trautwein	Independent	1946	1934–1940
Sir Arthur Trethowan	Country	1940	1916–1937
Thomas Tyrrell	Labor (NSW) / Labor	1943	1925–1942
Sir Samuel Walder	United Australia	1943	1932–1943
Frank Wall	United Australia	1943	1917–1941
Horace Whiddon	United Australia	1943	1934–1955
Hugh Wragge	Country	1937	1932–1949

== See also ==
- First Stevens ministry
- Second Stevens Ministry
