= Members of the New South Wales Legislative Council, 1946–1949 =

Members of the New South Wales Legislative Council between 1946 and 1943 were indirectly elected by a joint sitting of the New South Wales Parliament, with 15 members elected every three years. The most recent election was in March 1946, with the term of new members commencing on 23 April 1946. The President was Ernest Farrar.

Name	Party	End term	Years in office
Alexander Alam	Labor	1958	1925–1958, 1963–1973
George Archer	Labor	1949	1925–1949
Thomas Armstrong	Liberal	1949	1935–1955
George Bassett	Country	1952	1932–1964
Alfred Binks	Liberal	1952	1932–1952
Joseph Bodkin	Labor	1958	1946–1950
William Bradley	Liberal	1949	1940–1949
Arthur Bridges	Liberal	1958	1946–1968
Francis Buckley	Labor	1958	1946–1954
Harry Budd	Country	1958	1946–1978
Hector Clayton	Independent	1949	1937–1973
Arthur Colvin	Liberal	1955	1932–1955
James Concannon	Labor	1958	1925–1958
William Coulter (Note: Francis Kelly (Labor) resigned on 15 October 1947. William Coulter (Labor) was elected to replace him on 11 November 1947.)	Labor	1955	1947–1978
Chris Dalton	Labor	1958	1943–1970
William Dickson	Labor	1952	1925–1934, 1940–1966
Reg Downing	Labor	1952	1940–1972
Jim Eggins	Country	1952	1940–1949
Otway Falkiner	Country	1958	1946–1978
Ernest Farrar	Liberal	1958	1912–1952
John Ferguson	Labor	1952	1945–1952
William Gibb	Labor	1949	1931–1934, 1943–1952
Thomas Gleeson	Labor	1958	1946–1975
James Graves	Labor	1949	1934–1961
Charles Hackett	Labor	1952	1943–1964
Eli Harrison	Labor	1955	1943–1949
Herbert Henley	Country	1952	1937–1964
Henry Horne	Liberal	1958	1917–1955
Sir Norman Kater	Country	1955	1923–1955
Francis Kelly	Labor	1955	1942–1947
Jim Kenny (Note: George Mullins (Labor) died on 5 July 1948. Jim Kenny (Labor) was elected to replace him on 12 August 1948.)	Labor	1952	1948–1967
Robert King	Labor	1958	1931–1960
Frederick Kneeshaw	Liberal	1949	1934–1949
Hugh Latimer	Liberal	1949	1934–1955
Robert Mahony	Labor	1955	1921–1961
Jim Maloney	Labor	1955	1941–1972
Marsden Manfred	Liberal	1949	1934–1949
Sir Henry Manning	Liberal	1958	1932–1958
Patrick McGirr	Labor	1955	1921–1955
Alan McNamara	Labor	1949	1931–1934, 1937–1955
George Mullins	Labor	1952	1931–1948
Thomas Murray	Independent	1958	1921–1958
Ernest O'Dea	Labor	1955	1943–1967
Walter Padgen	Labor	1958	1946–1955
Stanley Parry	Independent	1952	1940–1952
Thomas Playfair	Liberal	1955	1927–1966
Graham Pratten	Liberal	1952	1937–1976
William Robson	Liberal	1955	1920–1951
Robert Savage	Labor	1949	1931–1934, 1943–1959
Leon Snider	Liberal	1955	1943–1965
Ernest Sommerlad	Country	1955	1932–1952
Edmond Speck	Liberal	1952	1940–1952
Frank Spicer	Independent	1949	1925–1973
Thomas Steele	Country	1949	1934–1961
John Stewart	Labor	1955	1941–1957
Colin Tannock	Labor	1952	1931–1952
Henry Thompson	Liberal	1952	1940–1964
Sir Graham Waddell	Country	1949	1937–1949
Horace Whiddon	Liberal	1955	1934–1955
Samuel Williams	Labor	1952	1943–1962
Hugh Wragge	Country	1949	1932–1949
Ernest Wright	Labor	1955	1943–1973

== See also ==
- Second McKell ministry
- First McGirr ministry
- Second McGirr ministry
