= List of acts of the Parliament of New South Wales =

This is an incomplete list of acts of the Parliament of New South Wales.

== 19th century ==
=== 1820-1829 ===
- List of acts of the Parliament of New South Wales from 1824
- List of acts of the Parliament of New South Wales from 1825
- List of acts of the Parliament of New South Wales from 1826
- List of acts of the Parliament of New South Wales from 1827
- List of acts of the Parliament of New South Wales from 1828
- List of acts of the Parliament of New South Wales from 1829

== See also ==
- Legislative Council of New South Wales
- Parliament of New South Wales
