= Pastoralists' Union of New South Wales =

The Pastoralists' Union of New South Wales was an association of landholders in Australia founded in 1890. In 1916 it was renamed Graziers' Association of New South Wales, one of the founders of the Progressive Party of New South Wales, which later became New South Wales National Party. In 1978, the Graziers' Association merged with the United Farmers' and Woolgrowers' Industrial Association of New South Wales to form the Livestock and Grain Producers Association of New South Wales (LGPA NSW), which in January 1987 changed its name to the NSW Farmers Association.

== History ==
The Pastoralists' Union of New South Wales was formed in 1890 in response to the statement or threat by the Amalgamated Shearers' Union of Australasia (ASU) that it would take steps to prevent non-Union-sheared wool from being exported.

The name of the organisation was changed as of 1 October 1916 to Graziers' Association of New South Wales to avoid the connotation of pastoralists as large wealthy landholders defending their position of power and privilege, when in fact many were modest farmers. The Graziers' Association was one of the founders of the Progressive Party of New South Wales, which became New South Wales National Party.

=== 1978 merger ===
In 1978, the United Farmers' and Woolgrowers' Industrial Association of New South Wales merged with the Graziers' Association to form the Livestock and Grain Producers Association of New South Wales (LGPA NSW), which in January 1987 changed its name to the NSW Farmers Association, which still exists today (2024).

== People ==
=== Secretaries ===
- Whitely King, 1890–1901
- John Mair secretary 1902–1915
- James William Allen secretary 1914–1946; became full-time secretary of Graziers' Federal Council of Australia in 1946–1952.

=== Presidents ===
- G. H. Cox 1891–1892
- Alexander Wilson 1891
- W. E. Abbott 1894–1897
- A. A. Dangar 1898–1899
- W. E. Abbott 1900–1910
- Philip Oakden (1840–1916) 1911–1916
- W. F. Jaques 1916–1918
- John Mackay ( –1949) 1918–1921
- A. E. Hunt 1921–1922
- Norman W. Kater 1922–1925
- Sir Graham Waddell 1926–1927
- Sir Frederick H. Tout 1928–1933
- James Walker 1933–1935
- J. P. Abbott 1935–1939
- E. L. Killen 1939–1942
- H. R. Cowdery 1942–1944
- E. L. Killen 1944–1946
- P. A. Wright 1946–1949
- C. M. Williams 1949–1952
- T. G. Carter 1952–
