= George Mullins =

George Mullins may refer to:

- George Mullins (painter) (fl. 1763–1775), Irish landscape painter
- George Mullins (politician) (1879–1948), Australian politician
- George Mullins (rugby league) (1907–1995), Australian rugby league player and coach

== See also ==
- George Mullin (disambiguation)
