= Keith Brooks =

Keith Brooks may refer to:

- Keith Brooks (footballer) (1917–1981), Australian rules footballer
- Keith Brooks (Australian politician) (1888–1955)
- Keith Brooks (American politician), member of the Arkansas House of Representatives
- Keith Brooks, CEO of TBI plc
