= John O'Regan =

John O'Regan may refer to:

- Diamond Rings (musician) (born 1985), Canadian artist and musician with this name
- John O'Regan (politician) (1877–1940), Australian politician
- John O'Regan, Irish producer credited with Reeling In the Years
