= Norman Nock =

Australian businessman and politician

Sir Norman Nock
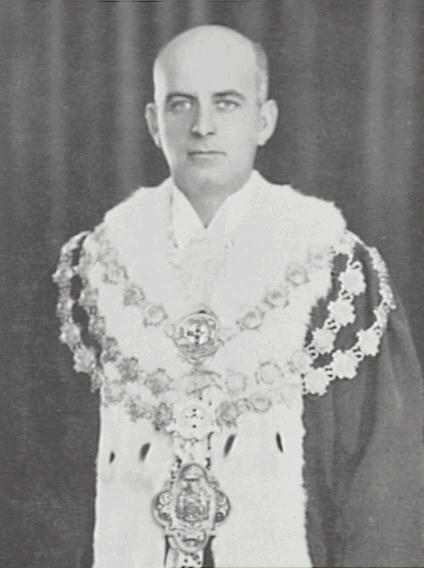
- Norman Lindfield Nock (1938)

63rd Lord Mayor of Sydney
- In office 1 January 1938 – 31 December 1939
- Preceded by: Archibald Howie
- Succeeded by: Stanley Crick

Alderman of the City of Sydney
- In office 3 December 1934 – 5 December 1941
- Constituency: Gipps Ward

Personal details
- Born: 11 April 1899 Lindfield, New South Wales, Australia
- Died: 24 June 1990 (aged 91) Kincumber, New South Wales, Australia
- Spouse(s): Ethel Evelyna Bradford (m. 1927–1990; his death)
- Children: Graham Nock
- Parent: Thomas Nock

Sir Norman Lindfield Nock (11 April 1899 – 24 June 1990) was an Australian businessman and politician. Nock was Chairman and managing director of the family hardware retail firm, Nock & Kirby, from 1925 to 1979, and was an Alderman of the City of Sydney, rising to become Lord Mayor for two terms in 1938 and 1939.

== Early life and career ==
Norman Lindfield Nock was born on 11 April 1899 in Lindfield, New South Wales, as the youngest child of Thomas Nock and Eliza Jane Simmonds. After receiving his education at Sydney Church of England Grammar School, at age 18 he joined the staff of Farmer & Company's department store in Pitt Street, Sydney. After being rejected for war service on medical grounds, Nock travelled to England in 1919 and worked at Selfridges in London, and later at John Wanamaker & Co in New York. Returning to Australia, Nock joined the family firm of Nock & Kirby, which his father had established in 1894 with Herbert Kirby, and left Australia again in 1923 to establish a branch of the company in London.

Nock returned to Sydney in 1925 to take up the post of managing director of Nock & Kirby on the sudden death of his brother, Harold Thomas Nock. Nock undertook an expansion of the business and in 1933 opened a prominent new main store in George Street. On 22 October 1927, he married Ethel Evelyna Bradford at St Philip's Church, Sydney. A member of the Retail Traders' Association of New South Wales since 1930, Nock was elected president in 1932.

== Political career ==
This notability assisted when he joined the conservative Civic Reform Association, and was elected as an alderman for Gipps Ward of the City of Sydney at the 1934 election.

In December 1937, when Archibald Howie declined to run for a third term as Lord Mayor, Nock was endorsed by the Civic Reform majority to succeed him for the 1938 term, and was subsequently elected unanimously, with the unusual concurrence of all Labor Party aldermen. As Lord Mayor, Nock caused a degree of controversy when he agreed in June 1938 to make Sydney Town Hall available for a lecture series by Felix von Luckner, a German naval officer and yachtsman, who had links to the Nazi Party. Nock defended his permission on the basis that he understood that the lectures were not of a "political nature".

Nock stood for a second term as Lord Mayor in December 1938 and, in a reflection of his appeal across party divisions, was again elected unanimously with the dual nominations from the Civic Reform and Labor aldermen, which was described as a first for the City of Sydney. Described as having "gained the friendship and esteem of all members of the council" and "very popular in business and State political circles", Nock was knighted in the 1939 Birthday Honours, which was conferred by the Governor-General of Australia, Lord Gowrie.

As mayor on the outbreak of the Second World War in 1939, Nock declared to the 1939 congress of the RSL that "We must fight desperately for what we believe to be democracy. We must do what our forefathers did and what you gentlemen have done." Nock later served as chairman of the Lord Mayor's Patriotic and War Fund. Although initially considering a third term as Lord Mayor, Nock decided to follow his Civic Reform party and support the candidacy of Stanley Crick for the 1940 term. In October 1941 Nock informed his colleagues that he would not be standing for re-election as an alderman at the December 1941 election.

== Later life ==
In April 1940, Nock was appointed as a director of the board of the Royal North Shore Hospital and was later elected as chairman of the board, serving until his retirement in 1969. He also served as a director of David Jones, with Charles Lloyd Jones praising his appointment because of his "close knowledge of the retail trade". In December 1944, Lloyd Jones stood down as Managing Director of David Jones and Nock succeeded him for a period of fifteen months.

Nock also served as member of the National Health and Medical Research Council from 1946 to 1969, president (1954–1969) of the NRMA, and a director of Qantas Empire Airways (1961–1966).

Nock oversaw the regional expansion of Nock & Kirby, with several new stores in suburban and regional locations opening throughout the 1960s. In 1973, Nock retired as managing director of the family firm, with his son, Graham, succeeding him. Nock nevertheless continued in the firm as chairman of the board until 1979. Graham Nock also served as an Alderman of the City of Sydney for Gipps Ward between 1962 and 1967.

Survived by his wife and son, Nock died on 24 June 1990 at Kincumber and was cremated. A lecture theatre at Royal North Shore Hospital was named after him in honour of his role at the hospital and its status as a teaching hospital.

Business positions
Preceded by Harold Thomas Nock	Managing Director of Nock & Kirby; 1925 – 1973	Succeeded by Graham Nock
Civic offices
Preceded by Archibald Howie	Lord Mayor of Sydney; 1938 – 1939	Succeeded by Stanley Crick
Medical appointments
Preceded by A. H. Hirst	Chairman of the Royal North Shore Hospital; 1940 – 1968	Succeeded by Bob Hynes
Non-profit organization positions
Preceded by C. R. Davidson	President of the NRMA; 1954 – 1969	Succeeded by Reginald Edward Ludowici
