= Charles Waddell =

Charles Waddell may refer to:

- Sir Charles Graham Waddell (1877–1960), Australian politician
- Charles L. Waddell (1932–2022), American politician
