= Farmers' and Settlers' Association of New South Wales =

The Farmers' and Settlers' Association of New South Wales (F&S) was an umbrella organisation of farmers' and selectors' associations in New South Wales, founded in 1893. In August 1961, United Farmers' and Woolgrowers' Association of New South Wales was formed when F&S recombined with the Wool and Wheat Growers' Association, which had split off in 1930. After further mergers, the United Farmers' and Woolgrowers' Industrial Association of New South Wales was formed in 1969.

In 1978, the United Farmers' and Woolgrowers' Association merged with the Graziers' Association of New South Wales to form the Livestock and Grain Producers Association of New South Wales (LGPA NSW). In January 1987, the LGPA changed its name to the NSW Farmers Association (usually referred to simply as NSW Farmers).

== History ==
The association was formed in 1893 as the outcome of a conference held in Cootamundra, which adopted the Name and Constitution as published in the Cootamundra Herald. It was, at least in part, a reaction to the successes achieved by the Pastoralists' Union of New South Wales, who had just come from a crushing defeat of the Shearers' Union. They had succeeded in lobbying for their interests as large landholders, often against the farmers' interests.

The foundation president was G. F. Plunkett (c. 1847–1902) and the secretary M. M. Ryan, (c. 1859 – 21 August 1919), who acted as delegates to the land conference held at Cootamundra, their appointments ratified, along with the election of W. Walsh as treasurer.

The first annual conference of delegates from subscribing farmers' unions was held in Young a year later, on 25 July 1894. They resolved that Government should release more land for farming, but with the proviso, to prevent further land-grabbing by wealthy pastoralists, that successful selectors must live on their claims. It also called for extension of the railways into the new areas, also the establishment of a State Bank. In its early years much debate centred on the competing fiscal philosophies: protectionism v. free trade, the free-traders generally having the upper hand. Conversely perhaps, Federation was welcomed for freeing up interstate markets. The rabbit pest was a perennial topic. Following conferences included:

- Cootamundra 6 August 1895
- Wagga 11 August 1896
- Wagga 31 August 1897
- Bathurst 23 August 1898
- Orange 15 August 1899

(Hosting the conference in Bathurst and Orange stimulated interest there in farmers' unions, which had previously been lacking.)

- Sydney 5 July 1900
- Tamworth 10 July 1901
- Sydney 8 July 1902
- Dubbo 7 June 1904
- Sydney 8 August 1905

An indication of the political importance of the organisation may be judged by the attention paid to the conventions by the Press. The Sydney Morning Herald, which had paid scant attention to its existence, for its tenth annual convention devoted whole pages to each of the five days' deliberations. Sydney was again chosen as the venue as, while holding meetings at country centres resulted in new branches being formed, a central venue meant greater participation.

== Amalgamation and politics ==
In October 1919 the F&S joined with the Graziers' Association of New South Wales and the People's Party of Soldiers and Citizens to form the Progressive Party of New South Wales, later to become New South Wales National Party.

In the 1950s the F&S was vigilant in exposing the threat of Communism, and its infiltration into seemingly innocent organisations.

The Wool and Wheat Growers' Association and the F&S, which had split in 1930, recombined as the United Farmers' and Woolgrowers' Association of New South Wales in August 1961. In 1968, this association merged with the Australian Primary Producers' Union (NSW Division) and the Apple and Pear Growers' Association, and in 1969 the Vegetable Growers' Association joined them, forming the United Farmers' and Woolgrowers' Industrial Association of New South Wales.

In 1978, the United Farmers' and Woolgrowers' Association merged with the Graziers' Association of New South Wales to form the Livestock and Grain Producers Association of New South Wales (LGPA NSW). In January 1987, the LGPA changed its name to the NSW Farmers Association (usually referred to simply as NSW Farmers), which still exists today (2024).

== Some notable members ==
- A. E. Hunt, president 1914–1916
- A. K. Trethowan MLC held many positions, including president 1916–1920 and treasurer 1930–1937.
- W. W. Killen, co-founder and president 1920–1922
- Walter Corrie Cambridge (died 1954) was a long-serving (1925–1945) secretary, later with The Land.

== Newspaper ==
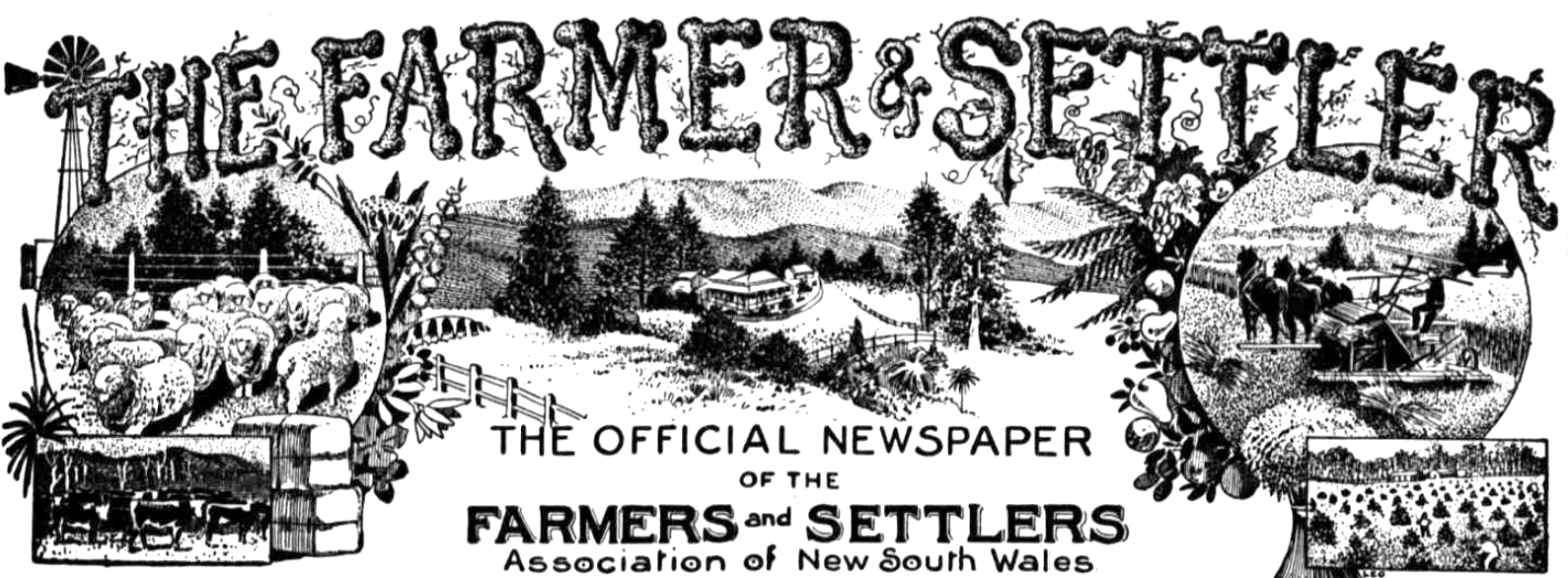

In 1906 the Association's executive authorised publication by The Farmer and Settler Publishing Company of 435 Kent Street, Sydney of a weekly newspaper, The Farmer & Settler, with T. I. Campbell, secretary of the Association, as editor. Campbell proved ineffectual in the position, and Harry J. Stephens was de facto editor from September 1906. In July 1907 a private company, the Farmers' and Settlers' Publishing Company Limited, with £20,000 in £1 shares, took over operation of the newspaper.

In 1909 the company sued Campbell for breach of contract, but lost the case because of irregularities in the contract, and the newspaper was driven to insolvency. Campbell remained general secretary of the F & S until retiring in 1925.

At the Association's 1910 convention the executive was authorised to again establish an official newspaper, and on 27 January 1911 the first issues of The Land were printed, to a barrage of criticism from the Farmer and Settler.
