= Hugh Latimer (disambiguation) =

Hugh Latimer was a leader of the English Reformation.

Hugh Latimer may also refer to:

- Hugh Latimer (actor) (1913–2006), English actor and toy maker
- Hugh Latimer (politician) (1896–1954), Australian politician

== See also ==
- Hugh Latimer Dryden (1898–1965), American aeronautical scientist and civil servant
