= Bob Hynes =

Australian cricketer

Personal information
- Full name: Lincoln Carruthers Hynes
- Born: 12 April 1912; Balmain, Sydney, Australia
- Died: 7 August 1977 (aged 65); Killara, Sydney, Australia
- Batting: Right-handed
- Bowling: Left-arm fast-medium

Domestic team information
- Years: Team
- 1935/36–1938/39: New South Wales

Career statistics
Competition	First-class
Matches	17
Runs scored	436
Batting average	17.44
100s/50s	0/2
Top score	63*
Balls bowled	3,003
Wickets	48
Bowling average	28.31
5 wickets in innings	1
10 wickets in match	0
Best bowling	6/25
Catches/stumpings	7/–
- Source: Cricinfo, 10 September 2023

Sir Lincoln Carruthers Hynes OBE (12 April 1912 – 7 August 1977), also known as L. C. Hynes or Bob Hynes, was an Australian cricketer, radio and television manager, and hospital administrator. He played seventeen first-class matches for New South Wales between 1935/36 and 1938/39. He was the chairman of Royal North Shore Hospital from 1968 to 1977. Sir Joseph Carruthers was his maternal great-uncle.

Medical appointments
Preceded by Sir Norman Nock	Chairman of the Royal North Shore Hospital; 1968 – 1977	Succeeded by James Benison Griffin
