= Alfred Hunt (politician) =

Australian politician

The Honourable Alfred Hunt MLC

Member of New South Wales Legislative Council
- In office 7 December 1916 – 16 August 1930

Personal details
- Born: 2 May 1861 Dural, New South Wales
- Died: 16 August 1930 (aged 69) Mosman, New South Wales
- Party: Progressive
- Spouse: Sarah Ruth (née Fletcher)
- Relations: Brother; John Hunt MLA; Brother-in-law; Charles Brunsdon Fletcher
- Children: 3 daughters and 5 sons
- Occupation: Grazier

Alfred Edgar Hunt (2 May 1861 – 16 August 1930), generally referred to as A. E. Hunt, was an Australian politician and a member of the New South Wales Legislative Council for 13 years.

== Early life ==
Hunt was born in Dural, New South Wales, the son of George Thomas Hunt, orchardist, and Elizabeth Williams. He attended Newington College whilst the school was situated at Newington House on the Parramatta River.

== Career ==
After school he selected land in the sheep district of Bogan Shire. He then owned Wyoming Station at Nevertire, New South Wales. In 1912 he became an executive member of the Farmers and Settlers Association, serving as president 1914–1916. He was elected president of the Graziers' Association of New South Wales in 1921, hailed as a democratization of what had been a reactionary organisation, referring to Hunt's service with the more grass-roots Farmers' and Settlers'.

For six years he was a member of the State Wool Committee and was elected president of the Australian Farmers Federal Organisation in 1930. He was president of New Settlers League from 1929 until 1930. He worked for the Far West Children's Health Scheme as honorary treasurer. Hunt was an active member of Methodist Church of Australasia serving on both NSW and Australian Conferences.
