= The Farmer & Settler =

Newspaper in Sydney, New South Wales, Australia

The Farmer & Settler was an English-language broadsheet newspaper published in Sydney, New South Wales, Australia, between 1906 and 1957. It was primarily published weekly.

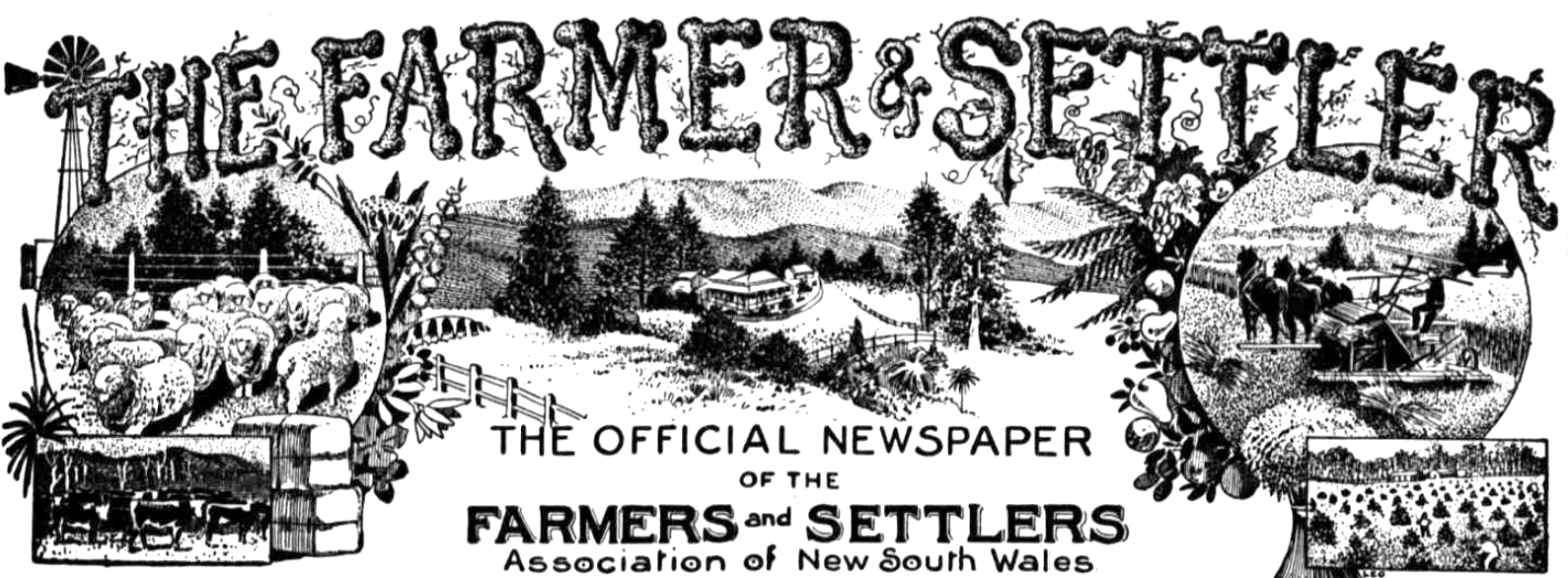

The banner of the first issues of the Farmer and Settler was subtitled "The Official Newspaper of the Farmers' and Settlers' Association of New South Wales", then from Volume II no. 1 of 8 February 1907 was far less ornate, with the motto "The Official Organ of the Farmers' and Settlers' Association of NSW", which in July 1910 became "The Voice of the Rural World", from 22 March 1918 "and Livestock Breeders' Journal"; from 30 January 1932 "Conducted by Uncle Wiseman"; (Note: "Uncle Wiseman", a pseudonym of Harry J. Stephens, first appeared in the issue of 23 August 1911, conducting a "Q&A" section.) then from 29 July 1937 "32nd Year of Publication" (updated each February).

== History ==
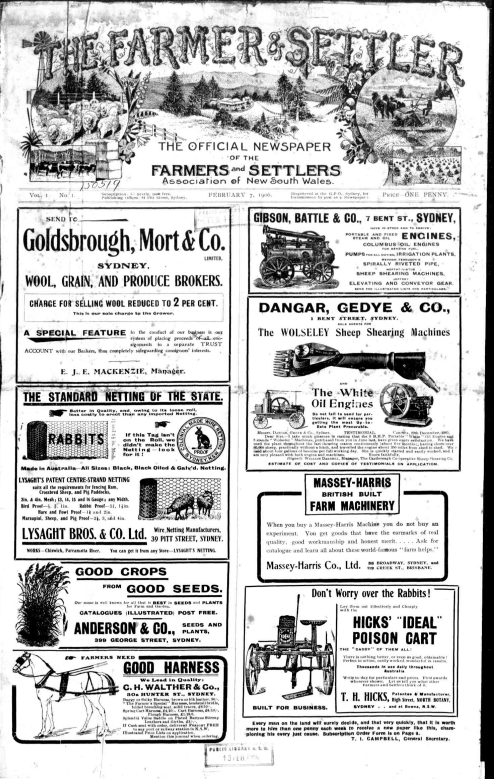
The Farmer & Settler, 7 February 1906

The first issue was published on 7 February 1906 as the official newspaper of the Farmers and Settlers Association of New South Wales". The first editor of the newspaper was the (then) secretary of the F&S Association, T. I. Campbell, with Charles White an associate editor. White was still so employed in December 1909, for most of that time under "senior sub-editor" Harry J. Stephens.

In July 1907 a new company Farmers' and Settlers' Publishers Limited was floated, with assets of £20,000 in £1 shares, to take over assets of the newspaper. The Farmers' and Settlers' Association could no longer rely on the newspaper to act as its voice, and in January 1911 the Association launched a new paper, The Land in competition.

In August 1911 the paper began publishing twice weekly, and this continued until shortly after the beginning of World War 1. From Monday 7 September 1914, the paper was published daily to report on "the war from day to day". In 1916, the newspaper gave Jean Williamson her first job. She ran the women's section of the paper.

In 1913 the newspaper was purchased by a consortium called Farmers' and Settlers' Newspaper Limited led by Percy C. White and Percy Marchant who, as Marchant & Co., had been printers for the paper since its inception. Other directors were Harry J. Stephens, George Morice (later manager and editor), and Thomas B. Wallace.

Claims of Charles White and Percy C. White having been editor and founder, respectively, of the Farmer & Settler in 1906 are mistaken, but may reflect its 1913 rebirth.

Jim Mahoney (died August 1962) was editor of F&S 1940–1953, joined The Land 1959.

== Digitisation ==
The paper has been digitised as part of the Australian Newspapers Digitisation Program of the National Library of Australia.

== See also ==
- List of newspapers in New South Wales
- List of newspapers in Australia
- List of defunct newspapers of Australia
