= Parliament of New South Wales =

Australian state legislature

Coordinates: 33.86739°S 151.21269°E

- 58th Parliament
- Coat of Arms of New South Wales

- New South Wales Parliament logo

Type
- Type: Bicameral
- Houses: Legislative Council; Legislative Assembly
- Sovereign: King (represented by the governor of New South Wales)

History
- Founded: 22 May 1856; 170 years ago
- New session started: 9 May 2023

Leadership
- Monarch: Charles III since 8 September 2022
- Governor: Margaret Beazley since 2 May 2019
- Speaker of the Legislative Assembly: Greg Piper, Independent since 9 May 2023
- President of the Legislative Council: Ben Franklin, Nationals since 9 May 2023
- Premier: Chris Minns, Labor since 28 March 2023
- Leader of the Opposition: Kellie Sloane, Liberal since 21 November 2025

Structure
- Seats: 135 (93 MLA, 42 MLC)
- Legislative Assembly political groups: Government (46): Labor (46); Opposition (35): Liberal (24); Nationals (11); Crossbench (12): Greens (3); Independent (9) (Note: Current independent MLAs: Roy Butler (Barwon), Helen Dalton (Murray), Philip Donato (Orange), Alex Greenwich (Sydney), Judy Hannan (Wollondilly), Joe McGirr (Wagga Wagga), Greg Piper (Lake Macquarie), Michael Regan (Wakehurst) and Jacqui Scruby (Pittwater))
- Legislative Council political groups: Government (15): Labor (15); Opposition (14): Liberal (9); National (5); Crossbench (13): Greens (4); Shooters, Fishers, Farmers (2); Animal Justice (1); Legalise Cannabis (1); Libertarians (1); Independent (4) (Note: Current independent MLCs: Mark Latham, Taylor Martin, Tania Mihailuk and Rod Roberts)

Elections
- Legislative Assembly voting system: Optional preferential voting
- Legislative Council voting system: Single transferable vote
- Last general election: 25 March 2023
- Next general election: 13 March 2027

Meeting place
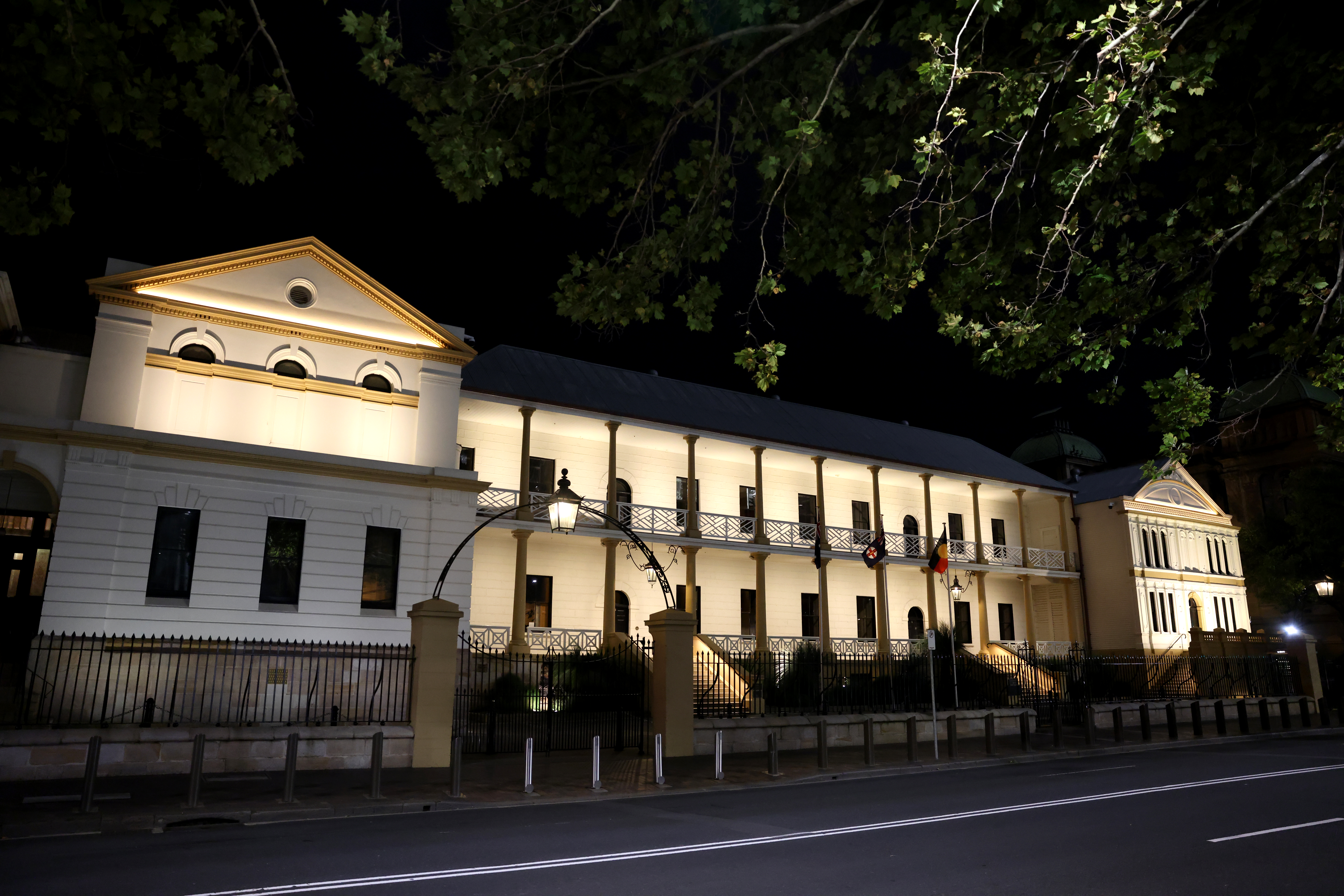
- Parliament House, Sydney, New South Wales, Australia

Website
- parliament.nsw.gov.au

Constitution
- Constitution Act 1902

The Parliament of New South Wales, formally the Legislature of New South Wales, is the bicameral legislative body of the Australian state of New South Wales (NSW). It consists of the Monarch, the New South Wales Legislative Assembly (lower house) and the New South Wales Legislative Council (upper house). Each house is directly elected by the people of New South Wales at elections held approximately every four years. The legislative authority of the parliament derives from section 5 of the Constitution Act 1902 (NSW). The power to make laws that apply to New South Wales is shared with the Federal (or Commonwealth) Parliament. The houses of the New South Wales Parliament follow the Westminster parliamentary traditions, green and red chamber colours and protocols for the Legislative Assembly and the Legislative Council, respectively. The houses of the legislature are located in Parliament House on Macquarie Street in Sydney.

== History ==
The Parliament of New South Wales was the first of the Australian colonial legislatures, with its formation in the 1850s. At the time, New South Wales was a British colony under the control of the Governor. A small, appointed Legislative Council began meeting in 1824 to advise the Governor on legislative matters. By 1843, this had been enlarged, with two-thirds of its members elected by adult males who met certain property requirements.

The opening of the first elected Legislative Council in 1843

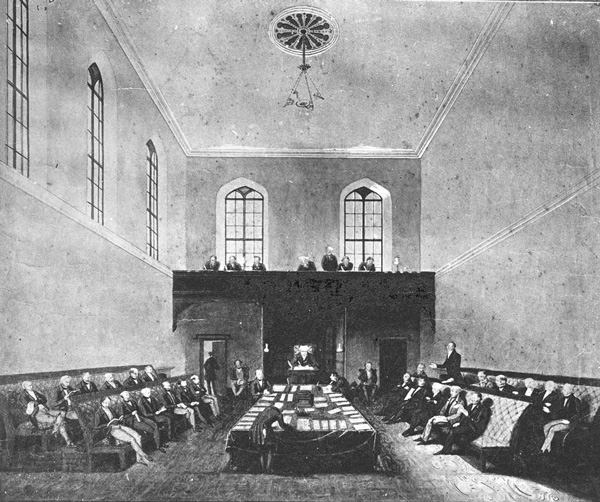
First meeting of the NSW Legislative Council in Parliament House, 1843 (chamber now the Legislative Assembly)

The Australian Constitutions Act 1850, passed by the Imperial Parliament, expanded the New South Wales Legislative Council so that by 1851 there were 54 members – again, with two-thirds elected. In 1853, a select committee chaired by William Charles Wentworth began drawing up a constitution for responsible self-government in the colony. While many of the provisions in the committee's proposed constitution were accepted when placed before the Legislative Council in August that year, a proposal to create a colonial nobility was subject to heavy criticism and later withdrawn.

The approved bicameral structure included a fully elected Legislative Assembly, as well as a Legislative Council whose members were appointed for life. A government assumed most of the Governor's legislative powers. The new constitution was sent to the Imperial Parliament and passed into law by the New South Wales Constitution Act 1855 on 16 July 1855. On 22 May 1856, the newly constituted New South Wales Parliament opened and sat for the first time. With the new 54-member Legislative Assembly taking over the Council chamber, a second meeting chamber for the 21-member upper house had to be added to the Parliament building on Macquarie Street.

The Electoral Act of 1858 made additional changes. The right to vote was extended to most males over 21 years of age. However, men "in the receipt of aid from any charitable institution" were ineligible. This was deemed to include all people living on Aboriginal stations and reserves. Other men not able to vote included those "of unsound mind", incarcerated individuals, and members of the military or the police.

In 1859 Queensland separated from New South Wales to form an independent colony. The Legislative Assembly was reduced from 80 to 72 members by the loss of the Queensland seats. In 1901, New South Wales became a state of the Commonwealth of Australia, and many government functions were transferred to the new Commonwealth government. In 1902, the current constitution of New South Wales was adopted.

Women gained the right to vote in Commonwealth elections in April 1902, and in New South Wales state elections in August 1902. In 1918, reforms permitted women to be members of Parliament, although no woman was elected until 1925 when Millicent Preston-Stanley was elected to represent the Eastern Suburbs. That same year, a proportional representation system was introduced for the Legislative Assembly with multiple representatives from each electorate; this system lasted until it was abolished in 1926. Women were not able to be appointed to the Legislative Council until 1926; Premier John Storey attempted to appoint Kate Dwyer to the Legislative Council in 1921, but the appointment was ruled out of order. The first two women appointed to the Legislative Council were both Labor Party members proposed on 23 November 1931: Catherine Green, who took her seat the following day, and Ellen Webster, who joined her two days later.

In 1925, 1926, and 1929, Premier Jack Lang made unsuccessful attempts to abolish the Legislative Council, following the example of the Queensland Legislative Council in 1922. These attempts led to further reform, and in 1933 the law was changed so that a quarter of the Legislative Council would be elected every three years by members of the Legislative Assembly and the Legislative Council, rather than being appointed by the Governor.

From 1926, people receiving aid could again be on the electoral roll. Compulsory voting was introduced in 1928.

In 1978, the Council became a directly elected body in a program of electoral reform introduced by the Wran Labor government. The number of members was reduced to 45, although transitional arrangements meant that there were 43 members from 1978 to 1981, and 44 from 1981 to 1984. Further reform in 1991 by the Greiner Liberal–National government saw the size of the Legislative Council cut to 42 members, with half being elected every 4 years. In 1991, the Legislative Assembly was reduced from 109 to 99 members and then to 93 members in 1999.

=== Parliament House ===
The Parliament building was originally built on the orders of Governor Lachlan Macquarie, to be Sydney's second major hospital. In 1810, he awarded the contract to Garnham Blaxcell, Alexander Riley and D'Arcy Wentworth. The contract gave the builders the right to import 45,000 gallons of rum, for which they paid a duty of 3 shillings a gallon. They were able to sell it for a huge profit and in turn the government refunded them the duty as a payment for their work, thereby gaining for their construction the title of the 'Rum Hospital'. Originally consisting of three buildings, the central main building was demolished in 1879 to make way for the new Sydney Hospital, which was completed in 1885. The first building, now known as the Sydney Mint, was given to the Royal Mint in 1851 to become the Australian branch of its operations; it remained a mint until 1927.

The second building, originally built as the Chief Surgeon's quarters, was given to the government in 1829 for the purposes of a Parliament chamber. This chamber was added to following the growth of the legislature in 1843, and again in 1856. The last major renovation to the building was undertaken between 1974 and 1985, which saw a jumble of buildings that had become the parliamentary chambers demolished and replaced by a 12-story block linked by a fountain court to the original Parliament House. The building was also restored to its 1908 appearance.

== Composition and powers ==
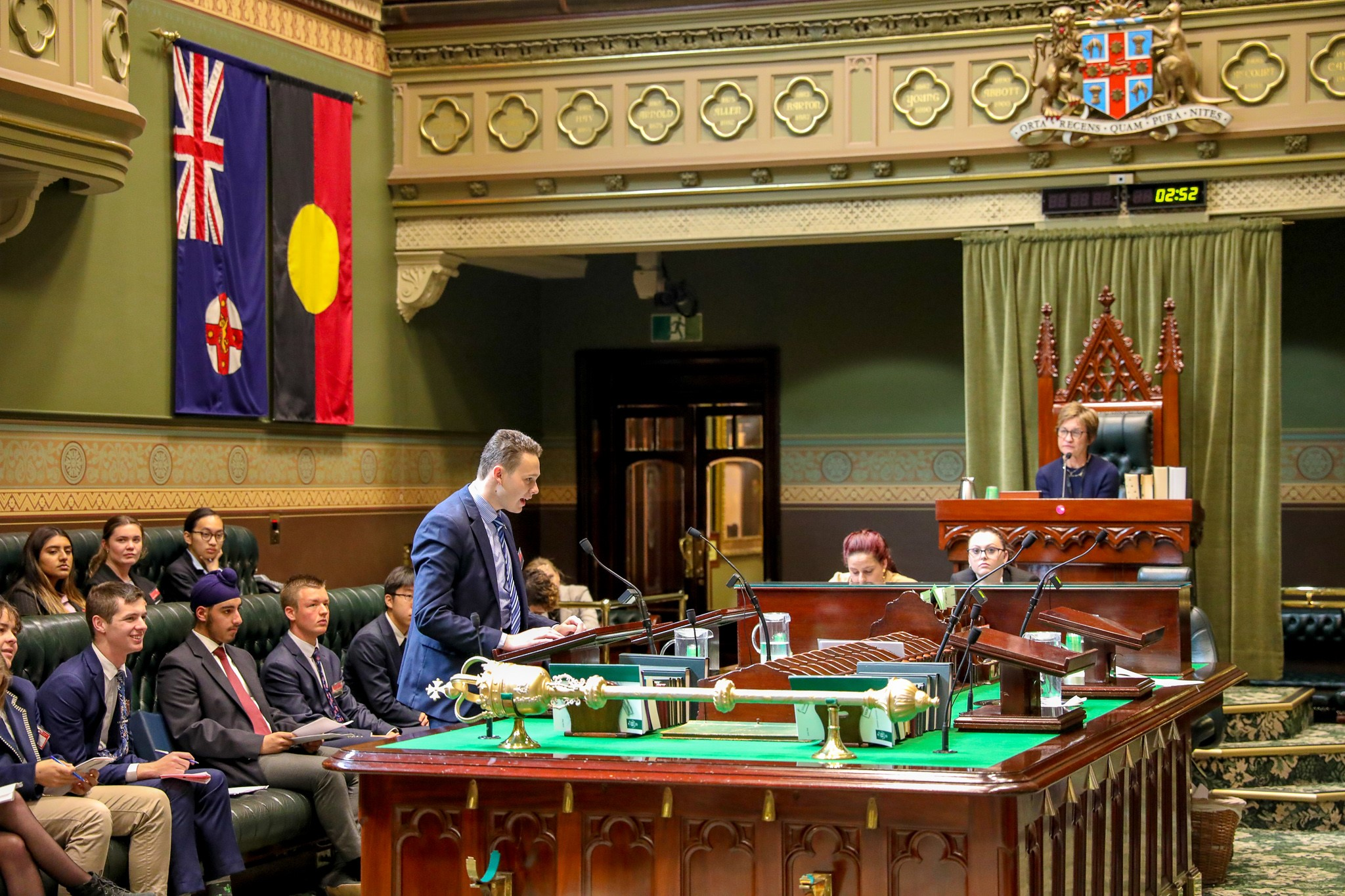
Legislative Assembly

The legislative authority, the King-in-Parliament, has three separate elements: the monarch; the Legislative Assembly; and the Legislative Council. This authority is granted by section 5 of the Constitution Act 1902; an Act that itself was passed by the NSW Parliament under the authority granted to it from the New South Wales Constitution Act 1855 (Imp). This was an act originating from a bill from the pre-responsible government Legislative Council, that was slightly modified and given the force of law as an act of the UK Parliament.

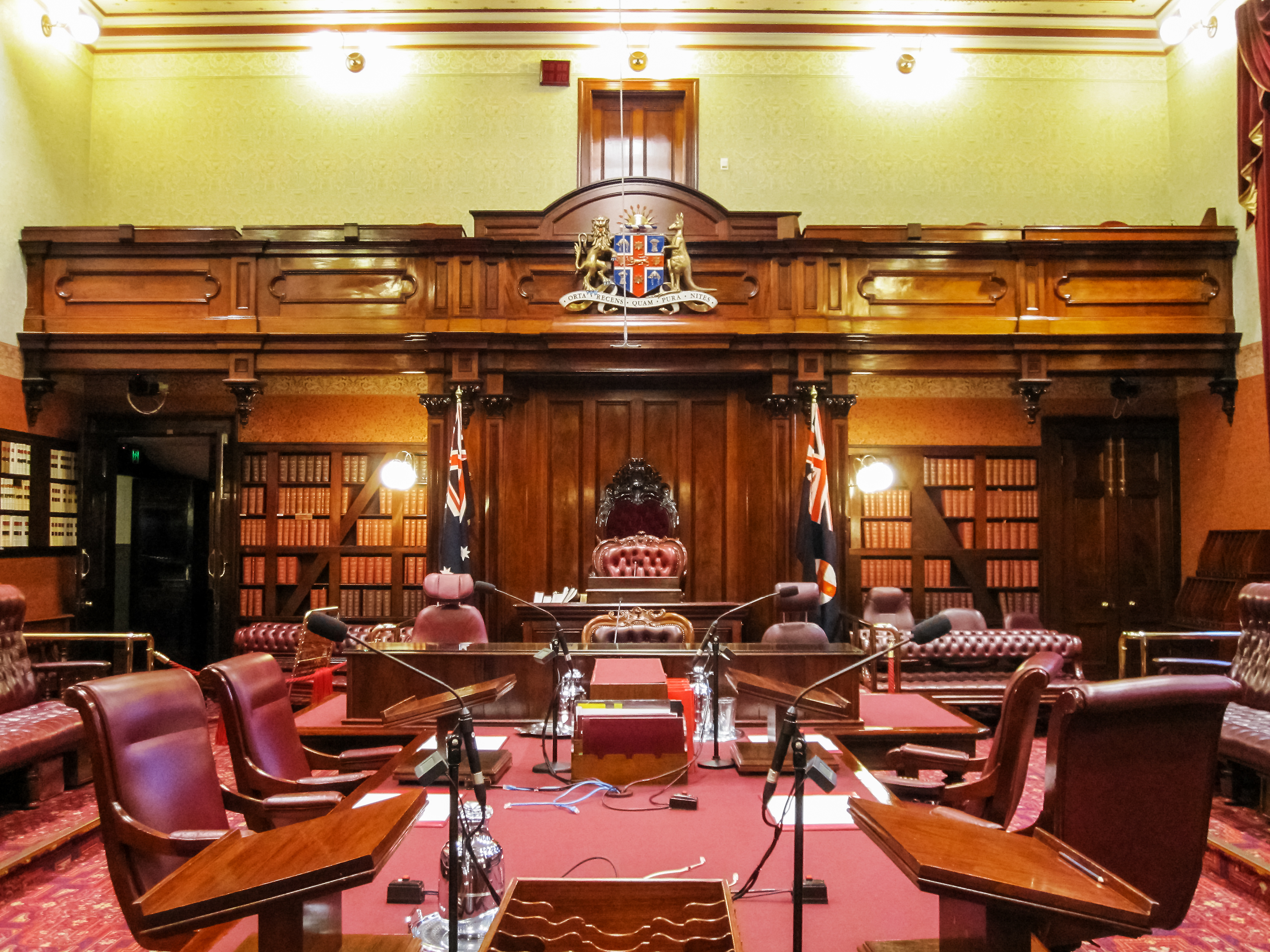
Legislative Council

All 93 members of the Legislative Assembly are elected at each general election from single-member districts using optional preferential voting to terms of up to four years. The 42 Legislative Council members are elected for two terms (a maximum of eight years), with half elected at each general election. Elections for the Legislative Council are conducted on a statewide, at-large basis (meaning all members represent the entire state) using the single transferable vote system similar to that used for elections to the federal Senate.

In the running of Parliament, the two presiding officers have a role that is similar to Ministers and their departments. The Speaker of the Legislative Assembly and the President of the Legislative Council are responsible for the employment of staff. In consultation with the parliamentary clerks, the presiding officers determine policy for the operation of their respective chambers and jointly for the Parliament.

The final step for a bill passed by the houses of parliament to become a law is the granting of royal assent by the Governor on behalf of the King. Other powers of the governor in relation to Parliament include the power to prorogue, summon and dissolve the houses, issue writs for elections and administer oaths to new members of parliament. These powers are in almost all circumstances exercised on the advice of the premier of New South Wales. The premier and government are directly accountable to Parliament through its control of public finances and the need for its confidence, and to the public through members of Parliament.

The governor chooses the premier, usually depending on the results of the general election, who then forms a government from members of the houses of Parliament. This must be someone who can command the confidence of a majority of members in the Legislative Assembly – usually as part of a political party. This is usually a straightforward decision, though occasionally the governor has to make a judgment, as in August 1939 when the governor, Lord Wakehurst, handled a major political crisis brought about when the former deputy leader of the governing United Australia Party, Eric Spooner, brought down Premier Bertram Stevens in a motion of no confidence. Wakehurst asked the treasurer, Alexander Mair, to form a government.

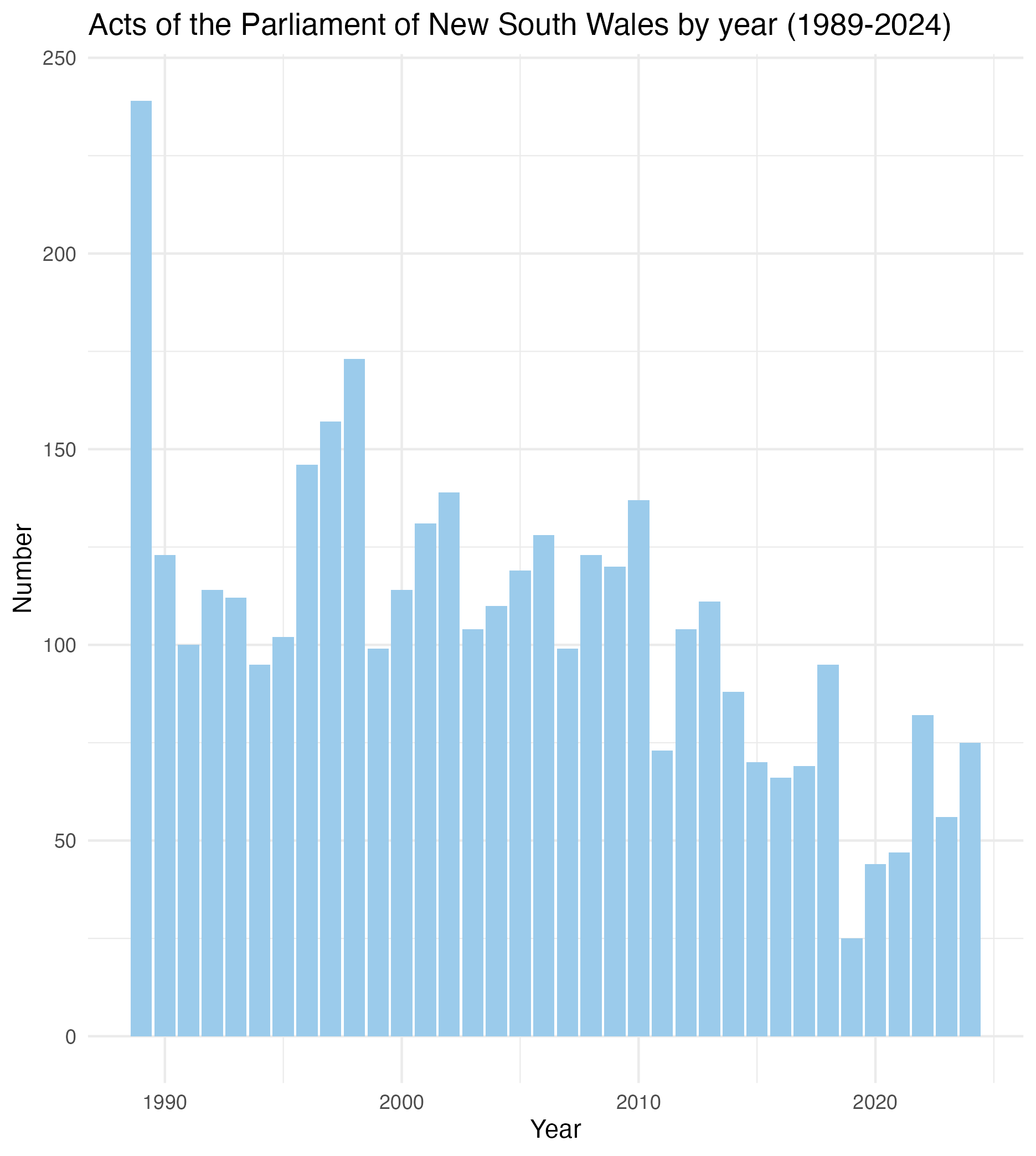
Bar chart showing the number of acts of the Parliament of New South Wales by year (1989-2024)

The current premier of New South Wales is Chris Minns of the Labor Party.

Government ministers (including the premier) must regularly answer questions in the chambers and there are a number of select committees that scrutinise particular issues and the workings of the government. There are also mechanisms that allow members of Parliament to bring to the attention of the government particular issues affecting their constituents.

For a bill to become law, it must be passed by both the Legislative Council and the Legislative Assembly and be assented to by the governor. Under Section 5A of the Constitution Act 1902, a bill appropriating revenue for the ordinary annual services of the government can be presented to the governor for assent even if the upper house has not agreed to it.

== State opening and traditions ==
Queen Elizabeth II opening the NSW Parliament on 4 February 1954

The state opening of Parliament is an annual event that marks the commencement of a session of the Parliament of New South Wales. It is held in the Legislative Council Chamber, usually in November or December, or in a general election year, when the new Parliament first assembles. It is an occasion for much pomp and ceremony, usually with a guard of honour and with dignitaries of the state attending. The New South Wales Parliament maintains many of the traditions of the original Parliament of the United Kingdom, from which the New South Wales Parliament was founded.

The Governor, or occasionally the Monarch, reads a prepared speech, known as the Speech from the Throne, outlining the government's agenda for the coming year. The speech is not written by the governor, but rather by the Cabinet, and reflects the legislative agenda for which they seek the agreement of both houses of Parliament.

Queen Elizabeth II opened the New South Wales Parliament on two occasions, on 4 February 1954, as part of her first visit to Australia, which was also the first occasion in which a Monarch of Australia had opened a session of any Australian parliament. The other occasion was on 20 February 1992, during her visit to Sydney to celebrate the sesquicentenary of the incorporation of the City of Sydney, on which occasion she stated:

This is my second opportunity to address this Parliament – a Parliament which I described on the previous occasion, in 1954, as the Mother Parliament of Australia. It is interesting to reflect that that was the first time on which the Sovereign had opened a Session of an Australian Parliament. I was also on my first visit to Australia as your Queen. I have returned to New South Wales eight times since then and am always delighted by the warm and generous hospitality accorded to Prince Philip and me by the people of this State. On this occasion I have come to join in commemorating Sydney's first one hundred and fifty years as a city.

== Longest-serving members ==
Directly elected members who served over 30 years:

- Fred Nile: LC 1981–2004, 2004–2023; 41 years
- Sir Henry Parkes: LC 1854–1856, LA 1856–1895; 41 years
- Joe Lawson: LA 1932–1973; 41 years
- Michael Bruxner: LA 1920–1962; 41 years
- Bill Dunn: LA 1910–1950; 39 years
- Jack Renshaw: LA 1941–1980; 38 years
- Gus Kelly: LA 1925–1932, 1935–1967; 38 years
- Bob Heffron: LA 1930–1968; 37 years
- Charles Lee: LA 1884–1920; 35 years
- George Booth: LA 1925–1960; 35 years
- David Hunter: LA 1940–1976; 35 years
- Carlo Lazzarini: LA 1917–1952; 35 years
- John Fitzpatrick: LA 1895–1930; 35 years
- Daniel Levy: LA 1901–1937; 35 years
- Mark Morton: LA 1901–1920, 1922–1938; 35 years
- Patrick McGirr: LA 1917–1920, LC 1921–1955; 35 years
- Joseph Cahill: LA 1925–1959; 34 years
- Nicholas Buzacott: LA 1925–1959; 34 years
- Jack Lang: LA 1913–1946; 33 years (+1946–1949 Federal)
- Pat Hills: LA 1954–1988; 33 years
- Bill Chaffey: LA 1940–1973; 33 years
- Joseph Jackson: LA 1922–1956; 33 years
- Billy Davies: LA 1917–1949; 32 years (+1949–1956 Federal)
- Harry Levien: LA 1880–1913; 32 years
- Douglas Darby: LA 1945–1978; 32 years
- Arthur Tonge: LA 1926–1932, 1935–1962; 32 years
- Frank Hawkins: LA 1935–1968; 32 years
- Bill Sheahan: LA 1941–1973; 32 years
- Reg Downing: LC 1940–1972; 31 years
- Mat Davidson: LA 1918–1949; 31 years
- John Perry: LA 1889–1920; 31 years
- Richard Amery: LA 1983–2015; 31 years
- Rex Jackson: LA 1955–1986; 31 years
- Maurice O'Sullivan: LA 1927–1959; 31 years
- Thomas Henley: LA 1904–1935; 30 years
- Kevin Rozzoli: LA 1973–2003; 30 years
- Richard Face: LA 1972–2003; 30 years
- Bill Crabtree: LA 1953–1983; 30 years
- Jack Beale: LA 1942–1973; 30 years
- Roy Vincent: LA 1922–1953; 30 years

Members of the non-directly elected Legislative Councils who served over 30 years:

- Henry Moses: LA 1869–1885, LC 1885–1923; 53 years
- John Creed: LC 1872–1874, 1885–1930; 47 years
- Robert Fitzgerald: LA 1885–1901, LC 1901–1933; 47 years
- Frank Spicer: LC 1925–1973; 47 years
- Charles James Roberts: LA 1882–1890, LC 1890–1925; 43 years
- Edward Deas Thomson: LC 1837–1879; 42 years
- George Cox: LA 1856–1859, LC 1863–1901; 41 years
- Broughton O'Conor: LA 1889–1907, LC 1908–1940; 41 years
- Alexander Alam: LC 1925–1958, 1963–1973; 41 years
- Henry Horne: LA 1907–1911, LC 1917–1955; 40 years
- Charles Mackellar: LC 1885–1903, 1903–1925; 39 years
- Kenneth Mackay: LA 1895–1899, LC 1899–1934; 39 years
- Robert Mahony: LC 1921–1961; 39 years
- Ernest Farrar: LC 1912–1952; 39 years
- Thomas Playfair: LC 1927–1966; 39 years
- Graham Pratten: LC 1937–1976; 38 years (+Federal 1928–1929)
- Henry Cary Dangar: LA 1874–1877, 1880–1882, LC 1883–1917; 38 years
- Thomas Murray: LC 1921–1958; 36 years
- Hector Clayton: LC 1937–1973: 36 years
- Henry Kater: LC 1889–1924; 35 years
- William Dickson: LC 1925–1934, 1940–1966; 34 years
- John Hepher: LC 1899–1932; 33 years
- William Byrnes: LC 1858–1861, 1861–1891; 32 years
- George Earp: LC 1900–1933; 32 years
- James Concannon: LC 1925–1958; 32 years
- Otway Falkiner: LC 1946–1978; 32 years
- Harry Budd: LC 1946–1978; 32 years
- Brad Hazzard: LA 1991–2023; 31 years
- Alfred Meeks: LC 1900–1932; 31 years
- Norman William Kater: LC 1923–1955; 31 years
- William Coulter: LC 1947–1978; 30 years
- Jim Maloney: LC 1941–1972; 30 years

== Emblem ==
The official emblem of the New South Wales Parliament is a crowned circlet featuring the coat of arms of New South Wales taking the form of a Scottish crest badge. Crest badges, much like clan tartans, do not have a long history, and owe much to Victorian era romanticism, having only been worn on the bonnet since the mid-19th century when the buckled strap device commonly used by the Order of the Garter was adopted as a popular design to encircle monogram escutcheons and heraldic crests.

The crest badge came to be accepted in the mid-20th century as the emblem of both houses of Parliament. The emblem appears on official stationery, publications and papers, and is stamped on various items in use in the Parliament, such as cutlery, silverware and china.

== See also ==
- Lists of acts of the Parliament of New South Wales
- List of New South Wales state elections
- Parliaments of the Australian states and territories
- Official Openings by the Monarch in Australia
