= The Land (newspaper) =

English language newspaper published by Australian Community Media

- Type: Weekly newspaper
- Owner: Australian Community Media
- Founder(s): NSW Farmers and Settlers Association
- Editor: Andrew Norris
- Language: English
- Headquarters: North Richmond, N.S.W.
- ISSN: 0023-7523
- Website: theland.com.au

The Land is an English language newspaper published in Sydney and later in North Richmond, New South Wales by Australian Community Media. The newspaper commenced publication in 1911.

== History ==
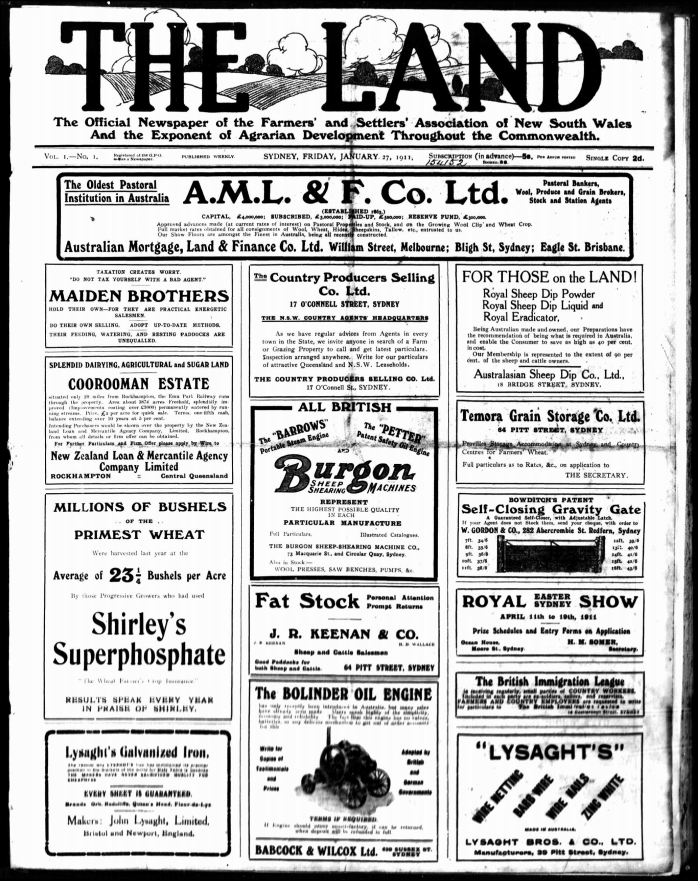
The front page of The Land on 27 January 1911

The Land first appeared in 1911 as a two penny broadsheet. It was founded by the Farmers' and Settlers' Association of New South Wales after losing their weekly Farmer and Settler. It was later published by Rural Press, which merged with Fairfax Media.

In 1930 Harry J. Stephens took up the post of editor; he had been from 1906 to 1920 the driving force behind the paper's chief competitor, The Farmer and Settler.

== Digitisation ==
The paper has been digitised as part of the Australian Newspapers Digitisation Program project of the National Library of Australia.

== See also ==
- List of newspapers in Australia
- List of newspapers in New South Wales
