= George Mullin =

George Mullin may refer to:

- George Mullin (baseball) (1880–1944), American baseball pitcher
- George Mullin (VC) (1892–1963), American-Canadian recipient of the Victoria Cross during World War I

== See also ==
- George Mullins (disambiguation)
