= Harry J. Stephens =

Australian journalist

Harry James Stephens (c. 1866 – 25 August 1947) was an Australian journalist with a long career, mostly in Victoria and New South Wales agricultural districts. He was with The Farmer & Settler of Sydney for fourteen years and while editing that paper created Australia's first Country Party; later was editor of rival newspaper The Land.

== History ==
He was successively editor of the Melbourne War Cry and reporter for the Launceston Daily Telegraph, then founder and editor of the Launceston Federalist; editor of the Charlton Tribune; managing editor of the Numurkah Leader; sub-editor of Sydney's Sunday Times.

He was chief sub-editor of The Farmer & Settler, Sydney 1906–1920. He founded the Country Party in 1912, with decentralisation, rural development and defence its primary concerns.

In 1920 he was founder and managing editor for C. J. De Garis of the Sunraysia Daily, Mildura; A year later, he purchased Wentworth's Western Advertiser from Frank Wilkinson. The newspaper failed financially and was placed in the hands of receivers.

In 1922 Stephens was, with R. M. Black, M. Young, M. J. Kelly, L. H. Iredale, and John Zimmer, a group of businessmen who came to the rescue of the insolvent Sunraysia Daily, sister publication of the Ouyen Mail. He left Mildura for Sydney in June 1923.

He was for two years editor and managing director of Mallee Newspapers Pty Ltd, which also published, at Ouyen, the Murrayville Mirror, Woomelang Sun, Mallee Harvester, and Underbool Mirror.

In December 1929 became editor of The Land, rival newspaper of The Farmer and Settler. It is possible he returned to the Farmer and Settler in 1932, as from 30 January 1932 to 22 July 1937 its banner was subtitled "Conducted by Uncle Wiseman", that being a known pseudonym.

He was publicity officer for the National Party in Sydney;

and Fruit Culture.

His last appointment was as executive of the A.B.C.'s Publicity Department.
