= Keith Brooks (footballer) =

Australian rules footballer, born 1917

Personal information
- Full name: Keith Brooks
- Born: 8 April 1917
- Died: 23 December 1981 (aged 64)
- Original team: Brighton
- Height: 178 cm (5 ft 10 in)
- Weight: 81 kg (179 lb)

Playing career^{1}
Years	Club	Games (Goals)
1941	Richmond	7 (0)
- ^{1} Playing statistics correct to the end of 1941.

Keith Brooks (8 April 1917 – 23 December 1981) was a former Australian rules footballer who played with Richmond in the Victorian Football League (VFL).
