= George Mullins (rugby league) =

Australian rugby league player

Personal information
- Full name: George Arthur Mullins
- Born: 7 September 1907; Wellington, New Zealand
- Died: 22 October 1995 (aged 88)

Playing information
- Position: Front-row
Club
Years	Team	Pld	T	G	FG	P
1930–32	Balmain Tigers	13	3	4	0	17

Coaching information
Club
Years	Team	Gms	W	D	L	W%
1949	Manly Warringah	18	6	1	11	33
- Father: George Mullins Sr

George Arthur Mullins (7 September 1907 – 22 October 1995) was an Australian rugby league player and coach.

== Early life ==
Mullins, known as "Barney", was born to Australian parents in New Zealand, where his father George Sr worked at the time as a coal miner and labourer. He grew up in Sydney and his father became mayor of Balmain, then a Labor member of the New South Wales Legislative Council during the 1930s and 1940s.

== Career ==
A front-rower, Mullins competed in first grade for Balmain between 1930 and 1932. He had a season as coach of Manly Warringah in 1949, with the club finishing out of the finals in eighth position.

Mullins was also a noted surf swimmer and had a race in Freshwater, Sydney, named after him.
