= List of acts of the Parliament of New South Wales from 1825 =

This is a list of acts of the Parliament of New South Wales for the year 1825.

== 1825 ==
Continuing the first Legislative Council of New South Wales, which met from 25 August 1824 until 22 November 1825.

Short title, or popular name	Citation	Royal assent
Long title
Past Ordinances Confirmation Act 1825	5 Geo. IV. No. 2	4 January 1825
An Ordinance to stay proceedings against any person or persons advising issuing or executing any Proclamation Order or other Act of any Governor or Acting Governor of New South Wales and the Dependencies of the Government of the said Colony.
Runaway Convicts Harbouring Act 1825	5 Geo. IV. No. 3	19 January 1825
An Act to prevent the harbouring of Runaway Convicts and the encouraging of Convicts tippling or gambling.
Licensed Publicans Act 1825	6 Geo. IV. No. 4	8 February 1825
An Act to regulate the granting of Licenses for the Sale of Spirits Ale Beer and other Liquors in New South Wales and Van Diemen's Land respectively.
Male Convicts Punishment Act 1825	6 Geo. IV. No. 5	8 February 1825
An Act for the Summary Punishment of Misbehaviour or Disorderly Conduct in any Offender in the Service of Government or of any Inhabitant in New South Wales or Van Diemen's Land.
Licensed Publicans Act (No. 2) 1825	6 Geo. IV. No. 6	15 February 1825
An Act to suspend for a limited time so much of an Act intituled "An Act to regulate the granting of Licenses for the Sale of Spirits Ale Beer and other Liquors in New South Wales and Van Diemen's Land respectively" (Note: Licensed Publicans Act 1825 (6 Geo. IV. No. 4)) as requires the Certificate therein-mentioned to be signed by a Minister of the Church of England.
Licensed Publicans Act (No. 3) 1825	6 Geo. IV. No. 7	22 February 1825
An Act to enlarge the time for the granting of Licenses in pursuance of an Act intituled "An Act to regulate the granting of Licenses for the Sale of Spirits Ale Beer and other Liquors in New South Wales and Van Diemen's Land respectively."
Imprisoned Debtors Act 1825	6 Geo. IV. No. 8	30 March 1825
An Act for the Relief of Persons imprisoned for Debt.
Justices Summary Jurisdiction Act 1825	6 Geo. IV. No. 9	30 March 1825
An Act to facilitate the Proceedings of Justices of the Peace in the exercise of their summary Jurisdiction.
Shipping Act 1825	6 Geo. IV. No. 10	5 April 1825
An Act for the Regulation of Shipping in the Harbours of New South Wales and Van Diemen's Land respectively.
Past Acts Confirmation Act 1825	6 Geo. IV. No. 11	15 June 1825
An Act to confirm certain Acts of His Excellency Sir Thomas Brisbane passed with the advice of the Council before the residence of William Stewart Esquire in the Colony of New South Wales.
Licensed Publicans Act (No. 4) 1825	6 Geo. IV. No. 12	15 June 1825
An Act to confirm certain Licenses granted under the authority of an Act to regulate the granting of Licenses for the Sale of Spirits Ale Beer and other Liquors in New South Wales and Van Diemen's Land respectively and two others (Note: Licensed Publicans Act (No. 2) 1825 (6 Geo. IV. No. 6)) (Note: Licensed Publicans Act (No. 3) 1825 (6 Geo. IV. No. 7)) amending the same.
Pitman's Naturalization Act 1825	6 Geo. IV. No. 13	5 July 1825
An Act to Naturalize Timothy Goodwin Pitman.
Duties Collection Indemnity Act 1825	6 Geo. IV. No.	10 August 1825
An Act to stay Proceedings against the Colonial Treasurers of New South Wales and Van Diemen's Land respectively or any other person for collecting levying or receiving Duties.
Hulks Regulation Act 1825	6 Geo. IV. No. 15	10 August 1825
An Act for the temporary Regulation of the Hulk or Floating Prison in Sydney Harbour.
Puisne Judge Act 1825	6 Geo. IV. No. 16	17 August 1825
An Act to authorise the appointing of an Additional Judge in the Supreme Court of New South Wales.
De Mestre's Naturalization Act 1825	6 Geo. IV. No. 17	30 August 1825
An Act to Naturalize Prosper De Mestre.
Justices Indemnity Act 1825	6 Geo. IV. No. 18	11 October 1825
An Ordinance to stay Proceedings in certain cases against Justices of the Peace in New South Wales and its Dependencies acting in execution of their office.
Fines and Penalties Recovery Act 1825	6 Geo. IV. No. 19	1 November 1825
An Ordinance for the more effectual Recovery of Fines and Penalties imposed by divers Acts of Council and for other purposes.
Imposts Continuation Act 1825	6 Geo. IV. No. 20	1 November 1825
An Act to continue until further provision shall be made certain Duties Tolls Rates Fees and other Sums of Money imposed by the Governors of New South Wales and for other purposes.
Parish Registers Act 1825	6 Geo. IV. No. 21	1 November 1825
An Act for better regulating and preserving Parish and other Registers of Births Baptisms Marriages and Burials in New South Wales and its Dependencies including Van Diemen's Land.
Deeds Registration Act 1825	6 Geo. IV. No. 22	16 November 1825
An Act for registering Deeds and Conveyances in New South Wales and for other purposes.
Postage Act 1825	6 Geo. IV. No. 23	22 November 1825
An Act to regulate the Postage of Letters in New South Wales.

== Sources ==
- "1825 New South Wales Acts As Made". AustLii.
