= Nock & Kirby =

Australian retail store

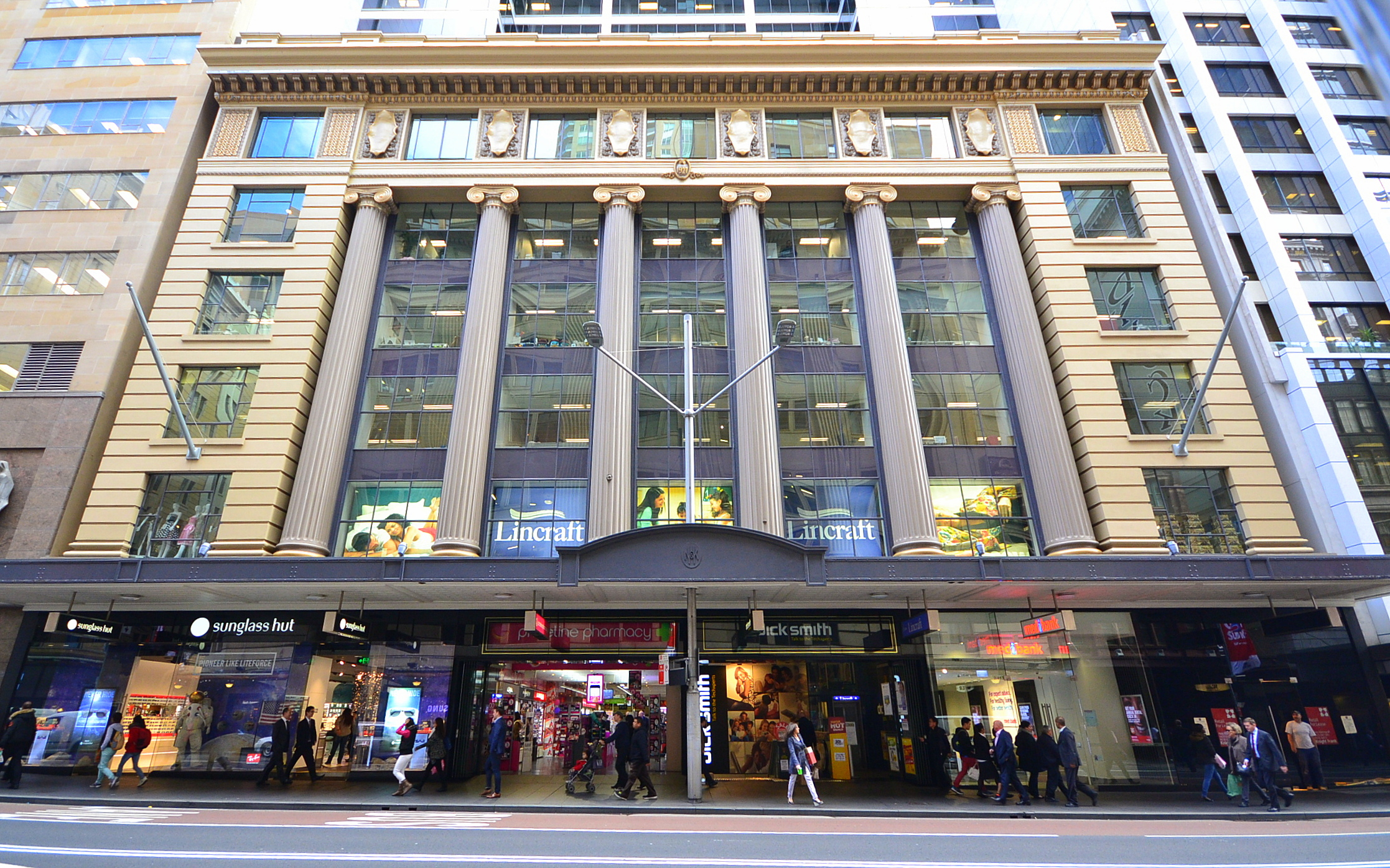
Nock and Kirby building, George Street, Sydney

Nock & Kirby was a Sydney-based retail store trading in hardware and general household goods.

== History ==
Nock and Kirby began as a partnership of Thomas Nock and Herbert Kirby in 1894. It became a limited liability company in 1906. It had a subsidiary, Beard Watson. It had investments in Outboard Marine Australia Pty. Ltd. and in a brick manufacturer, Zacuba Pty Ltd.

Two Nock & Kirby demonstrators, "Joe the Gadget Man" and "Handy Andy", employed from about 1950, became household names through their appearance in ads and TV shows.

All stores were changed to BBC Hardware following acquisition by Burns Philp in 1983.
