= List of acts of the Parliament of New South Wales from 1824 =

This is a list of acts of the Parliament of New South Wales for the year 1824.

== 1824 ==
The first Legislative Council of New South Wales, which met from 25 August 1824 until 22 November 1825.

Short title, or popular name	Citation	Royal assent
Long title
Currency Act 1824 (repealed)	5 Geo. IV. No. 1	28 September 1824
An Act to make Promissory Notes and Bills of Exchange payable in Spanish Dollars available as if such Notes and Bills had been drawn payable in Sterling Money of the Realm. (Repealed by Currency Act 1826 (7 Geo. IV. No. 3))

== Sources ==
- "1824 New South Wales Acts As Made". AustLii.
