= List of acts of the Parliament of New South Wales from 1826 =

This is a list of acts of the Parliament of New South Wales for the year 1826.

== 1826 ==
The first session of the second Legislative Council of New South Wales, which met from 20 December 1825 until 16 August 1826.

Short title, or popular name	Citation	Royal assent
Long title
Hulks Regulation Act 1826	7 Geo. IV. No. 1	17 February 1826
An Act for the Regulation of the Hulk or Floating Prison in Sydney Harbour.
Licensed Publicans Act 1826	7 Geo. IV. No. 2	20 February 1826
An Act for repealing the Laws now in force relative to the licensing and regulating of Public-houses and for the better regulating the granting of Licenses for the Sale of Ale Beer Wine Spirits and other Liquors in New South Wales in future.
Currency Act 1826	7 Geo. IV. No. 3	12 July 1826
An Act to repeal an Act intituled "An Act to make Promissory Notes and Bills of Exchange payable in Spanish Dollars available as if such Notes and Bills had, been drawn payable in Sterling Money of the Realm" (Note: Currency Act 1824 (5 Geo. IV. No. 1)) and to promote the circulation of Sterling Money of Great Britain in New South Wales.
Orphan School Estates Act 1826	7 Geo. IV. No. 4	2 August 1826
An Act tor vesting the Orphan School Estates in the Trustees of the Clergy and School Lands in the Colony of New South Wales and for duly governing the Children at School and in Apprenticeship.
Transportation Act 1826	7 Geo. IV. No. 5	16 August 1826
An Act for the Transportation of Offenders to Penal Settlements and for the more effectual Punishment and Security of the same.

== Sources ==
- "1826 New South Wales Acts As Made". AustLii.
