= John Tonkin (New South Wales politician) =

Australian politician

John Horace Tonkin (19 October 1889 – 2 November 1967) was an Australian politician.

He was born in Avenel in Victoria to storekeeper Samuel Tonkin and Josephine Emmerson. He attended Central College in Geelong and became a surveyor, working on the railways and for a number of local governments. On 11 October 1916 he married Harriett Doris Higginson, with whom he had two children.

From 1919 he worked in Mosman in Sydney, and from 1927 to 1940 was managing director of Concreters Limited; he was subsequently a consulting engineer and builder. From 1940 to 1946 he was a United Australia Party member of the New South Wales Legislative Council. Tonkin died in Mosman in 1967.
