= William Gibb (politician) =

Australian politician

William James Gibb (25 June 1882 – 8 August 1952) was an Australian politician.

He was born at Redfern to tramdriver James Gibb and Julie Smith. He worked as a tailor, and was vice-president of the Amalgamated Clothing and Allied Trades' Union from 1917, becoming federal president from 1928 to 1929. On 9 December 1922 he married Elizabeth Kelly; he would later marry again on 14 April 1949 to Charlotte Dalton McMahon. He served on the Labor Party central executive from 1923 to 1924. He was a Labor member of the New South Wales Legislative Council from 1931 to 1934 and from 1943 to 1952, when he died at Darlinghurst.
