= Maxwell Dunlop (politician) =

Australian politician

Maxwell Pollok Dunlop OBE (28 June 1876 – 1 August 1941) was an Australian politician.

He was born in South Yarra to draper John Dunlop and Mary Barr Brown. He attended State schools and then All Saints Grammar in St Kilda. He worked as a farm hand at Dunolly and then became a station manager. On 24 May 1900 he married Eva Sharp, with whom he had two daughters and one son. He later became a dairy farmer at Kyogle, and in 1919 moved to Sydney as secretary of the Primary Producers' Union, of which he was president from 1933 to 1941. From 1932 to 1941 he was a Country Party member of the New South Wales Legislative Council. He was appointed Officer of the Order of the British Empire in 1938. Dunlop died at Eastwood in 1941.
