= Francis Kelly (Australian politician) =

Australian politician

Francis Daniel Kelly (29 November 1893 – 10 March 1980) was an Australian politician.

He was born in Armidale to farmer William Kelly and Annie O'Neill. He attended Smith Street Public School in Balmain, leaving at twelve and working for the Oriental Tea Company as a storeman. From 1916 to 1918 he served in the 38th Battalion in World War I. In January 1920 he married Eileen Wellfare, with whom he had two children. A Randwick alderman from 1934 to 1937, he was president of the Storeman and Packers Union from 1941 to 1947 and a delegate to the Trades and Labor Council from 1931 to 1941. From 1942 to 1947 he was a Labor member of the New South Wales Legislative Council. He was also president of the Labor Party central executive from 1943 to 1947. In 1947 he took up a position as the Commonwealth Arbitration Commissioner, which he held until 1958. Kelly died at Concord in 1980.
