= Theodore Trautwein (politician) =

Hotelier, racehorse owner and politician from New South Wales, Australia

Theodore Charles Trautwein (20 December 1869 – 7 August 1955) was an Australian hotelier, racehorse owner and member of the New South Wales Legislative Council.

He was born in Camperdown in Victoria to Theodore Trautwein and Annie McCarthy. He became a publican, with a hotel at Katoomba and several others. In 1900 he married Katherine Gertrude Elizabeth Kane.

Trautwein was a long time member of the Labor party. In 1934 he was surprisingly elected as an independent candidate to a twelve-year term in the first indirect elections for the Legislative Council. He ceased to be a member of the Labor party in June 1936, with Trautwein saying he had resigned, while the party executive said he had been expelled.

He was involved in litigation with the Australian Taxation Office in relation to his income for the years from 1921 to 1927. Trautwein had not kept proper records and the Tax Office assessed his income on the basis of the unaccounted for accumulation of assets. He raised various questions of law, including claims that this included his winnings from betting activities, capital gains from the sale of property and his interest in various hotels, however the High Court dismissed his contentions. Justice Evatt dismissed his appeal against the assessment of more than £143000 (equivalent to $15,437,000 in 2022).

On 16 April 1940 Trautwein was convicted of making a false representation that a document had been executed by his wife, son and daughter in order to avoid bankruptcy and was sentenced to 12 months imprisonment at the State Penitentiary at Long Bay. The Legislative Council asked the Court of Disputed Returns to determine if this was an "infamous crime" under the constitution, causing his seat to be vacant. Justice Maxwell held that the crime was analogous to forgery, was a fraud on the state and was at least an attempt to pervert the course of justice, concluding that this was an infamous crime and that Trautwein's seat had therefore become vacant. Although sentenced to 12 months in prison, he was released in December 1940.

He was bankrupted on 23 September 1940, and spent various periods in prison for contempt of court in 1941, 1942, and 1943. Trautwein's bankruptcy was discharged in 1950.

Trautwein died in Sydney in 1955 (aged 85).
