= William Bradley (New South Wales politician, born 1881) =

Australian politician

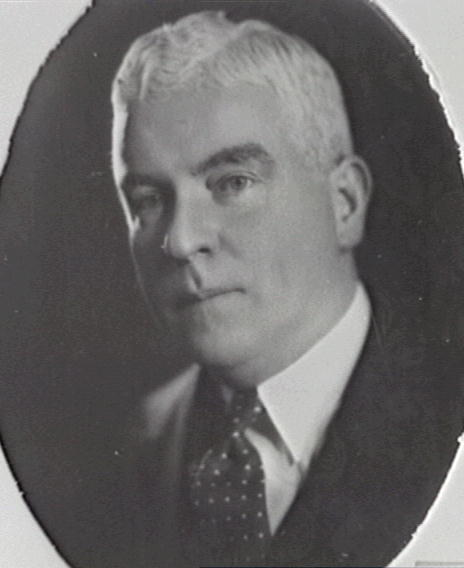
William James Bradley

William James Bradley KC (12 April 1881 – 1 July 1957) was an Australian politician.

== Early life ==
William was born in Alexandria to builder Michael Bradley and Bridget Clerkins. He attended school locally. He later became a clerk with the Crown Solicitors' Office from 1917 to 1918. During this time, he was also studying part-time at the University of Sydney, receiving a Bachelor of Arts in 1915 and a Bachelor of Law in 1919.

He was called to the bar in 1919 and focused on commercial and industrial law. On 25 January 1922 he married Coralie Viola Moloney (née Goold). From 1912 to 1942, he served in the Australian Military Forces, in later years was part of the Army Legal Corps. He was in the King's Counsel from 1934.

== Political life ==
Bradley was a member of Sydney City Council from 1937 to 1948. From 1940 to 1949, he was a member of the New South Wales Legislative Council, representing first the United Australia Party and then the Liberal Party.

== Death ==
Bradley died at Lewisham in 1957.
