= Edmond Speck =

Australian politician

Edmond John Clarke Speck (1886 – 16 April 1959) was an Australian politician.

He was born in Forbes to grazier Robert Speck and Dorothy Ann Clarke. He attended Lachlan College and became a grazier, inheriting the family property on his father's death in 1929. He was a councillor for Jemalong Shire from 1937 to 1944, and in 1945 married Ina Peasley. From 1940 to 1952 he was a member of the New South Wales Legislative Council, first for the United Australia Party and then for the Liberal Party. Speck died at Forbes in 1959.
