= John Stewart (New South Wales Labor politician) =

Australian politician

John Stewart (1876 – 8 April 1957) was an Australian politician.

Born in Campbeltown, Argyllshire, Scotland to farmer John Stewart and Barbara Thomson, he arrived in Australia in 1912, taking up work as an electrician. He married Blanche Ogillvie Macfarlane, with whom he had four sons. He became an organiser with the Electrical Trades Union (ETU) in 1931 and was also a member of the Labor Party's Socialisation Committee from 1931 to 1933. He was secretary of the ETU from 1939 to 1941 and secretary of the New South Wales Labor Party from 1941 to 1950. He was elected to the New South Wales Legislative Council in 1941. In 1948 he was a delegate to the United Nations conference in Paris, and he was sent on a visit to the United Kingdom in 1955. Stewart died at Petersham on 8 April 1957 (aged 80–81).
