= Henry Moulder =

Australian politician

Henry Clements Moulder (21 February 1883 – 7 September 1967) was an Australian politician.

He was born in Condobolin to grazier Edward Henry Moulder and Johanna Walker. He attended school at Orange and worked on his father's station before becoming a stock and station agent. On 14 April 1909 he married Pauline Hawkins, with whom he had two children. He owned property of his own at Redloum, and was a Condobolin alderman from 1920 to 1944, serving three times as mayor (1920–22, 1924–34, 1937–42). From 1932 to 1946 he was a Country Party member of the New South Wales Legislative Council. Moulder died in Condobolin in 1967.
