= Walter Cambridge =

Australian politician

Walter Corrie Cambridge (1 May 1875 – 14 April 1954) was an Australian politician.

He was born in Sydney to engineer Henry Cambridge. He grew up in Hay, but later returned to Sydney and was an apprentice printer. Around 1908, he married Clarinda Sale, with whom he had two daughters. From 1917, he was an organiser with the Farmers' and Settlers' Association of New South Wales, becoming assistant secretary in 1919 and general secretary from 1925 to 1945; he was also active in the formation of the Progressive Party. From 1932 to 1946, he was a Country Party member of the New South Wales Legislative Council. Cambridge died at Marrickville in 1954.
