= Ernest Mitchell =

Australian politician

Ernest Meyer Mitchell KC

Member of the New South Wales Legislative Council
- In office 1934–1943

Personal details
- Born: 12 February 1875 Sydney, New South Wales, Australia
- Died: 21 April 1943 (aged 68) Neutral Bay, New South Wales, Australia
- Party: United Australia Party
- Education: University of Sydney
- Profession: Lawyer

Ernest Meyer Mitchell KC (12 February 1875 – 21 April 1943) was an Australian politician.

He was born in Sydney to jeweller Philip Mitchell and Rosalie Brodziak. He attended Sydney Grammar School and then the University of Sydney, where he received a Bachelor of Arts in 1896 and a Bachelor of Law in 1900. He was called to the bar in 1900 and lectured at the university from 1907 to 1916. On 14 April 1915 he married Mable Daisy Black. He served with the 4th and 1st Machine Gun Battalions during World War I, being mentioned in dispatches; he retired from the military in 1924 as a lieutenant colonel. He returned to his practice after the war as an expert on constitutional law, and was appointed King's Counsel in 1925. From 1934 to 1943 he was a United Australia Party member of the New South Wales Legislative Council. Mitchell died in Neutral Bay in 1943.
