= Thomas Sinclair Holden =

Australian judge and politician(1906–1973)

Thomas Sinclair Holden (6 January 1906 – 23 December 1973) was an Australian politician and judge.

He was born in Redfern to Thomas Douglas Percy Holden, also a politician. He attended Fort Street High School and in 1928 received a Bachelor of Law from the University of Sydney. He married Rose Scott Winden, with whom he had three children. From 1928 he practised as a solicitor, and was called to the bar in 1938. He specialised in workers' compensation. From 1934 to 1945 he was a member of the New South Wales Legislative Council, representing the United Australia Party and then, briefly, the Liberal Party. He resigned in 1945 to take up a judgeship on the District Court, where he remained until 1965. Holden died at Strathfield in 1973.
