= John Culbert (Australian politician) =

Australian politician

John Culbert (22 February 1888 – 19 August 1943) was an Australian politician.

He was born in Camperdown to carpenter James Culbert and Annie Josephine Farrelly. He was educated at Newtown and became a messenger boy with the Government Printing Office before working in timbermills. On 10 September 1913 he married Delia Winifred Brady, with whom he had two sons. He was state secretary of the Australian Timberworkers Union from 1920 to 1943 and later federal president. From 1925 to 1943 he was a Labor member of the New South Wales Legislative Council. He was arrested in 1929 after the Timber Workers strike but was found not guilty of conspiracy. Culbert died in Annandale in 1943.
