= Hector Clayton =

Australian politician

Major The Honourable Sir Hector Clayton ED

Leader of the New South Wales Opposition in the Legislative Council
- In office 12 April 1960 – 30 October 1962
- Preceded by: Sir Henry Manning
- Succeeded by: Arthur Bridges

Member of the Legislative Council of New South Wales
- In office 23 April 1937 – 22 April 1973

Personal details
- Born: 3 June 1885 Surry Hills, Colony of New South Wales
- Died: 18 July 1975 (aged 90) Paddington, New South Wales, Australia
- Spouse: Phyllis Edith Midwood
- Awards: Knight Bachelor; Efficiency Decoration; 1914–15 Star; British War Medal; Victory Medal; War Medal; Aus. Service Medal; King George VI Coronation Medal; Mentioned in despatches

Military service
- Allegiance: Australia
- Branch/service: (Australia) Australian Army
- Years of service: 1914 – 1945
- Rank: Major & Honorary Colonel
- Unit: 4th Battalion, AIF; Quartermaster general's department
- Battles/wars: World War I; Gallipoli Campaign; Western Front; World War II

Major Sir Hector Joseph Richard Clayton, ED (3 June 1885 – 18 July 1975) was an Australian politician, solicitor and soldier. He was a member of the New South Wales Legislative Council for 36 years from 1937 to 1973 representing the Liberal Party and its predecessor, the United Australia Party, becoming Leader of the New South Wales Opposition in the Legislative Council from 1960 until 1962.

== Early years and military career ==
Hector Joseph Richard Clayton was born in Surry Hills, New South Wales in 1885, the son of solicitor John Horatio Clayton and Isabel Woodward. After being educated at Sydney Grammar School, Clayton undertook studies at the University of Sydney, graduating with a Bachelor of Arts (1907) and a Bachelor of Laws (1910). After qualifying as a solicitor in 1911, Clayton was made a partner in his father's firm, John H.Clayton and Son from 1911 until 1920.

When the First World War broke out in 1914, Clayton immediately signed up to the First Australian Imperial Force with a commission and was posted to the 4th Battalion, AIF. He embarked for Egypt in October as a captain and took part in the landing on Gallipoli on 25 April 1915. In 1916, he was transferred to the Western Front, was promoted to major in November, and commanded the 4th Division Base, being mentioned in dispatches. He undertook administrative duties in England from June 1918. On 24 July 1917 he married Phyllis Edith Midwood at the parish church, Market Drayton, Shropshire.

After demobilisation, Clayton returned to the law as a partner in Clayton and Utz (1920-1924) and later in Clayton, Utz and Company (1924-1975). A member of the conservative United Australia Party, Clayton was elected to the indirectly elected New South Wales Legislative Council on 8 December 1936 and took his seat on 23 Apr 1937. However, he subsequently resigned from the UAP, as he believed that the council should be a non-partisan house of review, but remained a consistent supporter of his former party. Having been placed on the Reserve of Officers, Clayton was mobilised on the outbreak of war on 4 September 1939. After undertaking mostly administrative tasks, from July 1942 he commanded the 1st Movement Control Group in the New South Wales Lines of Communication Area. In August 1945, he was placed on the Retired List as honorary colonel.

== Political career ==
A distinguished though uncombative member in the council, Clayton eventually succeeded as the Leader of the New South Wales Opposition in the Legislative Council, in 1960. His most significant achievement was found in attacking the Labor Government's attempts to abolish the Legislative Council, leading the campaign through the Supreme Court and the High Court of Australia and the subsequent referendum in April 1961, which overwhelmingly rejected the abolition proposal and marked the decline of the Labor government that had been in power since 1941. He stood down as leader in 1962, after problems with the leadership of the Liberal Party.

In August 1966, Clayton decided to run for President of the New South Wales Legislative Council, being nominated by his friend and colleague Thomas Playfair. However, on the morning of the council meeting, Playfair suffered a fatal heart attack and Clayton withdrew his nomination. Having served as a company director of several insurance companies and a protector of the rights of businesses from government regulation, in 1968 he was made a Knight Bachelor "In recognition of service to commerce". He continued serving on the council until his retirement aged 88 in 1973. Survived by his two sons and a daughter, he died aged 90 on 18 July 1975 at Paddington and was cremated.

Political offices
Preceded by Sir Henry Manning	Leader of the Opposition of New South Wales in the Legislative Council; 1960 – 1962	Succeeded by Arthur Bridges
