= Alan McNamara =

Australian politician

Alan William McNamara (29 December 1900 – 5 May 1955) was an Australian politician.

He was born in Parramatta to army officer Michael McNamara and Matilda Stella Lawson. He was involved in the organisation of the United Labourers' Union, serving as its general secretary and state president. On 28 February 1942 he married May Doreen Post; they had two sons. He was a Labor member of the New South Wales Legislative Council from 1931 to 1934 and from 1937 until his death at Eastwood in 1955.
