= Archibald Howie (politician) =

Australian politician

The Honourable Sir Archibald Howie JP

62nd Lord Mayor of Sydney
- In office 1 January 1936 – 31 December 1937
- Preceded by: Arthur McElhone
- Succeeded by: Sir Norman Nock

Alderman of the Sydney City Council
- In office 3 December 1934 – 5 December 1941
- Constituency: Macquarie Ward

Member of the New South Wales Legislative Council
- In office 23 April 1934 – 26 October 1943
- Succeeded by: Samuel Williams

Personal details
- Born: 12 May 1879 Glasgow, Lanarkshire, Scotland, United Kingdom
- Died: 26 October 1943 (aged 64) Hunters Hill, New South Wales, Australia
- Party: Civic Reform; United Australia Party
- Spouse(s): Emily Clara Manuelle (m. 1912–1943; his death)

Sir Archibald Howie JP (12 May 1879 – 26 October 1943) was a Scottish-born Australian politician.

== Early life ==
He was born in Glasgow to mason Archibald Howie and Janet Ferguson. His family migrated to New South Wales in 1881, and Howie became a building contractor, eventually taking over his father's business. In 1912 he married Emily Clara Manuelle, with whom he had a son. In 1927 he was elected for a single term as President of the Master Builders Association of New South Wales.

== Political career ==
From 1934 to 1941 he was a member of Sydney City Council, and from 1934 to 1943 he was a United Australia Party member of the New South Wales Legislative Council. He was knighted in the 1938 New Year Honours. In 1939 he was appointed a Fellow of the Senate of the University of Sydney, serving until his death. He was president of the Royal Agricultural Society of New South Wales from 1941 until his death.

Howie died at his Hunters Hill residence, "Clifton" in Woolwich Road, which had been his home since 1919, on 26 October 1943. His funeral was held at St Stephen's Presbyterian Church on Macquarie Street and he was buried in South Head Cemetery.

Professional and academic associations
Preceded by Alexander Speers	President of the Master Builders Association of New South Wales; 1927–1928	Succeeded by Frederick William Lemcke
Business positions
Preceded by Archibald Howie	Chairman of Howie Moffat & Co; 1932–1943	Succeeded by H. W. Knight
Preceded by Hunter McPherson	Chairman of the Port Jackson and Manly Steamship Company; 1932–1943	Succeeded by Handel Norman Pope
Preceded by R. J. Hawkes	President of the Sydney Chamber of Commerce; 1938–1940	Succeeded by Albert Edward Heath
Civic offices
Preceded by Arthur McElhone	Lord Mayor of Sydney; 1936–1937	Succeeded by Sir Norman Nock
Non-profit organization positions
Preceded by Sir Samuel Hordern	President of the Royal Agricultural Society of New South Wales; 1941–1943	Succeeded by Colin Sinclair
