= Keith Brooks (Australian politician) =

Australian politician

Keith Gregory Brooks (30 July 1888 – 29 August 1955) was an Australian politician.

He was born in Newcastle to ship owner Thomas Brooks and Emily Elizabeth Lowe. He attended Sydney Church of England Grammar School and spent a year as a jackaroo before opening an export and import business in 1909. From 1910 to 1913 he was a Newcastle alderman. On 1 July 1916 he married Hilda Constance Brand, with whom he had a daughter. From 1939 to 1946 he was a member of the New South Wales Legislative Council, representing the United Australia Party and then the Liberal Party. Brooks died at Wahroonga in 1955.
