= John O'Regan (politician) =

Australian politician

John Francis O'Regan (8 February 1877 – 28 October 1940) was an Australian politician.

He was born in Batlow to carrier Jeremiah O'Regan and Honoriah Hourigan. He attended the local public school and then went to New Zealand as a miner, returning in 1898 to become a butcher in Wagga Wagga. On 21 October 1903 he married Jenny Quinlivan, with whom he had seven children. He was a Wagga Wagga alderman from 1906 to 1912 and from 1916 to 1920. From 1921 to 1940 he was a Labor member of the New South Wales Legislative Council. In the 1930s he opposed Jack Lang and sat as Federal Labor. O'Regan died in Wagga Wagga in 1940.
