= John Martin (Australian politician) =

Australian politician

John Bertie Martin (16 October 1890 – 14 March 1964) was an Australian politician.

He was born in Waverley to engineer John Martin and Maria Theresa McArdle. He was a telephonist in the Postmaster-General's Department from 1904 to 1912, and in 1910 married Elizabeth Louise Smith, with whom she had two children. Active in the Federated Clerks' Union, he was its secretary and president from 1916 to 1928, and from 1930 to 1939 was organising secretary of the Labor Party. From 1931 to 1946 he was a Labor member of the New South Wales Legislative Council. When he died at Camperdown in 1964, Martin was the state secretary of the Australian Funeral Directors' Association.
