= Joseph Coates (politician) =

Australian politician

Joseph Farrar Coates (21 September 1878 – 4 May 1943) was an Australian politician.

He was born in Bathurst to commercial agent James Farrar Coates and Honorah Mahony. He was educated at St Aloysius' College in Sydney and became a commercial traveller; he also owned property at Bathurst. On 17 March 1899 he married Mary Teresa Hinchy, with whom he had four children. In 1902 he was a foundation member of the Shop Assistants Union, and in 1910 he ran unsuccessfully as the Labor Party candidate for the state seat of Bathurst. In 1921 he was appointed to the New South Wales Legislative Council. He was a minister without portfolio from 1925 to 1927 and led the Labor Party in the council from 1927, but was an opponent of Jack Lang and led the Federal Labor group in the council from 1931 to 1932. He returned to the main Labor fold later in the 1930s, and remained in the council until his death at Haberfield in 1943.
