= Marsden Manfred =

Australian politician

Marsden Erle Manfred (31 December 1888 – 26 February 1951) was an Australian politician.

He was born in Goulburn to architect Edmund Cooper Manfred and Ellen Wagstaffe. He attended King's College in Goulburn and became a solicitor, practising locally. On 13 October 1917, he married Mildred Ann Reynolds, with whom he had one son; a later marriage, on 26 November 1942, was to Lynda Mabel Rice. He was an alderman at Goulburn from 1924 to 1929, and served as a member of the New South Wales Legislative Council from 1934 to 1949, first for the United Australia Party and then for the Liberal Party. He was an assistant minister from 1939 to 1941 and served as acting Minister for Justice for sixteen days in March 1941. Manfred died at Goulburn in 1951.
