= Arthur Colvin =

Australian politician

- Born: 24 April 1884; Jamberoo, New South Wales
- Died: 20 August 1966; Potts Point, New South Wales
- Education: Newington College; The King's School; University of Sydney; Royal Australasian College of Surgeons
- Occupations: Member of new south wales legislative council soldier, surgeon and physician
- Title: The Hon. Colonel Arthur Colvin CBE MC MLC
- Spouse: Edith Jaques née Stack
- Children: No issue
- Parent(s): Rev. Edmund Alexander Colvin and Gertrude Elizabeth Reynolds née Huntley

Colonel Arthur Edmund Colvin CBE MC (24 April 1884 – 20 August 1966) was a member of New South Wales Legislative Council and a soldier, surgeon, and physician.

== Early life ==
Colvin was born in Jamberoo, New South Wales and was the son of the Rev. Edmund Alexander Colvin and Gertrude Elizabeth Reynolds née Huntley. He was educated at Auburn public school, Newington College (1897–1898), The King's School (1898–1902) and the University of Sydney. He graduated as a Bachelor of Medicine and Chirurgery in 1908.

== Medical career ==
Following graduation, Colvin was appointed as a resident medical officer at Sydney Hospital and as a pathologist in the following year. He then went into general practice in Orange, New South Wales later specialising in ophthalmic surgery. Colvin was honorary surgeon to HRH Prince Albert, Duke of York, during his in 1927 Australian tour and to HRH Prince Henry, Duke of Gloucester, on his 1934 tour. He was secretary of NSW Western Division of British Medical Association. From 1929 he was a member of the NSW Hospital Commission and served as its vice chairman in 1934. In 1937 he was appointed to the Medical Board of New South Wales and from 1944 until 1966 he served on the board of Sydney Hospital.

== Military service ==
During World War I Colvin served with the field ambulance unit and on administrative staff of the Australian Army Medical Corps of the Australian Imperial Force in Egypt, the United Kingdom, and France. He rose to the rank of major and was awarded the Military Cross and mentioned in despatches. During World War II he was assistant director general of Army Medical Services and an adviser on medical and hospital matters to the director general of Manpower and was promoted to colonel.

== Local Government service ==
Colvin served as an alderman on Orange City Council from 1921 until 1941 and was mayor from 1923 until 1930 and again in 1935.

== Parliamentary service ==
As a member of the New South Wales Legislative Council, Colvin served from 1932 until 1934 as a life appointment under the Constitution Act and the writ of summons of 7 September 1932. He became an indirectly elected member of the Council in April 1934 and served for 21 years. On retirement he was granted the retention of the title of The Honourable for life.

== Community involvement ==
Colvin served on the boards of the Far West Children's Health Scheme, Legacy Australia and The Spastic Centre. He was a member of the Orange Agricultural and Pastoral Society and a councillor of Fairbridge Farm Schools.

== Honours ==
- Commander of the Order of the British Empire – 1935, for service as chairman of the Hospital Commission of NSW.
