= Hugh Wragge =

Australian politician (1882–1954)

Hugh Moffitt Wragge (11 October 1882 – 17 March 1954) was an Australian politician.

He was born in Sydney to storekeeper William Bullock Wragge and Margaret Jane Nixon. A solicitor from 1908, he settled in Gunnedah where he had a practice. On 5 April 1911 he married Margaret Thom Wildridge, with whom he had two daughters. From 1932 to 1949 he was a Country Party member of the New South Wales Legislative Council. Wragge died in a fall at the Hotel Metropole in Sydney in 1954.
