= Frederick Kneeshaw =

New Zealand-born Australian politician

Frederick Percival Kneeshaw OBE (6 August 1883 – 3 February 1955) was an Australian politician.

He was born in Canterbury, New Zealand, the son of John Kneeshaw and Annie Gleeson. In 1891 he moved to Sydney, where he attended Sydney Technical College and became an engineer, initially with the tramway. He served in the 6th Field Artillery Brigade during World War I, serving in Egypt, France and Belgium and being mentioned in despatches in 1916. He attained the rank of major, but was wounded in 1917 and discharged as medically unfit. A general manager of the Kandos Cement Company from 1922, he was a member of the New South Wales Legislative Council from 1934 to 1949, first as a member of the United Australia Party and then for the Liberal Party. Kneeshaw died at Killara in 1955.
