= James Graves (New South Wales politician) =

Australian politician

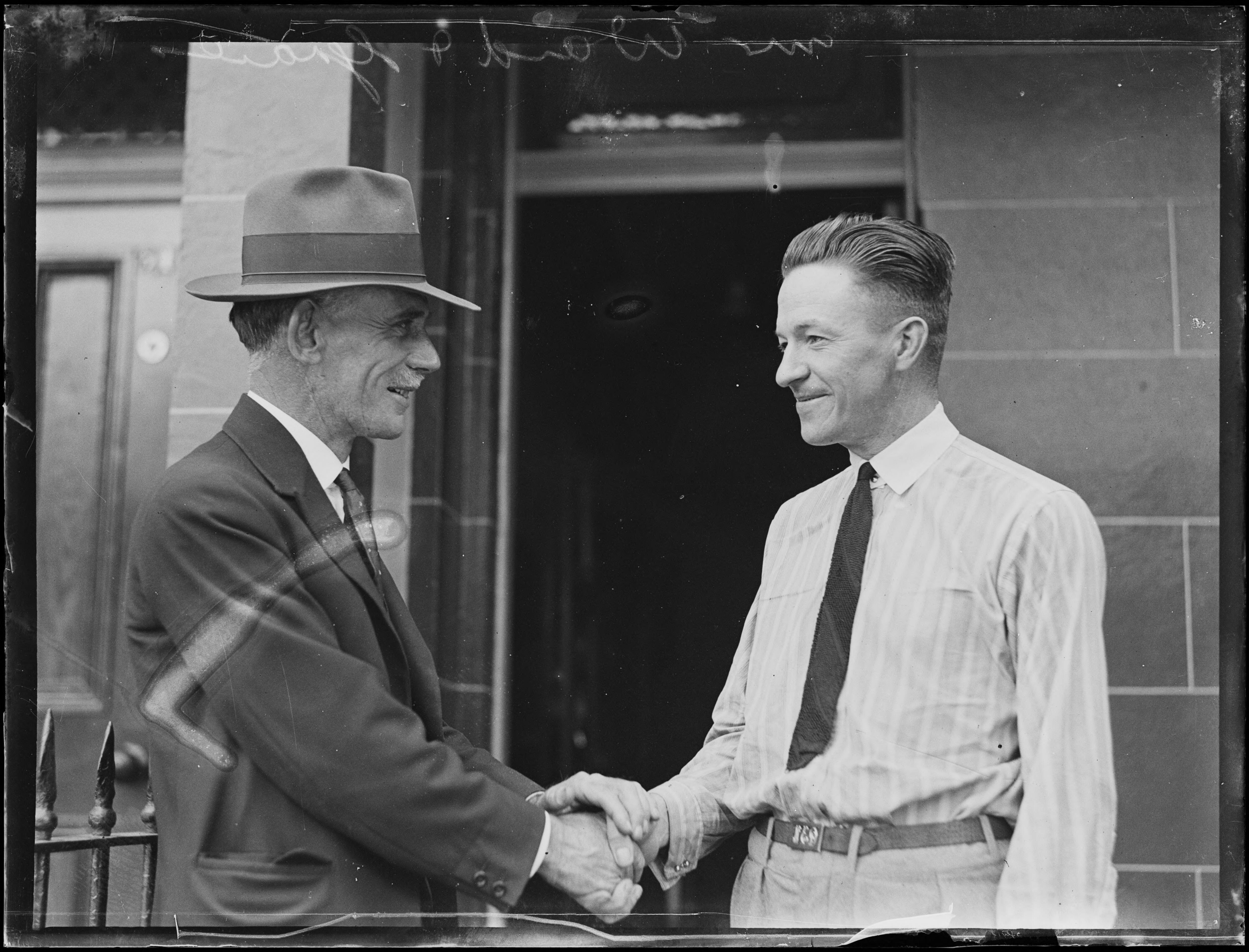
Graves (left) congratulating Eddie Ward following the 1931 East Sydney by-election

James Joseph Graves (23 June 1882 – 22 January 1964) was an Australian politician.

He was born at Waverley to bookkeeper James Joseph Graves and Elizabeth Dobson. He was educated by the Marist Brothers at Darlinghurst and became an apprentice fitter at the age of fifteen. On 21 February 1901 he married Edith May Sessle, with whom he had ten children. He had joined the Labor Party in 1900 and in 1906 was a foundation member of the Stovemakers' Union, of which he was secretary from 1913 to 1930. In 1919 he was a member of the Industrial Socialist Labor Party, but he was back in the official Labor fold by 1923, when he was elected a member of the central executive; he would serve as its president from 1927 to 1930 and secretary from 1930 to 1939. In 1931 he was appointed to the New South Wales Legislative Council. He was expelled from the Labor Party in 1946, but was readmitted in 1947. He left the Council in 1961 and died at Kirrawee in 1964.
