= Alfred Binks =

Australian politician

Alfred Noble Binks (11 October 1873 – 31 July 1953) was an Australian politician.

He was born at Broughton Village near Gerringong to dairy farmer Thomas Binks and Mary Hetherington. He attended public schools at Broughton Vale and Cambewarra and became a dairy farmer, serving as a Gerringong alderman from 1920 to 1929. On 18 January 1908 he married Louisa Cashman, with whom he had two children. From 1932 to 1952 he was a member of the New South Wales Legislative Council, first as a member of the United Australia Party and then as a Liberal. Binks died at Broughton Village in 1953.
