= George Archer (politician) =

Australian politician (1881–1956)

George Stacher Archer (4 April 1881 – 8 August 1956) was an Australian politician.

He was born in Launceston, Tasmania, to tin miner Richard Frederick Archer and Mary Ann Hagon. He attended school in Hobart and became a furniture maker. On 28 December 1904 he married Elise Letita Cosker, with whom he had two children. From around 1920 he was organising secretary of the Furnishing Trades Union and, having moved to New South Wales, he was involved in the Labor Party. From 1925 to 1949 he was a Labor member of the New South Wales Legislative Council. Archer died in Sydney in 1956.
