= Thomas Armstrong (Australian politician) =

Australian politician

Thomas Armstrong (26 December 1885 – 13 June 1955) was an English-born Australian politician.

He was born in Durham, the son of miner Thomas Armstrong. He arrived in Australia around 1887 and attended school at Wickham, later joining a colliery firm as a junior clerk. On 2 December 1908 he married Anice Pepper, with whom he had three children. He was a Wickham alderman from 1917 to 1920, serving as mayor in 1919, and eventually rose to the position of general manager of his firm. From 1935 to 1955 he was a member of the New South Wales Legislative Council, first for the United Australia Party and then for the Liberal Party. Armstrong died in Newcastle in 1955.
