= Colin Tannock =

Scottish-born Australian politician

The Honourable Colin Tannock MLC
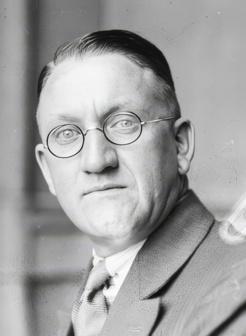
- Tannock in the 1930s

Member of the New South Wales Legislative Council
- In office 24 November 1931 – 22 April 1952

President of the Federated Ironworkers' Union
- In office 1924–1926
- In office 1953–1955

Personal details
- Born: Colin Campbell Kennedy Tannock; 2 April 1891 Maryhill, Lanarkshire, Scotland, UK
- Died: 1 November 1972 (aged 81) Terrey Hills, Sydney, NSW, Australia
- Party: Labor
- Spouse: Mary Anderson (m. 1915)

Colin Campbell Kennedy Tannock (2 April 1891 – 1 November 1972) was a Scottish-born Australian politician.

== Early life ==
He was born at Maryhill in Lanarkshire to gasfitter James Tannock and Euphemia Kennedy.

== Career ==
Having migrated to New South Wales, he worked as an ironworker and was president of the Ironworkers' Union from 1924 to 1926, state secretary from 1926 to 19456, and president from 1955, as well as a delegate to the Australian Council of Trade Unions.

== Politics ==
Tannock served as the President of Langlea branch of the Labor Party.

Tannock was elected to the New South Wales Legislative Council in 1931 and remained a member when the council was changed to be indirectly elected in 1934. He left the Council in 1952 after failing to win preselection.

== Personal life ==
Tannock married Mary Elizabeth Anderson on the 28th of January 1915 at St David’s Anglican Church in Surry Hills, Sydney.

Tannock was an Anglican.

== Death ==
Tannock died of acute myocardial infarction in Sydney in 1972 at a retirement home in Terrey Hills, Sydney.
