= Frederick Tout =

Australian politician

The Honourable Sir Frederick Tout

Member of New South Wales Legislative Council
- In office 27 October 1932 – 22 April 1934
- Appointed by: Sir Philip Game
- In office 23 April 1934 – 22 April 1946

Personal details
- Born: 13 January 1873 Calabash near Young, Colony of New South Wales
- Died: 4 July 1950 (aged 77) Darlinghurst, New South Wales, Australia
- Spouse(s): Minnie Agnes (née Abigail) died 1942; Marie Gwendoline Glennie
- Children: 1 daughter and 2 sons
- Education: Newington College
- Occupation: Solicitor & Grazier

Frederick Henry Tout (13 January 1873 – 4 July 1950) was an Australian solicitor, pastoralist, businessman and politician who was a member of the New South Wales Legislative Council for 14 years. He was president of the Bank of New South Wales.

== Early life ==
Tout was born in Calabash near Young, New South Wales, the son of Samuel Tout, grazier, and Sarah née Kelly. He attended Fort Street Model School and Newington College (1886–1890) where he was Captain of rugby union.

== Career ==
Tout was admitted as a solicitor in 1897 and married in the same year. He practised as a solicitor in Sydney and Boorowa, New South Wales, until 1907. After taking over a part of his father's property he became a successful farmer, grazier and breeder of Aberdeen Angus. He was a member of the Burrangong Shire Council from 1911 to 1922, 1923–1924, and again from 1936 to 1937. Tout was active in a broad range of rural and local activities — he was secretary of the Pastoralists' Association 1928–1930 — and from the 1930s he became a force in conservative State politics. In 1932 he attended the Imperial Economic Conference, Ottawa, and in 1933 became president of the Australian Economic Advisory Council. From 1932 until 1946 he was a member of the NSW Upper House. In business he served as a director of the Australian Mutual Provident Society, Goldsbrough Mort & Co., the Graziers' Co-operative Shearing Co. Ltd, Associated Newspapers Ltd, Expeditionary Films (1933) Ltd, the McGarvie Smith Institute and the Commercial Union Assurance Company. Tout was Knighted in the 1935 Birthday Honours.

From 1945 until 1950 he was president of the Bank of New South Wales. After the death of his first wife he married again in 1945. Tout was survived by her, and by two sons and a daughter of his first marriage.

Business positions
Preceded by Sir Robert Gillespie	President of the Bank of New South Wales; 1945–1950	Succeeded by Martin McIlrath
