= Horace Whiddon =

Australian politician

Horace William Whiddon (21 February 1879 – 11 May 1955) was an Australian politician.

He was born in Sydney, the son of Samuel Thomas Whiddon. He attended Fort Street High School and became a wool merchant. On 25 July 1908 he married Lillian Curnow, with whom he had one son. He was in business with his brother and served as managing director of their wool manufacturing and export company. From 1934 to 1955 he was a member of the New South Wales Legislative Council, first representing the United Australia Party and then the Liberal Party. Whiddon died in Burwood in 1955.
