= George Mullins (politician) =

Australian politician

- Born: 26 August 1879; Ballarat, New South Wales, Australia
- Died: 5 July 1948 (aged 68); Manly, New South Wales, Australia
- Occupation(s): Bootmaker; Wharf labourer Trade union leader Politician
- Spouse: Florence Emily Gray (m. 1907)
- Relatives: George Mullins Jr (son)

George Mullins (26 August 1879 – 5 July 1948) was an Australian politician.

He was born in Ballarat to John and Jane Agnes Mullins, and became a bootmaker. After losing his job for striking, he held a variety of jobs and travelled to South Africa and New Zealand, where on 15 July 1907 he married Florence Emily Gray (they had one son). He returned to New South Wales in 1910 and became a wharf labourer. A member of the Waterside Workers' Federation, he was secretary of the local branch from 1931 to 1948. He served as mayor of Balmain in 1924. From 1931 to 1948, Mullins was a Labor member of the New South Wales Legislative Council. He died at Manly in 1948.
