= James Concannon =

Australian politician

James Matthew Concannon (10 November 1890 – 8 August 1973) was an Australian politician.

He was born in Sydney to Irish migrant Bartholomew Concannon and Margaret Gilmore. He attended Marist Brothers' College in Darlinghurst and from 1907 to 1927 was a clerk with the Metropolitan Water Sewerage and Drainage Board. In June 1915 he married Arline Clarke, with whom he had three daughters; he would later marry Mary Murielle McBryde on 30 June 1962. In 1925 he was appointed to the New South Wales Legislative Council in 1925, and was soon also secretary of the New South Wales Public Service Professional Officers' Association. From 1931 to 1941 he led the Labor Party in the upper house. He retired in 1958 having lost preselection, and died in Bondi in 1973.
