= Graham Waddell =

Australian politician

Sir Charles Graham Waddell KBE (7 January 1877 – 7 April 1960) was an Australian politician.

He was born in Orange to bank manager Colonel George Walker Waddell and Fanny Elizabeth Sharpe. He attended Sydney Grammar School and worked as a bookkeeper and overseer near Adelong before becoming a grazier at Bethungra. He was president of the Graziers' Association from 1925 to 1928 and chairman of the Australian Woolgrowers' Council from 1925 to 1935. In the 1927 Birthday Honours he was appointed a Knight Commander of the Order of the British Empire (KBE).

In 1936 he was elected to a 12 year term as a Country Party member of the New South Wales Legislative Council, serving from 1937 until 1949.

Waddell died at Potts Point in 1960 (aged 83).

His uncle Thomas Waddell was also a member of Legislative Assembly and briefly Premier, and his cousin John Waddell was the member for Waverley in the Legislative Assembly from 1932 until 1939.
