= Alexander Alam =

Australian politician

- Born: 23 February 1896; Wallsend, New South Wales, Australia
- Died: 9 August 1983 (aged 87)
- Education: De La Salle College Armidale
- Occupations: Businessman; Politician; Philanthropist
- Spouse: Therese (Anthony) Alam
- Parent(s): Joseph Alam; Mary (Hashem) Alam

Anthony Alexander Alam (23 February 1896 – 9 August 1983) was an Australian businessman, politician and philanthropist. He was one of the longest-serving members of the New South Wales Legislative Council, and a prominent member of the Lebanese community.

== Biography ==
=== Early life ===
Alam was born on 23 January 1896 in Wallsend. His parents were immigrant Lebanese storekeepers, Joseph Alam and Mary née Hashem. He was educated at De La Salle College Armidale. He married Therese Anthony (daughter of W. Anthony) at St. Columbia's Church, Charters Towers, Queensland, on 26 April 1924.

=== Political career ===
He was an active in the Labor Party, and served as president of that Party's Gwydir, Dubbo and Wammerawa branches. He represented Labor in the New South Wales Legislative Council from 21 December 1925 until 22 April 1958, when he retired from that position. He later filled a casual vacancy caused by the resignation of Ian Sinclair from 19 November 1963 until 22 April 1973, when he again retired. He was therefore an MLC for over forty-one years. In doing so, he was one of the very earliest people with Asian ancestry to be represented in any Australian legislature.

=== Honours ===
He was appointed to the National Order of the Cedar (Lebanon), the Order of Nichan Iftikhar, the Légion d’honneur (France) and the Order of the Phoenix (Greece).

=== Death ===
He died on August 9, 1983 (aged 87).
