= Norman William Kater =

Australian politician

Sir Norman William Kater MB, ChM (18 November 1874 – 18 August 1965) was a medical practitioner, pastoralist and member of the New South Wales Legislative Council. He was born into a socially prominent rural family. His father Henry Kater also was a member of the Legislative Council, and his grandfather William Forster was Premier of New South Wales. He served as a member of the Legislative Council for 30 years, from 1921 to 1955. He was educated at All Saints College, Bathurst, and Sydney Grammar School. He read medicine at the University of Sydney He served during first world war with the Red Cross and was appointed a Chevalier de La Legion d'Honneur. He also served as the President of the Australian Club.

His commercial appointments included the Chairman of Co-operative Wool and Produce Co. Ltd, and a director of the Colonial Sugar Refining Company (1924–49), the Graziers' Co-operative Shearing Co Ltd (Grazcos) (from 1919), Globe Worsted Mills Ltd (from 1927) and Newcastle-Wallsend Coal Company (from 1933). He was president of the Graziers' Association of New South Wales 1922–1927.

Kater was knighted in 1929 for his service as "Chairman of the Federal Pastoral Advisory Committee".

His grandson Dugald Munro, was a member of federal parliament.
