= Hugh Latimer (politician) =

Australian politician

Hugh Latimer (8 October 1896 – 10 May 1954) was an Australian politician.

He was born in Woollahra, the son of William Fleming Latimer. Educated at a local public school and then at Fort Street High School, he became an accountant. On 8 November 1919 he married Jean McClelland; they had one son. From 1923 to 1954 he was a Woollahra alderman, serving as mayor from 1932 to 1935 and from 1949 to 1951. From 1934 to 1954 he served as a member of the New South Wales Legislative Council, first for the United Australia Party and then as a Liberal. He died at Woollahra in 1954.
