= Thomas Alfred John Playfair =

Australian politician, military officer and meat exporter

Brigadier Thomas Alfred Playfair DSO, OBE, VD

Member of the New South Wales Legislative Council
- In office 8 November 1927 – 9 August 1966

Personal details
- Born: 13 October 1890 Millers Point, New South Wales
- Died: 9 August 1966 (aged 75) Darlinghurst, New South Wales
- Party: Nationalist Party (1927–31); United Australia Party (1931–45); Liberal Party (from 1945)
- Relatives: Thomas Playfair (grandfather); Judy Playfair (granddaughter); Wendy Playfair (niece)
- Occupation: Merchant; ship's providore; politician; military

Military service
- Allegiance: Australia
- Branch/service: Citizen Military Forces; Australian Imperial Force
- Years of service: 1910–1929; 1940–1942
- Rank: Brigadier
- Battles/wars: First World War; Second World War
- Awards: Distinguished Service Order; Officer of the Order of the British Empire; Volunteer Officers' Decoration; Mentioned in Despatches (3)

Brigadier Thomas Alfred John Playfair, DSO, OBE, VD (13 October 1890 – 9 August 1966) was an Australian politician, military officer and meat exporter. He served as a member of the New South Wales Legislative Council.

== Early life ==
Known throughout his life as "Jack", Playfair was born at Millers Point to shipping providore and meat exporter Edmund John Playfair and Edith Creer. His grandfather John Thomas Playfair had founded a successful wholesale meat business in The Rocks, Sydney provisioning Sydney's shipping trade. Jack Playfair attended Sydney Church of England Grammar School and learned the meat trade at the Smithfield Meat Market in London in 1906 before returning to the family business in Sydney – Thomas Playfair Ltd.

== Military career ==
In 1910, Playfair enlisted as a gunner in the Australian Field Artillery (New South Wales). He was promoted to lieutenant in 1913.

From 1914 to 1919, Playfair served in the Australian Imperial Force. He was first with the 1st Field Artillery at Gallipoli, where he was seriously wounded, and then served in the 7th Field Artillery in France. He was mentioned in despatches three times, awarded the Distinguished Service Order and the Volunteer Officers' Decoration, and achieved the rank of major. On his return, he was appointed an Officer of the Order of the British Empire.

He transferred to the reserve in 1942. In the Second World War, he commanded the 2nd Division's Artillery unit and was promoted to brigadier.

== Business and politics ==
From 1914 to 1915, he was an alderman on Waverley Council. From 1927 to 1966, he was a member of the New South Wales Legislative Council, representing successively the Nationalist Party, the United Australia Party and the Liberal Party.

By 1926, he was chairman of directors of the firm founded by his grandfather. He modernised the plant and added a smallgoods factory which enabled the firm during the Second World War to become the largest supplier of canned sausages to the AIF and to the US forces in the Pacific.

== Personal life ==
Playfair married Madge Hardy in London on 29 August 1918; they had four children. He died at Darlinghurst, New South Wales, in 1966.
