= Electoral results for the district of Bulli =

Election result for Bulli, New South Wales, Australia

Bulli, an electoral district of the Legislative Assembly in the Australian state of New South Wales had two incarnations, from 1930 until 1971 and from 1991 until 1999.

First incarnation (1930–1971)
Election	Member	Party
1930	Andrew Lysaght	Labor
1932	Andrew Lysaght	Labor (NSW)
1933 by	John Sweeney	Labor (NSW)
1935	John Sweeney	Labor (NSW)
1938	John Sweeney	Labor
1941	John Sweeney	Labor
1944	John Sweeney	Labor
1947	Laurie Kelly	Labor
1950	Laurie Kelly	Labor
1953	Laurie Kelly	Labor
1955 by	Rex Jackson	Labor
1956	Rex Jackson	Labor
1959	Rex Jackson	Labor
1962	Rex Jackson	Labor
1965	Rex Jackson	Labor
1968	Rex Jackson	Labor
Second incarnation (1991–1999)
Election	Member	Party
1991	Ian McManus	Labor
1995	Ian McManus	Labor

== Election results ==
=== Elections in the 1990s ===
==== 1995 ====
1995 New South Wales state election: Bulli
Party	Candidate	Votes	%	±%
Labor	Ian McManus	18,137	50.8	−1.4
Liberal	Roy Stanton	11,860	33.2	+2.2
Greens	Steve Allen	4,193	11.7	+4.0
Call to Australia	Nicole White	1,544	4.3	+0.9
Total formal votes		35,734	96.2	+2.2
Informal votes		1,421	3.8	−2.2
Turnout		37,155	94.8	
Two-party-preferred result
Labor	Ian McManus	21,006	61.3	−1.9
Liberal	Roy Stanton	13,263	38.7	+1.9
Labor hold		Swing	−1.9	

==== 1991 ====
1991 New South Wales state election: Bulli
Party	Candidate	Votes	%	±%
Labor	Ian McManus	17,189	52.2	+1.6
Liberal	Cheryl Hill	10,220	31.0	−9.7
Greens	Carole Medcalf	2,553	7.7	+7.7
Democrats	Greg O'Brien	1,861	5.6	+1.9
Call to Australia	Colin Scott	1,132	3.4	+3.4
Total formal votes		32,955	93.9	−3.1
Informal votes		2,131	6.1	+3.1
Turnout		35,086	94.5	
Two-party-preferred result
Labor	Ian McManus	19,344	63.2	+6.9
Liberal	Cheryl Hill	11,263	36.8	−6.9
Labor notional hold		Swing	+6.9	

Bulli was a new seat with a notional Labor majority.

District recreated

==== 1971 - 1991 ====
District abolished

=== Elections in the 1960s ===
==== 1968 ====
1968 New South Wales state election: Bulli
Party	Candidate	Votes	%	±%
Labor	Rex Jackson	13,419	64.5	+7.3
Liberal	Ronald White	7,395	35.5	+6.8
Total formal votes		20,814	97.5	
Informal votes		541	2.5	
Turnout		21,355	95.1	
Labor hold		Swing	−2.5	

==== 1965 ====
1965 New South Wales state election: Bulli
Party	Candidate	Votes	%	±%
Labor	Rex Jackson	13,654	57.2	−11.1
Liberal	Donald Heggie	6,847	28.7	+2.0
Independent	Mary Hargrave	2,388	10.0	+10.0
Communist	Sara Bowen	988	4.1	−1.0
Total formal votes		23,877	97.9	−0.6
Informal votes		505	2.1	+0.6
Turnout		24,382	95.2	+0.7
Two-party-preferred result
Labor	Rex Jackson	15,996	67.0	−5.3
Liberal	Donald Heggie	7,881	33.0	+5.3
Labor hold		Swing	−5.3	

==== 1962 ====
1962 New South Wales state election: Bulli
Party	Candidate	Votes	%	±%
Labor	Rex Jackson	14,424	68.2	+2.5
Liberal	Donald Heggie	5,636	26.7	−2.7
Communist	Sara Bowen	1,074	5.1	+0.3
Total formal votes		21,134	98.5	
Informal votes		316	1.5	
Turnout		21,450	94.5	
Two-party-preferred result
Labor	Rex Jackson	15,283	72.3	+2.7
Liberal	Donald Heggie	5,851	27.7	−2.7
Labor hold		Swing	+2.7	

=== Elections in the 1950s ===
==== 1959 ====
1959 New South Wales state election: Bulli
Party	Candidate	Votes	%	±%
Labor	Rex Jackson	13,168	65.7	
Liberal	Donald Heggie	5,897	29.4	
Communist	Frederick Watson	965	4.8	
Total formal votes		20,030	98.3	
Informal votes		355	1.7	
Turnout		20,385	94.3	
Two-party-preferred result
Labor	Rex Jackson	13,940	69.6	
Liberal	Donald Heggie	6,090	30.4	
Labor hold		Swing		

==== 1956 ====
1956 New South Wales state election: Bulli
Party	Candidate	Votes	%	±%
Labor	Rex Jackson	11,812	60.8	−27.1
Liberal	Donald Heggie	6,508	33.5	+33.5
Communist	Bill McDougall	1,101	5.7	−6.4
Total formal votes		19,421	98.8	+4.8
Informal votes		227	1.2	−4.8
Turnout		19,648	93.7	−0.6
Two-party-preferred result
Labor	Rex Jackson	12,803	65.9	−22.0
Liberal	Donald Heggie	6,618	34.1	+34.1
Labor hold		Swing	N/A	

==== 1955 by-election ====
1955 Bulli by-election Saturday 9 July
Party	Candidate	Votes	%	±%
Labor	Rex Jackson	8,726	51.1	−36.8
Liberal	Lewis Jaratt	3,811	22.3	
Independent Labor	Leslie Strachan	3,359	19.7	
Communist	Leonard Boardman	1,187	7.0	−5.2
Total formal votes		17,083	98.4	
Informal votes		276	1.6	
Turnout		17,359	85.5	
Labor hold		Swing	N/A	

Laurie Kelly (Labor) died. Preferences were not distributed.

==== 1953 ====
1953 New South Wales state election: Bulli
Party	Candidate	Votes	%	±%
Labor	Laurie Kelly	14,480	87.9	
Communist	Sara Phipps	1,994	12.1	
Total formal votes		16,474	94.0	
Informal votes		1,054	6.0	
Turnout		17,528	94.3	
Labor hold		Swing		

==== 1950 ====
1950 New South Wales state election: Bulli
Party	Candidate	Votes	%	±%
Labor	Laurie Kelly	9,963	62.0	
Liberal	Leslie Strachan	4,688	29.2	
Communist	John Martin	1,422	8.8	
Total formal votes		16,073	98.5	
Informal votes		249	1.5	
Turnout		16,322	94.3	
Two-party-preferred result
Labor	Laurie Kelly		69.0 (Note: Two party preferred vote was estimated.)	
Liberal	Leslie Strachan		31.0	
Labor hold		Swing		

=== Elections in the 1940s ===
==== 1947 ====
1947 New South Wales state election: Bulli
Party	Candidate	Votes	%	±%
Labor	Laurie Kelly	8,517	58.5	+10.1
Independent Labor	Hector MacKay	3,117	21.4	+21.4
Communist	John Martin	2,937	20.2	−10.6
Total formal votes		14,571	97.0	+1.4
Informal votes		449	3.0	−1.4
Turnout		15,020	95.5	+3.0
Labor hold		Swing	N/A	

- Preferences were not distributed.

==== 1944 ====
1944 New South Wales state election: Bulli
Party	Candidate	Votes	%	±%
Labor	John Sweeney	6,305	48.4	−26.3
Communist	John Martin	4,016	30.8	+30.8
Independent Labor	Lawrence Baines	2,049	15.7	+15.7
Independent Labor	Maurice Twomey	659	5.1	+5.1
Total formal votes		13,029	95.6	+1.4
Informal votes		596	4.4	−1.4
Turnout		13,625	92.5	−0.7
After distribution of preferences
Labor	John Sweeney	6,568	50.4	
Communist	John Martin	4,121	31.6	
Independent Labor	Lawrence Baines	2,340	18.0	
Labor hold		Swing	N/A	

- Preferences were not distributed to completion.

==== 1941 ====
1941 New South Wales state election: Bulli
Party	Candidate	Votes	%	±%
Labor	John Sweeney	9,308	74.7	
State Labor	Alfred Burgess	3,157	25.3	
Total formal votes		12,556	94.2	
Informal votes		676	5.8	
Turnout		13,232	93.0	
Labor hold		Swing		

=== Elections in the 1930s ===
==== 1938 ====
1938 New South Wales state election: Bulli
Party	Candidate	Votes	%	±%
Labor	John Sweeney	7,380	54.6	−26.1
Independent	Edward Ryan	3,413	25.2	+25.2
Communist	Jack Miles	2,731	20.2	+0.9
Total formal votes		13,524	95.4	+13.7
Informal votes		655	4.6	−13.7
Turnout		14,179	95.1	−1.3
Labor hold		Swing	N/A	

- Preferences were not distributed.

==== 1935 ====
1935 New South Wales state election: Bulli
Party	Candidate	Votes	%	±%
Labor (NSW)	John Sweeney	8,382	80.7	+17.9
Communist	Patrick McHenry	2,002	19.3	+16.0
Total formal votes		10,384	81.7	−17.1
Informal votes		2,323	18.3	+17.1
Turnout		12,707	96.4	−0.9
Labor (NSW) hold		Swing	N/A	

==== 1933 by-election ====
1933 Bulli state by-election
Party	Candidate	Votes	%	±%
Labor	John Sweeney	5,376	45.5	−17.3
United Australia	Arthur Butterell	3,084	26.1	−4.0
Miners	Albert Willis	2,783	23.5	+23.5
Communist	Paul Martin	586	5.0	+1.7
Total formal votes		11,829	98.9	+0.1
Informal votes		136	1.1	−0.1
Turnout		11,965	92.0	−5.3
Two-party-preferred result
Labor	John Sweeney	7,734	65.4	+65.4
United Australia	Arthur Butterell	4,095	34.6	+34.6
Labor hold		Swing	N/A	

==== 1932 ====
1932 New South Wales state election: Bulli
Party	Candidate	Votes	%	±%
Labor (NSW)	Andrew Lysaght	7,590	62.8	−16.4
United Australia	Robert Roberts	3,634	30.1	+12.2
Federal Labor	Allan Howie	460	3.8	+3.8
Communist	Evred Bostick	404	3.3	+0.4
Total formal votes		12,088	98.8	+0.5
Informal votes		142	1.2	−0.5
Turnout		12,230	97.3	+2.7
Labor (NSW) hold		Swing	N/A	

- Preferences were not distributed.

==== 1930 ====
1930 New South Wales state election: Bulli
Party	Candidate	Votes	%	±%
Labor	Andrew Lysaght	9,170	79.2	
Nationalist	Edward Holmes	2,077	17.9	
Communist	Evred Bostick	331	2.9	
Total formal votes		11,578	98.3	
Informal votes		201	1.7	
Turnout		11,779	94.6	
Labor win		(new seat)		

Andrew Lysaght (Labor) was the sitting member for Illawarra.
