= Electoral results for the district of Heathcote =

Election results for Heathcote, New South Wales, Australia

Heathcote, an electoral district of the Legislative Assembly in the Australian state of New South Wales, has had two incarnations, the first from 1971 to 1991, the second from 1999 to the present.

== Members for Heathcote ==
First incarnation (1971–1991)
Election	Member	Party
1971	Rex Jackson	Labor
1973	Rex Jackson	Labor
1976	Rex Jackson	Labor
1978	Rex Jackson	Labor
1981	Rex Jackson	Labor
1984	Rex Jackson	Labor
1987 by	Ian McManus	Labor
1988	Allan Andrews	Liberal
Second incarnation (1999–present)
Election	Member	Party
1999	Ian McManus	Labor
2003	Paul McLeay	Labor
2007	Paul McLeay	Labor
2011	Lee Evans	Liberal
2015	Lee Evans	Liberal
2019	Lee Evans	Liberal
2023	Maryanne Stuart	Labor

== Election results ==
=== 2023 ===
2023 New South Wales state election: Heathcote
Party	Candidate	Votes	%	±%
Labor	Maryanne Stuart	23,301	44.2	+6.2
Liberal	Lee Evans	18,122	34.4	−8.0
Greens	Cooper Riach	6,571	12.5	−0.2
Shooters, Fishers, Farmers	Sean Ambrose (disendorsed)	1,926	3.7	+0.6
Animal Justice	Arielle Perkett	1,434	2.7	−0.2
Sustainable Australia	Matthew Bragg	1,369	2.6	+1.8
Total formal votes		52,723	97.6	+0.2
Informal votes		1,317	2.4	−0.2
Turnout		54,040	92.5	−0.1
Two-party-preferred result
Labor	Maryanne Stuart	29,050	59.9	+8.3
Liberal	Lee Evans	19,408	40.1	−8.3
Labor notional hold		Swing	+8.3	

=== Elections in the 2010s ===
==== 2019 ====
2019 New South Wales state election: Heathcote
Party	Candidate	Votes	%	±%
Liberal	Lee Evans	25,057	48.81	−1.16
Labor	Maryanne Stuart	17,842	34.76	+2.05
Greens	Mitchell Shakespeare	4,604	8.97	−0.28
Shooters, Fishers, Farmers	Joel McManus	1,959	3.82	+3.82
Animal Justice	James Aspey	1,872	3.65	+3.65
Total formal votes		51,334	97.30	+0.43
Informal votes		1,424	2.70	−0.43
Turnout		52,758	93.95	−0.30
Two-party-preferred result
Liberal	Lee Evans	26,174	54.96	−2.63
Labor	Maryanne Stuart	21,450	45.04	+2.63
Liberal hold		Swing	−2.63	

==== 2015 ====
2015 New South Wales state election: Heathcote
Party	Candidate	Votes	%	±%
Liberal	Lee Evans	25,554	50.0	−4.6
Labor	Maryanne Stuart	16,724	32.7	+11.5
Greens	Natasha Watson	4,729	9.2	−1.9
Independent	Greg Petty	1,893	3.7	−2.4
Christian Democrats	Ula Falanga	1,518	3.0	−1.3
No Land Tax	Ahmed Elawaad	717	1.4	+1.4
Total formal votes		51,135	96.9	+0.3
Informal votes		1,654	3.1	−0.3
Turnout		52,789	94.2	−0.6
Two-party-preferred result
Liberal	Lee Evans	26,989	57.6	−11.4
Labor	Maryanne Stuart	19,873	42.4	+11.4
Liberal hold		Swing	−11.4	

==== 2011 ====
2011 New South Wales state election: Heathcote
Party	Candidate	Votes	%	±%
Liberal	Lee Evans	20,700	47.0	+14.8
Labor	Paul McLeay	10,074	22.9	−20.3
Greens	Phil Smith	6,972	15.8	+1.3
Hatton's Independent Team	Greg Petty	3,471	7.9	+7.9
Christian Democrats	Chris Atlee	1,631	3.7	−2.0
Independent	Peter Bussa	1,225	2.8	+2.8
Total formal votes		44,073	96.9	−0.9
Informal votes		1,419	3.1	+0.9
Turnout		45,492	94.2	+0.2
Two-party-preferred result
Liberal	Lee Evans	22,939	62.9	+21.7
Labor	Paul McLeay	13,512	37.1	−21.7
Liberal gain from Labor		Swing	+21.7	

=== Elections in the 2000s ===
==== 2007 ====
2007 New South Wales state election: Heathcote
Party	Candidate	Votes	%	±%
Labor	Paul McLeay	18,377	43.2	−4.2
Liberal	Lee Evans	13,712	32.2	+2.5
Greens	Jill Merrin	6,171	14.5	+0.8
Christian Democrats	John Vanderjagt	2,442	5.7	+1.9
AAFI	Mary Kelly	1,865	4.4	+2.2
Total formal votes		42,567	97.8	+0.1
Informal votes		948	2.2	−0.1
Turnout		43,515	94.0	
Two-party-preferred result
Labor	Paul McLeay	22,427	58.8	−3.5
Liberal	Lee Evans	15,745	41.2	+3.5
Labor hold		Swing	−3.5	

==== 2003 ====
2003 New South Wales state election: Heathcote
Party	Candidate	Votes	%	±%
Labor	Paul McLeay	19,502	46.8	−0.1
Liberal	Peter Vermeer	13,957	33.5	+3.3
Greens	Tanya Leishman	4,109	9.9	+4.3
Christian Democrats	Jim Bowen	1,688	4.1	+0.8
One Nation	Peter McCallum	1,059	2.5	−5.8
AAFI	Michael Toohey	949	2.3	+1.1
Horse Riders	Christopher Camp	368	0.9	+0.9
Total formal votes		41,632	97.8	−0.3
Informal votes		925	2.2	+0.3
Turnout		42,557	93.9	
Two-party-preferred result
Labor	Paul McLeay	22,209	58.7	−1.7
Liberal	Peter Vermeer	15,598	41.3	+1.7
Labor hold		Swing	−1.7	

=== Elections in the 1990s ===
==== 1999 ====
1999 New South Wales state election: Heathcote
Party	Candidate	Votes	%	±%
Labor	Ian McManus	19,274	46.9	+3.4
Liberal	Lorna Stone	12,401	30.2	−11.3
One Nation	Reg Lowder	3,400	8.3	+8.3
Greens	Jo-Anne Lentern	2,300	5.6	−0.6
Democrats	David Holloway	1,379	3.4	+3.2
Christian Democrats	Jim Bowen	1,351	3.3	−1.5
AAFI	Zero Hughes	506	1.2	+1.1
Outdoor Recreation	Brett McLoughlin	382	0.9	+0.9
Unity	Wai Tsui	127	0.3	+0.3
Total formal votes		41,120	98.1	+1.9
Informal votes		784	1.9	−1.9
Turnout		41,904	95.0	
Two-party-preferred result
Labor	Ian McManus	21,864	60.4	+8.0
Liberal	Lorna Stone	14,336	39.6	−8.0
Labor notional hold		Swing	+8.0	

==== 1991 & 1995 ====
District abolished

=== Elections in the 1980s ===
==== 1988 ====
1988 New South Wales state election: Heathcote
Party	Candidate	Votes	%	±%
Liberal	Allan Andrews	14,863	47.0	+6.0
Labor	Peter Presdee	12,434	39.3	−11.9
Independent	Jack Pendlebury	2,558	8.1	+8.1
Democrats	Arthur Snow	1,783	5.6	−2.3
Total formal votes		31,638	97.5	−0.5
Informal votes		804	2.5	+0.5
Turnout		32,442	96.2	
Two-party-preferred result
Liberal	Allan Andrews	15,844	51.8	+6.9
Labor	Peter Presdee	14,718	48.2	−6.9
Liberal gain from Labor		Swing	+6.9	

==== 1987 by-election ====
1987 Heathcote state by-election
Party	Candidate	Votes	%	±%
Labor	Ian McManus	10,870	37.4	−18.2
Liberal	Allan Andrews	9,173	31.6	−2.2
Independent	Rex Jackson	1,862	6.4	+6.4
Independent	Brian Tobin	1,780	6.1	+6.1
Community Conservation Team	Jim Powell	1,490	5.1	+5.1
Call to Australia	Kevin O'Connor	1,168	4.0	+4.0
Democrats	Murray Scott	1,076	3.7	−7.0
Marijuana	Nicholas Brash	675	2.3	+2.3
Socialist Workers	Robynne Murphy	276	1.0	+1.0
Independent	Cheryl Hill	179	0.6	+0.6
Centre Unity	Colin Poulos	179	0.6	+0.6
Unite Australia	Alan Smith	168	0.6	+0.6
Independent	Noel Carr	141	0.5	+0.5
Illawarra Workers	Cecil Lloyd	18	0.1	+0.1
Independent	Kusala Fitzroy-Mendis	11	0.0	+0.0
Independent	Stanley Fitzroy-Mendis	9	0.0	+0.0
Total formal votes		29,075	98.0	
Informal votes		602	2.0	
Turnout		29,677	88.8	
Two-party-preferred result
Labor	Ian McManus	13,517	52.8	−8.3
Liberal	Allan Andrews	12,077	47.2	+8.3
Labor hold		Swing	−8.3	

Labor party member Rex Jackson resigned.

==== 1984 ====
1984 New South Wales state election: Heathcote
Party	Candidate	Votes	%	±%
Labor	Rex Jackson	16,582	55.6	−11.7
Liberal	Gordon Davies	10,052	33.7	+10.0
Democrats	Fran Johnson	3,179	10.7	+6.4
Total formal votes		29,813	97.7	+0.2
Informal votes		711	2.3	−0.2
Turnout		30,524	94.6	+1.2
Two-party-preferred result
Labor	Rex Jackson		61.1	−12.0
Liberal	Gordon Davies		38.9	+12.0
Labor hold		Swing	−12.0	

==== 1981 ====
1981 New South Wales state election: Heathcote
Party	Candidate	Votes	%	±%
Labor	Rex Jackson	18,771	67.3	−5.1
Liberal	Ron Phillips	6,609	23.7	+1.7
Independent	Maree Jamieson	1,310	4.7	+4.7
Democrats	Warren Evans	1,202	4.3	−1.3
Total formal votes		27,892	97.5	
Informal votes		714	2.5	
Turnout		28,606	93.4	
Two-party-preferred result
Labor	Rex Jackson	19,271	73.1	−2.1
Liberal	Ron Phillips	7,109	26.9	+2.1
Labor hold		Swing	−2.1	

=== Elections in the 1970s ===
==== 1978 ====
1978 New South Wales state election: Heathcote
Party	Candidate	Votes	%	±%
Labor	Rex Jackson	22,707	72.4	+9.2
Liberal	Ron Phillips	6,906	22.0	−14.8
Democrats	James Dredge	1,760	5.6	+5.6
Total formal votes		31,373	98.4	0.0
Informal votes		523	1.6	0.0
Turnout		31,896	94.5	−0.3
Two-party-preferred result
Labor	Rex Jackson	23,567	75.2	+12.0
Liberal	Ron Phillips	7,780	24.8	−12.0
Labor hold		Swing	+12.0	

==== 1976 ====
1976 New South Wales state election: Heathcote
Party	Candidate	Votes	%	±%
Labor	Rex Jackson	19,228	63.2	+4.7
Liberal	Ron Phillips	11,201	36.8	+8.2
Total formal votes		30,429	98.4	+0.5
Informal votes		501	1.6	−0.5
Turnout		30,930	94.8	+0.8
Labor hold		Swing	−2.3	

==== 1973 ====
1973 New South Wales state election: Heathcote
Party	Candidate	Votes	%	±%
Labor	Rex Jackson	16,490	58.5	0.0
Liberal	Philip Benwell	8,069	28.6	−5.0
Independent	Norman Tonkin	2,743	9.7	+9.7
Democratic Labor	Margaret Silva	887	3.2	+3.2
Total formal votes		28,189	97.9	
Informal votes		617	2.1	
Turnout		28,806	94.0	
Two-party-preferred result
Labor	Rex Jackson	18,464	65.5	−1.7
Liberal	Philip Benwell	9,725	34.5	+1.7
Labor hold		Swing	−1.7	

==== 1971 ====
1971 New South Wales state election: Heathcote
Party	Candidate	Votes	%	±%
Labor	Rex Jackson	16,426	58.5	
Liberal	Evelyn Thompson	9,433	33.6	
Defence of Government Schools	Edna McGill	2,233	7.9	
Total formal votes		28,092	98.3	
Informal votes		480	1.7	
Turnout		28,572	95.5	
Two-party-preferred result
Labor	Rex Jackson	17,766	63.2	+6.2
Liberal	Evelyn Thompson	10,326	36.8	−6.2
Labor notional hold		Swing	+6.2	
