= 1955 Bulli state by-election =

Election result for Bulli, New South Wales, Australia

A by-election was held for the New South Wales Legislative Assembly electorate of Bulli on 9 July 1955 because of the death of Laurie Kelly (Labor).

== Dates ==
Date	Event
5 May 1955	Laurie Kelly died.
14 June 1955	Writ of election issued by the Speaker of the Legislative Assembly.
22 June 1955	Day of nomination
9 July 1955	Polling day
5 August 1955	Return of writ

== Result ==
1955 Bulli by-election Saturday 9 July
Party	Candidate	Votes	%	±%
Labor	Rex Jackson	8,726	51.1	−36.8
Liberal	Lewis Jaratt	3,811	22.3	
Independent Labor	Leslie Strachan	3,359	19.7	
Communist	Leonard Boardman	1,187	7.0	−5.2
Total formal votes		17,083	98.4	
Informal votes		276	1.6	
Turnout		17,359	85.5	
Labor hold		Swing	N/A	

Preferences were not distributed.

== See also ==
- Electoral results for the district of Bulli
- List of New South Wales state by-elections
