= 1987 Heathcote state by-election =

Election result for Heathcote, New South Wales, Australia

A by-election was held for the New South Wales Legislative Assembly electorate of Heathcote on 31 January 1987 following the resignation of sitting Labor party member Rex Jackson amidst a corruption scandal that ultimately led to his imprisonment. Jackson was facing conspiracy charges arising from his role as Minister for Corrective Services and Jackson resigned so that he could use his superannuation payout to meet his legal costs, where the government has ceased paying those costs in March 1985. Jackson said "The Government's put me in a position where I've got no choice. What the Labor Party has done to me is absolutely outrageous". The Labor government delayed the by-election as long as possible, arguing that it was not possible to hold an election during Jackson's trial or while Parliament was sitting. The Leader of the Opposition, Nick Greiner, rejected this argument, declaring that the election was only delayed in an attempt to allow any bad press from the corruption trial to die down. The election finally came on 31 January 1987, and was rarely short of drama: Jackson, with criminal charges hanging over his head, entered as a spoiler candidate; the Liberals found themselves in hot water over an illegally large billboard prominently placed on the electorate's border over the Princes Highway; and the ALP were accused of sabotage after vandals cut loose from its moorings a Liberal advertising blimp.

The Heathcote by-election was held the same day as the Bankstown by-election.

== Dates ==
Date	Event
27 October 1983	Rex Jackson resigned as Minister for Corrective Services and Minister for Roads.
March 1985	NSW Government ceased paying Jackson's legal bills.
13 August 1986	Rex Jackson resigned from parliament.
2 January 1987	Writ of election issued by the Speaker of the Legislative Assembly and close of electoral rolls.
8 January 1987	Nominations
31 January 1987	Polling day
20 February 1987	Return of writ

== Results ==
1987 Heathcote state by-election
Party	Candidate	Votes	%	±%
Labor	Ian McManus	10,870	37.4	−18.2
Liberal	Allan Andrews	9,173	31.6	−2.2
Independent	Rex Jackson	1,862	6.4	+6.4
Independent	Brian Tobin	1,780	6.1	+6.1
Community Conservation Team	Jim Powell	1,490	5.1	+5.1
Call to Australia	Kevin O'Connor	1,168	4.0	+4.0
Democrats	Murray Scott	1,076	3.7	−7.0
Marijuana	Nicholas Brash	675	2.3	+2.3
Socialist Workers	Robynne Murphy	276	1.0	+1.0
Independent	Cheryl Hill	179	0.6	+0.6
Centre Unity	Colin Poulos	179	0.6	+0.6
Unite Australia	Alan Smith	168	0.6	+0.6
Independent	Noel Carr	141	0.5	+0.5
Illawarra Workers	Cecil Lloyd	18	0.1	+0.1
Independent	Kusala Fitzroy-Mendis	11	0.0	+0.0
Independent	Stanley Fitzroy-Mendis	9	0.0	+0.0
Total formal votes		29,075	98.0	
Informal votes		602	2.0	
Turnout		29,677	88.8	
Two-party-preferred result
Labor	Ian McManus	13,517	52.8	−8.3
Liberal	Allan Andrews	12,077	47.2	+8.3
Labor hold		Swing	−8.3	

== See also ==
- Electoral results for the district of Heathcote
- List of New South Wales state by-elections
