= Lang ministry (1930–1932) =

- 45th Cabinet of the State of New South Wales

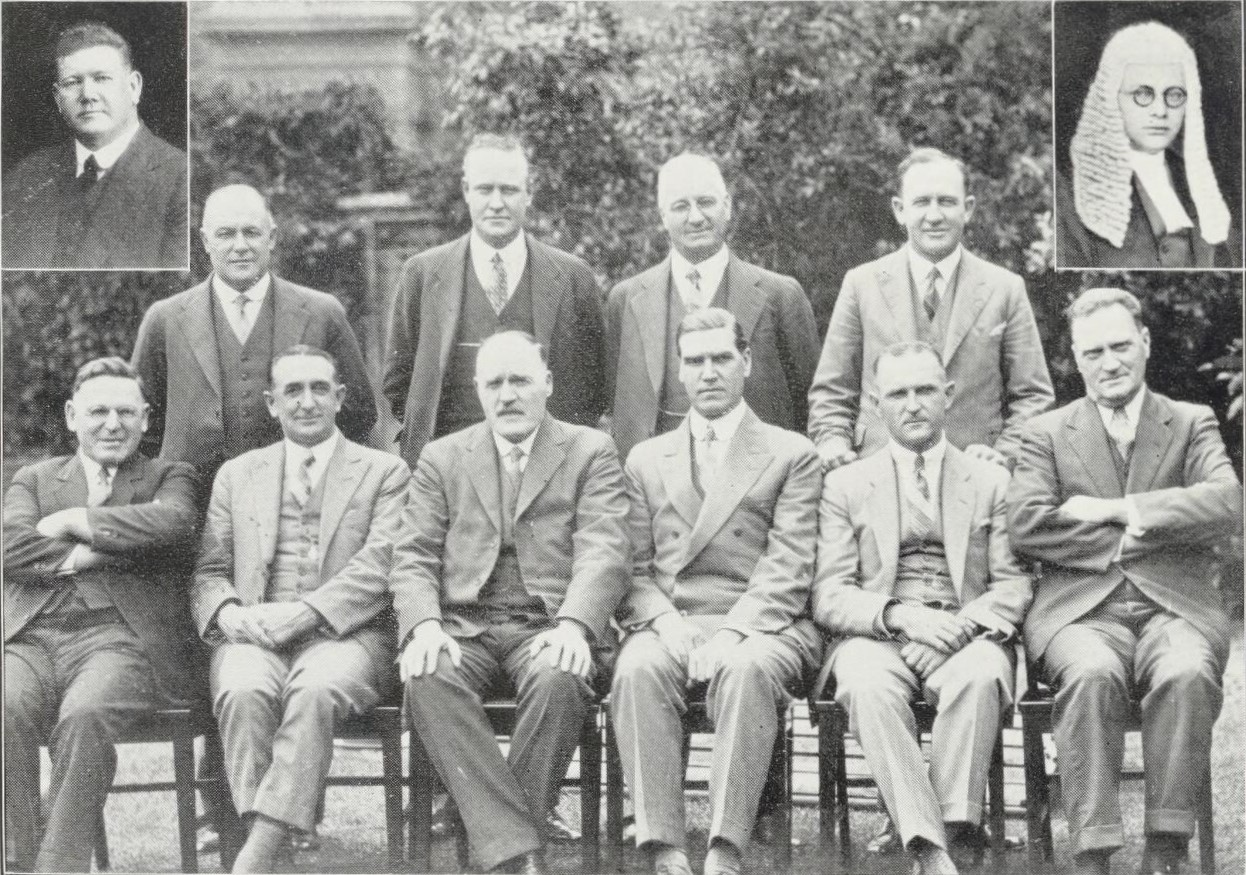
- Group portrait of the final composition of the ministry from 17 June 1931 to 13 May 1932.
- Date formed: 4 November 1930
- Date dissolved: 13 May 1932

People and organisations
- Monarch: George V
- Governor: Sir Philip Game
- Head of government: Jack Lang
- No. of ministers: 16
- Member party: Labor
- Status in legislature: Majority government
- Opposition party: Nationalist
- Opposition leader: Thomas Bavin

History
- Outgoing election: 1925 New South Wales election
- Predecessor: Bavin ministry
- Successor: First Stevens ministry

The Lang ministry (1930–1932) or Third Lang ministry was the 45th ministry of the New South Wales Government, and was led by the 23rd Premier, Jack Lang. This ministry was the third and final time of three occasions where Lang was Premier.

Lang was first elected to the New South Wales Legislative Assembly in 1913 and served continuously until 1946. In 1923 Lang was elected NSW Parliamentary Leader of the Labor Party by Labor caucus, and became Leader of the Opposition. At the 1925 state election, Lang led Labor to victory, defeating the Nationalist Party led by Sir George Fuller.

Lang's initial ministry was confronted with extended cabinet strife, centred on Albert Willis. Lang gained the approval of the Governor to reconstruct the ministry, his second as Lang Labor, subject to an early election, held in October 1927. Defeated by a Nationalist–Country Coalition led by Thomas Bavin and Ernest Buttenshaw at the 1927 election, Lang again won government at the 1930 election, in the middle of the Great Depression.

This ministry covers the period from 4 November 1930 until 13 May 1932 when the Governor of New South Wales, Sir Philip Game used the reserve power of The Crown to remove Lang as Premier (see Lang Dismissal Crisis), and appointed Bertram Stevens as Premier.

== Composition of ministry ==
The composition of the ministry was announced by Premier Lang on 4 November 1930 and covers the period up to 13 May 1932.

Portfolio	Minister	Party	Term commence	Term end	Term of office
Premier; Treasurer	Jack Lang	Lang Labor	4 November 1930	13 May 1932	1 year, 191 days
Secretary for Mines; Minister for Labour and Industry	Jack Baddeley	Lang Labor	4 November 1930	13 May 1932	1 year, 191 days
Chief Secretary	Mark Gosling	Lang Labor	4 November 1930	13 May 1932	1 year, 191 days
Attorney General	Andrew Lysaght (Note: Resigned office.)	Lang Labor	4 November 1930	16 June 1931	224 days
Attorney General	Joseph Lamaro	Lang Labor	17 June 1931	13 May 1932	331 days
Minister of Justice	Joseph Lamaro	Lang Labor	4 November 1930	17 June 1931	225 days
Minister of Justice	William McKell	Lang Labor	17 June 1931	13 May 1932	331 days
Minister for Local Government	William McKell	Lang Labor	4 November 1930	17 June 1931	225 days
Minister for Local Government	James McGirr	Lang Labor	17 June 1931	13 May 1932	331 days
Minister for Transport	James McGirr	Lang Labor	22 March 1932	13 May 1932	52 days
Minister for Health	James McGirr	Lang Labor	4 November 1930	17 June 1931	225 days
Minister for Health	Bill Ely	Lang Labor	17 June 1931	13 May 1932	331 days
Assistant Minister for Labour and Industry	Bill Ely	Lang Labor	4 November 1930	17 June 1931	225 days
Minister of Public Instruction	Billy Davies	Lang Labor	4 November 1930	13 May 1932	1 year, 191 days
Secretary for Lands	Jack Tully	Lang Labor	4 November 1930	13 May 1932	1 year, 191 days
Minister for Agriculture; Minister for Forests	Bill Dunn	Lang Labor	4 November 1930	13 May 1932	1 year, 191 days
Secretary for Public Works	Mat Davidson	Lang Labor	4 November 1930	13 May 1932	1 year, 191 days
Vice-president of the Executive Council; Representative of the Government in Legislative Council	Albert Willis, MLC	Lang Labor	4 November 1930	2 April 1931	149 days
Vice-president of the Executive Council; Representative of the Government in Legislative Council	James Concannon, MLC	Lang Labor	3 April 1931	13 May 1932	1 year, 40 days
Honorary Minister	James Concannon, MLC	Lang Labor	4 November 1930	2 April 1931	149 days

Ministers are members of the Legislative Assembly unless otherwise noted.

== See also ==
- First Lang ministry
- Second Lang ministry
- Members of the New South Wales Legislative Assembly, 1930-1932
- Members of the New South Wales Legislative Council, 1930-1932

Preceded by Bavin ministry	Lang ministry (1930–1932); 1930–1932	Succeeded by Stevens-Bruxner ministry (1932–1935)
