= Lang ministry (1927) =

Former government of New South Wales

- 43rd Cabinet of the State of New South Wales

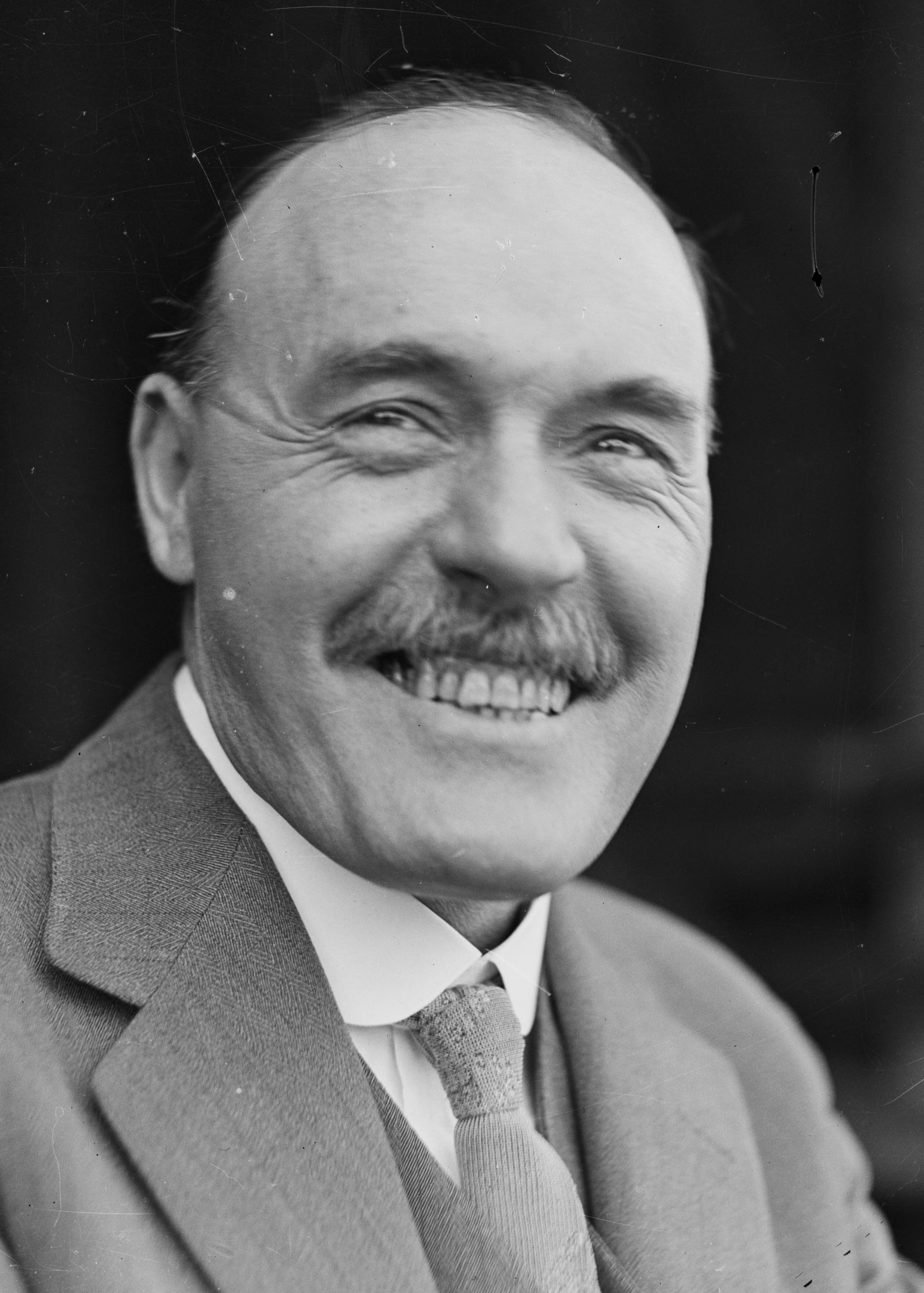
- Premier Jack Lang
- Date formed: 27 May 1927
- Date dissolved: 18 October 1927

People and organisations
- Monarch: George V
- Governor: Sir Dudley de Chair
- Head of government: Jack Lang
- No. of ministers: 16
- Member party: Labor
- Status in legislature: Majority government
- Opposition party: Nationalist
- Opposition leader: Thomas Bavin

History
- Outgoing election: 1925 New South Wales election
- Predecessor: Lang ministry (1925–1927)
- Successor: Bavin ministry

The Lang ministry (1927) or Second Lang ministry or Lang Reconstruction ministry was the 43rd ministry of the New South Wales Government, and was led by the 23rd Premier, Jack Lang. This ministry was the second of three ministries where Lang was Premier.

Lang was first elected to the New South Wales Legislative Assembly in 1913 and served continuously until 1946. In 1923 Lang was elected NSW Parliamentary Leader of the Labor Party by Labor caucus, and became Opposition Leader. At the 1925 state election, Lang led Labor to victory, defeating the Nationalist Party led by Sir George Fuller.

Lang's initial ministry was confronted with extended cabinet strife, centred on Albert Willis. Lang resigned his commission on 26 May 1927. As there was no viable alternative government, Governor Sir Dudley de Chair recommissioned Lang to form a caretaker government on the condition that he would recommend a dissolution of the Legislative Assembly and call an early election, which was held in October 1927.

This reconstructed ministry covers the Lang Labor period from 27 May 1927 until 18 October 1927 when Lang was defeated by a Nationalist–Country Coalition led by Thomas Bavin and Ernest Buttenshaw.

== Composition of ministry ==
The composition of the ministry was announced by Premier Lang on 27 May 1927 and covers the period up to 18 October 1927.

Portfolio	Minister	Party	Term commence	Term end	Term of office
Premier; Treasurer	Jack Lang (Note: continued with these roles from the first Lang ministry.)	Lang Labor	27 May 1927	18 October 1927	144 days
Chief Secretary	Mark Gosling	Lang Labor	27 May 1927	18 October 1927	144 days
Attorney General	Andrew Lysaght	Lang Labor	27 May 1927	18 October 1927	144 days
Minister of Justice	Andrew Lysaght	Lang Labor	8 June 1927	18 October 1927	132 days
Minister of Justice	William McKell	Lang Labor	27 May 1927	7 June 1927	11 days
Assistant Treasurer	William McKell	Lang Labor	27 May 1927	7 June 1927	11 days
Assistant Treasurer	Robert Cruickshank, MLC	Lang Labor	19 September 1927	18 October 1927	29 days
Minister without portfolio	Robert Cruickshank, MLC	Lang Labor	27 May 1927	18 September 1927	114 days
Minister of Public Instruction	Billy Davies	Lang Labor	27 May 1927	18 October 1927	144 days
Secretary for Public Works; Minister for Railways	Bill Ratcliffe	Lang Labor	27 May 1927	18 October 1927	144 days
Secretary for Lands; Minister for Forests	Edward Horsington	Lang Labor	27 May 1927	18 October 1927	144 days
Minister for Agriculture	Paddy Stokes	Lang Labor	27 May 1927	18 October 1927	144 days
Minister for Local Government	Tom Keegan	Lang Labor	27 May 1927	18 October 1927	144 days
Minister for Public Health	Robert Stuart-Robertson	Lang Labor	27 May 1927	18 October 1927	144 days
Vice-president of the Executive Council; Representative of the Government in Legislative Council	Albert Willis, MLC	Lang Labor	27 May 1927	18 October 1927	144 days
Secretary for Mines; Minister for Labour and Industry	Jack Baddeley	Lang Labor	27 May 1927	18 October 1927	144 days

Ministers are members of the Legislative Assembly unless otherwise noted.

== See also ==
- First Lang ministry
- Third Lang ministry
- Members of the New South Wales Legislative Assembly, 1925-1927

Preceded by Lang ministry (1925–1927)	Lang ministry 1927	Succeeded by Bavin ministry
