= 1933 Bulli state by-election =

- 3 June 1933

Electoral district of Bulli in the New South Wales Legislative Assembly
- Registered: 13,008
- Turnout: 92.0% (▼5.3)
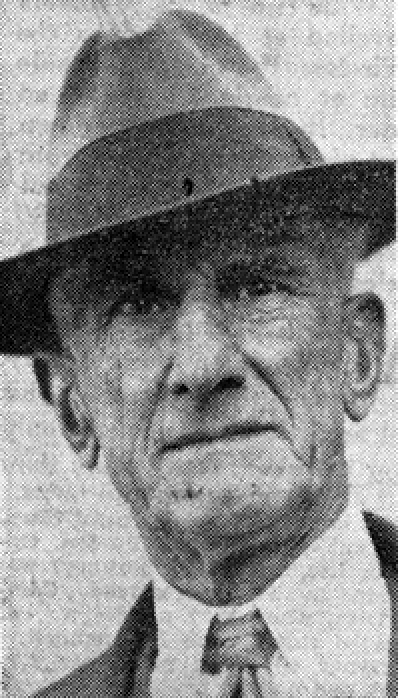

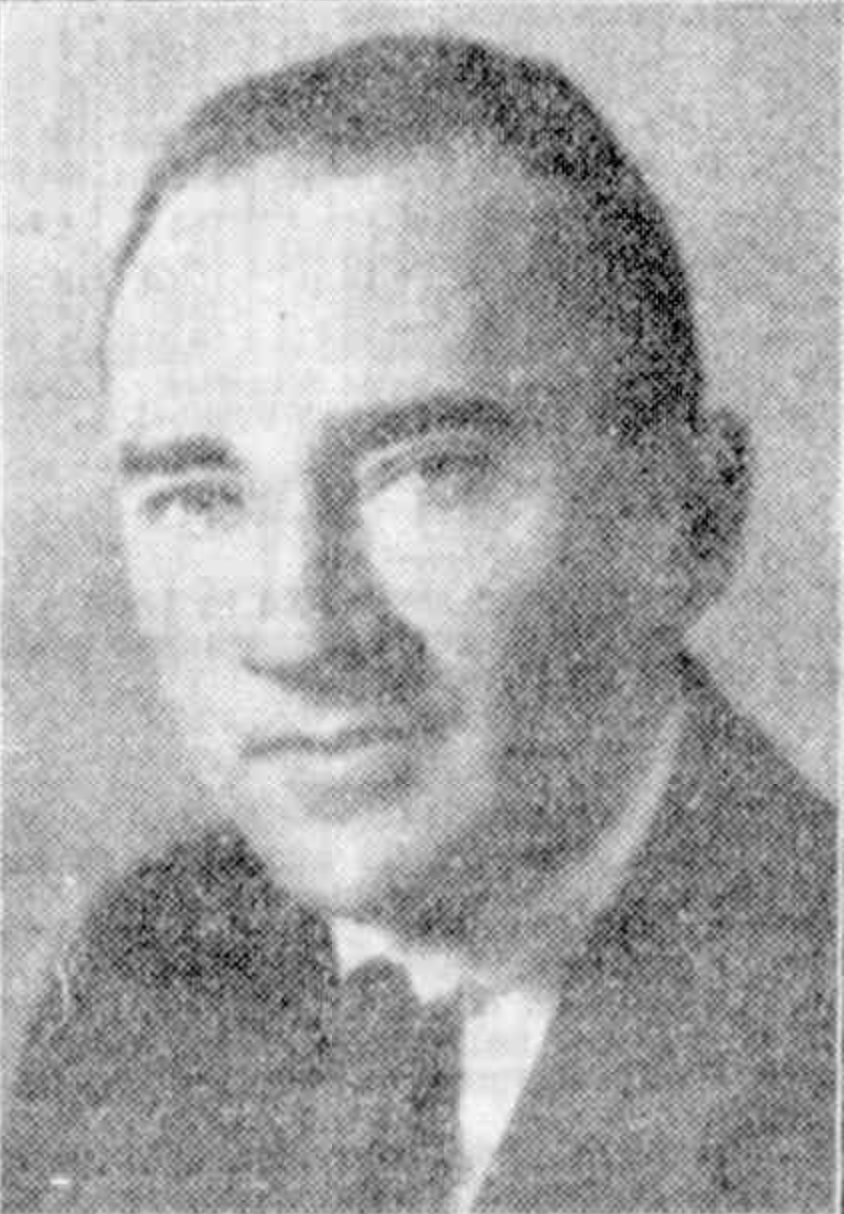

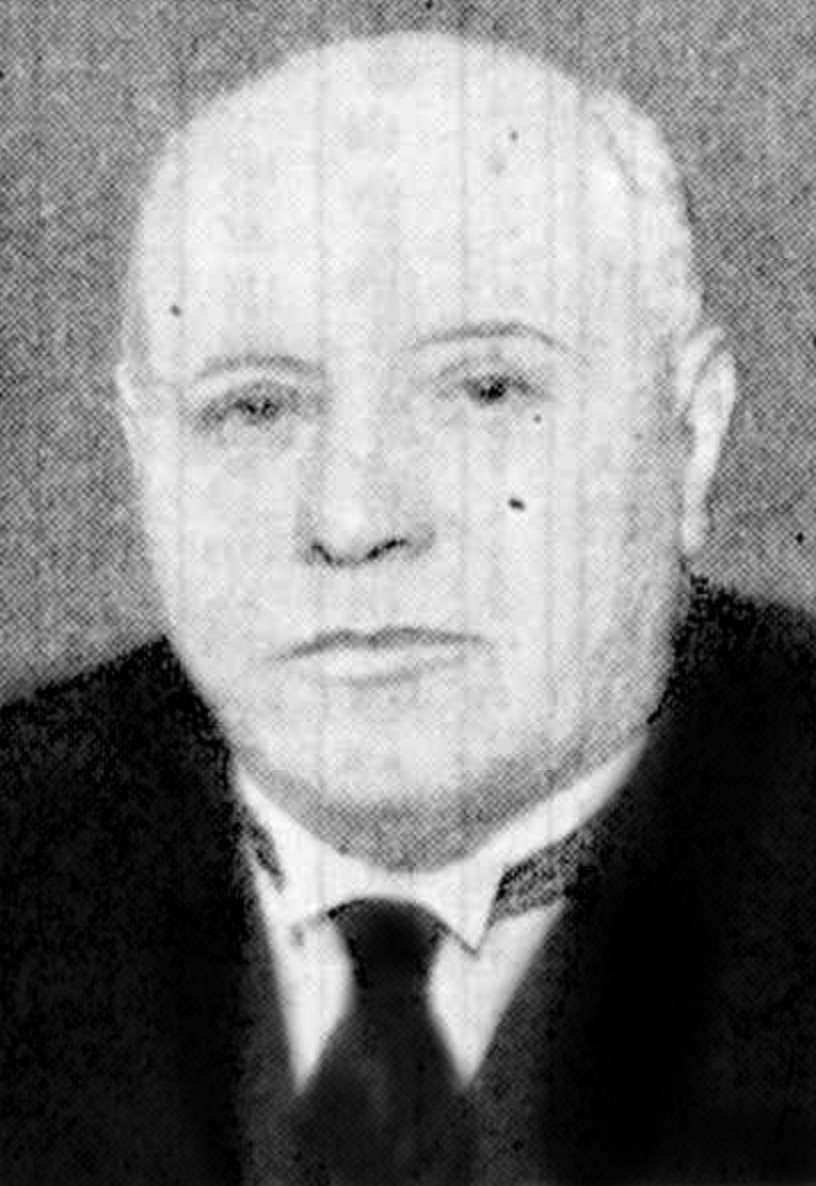
	First party	Second party	Third party
Candidate	John Sweeney	Arthur Butterell	Albert Willis
Party	Labor	United Australia	Miners
Primary vote	5,376	3,084	2,783
Percentage	45.5%	26.1%	23.5%
Swing	▼17.3	▼4.0	▲23.5
TPP	65.4%	34.6%
TPP swing	▲65.4	▲34.6
MP before election
Andrew Lysaght
Labor
Elected MP
John Sweeney
Labor

The 1933 Bulli state by-election was held on 3 June 1933 to elect the member for Bulli in the New South Wales Legislative Assembly, following the death of Labor MP Andrew Lysaght.

John Sweeney retained the seat for the Jack Lang-led Labor Party despite a negative swing of 17.3% from the 1932 state election. Much of the party's vote went to Albert Willis, who contested the by-election as a "Miners' Candidate" after being expelled from Labor for standing against an endorsed candidate.

== Key events ==
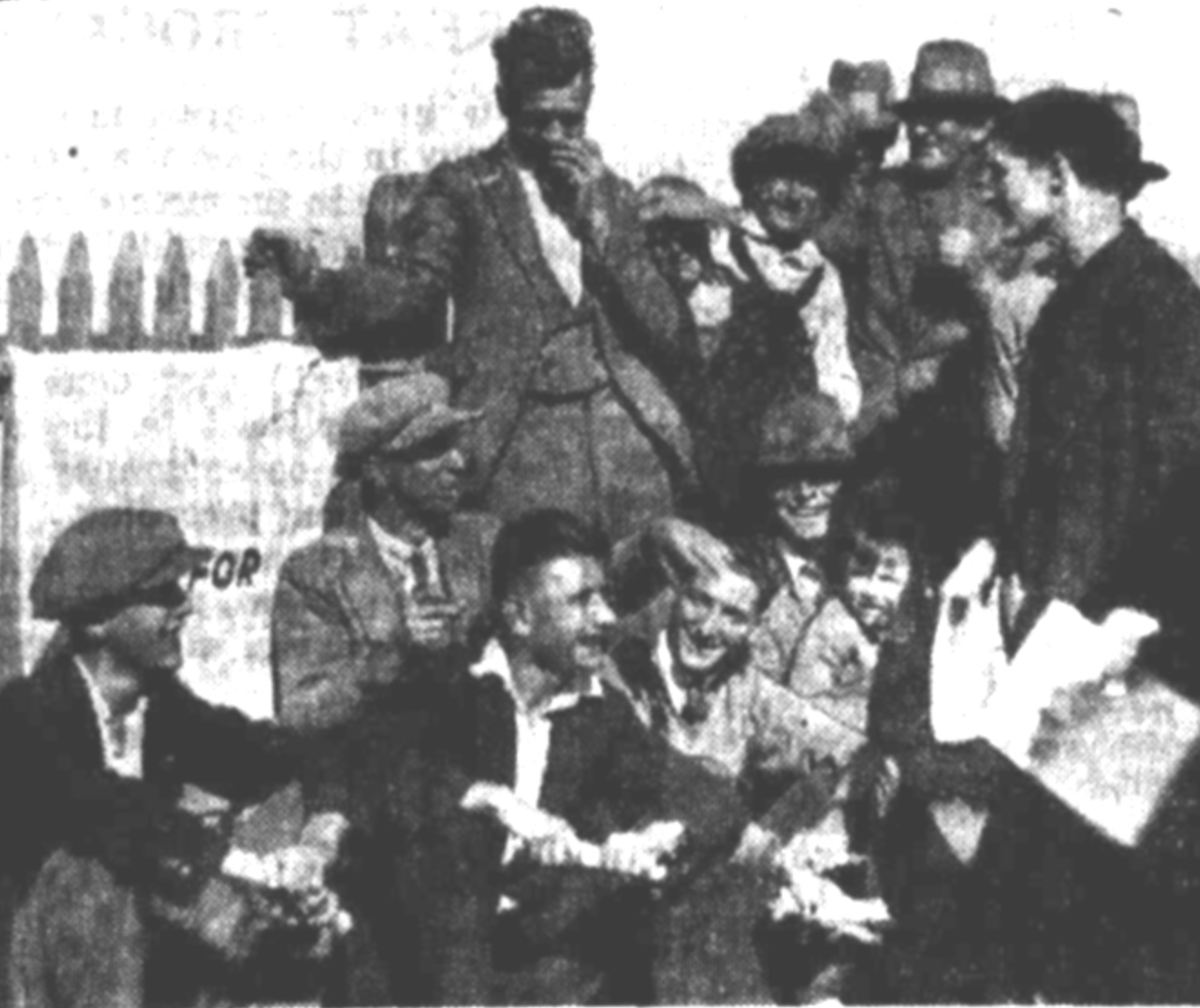
A UAP supporter handing out how-to-vote cards to young coal miners at a polling booth in Coledale

- 3 May 1933 − Andrew Lysaght dies
- 7 May 1933 − Writ of election issued by the Speaker of the Legislative Assembly
- 22 May 1933 − Candidate nominations
- 3 June 1933 − Polling day
- 9 June 1933 − Results declared
- 14 June 1933 − Return of writ

== Candidates ==
Party	Candidate	Background
United Australia	Arthur Butterell	Accountant and candidate for West Sydney at the 1931 federal election
Communist	Paul Martin	Labourer who said he was "sure to finish fourth"
Labor	John Sweeney	Former secretary of the Southern District Miners' Federation
Miners	Albert Willis	Former Agent-General and Legislative Council member

Additionally, the Federal Labor Party was expected to contest the by-election after receiving 3.8% of the vote in 1932, but this did not eventuate.

== Results ==
1933 Bulli state by-election
Party	Candidate	Votes	%	±%
Labor	John Sweeney	5,376	45.5	−17.3
United Australia	Arthur Butterell	3,084	26.1	−4.0
Miners	Albert Willis	2,783	23.5	+23.5
Communist	Paul Martin	586	5.0	+1.7
Total formal votes		11,829	98.9	+0.1
Informal votes		136	1.1	−0.1
Turnout		11,965	92.0	−5.3
Two-party-preferred result
Labor	John Sweeney	7,734	65.4	+65.4
United Australia	Arthur Butterell	4,095	34.6	+34.6
Labor hold		Swing	N/A	

== See also ==
- Electoral results for the district of Bulli
- List of New South Wales state by-elections
