= Lang ministry (1925–1927) =

42nd ministry of NSW, Australia

- 42nd Cabinet of the State of New South Wales

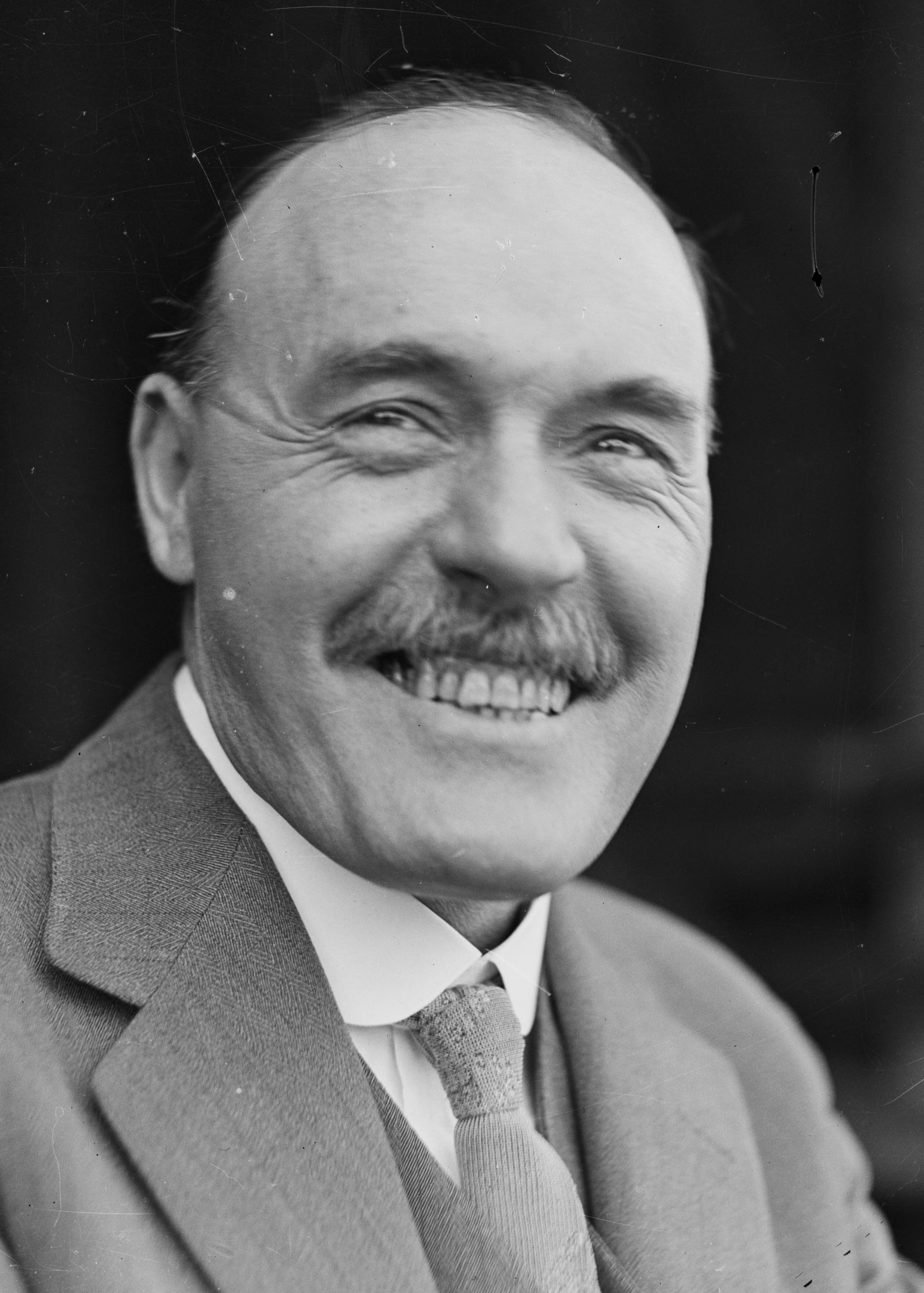
- Premier Jack Lang
- Date formed: 17 June 1925
- Date dissolved: 26 May 1927

People and organisations
- Monarch: George V
- Governor: Sir Dudley de Chair
- Head of government: Jack Lang
- No. of ministers: 16
- Member party: Labor
- Status in legislature: Majority government
- Opposition party: Nationalist
- Opposition leader: Thomas Bavin

History
- Election: 1925 New South Wales election
- Predecessor: Second Fuller ministry
- Successor: Lang ministry (1927)

The Lang ministry (1925–1927) or First Lang ministry was the 42nd ministry of the New South Wales Government, and was led by the 23rd Premier, Jack Lang. This ministry was the first of three ministries under Lang as Premier.

Lang was first elected to the New South Wales Legislative Assembly in 1913 and served continuously until 1946. In 1923 Lang was elected NSW Parliamentary Leader of the Labor Party by the Labor caucus, and became Opposition Leader in 1923. At the 1925 state election, Lang led Labor to victory, defeating the Nationalist Party led by Sir George Fuller.

The ministry covers the period from 17 June 1925 until 26 May 1927 when Lang was confronted with extended cabinet strife, centred on Albert Willis. Lang gained the approval of the Governor to reconstruct the ministry subject to an early election, held in October 1927.

== Composition of ministry ==
The composition of the ministry was announced by Premier Lang on 17 June 1925 and covers the period up to 26 May 1927.

Portfolio	Minister	Party	Term commence	Term end	Term of office
Premier; Treasurer	Jack Lang	Labor	17 June 1925	26 May 1927	1 year, 343 days
Secretary for Lands; Minister for Forests	Jack Lang	Labor	25 November 1926	26 May 1927	182 days
Secretary for Lands; Minister for Forests	Peter Loughlin (Note: Resigned office.)	Labor	17 June 1925	19 November 1926	1 year, 155 days
Secretary for Mines; Minister for Labour and Industry	Jack Baddeley (Note: Kept same roles in the second Lang ministry.)	Labor	17 June 1925	26 May 1927	1 year, 343 days
Attorney General	Edward McTiernan	Labor	17 June 1925	26 May 1927	1 year, 343 days
Minister for Agriculture	Bill Dunn	Labor	17 June 1925	26 May 1927	1 year, 343 days
Assistant Secretary for Lands; Assistant Minister for Forests	Bill Dunn	Labor	25 November 1926	26 May 1927	182 days
Minister of Justice; Assistant Treasurer	William McKell	Labor	17 June 1925	26 May 1927	1 year, 343 days
Minister for Education	Thomas Mutch	Labor	17 June 1925	26 May 1927	1 year, 343 days
Chief Secretary	Carlo Lazzarini	Labor	17 June 1925	26 May 1927	1 year, 343 days
Minister for Public Health	George Cann (Note: Resigned as Minister for Local Government only.)	Labor	17 June 1925	26 May 1927	1 year, 343 days
Minister for Local Government	George Cann	Labor	17 June 1925	24 March 1926	280 days
Minister for Local Government	Joseph Fitzgerald	Labor	25 March 1926	26 May 1927	1 year, 62 days
Assistant Minister for Local Government	Joseph Fitzgerald	Labor	17 June 1925	24 March 1926	280 days
Assistant Minister for Public Health	Joseph Fitzgerald	Labor	17 June 1925	24 March 1926	280 days
Secretary for Public Works; Minister for Railways	Martin Flannery	Labor	17 June 1925	26 May 1927	1 year, 343 days
Minister without portfolio	Joseph Coates, MLC	Labor	17 June 1925	26 May 1927	1 year, 343 days
Vice-president of the Executive Council; Representative of the Government in Legislative Council	Albert Willis, MLC	Labor	17 June 1925	26 May 1927	1 year, 343 days

Ministers are members of the Legislative Assembly unless otherwise noted.

== See also ==
- Second Lang ministry
- Third Lang ministry
- Members of the New South Wales Legislative Assembly, 1925-1927
- Members of the New South Wales Legislative Council, 1925-1927

Preceded by Fuller ministry (1922–1925)	Lang ministry 1925–1927	Succeeded by Lang ministry (1927)
