= 1988 New South Wales state election =

State election for New South Wales, Australia in March 1988

- 19 March 1988

All 109 seats in the New South Wales Legislative Assembly and 15 (of the 45) seats in the New South Wales Legislative Council 55 Assembly seats were needed for a majority
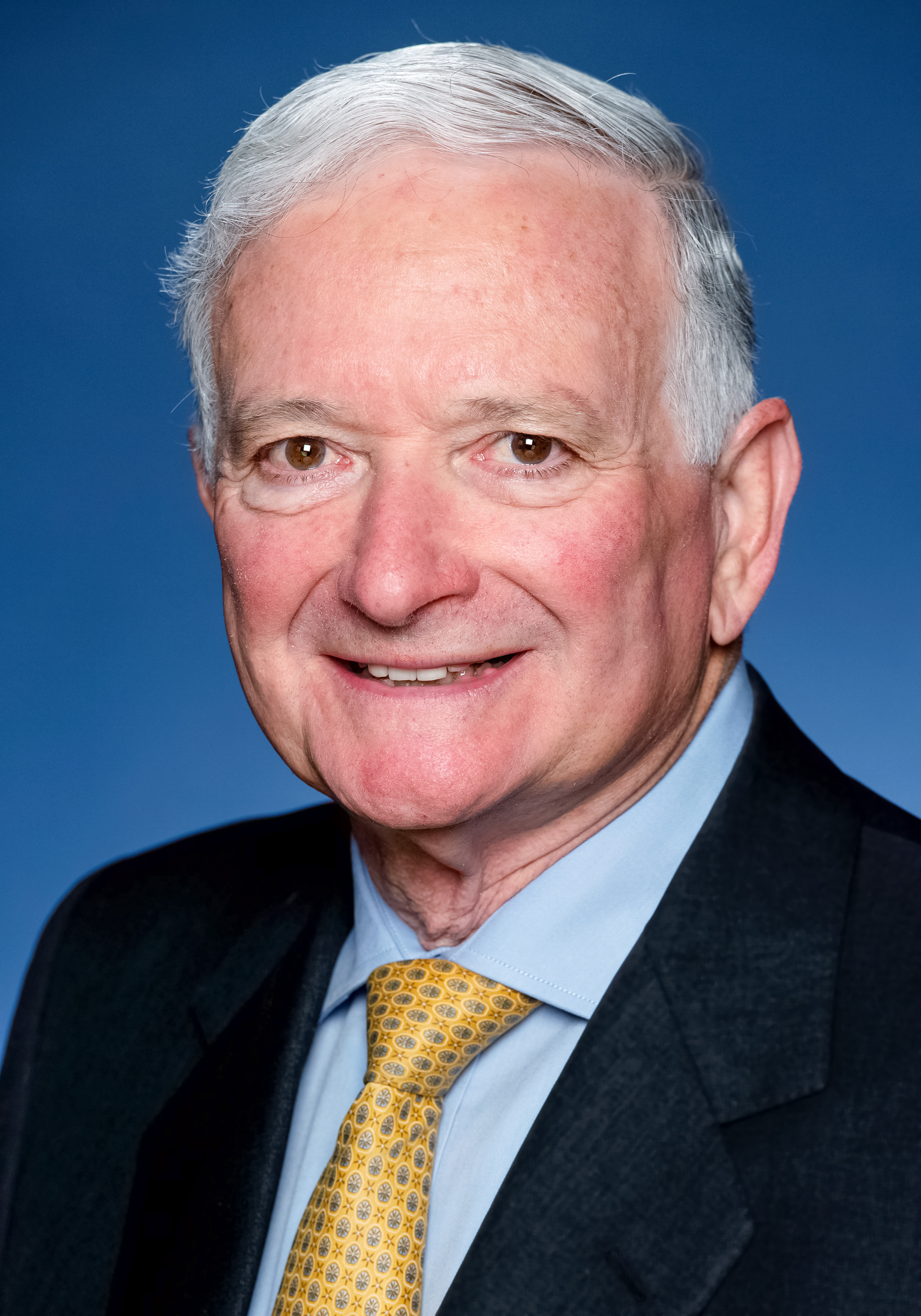

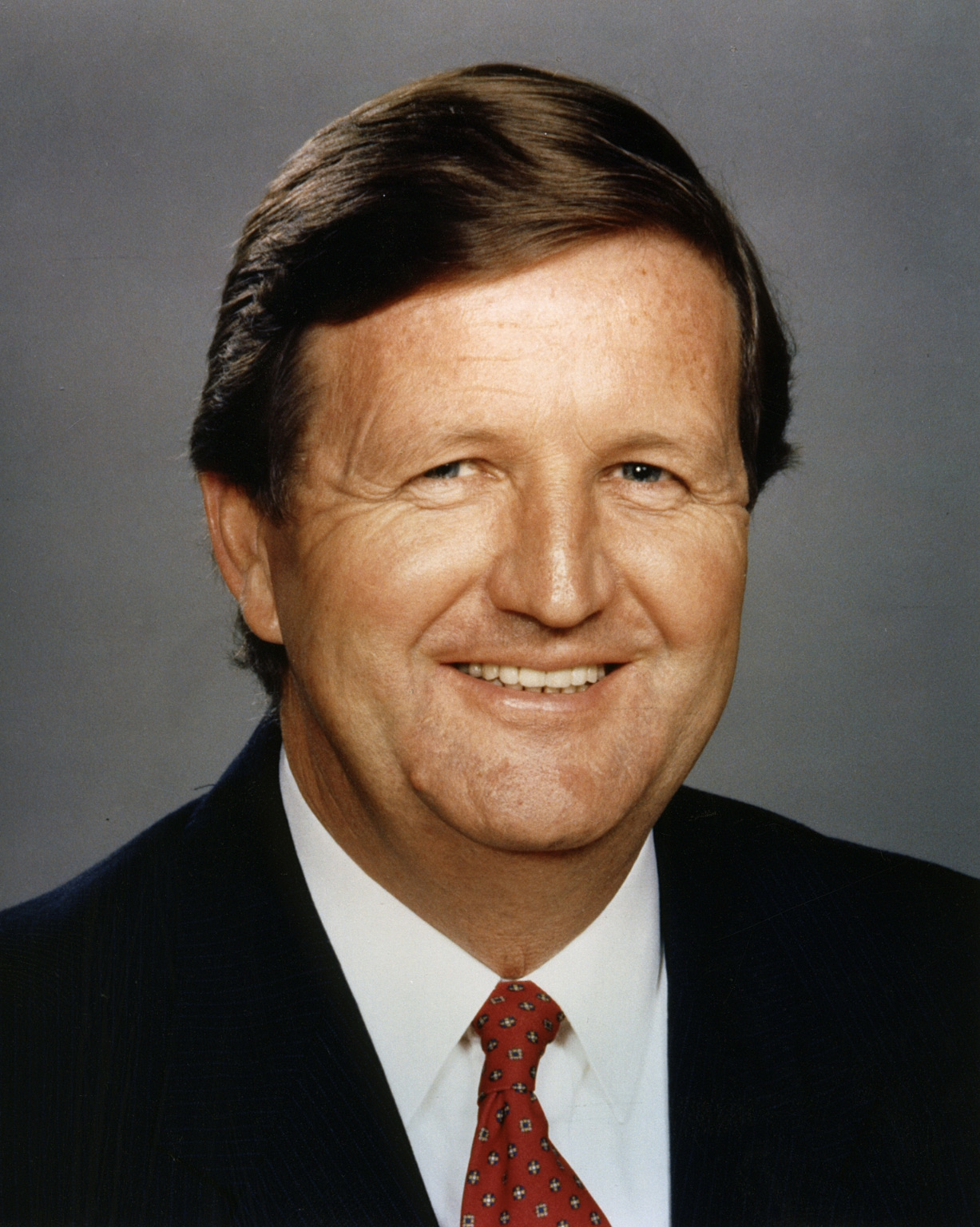
	First party	Second party
Leader	Nick Greiner	Barrie Unsworth
Party	Liberal/National coalition	Labor
Leader since	15 March 1983	4 July 1986
Leader's seat	Ku-ring-gai	Rockdale
Last election	37 seats	58 seats
Seats before	38 seats	56 seats
Seats won	59	43
Seat change	▲21	▼13
Popular vote	1,588,095	1,233,612
Percentage	49.54%	38.48%
Swing	▲6.52	▼10.27
TPP	55.96%	44.02%
TPP swing	▲8.40	▼8.40
- Two-candidate-preferred margin by electorate
Premier before election
Barrie Unsworth
Labor
Elected Premier
Nick Greiner
Liberal/National coalition

Elections to the 49th Parliament of New South Wales were held on Saturday 19 March 1988. All seats in the Legislative Assembly and a third of the seats in the Legislative Council were up for election. The Labor government of Premier Barrie Unsworth was defeated by the Liberal–National Coalition, led by Opposition Leader Nick Greiner in a landslide victory against Labor.

The election took place following a redistribution of seats, which resulted in the Assembly growing from 99 to 109 seats.

== Issues ==
The Labor Party, under Neville Wran and, since 1986, Barrie Unsworth, had been in office for 12 years. A number of corruption scandals had tarnished Labor's image. Among these was the jailing of Labor's Minister for Corrective Services Rex Jackson in 1987 for accepting bribes for the early release of prisoners.

Even before then, two by-elections in 1986 indicated that NSW voters were about to call time on the three-term Labor government. When Unsworth, then a member of the New South Wales Legislative Council, ran for the previously safe Labor Assembly seat of Rockdale in 1986, he only won it by 54 votes after losing more than 17 percent of Labor's primary vote from 1981. Additionally, Labor suffered a 22-percent primary vote swing in Wran's old seat of Bass Hill, allowing the Liberals to take it on a 103-vote margin. However, by-elections in Heathcote and Bankstown in 1987 saw only small swings against the government.

The Liberals' campaign slogan was "A change for the better". Greiner campaigned on a promise to clean up state government, foreshadowing the establishment of the Independent Commission Against Corruption, as well as promising to freeze government expenditure, create 16,000 new employment and training positions, and pay more attention to law enforcement.

In rural electorates, Labor's positions on gun laws and conservation alienated many voters. Health care was also a campaign issue.

Future Liberal Prime Minister Tony Abbott admitted in 2005 that he voted Labor at this election saying that Unsworth "was the best deal premier that New South Wales had ever had" and knew that it would not damage Greiner's prospects at this election.

== Key dates ==
Date	Event
22 February 1988	The Legislative Assembly was dissolved, and writs were issued by the Governor to proceed with an election.
26 February 1988	Nominations for candidates for the election closed at noon.
19 March 1988	Polling day, between the hours of 8am and 6pm.
25 March 1988	The Unsworth ministry resigned and the Greiner-Murray ministry was sworn in.
22 April 1988	The writ was returned and the results formally declared.
27 April 1988	Parliament resumed for business.

== Results ==
=== Legislative Assembly ===
The result was a landslide for the Coalition parties. Election analyst Antony Green later noted that "the 1988 result was startling, the worst Labor performance, and best Coalition result, since the Lang era of the 1930s". Labor lost heartland seats including Balmain, Newcastle and Swansea for the first time since the turn of the century.

Seven non-aligned Independents were elected to the Legislative Assembly.

Party	Votes	%	+/–	Seats	+/–
Labor	1,233,612	38.48	▼10.27	43	▼13
Liberal	1,147,613	35.80	▲3.62	39	▲16
National	440,482	13.74	▲2.90	20	▲5
Independents	261,719	8.16	▲3.08	7	▲3
Democrats	58,163	1.81	▼1.03	0	0
Independent EFF	39,194	1.22	New	0	New
Call to Australia	14,205	0.44	▲0.37	0	0
Illawarra Workers Party	6,755	0.21	New	0	New
Socialist	2,717	0.08	▼0.05	0	0
Nuclear Disarmament	1,064	0.03	New	0	New
Total	3,205,524	100.00	–	109	–
Valid votes	3,205,524	98.05			
Invalid/blank votes	63,870	1.95	▲0.84		
Total votes	3,269,394	100.00	–		
Registered voters/turnout	3,541,447	92.32	▲1.07		
Two-party-preferred
Liberal/National Coalition	1,725,936	55.96	▲8.4		
Labor	1,358,049	44.04	▼8.4		
Total	3,083,985	100.00	–		

Popular vote
Labor	38.48%
Liberal	35.80%
National	13.74%
Independents	8.16%
Democrats	1.81%
Independent EFF	1.22%
Others	0.77%
Two-party-preferred vote
Coalition	55.96%
Labor	44.04%
Parliamentary seats
Labor	43
Liberal	39
National	20
Independents	7

=== Legislative Council ===
Party	Votes	%	+/–	Seats			
Party	Votes	%	+/–	Seats Won	Not Up	Total Seats	Seat Change
Liberal National Coalition	1,403,300	46.01	▲3.54	7	12	19	▲1
Labor	1,140,634	37.40	▼9.37	6	15	21	▼3
Call to Australia	174,553	5.72	▼0.35	1	2	3	▲1
Democrats	90,634	2.97	▼0.42	1	1	2	▲1
Independent EFF	72,965	2.39	New	0	0	0	New
Community Independents	52,992	1.74	New	0	0	0	New
Environment Group	48,536	1.59	New	0	0	0	New
Nuclear Disarmament	28,161	0.92	New	0	0	0	New
Aboriginal Team	13,363	0.44	New	0	0	0	New
Humanist Party	11,895	0.39	New	0	0	0	New
Defence Ex-Service Team	6,970	0.23	New	0	0	0	New
Independents	3,396	0.11	▼0.31	0	0	0	0
Marijuana	2,713	0.09	▲0.09	0	0	0	0
Total	3,050,112	100.00	–	15	30	45	–
Valid votes	3,050,112	91.95					
Invalid/blank votes	267,113	8.05	▲1.42				
Total votes	3,317,225	100.00	–				
Registered voters/turnout	3,541,447	93.67	▼0.60				

== Seats changing hands ==
Seat	Pre-1988			Swing	Post-1988		
Seat	Party	Member	Margin	Swing	Margin	Member	Party
Albury	Labor	Harold Mair	2.1	-13.8	11.7	Ian Glachan	Liberal
Ballina	Independent*	new seat	N/A	N/A	18.0	Don Page	National
Balmain	Labor	Peter Crawford	19.3	-21.0	1.7	Dawn Fraser	Independent
Bass Hill ¶	Liberal	Michael Owen	18.4 (ALP)	-14.1	4.3	Bill Lovelee	Labor
Bathurst	Labor	Mick Clough	7.6	-9.8	2.2	David Berry	Liberal
Bligh	Liberal	Michael Yabsley	0.2	-0.8	0.6	Clover Moore	Independent
Blue Mountains	Labor	Bob Debus	4.6	-4.9	0.3	Barry Morris	Liberal
Burrinjuck	Labor	Terry Sheahan	4.9	-8.6	3.7	Alby Schultz	Liberal
Cessnock	Labor	Stan Neilly	8.9	-9.4	0.5	Bob Roberts	Liberal
Earlwood	Labor	Ken Gabb	5.9	-7.2	1.3	Phil White	Liberal
Georges River	Labor	Frank Walker	5.9	-8.0	2.1	Terry Griffiths	Liberal
Gladesville	Labor	Rodney Cavalier	5.3	-8.3	3.0	Ivan Petch	Liberal
Gosford	Labor	Brian McGowan*	0.9	-8.7	7.8	Chris Hartcher	Liberal
Heathcote	Labor	Ian McManus*	5.1	-6.9	1.8	Allan Andrews	Liberal
Lismore	Independent	Bruce Duncan	N/A	N/A	19.9	Bill Rixon	National
Minchinbury	Labor	new seat	10.4	-12.9	2.5	Anne Cohen	Liberal
Monaro	Labor	John Akister	8.0	-11.9	3.9	Peter Cochran	National
Newcastle	Labor	Arthur Wade	14.5	-19.8	5.3	George Keegan	Independent
Parramatta	Labor	Barry Wilde	5.4	-5.9	0.5	John Books	Liberal
Penrith	Labor	Peter Anderson	8.1	-10.3	2.2	Guy Matheson	Liberal
Ryde	Labor	Garry McIlwaine	5.1	-5.3	0.2	Michael Photios	Liberal
Sutherland	Labor	Maurie Keane	5.1	-7.6	2.5	Chris Downy	Liberal
Swansea	Labor	Don Bowman	18.7	-27.1	8.4	Ivan Welsh	Independent
The Entrance	Labor	new seat	7.9	-9.9	2.0	Bob Graham	Liberal

- Members listed in italics did not recontest their seats.
- Ballina was a new seat created from much of the area of the old district of Lismore, which was held by Independent member Bruce Duncan, who retired from politics at this election.
- The sitting Labor member for Gosford, Brian McGowan instead contested the new seat of The Entrance and lost.
- The sitting Labor member for Heathcote, Ian McManus instead contested the new seat of Burragorang and won.
- In addition, the National party held the seat of Northern Tablelands, which it had won from Labor in the 1987 by-election.

¶ Bass Hill was won by the Liberal party in the 1986 by-election. It was regained by Labor in this election.

=== Redistribution affected seats ===
Seat	1984 election			1986 redistribution			Swing	1988 election		
Seat	Party	Member	Margin	Party	Member	Margin	Swing	Margin	Member	Party
Camden	Liberal	John Fahey	5.2	Labor	Notional	5.8	-5.7	0.1	Peter Primrose	Labor
Wollongong	Independent	Frank Arkell	4.2	Labor	Notional	4.7	-10.2	5.5	Frank Arkell	Independent

== Post-election pendulum ==
Liberal/National seats (59)
Marginal
Ryde	Michael Photios	LIB	0.2%
Blue Mountains	Barry Morris	LIB	0.3%
Parramatta	John Books	LIB	0.5%
Cessnock	Bob Roberts	LIB	0.5%
Earlwood	Phil White	LIB	1.3%
Heathcote	Allan Andrews	LIB	1.8%
The Entrance	Bob Graham	LIB	2.0%
Georges River	Terry Griffiths	LIB	2.1%
Penrith	Guy Matheson	LIB	2.2%
Bathurst	David Berry	LIB	2.2%
Sutherland	Chris Downy	LIB	2.5%
Minchinbury	Anne Cohen	LIB	2.5%
Gladesville	Ivan Petch	LIB	3.0%
Burrinjuck	Alby Schultz	LIB	3.7%
Monaro	Peter Cochran	NAT	3.9%
Fairly safe
Hurstville	Guy Yeomans	LIB	6.4%
Wakehurst	John Booth	LIB	7.5%
Gosford	Chris Hartcher	LIB	7.8%
Safe
Murwillumbah	Don Beck	NAT	10.1%
Pittwater	Jim Longley	LIB	10.1% v IND
Miranda	Ron Phillips	LIB	11.5%
Cronulla	Malcolm Kerr	LIB	11.6%
Albury	Ian Glachan	LIB	11.7%
Manly	David Hay	LIB	12.2%
Strathfield	Paul Zammit	LIB	12.8%
Davidson	Terry Metherell	LIB	14.0% v IND
Hornsby	Neil Pickard	LIB	14.7%
Clarence	Ian Causley	NAT	15.0%
Southern Highlands	John Fahey	LIB	16.8%
Eastwood	Andrew Tink	LIB	17.6%
Upper Hunter	George Souris	NAT	17.8%
Ballina	Don Page	NAT	18.0%
Carlingford	Wayne Merton	LIB	18.2%
Murrumbidgee	Adrian Cruickshank	NAT	18.4%
Bega	Russell Smith	LIB	18.7%
Northern Tablelands	Ray Chappell	NAT	19.0%
Goulburn	Robert Webster	NAT	19.3%
Port Macquarie	Bruce Jeffery	NAT	19.4%
Myall Lakes	John Turner	NAT	19.9%
Lismore	Bill Rixon	NAT	19.9%
Middle Harbour	Peter Collins	LIB	21.2%
Dubbo	Gerry Peacocke	NAT	21.3%
Coffs Harbour	Matt Singleton	NAT	21.4%
Castlereagh	Roger Wotton	NAT	21.9%
Hawkesbury	Kevin Rozzoli	LIB	22.1%
Orange	Garry West	NAT	22.5%
Wagga Wagga	Joe Schipp	LIB	22.6%
Lane Cove	John Dowd	LIB	22.6%
Lachlan	Ian Armstrong	NAT	23.6%
Mosman	Phillip Smiles	LIB	23.9%
Manning	Wendy Machin	NAT	23.9%
Barwon	Wal Murray	NAT	24.3%
Tamworth	Noel Park	NAT	25.4%
The Hills	Fred Caterson	LIB	25.9%
Northcott	Bruce Baird	LIB	26.0%
Murray	Jim Small	NAT	27.0%
Vaucluse	Ray Aston	LIB	27.2%
Ku-ring-gai	Nick Greiner	LIB	29.7%
Gordon	Tim Moore	LIB	32.9%

Labor seats (43)
Marginal
Camden	Peter Primrose	ALP	0.1%
Charlestown	Richard Face	ALP	0.1%
Port Stephens	Bob Martin	ALP	0.2%
Waverley	Ernie Page	ALP	0.5%
Keira	Col Markham	ALP	0.8%
Maitland	Allan Walsh	ALP	0.8%
Ashfield	Paul Whelan	ALP	1.2%
Coogee	Michael Cleary	ALP	1.2%
Broken Hill	Bill Beckroge	ALP	2.0%
Drummoyne	John Murray	ALP	2.1%
Kogarah	Brian Langton	ALP	2.2%
Lakemba	Wes Davoren	ALP	2.6%
Londonderry	Paul Gibson	ALP	3.0%
Canterbury	Kevin Moss	ALP	3.4% v EFF
Fairfield	Geoff Irwin	ALP	3.9%
Wentworthville	Pam Allan	ALP	3.9%
Bass Hill	Bill Lovelee	ALP	4.3%
Illawarra	Terry Rumble	ALP	4.4%
Wyong	Harry Moore	ALP	4.5%
Macquarie Fields	Stan Knowles	ALP	4.9%
Seven Hills	Bob Christie	ALP	5.0%
Mulgoa	Tony Aquilina	ALP	5.5%
Campbelltown	Michael Knight	ALP	5.7%
Fairly safe
Lake Macquarie	Merv Hunter	ALP	6.4%
Burragorang	Ian McManus	ALP	6.6%
Cabramatta	John Newman	ALP	6.6%
McKell	Sandra Nori	ALP	6.6% v IND
Rockdale	Barrie Unsworth	ALP	7.0
Riverstone	Richard Amery	ALP	7.2
East Hills	Pat Rogan	ALP	7.4
Peats	Tony Doyle	ALP	7.5
Bankstown	Doug Shedden	ALP	9.2
Blacktown	John Aquilina	ALP	9.2
Heffron	Laurie Brereton	ALP	9.2
Wallsend	Ken Booth	ALP	9.4
Safe
Maroubra	Bob Carr	ALP	10.4%
Auburn	Peter Nagle	ALP	10.7%
Smithfield	Janice Crosio	ALP	10.8%
Granville	Laurie Ferguson	ALP	10.9%
Kiama	Bob Harrison	ALP	11.4%
Waratah	John Price	ALP	11.4%
Liverpool	George Paciullo	ALP	14.1%
Marrickville	Andrew Refshauge	ALP	15.5%
Crossbench seats (7)
Bligh	Clover Moore	IND	0.6% v LIB
Balmain	Dawn Fraser	IND	1.7% v ALP
Newcastle	George Keegan	IND	5.3% v ALP
Wollongong	Frank Arkell	IND	5.5% v ALP
Swansea	Ivan Welsh	IND	8.4% v ALP
North Shore	Ted Mack	IND	9.9% v LIB
South Coast	John Hatton	IND	14.7% v LIB

== See also ==
- Candidates of the 1988 New South Wales state election
