= Bavin ministry =

- 44th Cabinet of the State of New South Wales

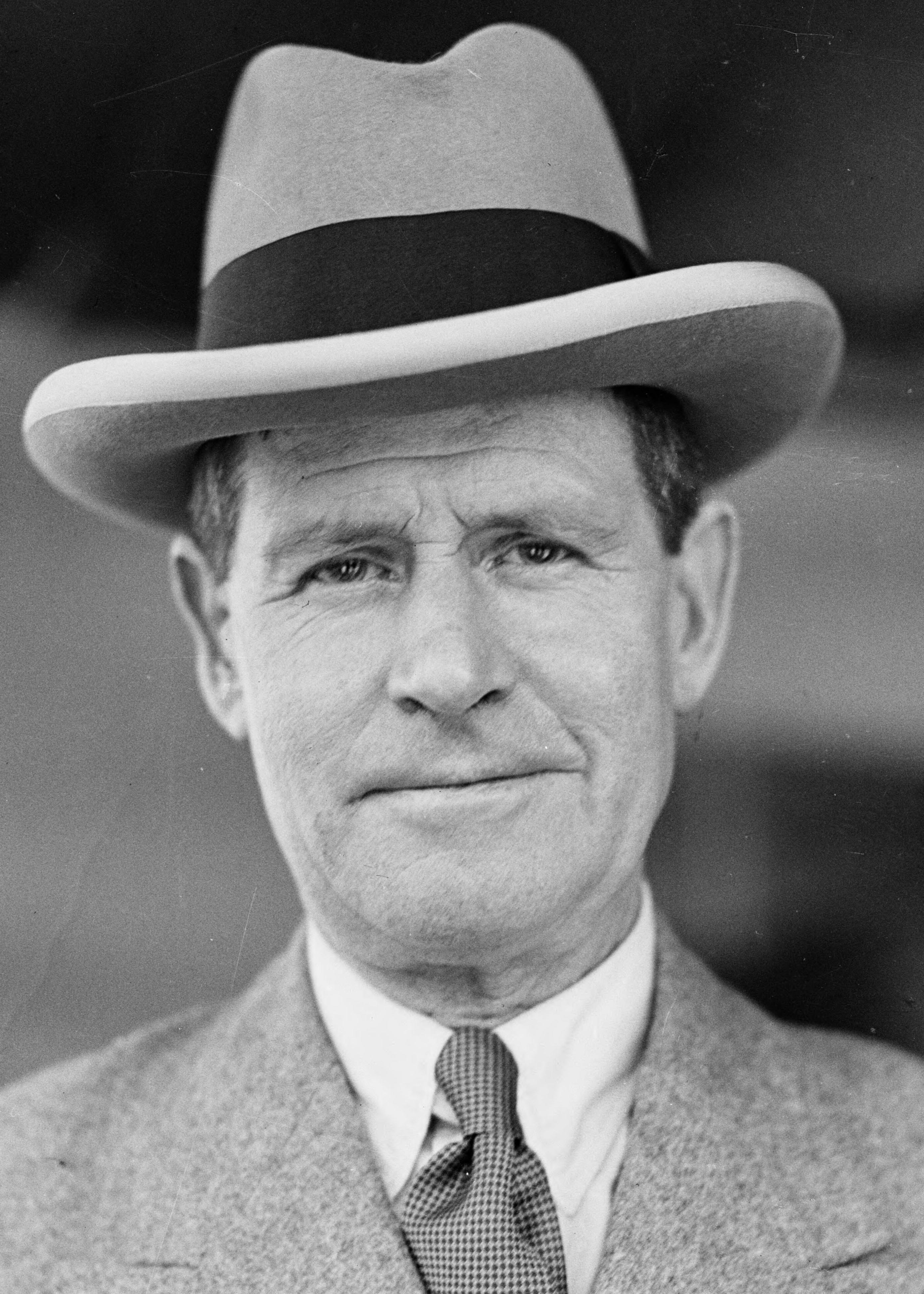
- Premier Thomas Bavin
- Date formed: 18 October 1927
- Date dissolved: 3 November 1930

People and organisations
- Monarch: George V
- Governor: Sir Dudley de Chair / Sir Phillip Game
- Head of government: Thomas Bavin
- No. of ministers: 12
- Member party: Nationalist
- Status in legislature: Majority government
- Opposition party: Labor
- Opposition leader: Jack Lang

History
- Election: 1927 New South Wales election
- Predecessor: Lang ministry (1927)
- Successor: Lang ministry (1930-1932)

The Bavin ministry was the 44th ministry of the New South Wales Government, and was led by the 24th Premier, Thomas Bavin, in a Nationalist coalition with the Country Party, led by Ernest Buttenshaw.

Bavin was first elected to the New South Wales Legislative Assembly in 1917 and served continuously until 1935. Having served as a senior minister in the first and second Fuller ministries, in 1925 Bavin was elected leader of the Nationalist Party in New South Wales and became Leader of the Opposition. Buttenshaw was also first elected to the Assembly in 1917 and served continuously until 1938. Initially a member of the Nationalist Party, in 1922 he helped establish the Progressive Party and became a member of its successor, the Country Party, and elected as party leader in 1925.

Following an agreement by the Nationalist and Country parties not to stand candidates against each other, the coalition won the 1927 state election, defeating the Labor government led by Jack Lang. Bavin became Premier and Colonial Treasurer; and Buttenshaw, a senior minister.

This ministry covers the period from 18 October 1927 until 3 November 1930 when the 1930 state election was held in the wake of the Great Depression resulting in the loss of the Coalition, with Lang regaining government as the third Lang ministry.

== Composition of ministry ==
The composition of the ministry was announced by Premier Bavin on 18 October 1927 and covers the period up to 3 November 1930.

Portfolio	Minister	Party	Term commence	Term end	Term of office
Premier	Thomas Bavin	Nationalist	18 October 1927	3 November 1930	3 years, 16 days
Treasurer	Thomas Bavin	Nationalist	18 October 1927	15 April 1929	1 year, 179 days
Treasurer	Bertram Stevens	Nationalist	16 April 1929	3 November 1930	1 year, 201 days
Assistant Treasurer	Bertram Stevens	Nationalist	18 October 1927	15 April 1929	1 year, 179 days
Secretary for Public Works	Ernest Buttenshaw	Country	18 October 1927	3 November 1930	3 years, 16 days
Minister for Railways (Note: Ernest Buttenshaw resigned the portfolio of Minister for Railways on 16 April 1929, but no other Minister was allotted that portfolio, the Railways being administered by the Colonial Treasurer, except in regard to Railway Construction, which remained with the Secretary for Public Works.)	Ernest Buttenshaw	Country	18 October 1927	16 April 1929	1 year, 180 days
Attorney General; Vice-president of the Executive Council; Representative of the Government in Legislative Council	Francis Boyce, MLC	Nationalist	18 October 1927	3 November 1930	3 years, 16 days
Chief Secretary	Albert Bruntnell (Note: Died in office.)	Nationalist	18 October 1927	31 January 1929	1 year, 105 days
Chief Secretary	Thomas Bavin	Nationalist	1 February 1929	15 April 1929	73 days
Chief Secretary	Frank Chaffey	Nationalist	16 April 1929	3 November 1930	1 year, 201 days
Minister for Lands	Richard Ball	Nationalist	18 October 1927	3 November 1930	3 years, 16 days
Minister for Agriculture	Harold Thorby	Country	18 October 1927	3 November 1930	3 years, 16 days
Minister for Education	David Drummond	Country	18 October 1927	3 November 1930	3 years, 16 days
Minister for Local Government	Michael Bruxner	Country	18 October 1927	3 November 1930	3 years, 16 days
Secretary for Mines; Minister for Forests	Frank Chaffey	Nationalist	18 October 1927	15 April 1929	1 year, 179 days
Secretary for Mines; Minister for Forests	Reginald Weaver	Nationalist	16 April 1929	3 November 1930	1 year, 201 days
Minister of Justice	John Lee	Nationalist	18 October 1927	3 November 1930	3 years, 16 days
Minister for Labour and Industry	Ernest Farrar, MLC	Nationalist	18 October 1927	3 November 1930	3 years, 16 days
Minister for Public Health	Richard Arthur	Nationalist	18 October 1927	3 November 1930	3 years, 16 days
Honorary Minister	James Ryan, MLC	Nationalist	18 October 1927	3 November 1930	3 years, 16 days

Ministers are members of the Legislative Assembly unless otherwise noted.

== See also ==
- Members of the New South Wales Legislative Assembly, 1927-1930
- Members of the New South Wales Legislative Council, 1927-1930

Preceded by Lang ministry (1927)	Bavin ministry 1927–1930	Succeeded by Lang ministry (1930-1932)
