= Lawrence Borthwick Kelly =

Lawrence Borthwick Kelly may refer to:

- Laurie Kelly Sr. (1883–1955), Australian politician
- Laurie Kelly (politician) (1928–2018), his son, Australian politician
