= Philip Benwell =

Australian monarchist and activist

Philip Gordon James Benwell MBE is an advocate of Constitutional monarchy in Australia and has served as the National Chairman of the Australian Monarchist League since its founding in 1993.

Benwell worked as a banker in the late 1960s until the mid-1970s. For his contribution to the Australian banking community Benwell was honoured on the 1976 Queen's Birthday Honours list as a Member of the Order of the British Empire.

During his time as a banker he joined the Liberal Party of Australia. In 1973 he ran for the Electoral district of Heathcote in the New South Wales Legislative Assembly, coming second with 28.6% of the primary vote and losing to Rex Jackson of the Labor Party. In 1974 he ran for the Hughes in the Parliament of Australia, coming second with 31.4% of the vote and losing to Les Johnson of the Labor Party.

Benwell has promoted and argued in favour of the preservation of the Monarchy of Australia in various capacities including speaking at Conservative Constitution Committee and the Cross Benches of the House of Lords, and supporting the No Vote during the 1999 Republic Referendum.

== Selected works ==
Benwell has authored a number of books on Australian constitutional history and the Monarchy of Australia.

- Benwell, Philip (2016). Australia ~ Our Country ~ Our Constitution ~ Our Governance. Philip Benwell. ISBN 978-0646963303.
- Benwell, Philip (12 September 2014). A Very Public Affair: The Crown and the Australian Constitution. BookBaby. ISBN 9781925171471.
- Benwell, Philip (2003). In defence of Australia's constitutional monarchy. Mellen Press. ISBN 0773466967.
