= Australian Monarchist League =

Voluntary association promoting the Australia's monarchy

- Predecessor: Branch of the Monarchist League
- Formation: 1993; 33 years ago
- Type: Voluntary association
- Registration no.: ABN: 50 476 001 156; NSW incorporation no.: INC9888784
- Legal status: Unincorporated association
- Purpose: Promotion of Australia's constitutional monarchy
- Headquarters: Sydney, Australia
- Chairman: Philip Benwell
- National spokespersons: Eric Abetz; Jarrod Bleijie; Beverley McArthur; Rachel Merton
- Website: www.monarchist.org.au

The Australian Monarchist League (AML) is a voluntary association that advocates for the retention of Australia's constitutional monarchy. The organisation supported the "No" vote in the 1999 republic referendum, which asked citizens whether the Australian Constitution should be amended to make Australia a republic.

== Structure ==
The Australian Monarchist League is incorporated in New South Wales. Originally a branch of the London-based Monarchist League, later the International Monarchist League (IML), the league severed any affiliation with the IML and established itself as an independent Australian body. (Note: A separate organisation, the International Monarchist League in Australia, was formed in 2006 as an affiliate of the IML.) The organisation is not formally associated with any political party or other organisation, and it has no paid staff, relying on volunteers to keep the group functioning. The league is governed by a National Council comprising representatives from branches in each state and territory. All positions in the league are subject to election in accordance with the league's constitution.

The elected chairman and CEO of the league is Philip Benwell who has served on a volunteer basis for over 25 years. In 1978, Benwell was charged with fraudulent misappropriation and obtaining money under false pretences. He fled to Sri Lanka, where his family owned tea plantations. He was eventually extradited back to Australia in 1987, after a period of imprisonment at Welikada Prison, but was never prosecuted for the earlier charges. When it was feared that the press was about to publish details of this, Benwell stood aside from being chairman during the height of the 1999 referendum campaign.

== Chairs ==
#	Chair	Start	End	Time in position
1	Philip Benwell MBE	1993	present	33 years

== Activities ==
=== 1999 republic referendum ===
During the 1998 Constitutional Convention on the future of Australia's constitutional monarchy, the league along with the five other constitutional monarchist groups formed a united front led by Lloyd Waddy QC, the National Convenor of Australians for Constitutional Monarchy which was by far the dominant monarchist group. Positions on the official Vote No Committee were filled according to votes received at the Convention election where the league had won 6.05% of the vote. Accordingly, all eight monarchist seats went to an alternative organization which had won 72.39% of the monarchist vote, Australians for Constitutional Monarchy (along with two supporting an elected head of state). Nevertheless, the Australian Monarchist League played a role in the proceedings, including Benwell privately taking the Australian Electoral Commission to the Federal Court in an unsuccessful attempt to gain a firmer definition of what would count as a "yes" vote in the referendum, arguing that the planned approach (accepting any vote in which the voter's intention was clear) was such that the counting would be weighted towards "yes" and "opened the door for electoral fraud".

=== Post-1999 actions ===
Both prior and subsequent to the referendum, the Australian Monarchist League has acted to protect the image of the constitutional monarchy. Some examples of successes in this area include complaints lodged by the organisation in 2005 regarding an image depicting Princess Diana by photographer Erwin Olaf at the Australian Centre for Photography. Similarly, they wrote to the Japanese ambassador in 1998 after Toyota ran an advertisement showing a Range Rover with the words "Don't worry, Your Majesty, you're not the only British export that's had its day", resulting in Toyota withdrawing the advertisement and in 2008 complained to both the Coopers Brewery and the Advertising Standards Bureau after Coopers ran an advertisement stating "Forget the monarchy, support the publicans", forcing its withdrawal. The league continues to maintain vigilance, more recently lodging complaints against the ABC, claiming bias.

Along with their actions during the referendum, the league have been active in protecting the symbols of Australia's constitutional monarchy; they acted to ensure that the pledge of loyalty to the monarch remained a part of Scouts Australia, and spoke against the removal of references to the Queen from the Victorian legal system. Aside from campaigning, the AML distributed copies of William Dargie's portrait of Queen Elizabeth II after the Commonwealth Government Bookshops ceased selling photographs of the monarch.

=== Recent activities ===
Other activities include disseminating literature and maintaining a library on Australian history and the Australian Constitution and conducting public seminars.

The league condemned Prime Minister Anthony Albanese in June 2022 for the appointment of Matt Thistlethwaite as Assistant Minister for the Republic.

Following the coverage of the Coronation of King Charles III on the 6 May 2023, the league accused the ABC of "despicable" news coverage of the coronation and claimed that it was biased. Resultingly, the league submitted a signed letter of dissatisfaction from members to the Chair of the ABC later that month, demanding an apology. From this, the ABC completed an internal investigation into the way the Coronation was broadcast after 1,000 people voiced their disproval of the coverage.

=== Petition to Reform the Appointment of the Governor-General ===
The Australian Monarchist League has expressed concern over the modern process by which the Governor-General of Australia is nominated. In a public petition, the League referenced the 1930 nomination of Sir Isaac Isaacs by Prime Minister James Scullin as a turning point in Australia's constitutional history. Isaacs was the first Australian-born Governor-General, and his appointment—made against initial reservations from King George V—marked the beginning of Australia's direct involvement in such nominations.

The League criticises the shift towards unilateral nominations by prime ministers, citing Bob Hawke’s 1988 selection of Bill Hayden as an example of diminished consultation. It argues that this concentration of authority undermines democratic principles and the impartiality expected of the office.

In response, the League advocates for reform of the nomination process. Rather than an election or parliamentary vote—which it views as potentially politicizing—the League proposes a model based on bipartisan consensus between the prime minister and the leader of the opposition. According to the League, such an approach would help preserve the confidentiality and dignity of the office, avoid contentious appointments, and reinforce the non-political nature of the Governor-General’s role.

== Membership ==
As of 2005, the league had approximately 100 financial members, 20,000 official members and a support base of over 53,000 people.

=== Notable members and patrons ===
- Eric Abetz
- Tony Abbott AC
- John Howard OM AC
- Sir John Fuller
- Pro Hart MBE
- Malcolm Murray, 12th Earl of Dunmore
- Bruce Ruxton AM OBE
- Nancy Wake AC GM
- David Leach AC CBE LVO
- Lady Mary Fairfax AC OBE
- Noël Deschamps

== See also ==
- Constitutional history of Australia
- Constitutional monarchy
- Australians for Constitutional Monarchy
- 1999 Australian republic referendum
- Australian constitutional history
- Commonwealth realms
- Statute of Westminster Adoption Act 1942
- Republicanism in Australia
