= Maryanne Stuart =

Australian politician

Maryanne Stuart MP

Member of the New South Wales Assembly for Heathcote
- Incumbent
- Assumed office 25 March 2023
- Preceded by: Lee Evans

Personal details
- Party: Labor
- Spouse: Russell
- Children: 2
- Occupation: Organiser

Maryanne Norma Stuart is an Australian politician. She was elected a member of the New South Wales Legislative Assembly representing Heathcote for the Labor Party in 2023.

== Education ==
Stuart was educated at St John Bosco College, Engadine and studied Labor Relations and Human Resource Management at TAFE NSW. She studied Industrial Law at University of Technology Sydney and politics and history at Macquarie University.

== Career ==
Stuart joined the New South Wales Labor Party in the late 1980s and worked as an electorate officer in the office of Ian McManus, the state member for Heathcote, from 1999. She worked as a Training and Education Officer and Organiser at the Rail Tram and Bus Union from 2010. She resigned from the position in 2015 after she was endorsed as the Labor Party's candidate for the Heathcote at the 2015 state election at which she was defeated by the then-incumbent, Lee Evans.

Stuart subsequently worked as a Campaign Organiser for the Australian Council of Trade Unions from 2015 to 2017. In February 2018 she commenced work as a Lead Organiser for the Public Service Association of NSW. She resigned from this position after being endorsed again as the Labor candidate for the Heathcote at the 2019 state election at which she was again defeated by Evans.

Following this Stuart commenced work as a lead community organiser for the Australian Conservation Foundation in November 2019. In 2022, she took a leave of absence from this role to seek preselection for a third time as the Labor candidate for Heathcote at the 2023 election. She was endorsed for this position and won the seat.

New South Wales Legislative Assembly
Preceded by Lee Evans	Member for Heathcote; 2023–present	Incumbent
