= Allan Andrews (politician) =

Australian politician

Allan Andrews (born 15 September 1940) is a former Australian politician. A member of the Liberal Party, he represented the electoral district of Heathcote in the New South Wales Legislative Assembly for a single term, from 1988 to 1991.

Andrews was born in Bargo, where his father worked. The family moved to Heathcote, in Sydney, in 1943. Andrews attended public school in Heathcote, and went on to further education at St George Technical College. After completing his education, Andrews worked as a self-employed electrical contractor.

Andrews was elected to the Sutherland Shire Council as an Independent candidate in 1974, and served there for the next thirteen years, including a two-year stint as Council President. He joined the Liberal Party in 1986, and was soon chosen to contest the seat of Heathcote, which was up for by-election following the August 1986 resignation of disgraced former Labor Minister Rex Jackson. The Labor government delayed the by-election as long as possible, arguing that it was not possible to hold an election during Jackson's trial or while Parliament was sitting. The Leader of the Opposition, Nick Greiner, rejected this argument, declaring that the election was only delayed in an attempt to allow any bad press from the corruption trial to die down. The election finally came on 31 January 1987, and was rarely short of drama: Jackson, with criminal charges hanging over his head, entered as a spoiler candidate; the Liberals found themselves in hot water over an illegally large billboard prominently placed on the electorate's border over the Princes Highway; and the ALP were accused of sabotage after vandals cut loose from its moorings a Liberal advertising blimp. In the election itself, Andrews garnered more than 8,000 of the approximately 28,000 votes cast and narrowly missed out to Labor candidate Ian McManus.

When the seat came up for re-election in 1988, McManus had moved to the newly created safe seat of Burragorang, and redistribution of boundaries had made winning Heathcote a much less daunting prospect for the Liberals. Andrews defeated Labor's rearguard candidate Peter Predsee, becoming the first Liberal candidate to win a seat in the Illawarra region and the first non-Labor member for the seat of Heathcote.

On 25 September 1990, the Greiner Liberal Government announced a controversial redistribution proposal to reduce the number of seats, and MPs, from 109 to 99 after the upcoming election. Andrews was one of five Liberal MPs to see his district cut out from under him, a prospect he decried in the run-up to the 1991 NSW election. At the expiration of his term, Andrews was requested to run for the nearby but traditionally safe Labor district of Coogee. With the odds against him – Andrews moved to the district two months before the election, and came up against Ernie Page, a Labor institution in the electorate – he came close to winning, missing out by 600 votes after preferences.

After leaving politics, Andrews continued to serve in the NSW government, this time as policy analyst for the NSW Water board. Upon hearing of Andrews' appointment, the Labor Party, then in Opposition, argued that it was just a case of "jobs for the boys", saying that the normal hiring procedures had been bypassed in Andrews' case. The Government responded by saying that Andrews had earned the job on his own merit, and that positions such as his were not normally advertised anyway.

New South Wales Legislative Assembly
Preceded by Ian McManus	Member for Heathcote; 1988–1991	Succeeded by Seat abolished
