= Electoral district of Burragorang =

State electoral district of New South Wales, Australia

Burragorang was an electoral district of the Legislative Assembly in the Australian State of New South Wales for a single term from 1988 to 1991, named after the Burragorang Valley of the Wingecarribee River. Its only member was Ian McManus.

== Members for Burragorang ==
| Member | Party | Term |
|---|---|---|
| Ian McManus | Labor | 1988–1991 |

== Election results ==
=== 1988 ===
1988 New South Wales state election: Burragorang
| Party | Candidate | Votes | % | ±% |
|---|---|---|---|---|
| Labor | Ian McManus | 16,503 | 56.6 | −5.8 |
| Liberal | Pam Down | 12,652 | 43.4 | +11.7 |
| Total formal votes | | 29,155 | 96.4 | −1.0 |
| Informal votes | | 1,092 | 3.6 | +1.0 |
| Turnout | | 30,247 | 94.4 | |
| Labor notional hold | | Swing | −8.8 | |
