= Francis Stewart Boyce =

Australian politician

The Honourable Justice Francis Stewart Boyce KC

Justice of the Supreme Court of New South Wales
- In office 1932–unknown

Member of the Legislative Council of New South Wales
- In office 7 August 1923 – 17 June 1932

Attorney-General of New South Wales
- In office 18 October 1927 – 3 November 1930
- Preceded by: Andrew Lysaght, junior
- Succeeded by: Andrew Lysaght, junior

Vice-President of the Executive Council of New South Wales
- In office 18 October 1927 – 3 November 1930
- Preceded by: Albert Willis
- Succeeded by: Albert Willis

Personal details
- Born: 26 June 1872 Rockley, New South Wales
- Died: 27 June 1940 (aged 68) Pymble, Sydney, New South Wales
- Party: Nationalist Party of Australia
- Spouse(s): Norah, nee Glasson (m. 1901)
- Education: The King's School; Sydney Grammar School; Rugby School
- Alma mater: University of Sydney
- Occupation: Jurist; politician

Francis Stewart Boyce KC (26 June 1872 – 27 June 1940) was an Australian politician and judge.

He was born in Rockley to Francis Bertie Boyce and Caroline Stewart. He attended The King's School in Parramatta, Sydney Grammar School and then Rugby School in England, before studying at the University of Sydney. He qualified with a Bachelor of Arts in 1893 and a Bachelor of Law in 1896, being called to the bar the following year. In 1901 he married Norah Glasson, with whom he had five children. He was an acting judge on the District Court in 1916. In 1923 he was appointed to the New South Wales Legislative Council as a Nationalist. He took silk in 1924, the year in which he was appointed a minister without portfolio in the government. He held that position until 1925, and from 1927 to 1930 served as Attorney-General and Vice-President of the Executive Council. He resigned from the Council in 1932 to take up an appointment as a judge in divorce on the New South Wales Supreme Court. Boyce died at Pymble in 1940.

== Honours Received ==
Kings Counsel (KC) 1924
