= Lee Evans (Australian politician) =

Australian politician

Lee Evans MLA

Member of the New South Wales Legislative Assembly for Heathcote
- In office 26 March 2011 – 25 March 2023
- Preceded by: Paul McLeay
- Succeeded by: Maryanne Stuart

Personal details
- Born: 12 October 1961 (age 64)
- Party: Liberal

Lee Justin Evans (born 12 October 1961), an Australian politician. He was a member of the New South Wales Legislative Assembly representing Heathcote for the Liberal Party from 2011 until 2023.

Evans has lived in his constituency for more than 58 years. He has worked in the food industry and is part-owner of an Australian gourmet foods distribution business. He has also worked for a major food company as a distribution manager and a hospitality teacher at TAFE. He was endorsed as the Liberal candidate for Keira in the 2003 state election, however was unsuccessful in winning the seat from the incumbent Labor member, David Campbell. In 2006, Evans again received Liberal Party endorsement, this time for Heathcote, in the 2007 state election, but was unsuccessful in winning the seat from the incumbent Labor member, Paul McLeay despite receiving a swing of 3.5 points from McLeay on a two-party preferred basis. In 2010, the Liberal Party endorsed Evans, again for Heathcote running against McLeay. At the March 2011 elections, Evans was elected and received a swing of 14.8 points, winning 62.9 per cent of the two-party vote. He was defeated by Maryanne Stuart in 2023.

New South Wales Legislative Assembly
Preceded by Paul McLeay	Member for Heathcote; 2011–2023	Succeeded by Maryanne Stuart
