= John Sweeney (Australian politician) =

Australian politician

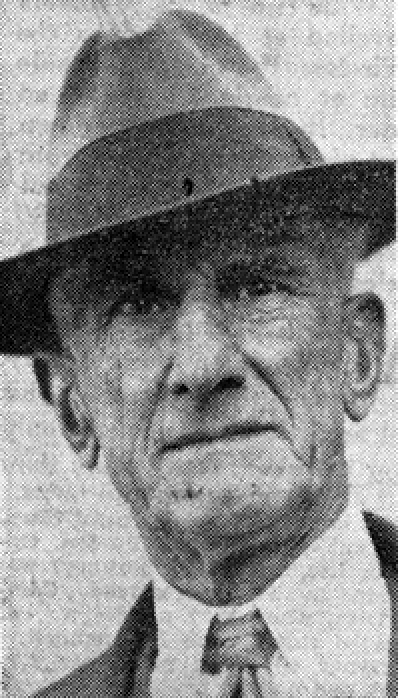

Member of the New South Wales Legislative Assembly for Bulli
- In office 3 June 1933 – 3 May 1947
- Preceded by: Andrew Lysaght
- Succeeded by: Laurie Kelly

Personal details
- Born: John Thomas Sweeney; 8 August 1863 Campbelltown, New South Wales, Australia
- Died: 2 September 1947 (aged 84) Russell Vale, New South Wales, Australia
- Party: Labor Party
- Spouse: Virginia Mary Grace Standen (m. 1893)
- Children: 7
- Occupation: politician

John Thomas Sweeney (8 August 1863 – 2 September 1947) was an Australian politician from New South Wales.

Born at Campbelltown to farmer Michael Sweeney and Mary Ann, née Rudd, he was a miner at Bulli. In 1893 he married Virginia Mary Grace Standen, with whom he had seven children. From 1916 to 1931 he was secretary of the Southern District Miners' Federation, and he served on the central executive of the Labor Party from 1923 to 1924.

He was elected to the New South Wales Legislative Assembly at the 1933 Bulli by-election, serving as the member for Bulli until his retirement in 1947.

Sweeney died on 2 September 1947 (aged 84) at Russell Vale and was buried at Bulli.

New South Wales Legislative Assembly
Preceded by Andrew Lysaght	Member for Bulli; 1933–1947	Succeeded by Laurie Kelly
