= Electoral district of Bulli =

State electoral district of New South Wales, Australia

Bulli was an electoral district of the Legislative Assembly in the Australian state of New South Wales in the Bulli area. It was originally created in 1930, replacing Wollongong. In 1971 it was abolished and was divided between the new electoral district of Heathcote and Corrimal. In 1991, Heathcote was abolished and Bulli was recreated. In 1999, Bulli was abolished and Heathcote was recreated.

== Members for Bulli ==
First incarnation (1930–1971)
Member	Party	Term
Andrew Lysaght	Labor	1930–1931
Andrew Lysaght	Labor (NSW)	1931-1933
John Sweeney	Labor (NSW)	1933–1936
John Sweeney	Labor	1936–1947
Laurie Kelly	Labor	1947–1955
Rex Jackson	Labor	1955–1971
Second incarnation (1991–1999)
Member	Party	Term
Ian McManus	Labor	1991–1999

== Election results ==
1995 New South Wales state election: Bulli
Party	Candidate	Votes	%	±%
Labor	Ian McManus	18,137	50.8	−1.4
Liberal	Roy Stanton	11,860	33.2	+2.2
Greens	Steve Allen	4,193	11.7	+4.0
Call to Australia	Nicole White	1,544	4.3	+0.9
Total formal votes		35,734	96.2	+2.2
Informal votes		1,421	3.8	−2.2
Turnout		37,155	94.8	
Two-party-preferred result
Labor	Ian McManus	21,006	61.3	−1.9
Liberal	Roy Stanton	13,263	38.7	+1.9
Labor hold		Swing	−1.9	
