= Electoral district of Heathcote =

Heathcote New South Wales—Legislative Assembly
- Interactive map of district boundaries from the 2023 state election
- State: New South Wales
- Dates current: 1971–1991; 1999–present
- MP: Maryanne Stuart
- Party: Labor
- Namesake: Heathcote, New South Wales
- Electors: 56,158 (2019)
- Area: 407.04 km^{2} (157.2 sq mi)
- Demographic: Outer-metropolitan
Electorates around Heathcote:
Holsworthy	Miranda	Miranda
Campbelltown	Heathcote	Cronulla
Wollondilly	Keira	Pacific Ocean

Heathcote is an electoral district of the Legislative Assembly in the Australian state of New South Wales. It was established in 1971, abolished in 1991 and re-established in 1999. Since 2023, it has been represented by Maryanne Stuart of the Labor Party.

== Members for Heathcote ==
First incarnation (1971–1991)
Member	Party	Term
Rex Jackson	Labor	1971–1986
Ian McManus	Labor	1987–1988
Allan Andrews	Liberal	1988–1991
Second incarnation (1999–present)
Ian McManus	Labor	1999–2003
Paul McLeay	Labor	2003–2011
Lee Evans	Liberal	2011–2023
Maryanne Stuart	Labor	2023–present

== Election results ==
2023 New South Wales state election: Heathcote
Party	Candidate	Votes	%	±%
Labor	Maryanne Stuart	23,301	44.2	+6.2
Liberal	Lee Evans	18,122	34.4	−8.0
Greens	Cooper Riach	6,571	12.5	−0.2
Shooters, Fishers, Farmers	Sean Ambrose (disendorsed)	1,926	3.7	+0.6
Animal Justice	Arielle Perkett	1,434	2.7	−0.2
Sustainable Australia	Matthew Bragg	1,369	2.6	+1.8
Total formal votes		52,723	97.6	+0.2
Informal votes		1,317	2.4	−0.2
Turnout		54,040	92.5	−0.1
Two-party-preferred result
Labor	Maryanne Stuart	29,050	59.9	+8.3
Liberal	Lee Evans	19,408	40.1	−8.3
Labor notional hold		Swing	+8.3	
