= Ian McManus =

Australian politician

Member of the New South Wales Parliament for Heathcote
- In office 1987–1988
- Preceded by: Rex Jackson
- Succeeded by: Allan Andrews

Member of the New South Wales Parliament for Burragorang
- In office 1988–1991

Member of the New South Wales Parliament for Bulli
- In office 1991–1999

Member of the New South Wales Parliament for Heathcote
- In office 1999–2003

Ian McManus (born 23 August 1945) is an Australian politician. He was a Labor Party member of the New South Wales Legislative Assembly from 1987 to 2003, representing the electorates of Heathcote (1987–88, 1999–2003), Burragorang (1988–1991) and Bulli (1991–99). He was a parliamentary secretary in the first two terms of the Carr Labor government.

McManus was born in Scotland, and his family migrated to Australia when he was a child. He attended Helensburgh Primary School, St Patrick's College in Sutherland and St George Technical College in Kogarah.

He worked as a junior postal officer after leaving school, before joining the Royal Australian Navy, where he served as a sonar operator from 1963 to 1971, serving in Borneo, the Malacca Straits and Vietnam. He won the United States Unit Commendation for his service during Operation Sea Dragon in the Gulf of Tonkin during the Vietnam War.

He left the Navy in 1971, and worked as a senior inspector with his local water board until his election to parliament. He was also an alderman with the City of Wollongong council and Illawarra County Council from 1977 until 1983.

McManus entered state politics in 1987 after winning Labor endorsement for a difficult by-election, sparked by the resignation of former Labor minister Rex Jackson amidst a serious corruption scandal which would later lead to Jackson's imprisonment. The race was made further difficult for Labor due to Jackson's surprise decision to run as an independent, but McManus survived a severe anti-Labor swing to take the seat ahead of Liberal candidate Allan Andrews.

After a hostile electoral redistribution, McManus shifted to the safer seat of Burragorang at the 1988 general election, where Andrews won Heathcote at his second attempt. McManus again shifted to the newly revived seat of Bulli at the 1991 election, and was re-elected in 1995 with the election of the Carr Labor government. McManus served as a parliamentary secretary in the first two terms of the Carr government, and retired in 2003. He has worked as a consultant since leaving politics.

New South Wales Legislative Assembly
Preceded by Rex Jackson	Member for Heathcote; 1987 – 1988	Succeeded by Allan Andrews
Preceded by New seat	Member for Burragorang; 1988 – 1991	Succeeded by Seat abolished
Preceded by New seat	Member for Bulli; 1991 – 1999	Succeeded by Seat abolished
Preceded by Seat revived	Member for Heathcote; 1999 – 2003	Succeeded by Paul McLeay
