= Laurie Kelly Sr. =

Australian politician

Laurie Kelly

Personal details
- Born: Lawrence Borthwick Kelly; 29 April 1883 Dumfries, Scotland
- Died: 5 May 1955 (aged 72) Bulli, New South Wales
- Party: Labor Party

Lawrence Borthwick Kelly (29 April 1883 – 5 May 1955) was an Australian politician and a member of the New South Wales Legislative Assembly from 1947 until his death. He was a member of the Labor Party (ALP).

Kelly was born in Dumfries, Scotland and was educated to elementary level. He worked from the age of 12 as a coal-miner. In 1911 he arrived in Australia and after initially working as a miner in the Hunter Region, found employment with the New South Wales Government Railways. He joined the Labor party and became an official with the Australian Railways Union. Kelly was a councillor on the Bulli Shire Council in 1927-32 and 1935–47.

He was the shire president in 1929-31 and 1945–47. Kelly was elected to the New South Wales Parliament as the Labor member for the seat of Bulli at the 1947 state election after the sitting Labor member John Sweeney retired.

He retained the seat for the Labor Party until 1955 when he died in office. He did not hold party, parliamentary or ministerial office. His son also, Laurie Kelly was the Speaker of the New South Wales Legislative Assembly in the 1980s.

Civic offices
Preceded by Alfred Herbert Fackender	Shire President of Bulli; 1929–1931	Succeeded by Arthur Frederick Morrison
Preceded by Con Quilkey	Shire President of Bulli; 1945–1947	Council abolished
New South Wales Legislative Assembly
Preceded by John Sweeney	Member for Bulli; 1947–1955	Succeeded by Rex Jackson
