= Albert Willis (Australian politician) =

Australian politician

Albert Charles Willis (24 May 1876 – 22 April 1954) was an Australian politician.

Born at Tonyrefail in Wales to sinker James Willis and Louisa Morse, he was educated at Bryn Mawr Board School and worked in the Monmouthshire mines from the age of ten. He was a bursary to London Labour College and Ruskin College, Oxford, and became first secretary of the Cardiff Workers Educational Association. Ordained a lay preacher with the Church of God in 1899, he was a member of Abertillery Urban District Council and Monmouthshire County Council. On 1 October 1901 he married Alice Maud Parker in London, with whom he had three children.

In 1911 he moved to New South Wales and worked at Balmain Colliery, becoming president and secretary of the Illawarra Colliery Employees' Association from 1913 to 1915. The first general secretary of the Australian Coal and Shale Employees' Federation from 1916 to 1925, he was arrested in 1917 as a member of the strike committee. From 1916 to 1919 he was a member of the Australian Labor Party's central executive, but he resigned in 1919 as part of the group that formed the Industrial Socialist Labor Party.

Willis rejoined the ALP in 1923 and became party president until 1925, when he was appointed to the New South Wales Legislative Council and became Vice-President of the Executive Council and Representative of Government in the Upper House. In 1927 he was Acting Secretary for Mines. He lost his portfolios with the defeat of the Lang government at the 1927 election, regaining them after the Lang victory at the 1930 election. In 1931 he was appointed Agent-General for New South Wales in London, serving until he was recalled following the dismissal of the Lang government and subsequent defeat at the 1932 election. He retained his appointment to the Legislative Council.

Willis resigned from the Legislative Council to stand as a Miners' candidate at the 1933 Bulli by-election, however he was defeated, receiving 23.5% of the primary votes, and was expelled from Lang Labor for standing against an endorsed candidate.

He was readmitted to the Federal Labor Party in February 1934, and was elected to the Federal Labor Executive in April 1934, holding that position until the dispute between federal and state labor was healed in 1936.

Willis died at Cronulla on 22 April 1954 (aged 77).

Parliament of New South Wales
Political offices
Preceded by Sir Joseph Carruthers	Vice-President of the Executive Council; 1925–1927	Succeeded by Francis Boyce
Preceded by Francis Boyce	Vice-President of the Executive Council; 1930–1931	Succeeded by James Concannon
New South Wales Legislative Council
Preceded by Sir Joseph Carruthers	Leader of the Government in the Legislative Council; 1925–1927	Succeeded by Francis Boyce
Preceded by Francis Boyce	Leader of the Government in the Legislative Council; 1930–1931	Succeeded by James Concannon
Diplomatic posts
Preceded by Francis Buckley	Agent-General for New South Wales; 1931–1932	In abeyance Title next held by Albert Edward Heath
