= Andrew Lysaght Jr. =

Politician and Attorney General from NSW, Australia (1873–1933)

The Honourable Andrew Lysaght
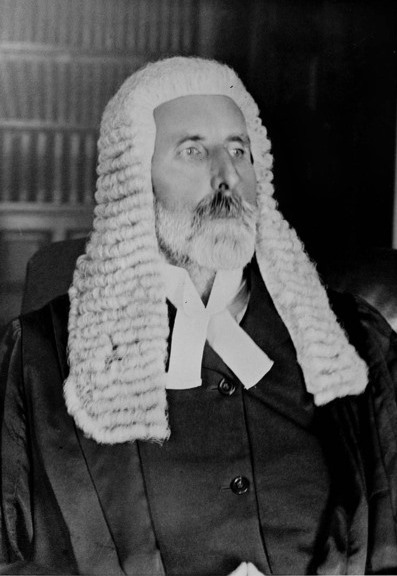

31st Attorney-General of New South Wales
- In office 27 May 1927 – 18 October 1927
- Premier: Jack Lang
- Preceded by: Edward McTiernan
- Succeeded by: Francis Boyce
- In office 4 November 1930 – 16 June 1931
- Premier: Jack Lang
- Preceded by: Francis Boyce
- Succeeded by: Joseph Lamaro

Personal details
- Born: 8 August 1873 Mount Ousley, Colony of New South Wales
- Died: 3 May 1933 (aged 59) Campbelltown, New South Wales, Australia
- Party: Labor Party
- Spouse: Margaret O'Dwyer
- Education: Newington College

Andrew Augustus Lysaght (8 August 1873 – 3 May 1933) was an Australian politician. He was a Labor Party member of the New South Wales Legislative Assembly from 1925 until 1933, representing the electorate of Bulli. He served as Attorney-General of New South Wales under Jack Lang in 1927 and 1930–31.

Lysaght was born at Mount Ousley near Wollongong, the son of politician Andrew Lysaght, senior. He was educated in Wollongong before attending Newington College (1888–1890) and the University of Sydney. He undertook articles in 1891, and was admitted as a solicitor in 1896. He established a reputation as a leading industrial lawyer, practicing in both Sydney and Wollongong. He was elected to the North Illawarra Municipal Council from 1900 to 1902, serving as mayor in 1902. It was at this time that his most prominent moment as a lawyer occurred, representing the miners before the Royal Commission into the Mount Kembla mining disaster. He continued to hold a successful legal career, and in 1923 was called to the bar.

Lysaght entered state politics in 1925, when he defeated incumbent Nationalist Mark Morton for the final seat in multi-member Wollondilly. He was briefly appointed Attorney-General in 1927, during the last months of the Lang government. In 1927, following the abolition of the multi-member system, he contested and won the recreated seat of Illawarra, defeating sitting MLA Brian Doe.

A redistribution of the region in 1930 saw him contest and win the new seat of Bulli, and Lang's return to power saw him again appointed Attorney-General, despite lacking support within the Labor caucus. He clashed heavily with ideological rivals within Labor, and slowly lost Lang's support; he had also become increasingly irascible, associated with his declining health as a result of a disease of the nervous system. He resigned from the ministry in 1931, and though he was re-elected in 1932, he suffered from continually worsening health.

He died at Campbelltown in 1933 while still in office, and was buried in the small town of Appin.

New South Wales Legislative Assembly
Preceded by Mark Morton	Member for Wollondilly; 1925–1927; With: Fuller, Davies	Succeeded by George Fuller
New district	Member for Illawarra; 1927–1930	Succeeded by Billy Davies
New district	Member for Bulli; 1930–1933	Succeeded by John Sweeney
Political offices
Preceded by Edward McTiernan	Attorney General of New South Wales; 1927	Succeeded by Francis Boyce
Preceded by William McKell	Minister for Justice; 1927	Succeeded by John Lee
Preceded by Francis Boyce	Attorney General of New South Wales; 1930–1931	Succeeded by Joseph Lamaro
