= Rex Jackson =

Australian politician

- Status: Released
- Motive: Gambling debts
- Conviction: Guilty
- Criminal charge: Conspiring over the release of prisoners
- Penalty: Ten years custody with a five years non-parole period (on appeal by The Crown to the Court of Criminal Appeal)

Rex Jackson

NSW Minister for Corrective Services
- In office 2 October 1981 – 27 October 1983
- Premier: Neville Wran
- Preceded by: Bill Haigh
- Succeeded by: Peter Anderson

NSW Minister for Roads
- In office 1 February 1983 – 27 October 1983
- Premier: Neville Wran
- Preceded by: Paul Whelan
- Succeeded by: Laurie Brereton

NSW Minister for Youth and Community Services
- In office 14 May 1976 – 2 October 1981
- Premier: Neville Wran
- Preceded by: Jim Clough
- Succeeded by: Kevin Stewart

Member of the New South Wales Legislative Assembly for Heathcote
- In office 13 February 1971 – 13 August 1986
- Preceded by: New seat
- Succeeded by: Ian McManus

Member of the New South Wales Legislative Assembly for Bulli
- In office 9 July 1955 – 13 February 1971
- Preceded by: Lawrence Kelly
- Succeeded by: Seat abolished

Personal details
- Born: 7 October 1928 Wagga Wagga, New South Wales, Australia
- Died: 31 December 2011 (aged 83) New South Wales
- Spouse: Irene Jackson

Rex Frederick Jackson (7 October 1928 – 31 December 2011) was an Australian politician, elected as a member of the New South Wales Legislative Assembly and subsequently imprisoned for conspiracy.

== Early life ==
Jackson was born in Wagga Wagga, New South Wales, the son of a railway fettler. He was educated at Harefield Public School and Junee, and Sutherland High Schools. He married his wife, Irene, in 1949.

== Career ==
Jackson was a rail employee, professional boxer and printer. He was the member for Bulli from 1955 to 1971, and the member for Heathcote from 1971 to 1986, representing the Labor Party. He was Minister for Youth and Community Services from May 1976 to October 1981. Under his tenure, the department began funding youth refuges located in NSW, including Caretakers Cottage, Young People's Refuge and Taldamunde Youth Services.

Jackson was then Minister for Corrective Services from October 1981 to October 1983. He was also Minister for Roads from February to October 1983. He resigned his ministerial portfolios on 27 October 1983 and from parliament on 13 August 1986. He was charged with corruption and sent to trial in 1987. The District Court found that Jackson accepted a bribe of A$12,000 in 1983 and that he conspired to organise the early release of three prisoners from Broken Hill Correctional Centre to meet gambling debts. He was initially sentenced to serve seven and a half years in custody (with three years without parole). However, in 1988 The Crown appealed to the Court of Criminal Appeal against the leniency of the sentence. Jackson was subsequently sent to prison for ten years, with a non-parole period of five years, serving time at Berrima Training Centre.

== Later years ==
Following his early release from prison in November 1990, after serving three years and two months of his 10-year term, he returned to his Helensburgh home and was welcomed back by many in his community.

For some years, Jackson operated an ice cream van with business partner Col Alexander, called "Col and Rex's Hot Dogs and Ice Cream" which regularly parked at the top of Bald Hill, a popular hang-gliding spot in Stanwell Tops, south of Sydney. Jackson's wife Irene suffered from arthritis and diabetes, and had a stroke just six weeks after his homecoming. She was hospitalised and then placed in a nursing home, dying in early 1993.

Jackson died on 31 December 2011, aged 83.

New South Wales Legislative Assembly
Preceded by Lawrence Kelly	Member for Bulli; 1955–1971	Succeeded by Seat abolished
Preceded by New seat	Member for Heathcote; 1971–1986	Succeeded by Ian McManus
