= The Grafton Argus and Clarence River General Advertiser =

The Grafton Argus and Clarence River General Advertiser, front page, 2 October 1874

The Grafton Argus and Clarence River General Advertiser, published under a variety of mastheads over the years, was published three times per week in the beginning. It then became a twice weekly publication but then in late 1920 or the beginning of 1921 it was published daily except Sundays. It was published in Grafton, on the far north coast of New South Wales, Australia, situated on the Clarence River.

== Newspaper history ==
The Grafton Argus and Clarence River General Advertiser was first published on Friday 2 October 1874, and was published every Monday, Wednesday and Friday morning. It continued under this masthead until the end of 1902. It was then published as The Grafton Argus, Clarence and Northern Rivers Advertiser until 17 December 1909. It was then shortened to The Grafton Argus until some time in 1920. By January 1921 it was known as the Grafton Daily Argus. It ceased publication in March 1922.

The founding proprietors were Thomas and Robert Page. Succeeding them as proprietors were "Messrs J. D. Gray and A. Gray, T. M. Shakespeare ... and the Messrs Puddicombe". Prior to starting the Grafton Argus, Robert Page had "gained journalistic experience in the office of the Examiner".

== Digitisation ==
This paper has been digitised as part of the Australian Newspapers Digitisation Program of the National Library of Australia.

== See also ==
- List of newspapers in Australia
- List of newspapers in New South Wales
