= Results of the 1999 New South Wales Legislative Council election =

Legislative Council election for New South Wales, Australia in March 1999

Party	Votes	%	+/–	Seats			
Party	Votes	%	+/–	Seats Won	Not Up	Total Seats	Seat Change
Labor	1,325,819	37.27	▲2.02	8	8	16	▼1
Liberal/National Coalition	974,352	27.39	▼11.02	6	8	14	▼4
One Nation	225,668	6.34	New	1	0	1	New
Democrats	142,768	4.01	▲0.80	1	1	2	Steady
Christian Democrats	112,699	3.17	▲0.16	1	1	2	Steady
Greens	103,463	2.91	▼0.84	1	1	2	▲1
Shooters	59,295	1.67	▼1.17	0	1	1	Steady
Progressive Labour	56,037	1.58	New	0	0	0	New
Marijuana Smokers Rights	43,991	1.24	New	0	0	0	New
Legal System Reform	35,712	1.00	New	1	0	1	New
Unity	34,785	0.98	New	1	0	1	New
Country Summit Alliance	31,771	0.89	New	0	0	0	New
Registered Clubs Party	27,564	0.77	New	0	0	0	New
Gun Owners & Sporting Hunters	25,106	0.71	New	0	0	0	New
Country NSW Party	19,819	0.56	▼0.04	0	0	0	Steady
What's Doing?	18,318	0.51	New	0	0	0	New
ABFFOC	15,800	0.44	▼0.84	0	1	1	Steady
Outdoor Recreation	7,264	0.20	New	1	0	1	New
Others	297,530	8.36	*	0	0	0	Steady
Total	3,557,761	100.00	–	21	21	42	–
Valid votes	3,557,761	92.83					
Invalid/blank votes	274,594	7.17	▲1.06				
Total votes	3,832,355	100.00	–				
Registered voters/turnout	4,115,059	93.13	▼0.67				

This election was known derogatively as the "Tablecloth Election", due to the unprecedented number of candidates contesting the Upper House, totalling 264 candidates for 81 parties. This meant that each of the 4 million ballot papers issued measured approximately 70x100cm, the size of a small tablecloth. A number of party names on the ballot were noted by election analyst Antony Green to be "clearly misleading in intent", such as the Gay and Lesbian Party, founded by heterosexual campaigners advocating for four-wheel drive access to the state's national parks.

The rules for nominating candidates to the Legislative Council were tightened to prevent this from happening again, as well as the abolition of group ticket preferences in response to Malcolm Jones of the Outdoor Recreation Party being elected with 0.2% of the vote. This is a list of results for the Legislative Council at the 1999 New South Wales state election.

A record 264 candidates ran in this election. Even more would run in each succeeding election.

== Results ==
1999 New South Wales state election: Legislative Council
Party	Candidate	Votes	%	±%
Quota		161,717		
Labor	1. Jeff Shaw (elected 1); 2. John Della Bosca (elected 4); 3. Eddie Obeid (elected 6); 4. Jan Burnswoods (elected 8); 5. Ian Macdonald (elected 10); 6. John Hatzistergos (elected 12); 7. Meredith Burgmann (elected 14); 8. Henry Tsang (elected 15); 9. Amanda Fazio; 10. Christine Robertson; 11. Glenys Plowman; 12. Tony Catanzariti; 13. Naomi Steer; 14. Katherine Brassil; 15. Julie Hatcher	1,325,819	37.27	+2.02
Liberal/National Coalition	1. Patricia Forsythe (elected 2); 2. Jenny Gardiner (elected 5); 3. John Ryan (elected 7); 4. Charlie Lynn (elected 9); 5. Doug Moppett (elected 11); 6. Don Harwin (elected 13); 7. Greg Hansen; 8. Catherine Cusack; 9. Greg Pearce; 10. Cathy Cleary; 11. Tony Dennison; 12. Juliet Arkwright; 13. John Worthington; 14. Toby Smith	974,352	27.39	−11.10
One Nation	1. David Oldfield (elected 3); 2. Brian Burston; 3. Jason Ross; 4. Carol Deeney; 5. Mark Booth	225,668	6.34	+6.34
Democrats	1. Arthur Chesterfield-Evans (elected 17); 2. Amelia Gavagnin Newman; 3. Matthew Baird; 4. Simon Disney; 5. Betty Endean; 6. Pam Clifford; 7. Aysha Pollnitz; 8. Ruth Harcourt-Norton; 9. Sonia Cousins	142,768	4.01	+0.80
Christian Democrats	1. Fred Nile (elected 21); 2. Peter Walker; 3. Graham McLennan; 4. Alasdair Webster; 5. Kevin Hume	112,699	3.17	+0.16
Greens	1. Lee Rhiannon (elected 18); 2. Karla Sperling; 3. Susie Russell; 4. Cathy Burgess; 5. Ben Oquist; 6. Leeza Dobbie; 7. Keelah Lam; 8. Paul Fitzgerald; 9. Kathleen Isherwood	103,463	2.91	−0.84
Shooters	1. Jim Pirie; 2. Rodney Franich; 3. Suzanne O'Connell; 4. Robyn Bourke; 5. Grahame Berry; 6. Peter Nikesitch; 7. Greg Ostini; 8. Colin Whelan; 9. Craig White; 10. Arthur Baker; 11. Don Stewart	59,295	1.67	−1.17
Progressive Labour	1. Klaas Woldring; 2. Jacklyn Clarke	56,037	1.58	+1.58
Marijuana Smokers Rights	1. Jeremy Matthew; 2. Jamie Smith	43,991	1.24	+1.24
Legal System Reform	1. Peter Breen (elected 20); 2. Vere Drakeford	35,712	1.00	+1.00
Unity	1. Peter Wong (elected 19); 2. Sarah Kemp; 3. Alan Jacobs; 4. Ramona Valenza	34,785	0.98	+0.98
Country Summit Alliance	1. John Wearne; 2. Ros Brennan; 3. Andrew Hegedus; 4. Claire Braund; 5. Janet Hayes; 6. John Marsh; 7. Robert Harris; 8. Peter Botfield; 9. David Kelly	31,771	0.89	+0.89
Registered Clubs Party	1. David Costello; 2. Stephen Cowan; 3. Joanna Lockwood; 4. Alan Langford; 5. Allan Peter; 6. Steve Parker	27,564	0.77	+0.77
Gun Owners & Sporting Hunters	1. Phillip Downey; 2. Con Koulouris	25,106	0.71	+0.71
The Country	1. Stephen Hedges; 2. Kylie Hedges	19,819	0.56	−0.04
What's Doing?	1. Mario Fenech; 2. Jacquie Prosser	18,318	0.51	+0.51
ABFFOC	1. Karen Bridgman; 2. Erica Mackenzie	15,800	0.44	−0.84
Franca Arena Child Safety Alliance	1. Franca Arena; 2. Judith Lancaster; 3. Beverley Alexander-Fisher	13,788	0.39	+0.39
Three Day Weekend	1. Irene Henry; 2. Rubina Morgan	12,003	0.34	+0.34
Australian Family Alliance	1. Damien Tudehope; 2. Mary-Louise Fowler; 3. Marc Florio; 4. Colleen Keppie; 5. Denis Patterson	11,824	0.33	+0.33
Young Australians Caring	1. Kristy Delaney; 2. Daryn Graham	11,090	0.31	+0.31
AAFI	1. Edwin Woodger; 2. David Kitson	10,881	0.31	−1.34
Gay and Lesbian	1. Martin Blessing; 2. Ros Shaw	10,446	0.29	+0.29
Against Promotion of Homosexuality	1. Malcolm Andrews; 2. Dominic Toso	9,118	0.26	+0.26
Australian Small Business	1. Matthew Leigh-Jones; 2. Catherine Blasonato	8,998	0.25	+0.25
Animal Liberation	1. Donald Yorke-Goldney; 2. David Hopson	7,844	0.22	+0.22
Democratic Socialist	1. Dick Nichols; 2. Helen Jarvis	7,638	0.21	−0.04
Speranza	1. Tony Humphrey; 2. Kell Hutchence	7,637	0.21	+0.21
Four Wheel Drive	1. Bruce Thompson; 2. Frank Sanzari	7,547	0.21	+0.21
Outdoor Recreation	1. Malcolm Jones (elected 16); 2. Joanne Simox; 3. Ron Mathews	7,264	0.20	+0.20
Riders and Motorists	1. Phillip Foster; 2. Paul Taffa	7,027	0.20	+0.20
Drug Reform	1. Kevin Ryan; 2. Newton Gleeson	6,844	0.19	+0.19
Seniors	1. Mervyn Vessey; 2. Lesley Spencer	6,565	0.18	+0.18
Jobs for Everyone	1. Peter Thorp; 2. Jane Keaton	6,522	0.18	+0.18
Marine Environment Conservation	1. Dave Thomas; 2. Sorel Jones	6,185	0.17	+0.17
Wilderness Party	1. Henry Bawden; 2. Colin Smith	6,097	0.17	+0.17
Stop Banks Exploiting Australians	1. Gary Burns; 2. Michael Davis	5,931	0.17	+0.17
Coalition for Political Integrity	1. Rodney Burton; 2. Graeme Cordiner	5,650	0.16	−1.54
Fair Tax	1. Jim Reid; 2. Mara Ashmore; 3. Andrew Coroneo; 4. Sam Spitzer	5,209	0.15	+0.15
Help Disabled People	1. David Bradley; 2. Donald Bilton	5,056	0.14	+0.14
Mick Gallagher for Australia	1. Patrick Gallagher; 2. John Mawson	5,008	0.14	+0.14
NSW Ratepayers	1. Ewan Tolhurst; 2. Brian Shaw	4,982	0.14	+0.14
Womens Party/Save the Forests	1. Rebecca Lambert; 2. David Hulbert; 3. Helen Scott; 4. Martina Hulbert	4,740	0.13	+0.13
Australia First	1. Jeffery Ritherdon; 2. Greg Willson	4,709	0.13	+0.13
Make Billionaires Pay More Tax	1. Kate Aitken Rasink; 2. Lucinda Barlow	4,672	0.13	+0.13
Euthanasia Referendum	1. Jane Heinrichs; 2. Gregory Piol	4,553	0.13	+0.13
Care For Us	1. Michael Gliksman; 2. Shane Nicholls	4,472	0.13	+0.13
People Before Party Politics	1. Godfrey Bigot; 2. Allan Jones	4,463	0.13	+0.13
Hospitals, Education, Law, Privacy	1. William McBride; 2. Mary-Rose Rooney	4,424	0.12	+0.12
Earthsave	1. Brandon Raynor; 2. Simon Spicer	4,070	0.11	+0.11
People Against Paedophiles	1. John Piechocki; 2. Graham Ireland	3,934	0.11	+0.11
Independent Community Network	1. Maire Sheehan; 2. Pam Arnold; 3. Helen Brown; 4. Michael Reymond	3,890	0.11	+0.11
Abolish State Governments	1. Peter Consandine; 2. Sharon Trompf; 3. John August	3,853	0.11	+0.11
A Fair Go for Families	1. Steven Wright; 2. Michael Uttley	3,650	0.10	+0.10
Communist	1. John Bailey; 2. Dorothy Bassil	3,391	0.10	+0.10
Voice of the People	1. Spencer Wu; 2. Ginette Farcell; 3. John Allen; 4. Chang Hu	3,260	0.09	+0.09
Citizens Electoral Council	1. Robert Butler; 2. Glenys Collins	3,227	0.09	+0.09
Natural Law	1. Tim Carr; 2. Sandy Price	3,212	0.09	−0.08
Give Criminals Longer Sentences	1. Geoff Beskin; 2. George Palasty	3,145	0.09	+0.09
Responsible Drug Reform	1. Simon Heath; 2. Michael Cole	3,138	0.09	+0.09
Republic 2001/People First	1. Glenn Druery; 2. Claire Simmonds; 3. Christopher Scrogie; 4. Patricia Hales; 5. Bridget Mahoney; 6. Glen McClure; 7. Robert Minale; 8. Paride Bucciarelli; 9. Marea Papandrea; 10. Clive Simonds; 11. Kylie Salmon; 12. Linda Lawson; 13. Nick Di Pietro; 14. Susan Murphy; 15. Antonio Gabrielle	3,076	0.09	+0.09
Outside Newcastle Sydney Wollongong	1. Andrew McPherson; 2. Sally McPherson	2,927	0.08	+0.08
Responsible Gambling	1. Marea Le Rade; 2. Jim Hickson	2,906	0.08	+0.08
No Nuclear Waste Dumps	1. Gordon Crisp; 2. Terry Corcoran	2,552	0.07	+0.07
Motor Vehicle Consumer Protection	1. Anthony Galati; 2. Diane Stace	2,209	0.06	+0.06
No Privatisation People's Party	1. Samir Bargashoun; 2. Nuha Sangari	2,084	0.06	+0.06
No Badgerys Creek Airport	1. Brad Outzen; 2. Julie Outzen	2,002	0.06	+0.06
Group AG	1. June Esposito; 2. Margaret-Anne Hutton	1,984	0.06	+0.06
Anti-Corruption	1. Tony Allen; 2. Graham Jacups	1,865	0.05	+0.05
Non-Custodial Parents	1. Andrew Thompson; 2. Angela Flynn	1,825	0.05	+0.05
Elect the President	1. Sidonie Carpenter; 2. Ian Carpenter	1,720	0.05	+0.05
Australians for a Better Community	1. Adam Todd; 2. Suzanne Brook	1,679	0.05	+0.05
Reclaim Australia	1. Rod Smith; 2. Noel Clarke	1,510	0.04	+0.04
Our Common Future	1. Helen Caldicott; 2. Jennie Stewart; 3. Genevieve Rankin	1,465	0.04	+0.04
Group BC	1. Joseph Kanan; 2. Victor Shen	1,235	0.03	+0.03
Hotel Patrons	1. Brett McHolme; 2. Dennis Robinson	1,188	0.03	+0.03
Reform Parliamentary Super	1. Peter Moran; 2. Sue Moran	1,108	0.03	+0.03
Community First	1. Michael Smith; 2. Maria-Elena Chidzey	1,027	0.03	+0.03
Timbarra Clean Water	1. Robert Corowa; 2. Natalie Stevens	871	0.02	+0.02
Tenants Have Rights	1. Kylie Kilgour; 2. Cecil See	804	0.02	+0.02
Independent	Bob Miller	238	0.01	+0.01
Independent	Ivor F	205	0.01	+0.01
Independent	Chris Lang	181	0.01	+0.01
Independent	Mark Dixen	102	0.01	+0.01
Independent	Michael Wright	44	0.01	+0.01
Independent	Eddy Watson	31	0.01	+0.01
Total formal votes		3,557,762	92.83	−1.06
Informal votes		274,594	7.17	+1.06
Turnout		3,832,356	93.13	−0.67

== Continuing members ==
The following MLCs were not up for re-election this year.

Member	Party	Term
Ron Dyer	Labor	1995–2003
Michael Egan	Labor	1995–2003
Johno Johnson	Labor	1995–2001
Tony Kelly	Labor	1997–2003
Andy Manson	Labor	1995–2003
Peter Primrose	Labor	1996–2003
Janelle Saffin	Labor	1995–2003
Carmel Tebbutt	Labor	1998–2003
John Hannaford	Liberal	1995–2000
Mike Gallacher	Liberal	1996–2003
John Jobling	Liberal	1995–2003
Brian Pezzutti	Liberal	1995–2003
Jim Samios	Liberal	1995–2003
Duncan Gay	National	1995–2003
Richard Bull	National	1995–2000
Richard Jones (Note: Richard Jones was elected as a Democrat at the previous election, but left the party in 1996 and served the rest of his term as an independent.)	Independent	1995–2003
Helen Sham-Ho (Note: Helen Sham-Ho had been elected as a Liberal, but resigned from the party on 29 June 1998. She served out the remainder of her term as an independent.)	Independent	1995–2003
Elaine Nile	Christian Democrats	1995–2002
Ian Cohen	Greens	1995–2003
John Tingle	Shooters	1995–2003
Alan Corbett	ABFFOC	1995–2003

== See also ==
- Results of the 1999 New South Wales state election (Legislative Assembly)
- Candidates of the 1999 New South Wales state election
- Members of the New South Wales Legislative Council, 1999–2003
