= Candidates of the 1999 New South Wales state election =

This article provides information on candidates who stood for the 1999 New South Wales state election. The election was held on 27 March 1999.

== Retiring Members ==
=== Labor ===
- Bill Beckroge MLA (Broken Hill)
- Mick Clough MLA (Bathurst)
- Bob Harrison MLA (Kiama)
- Brian Langton MLA (Kogarah)
- Bob Martin MLA (Port Stephens)
- Stan Neilly MLA (Cessnock)
- Pat Rogan MLA (East Hills)
- Terry Rumble MLA (Illawarra)
- Doug Shedden MLA (Bankstown)
- Gerry Sullivan MLA (Wollongong)
- Dorothy Isaksen MLC
- Jim Kaldis MLC
- Bryan Vaughan MLC

=== Liberal ===
- Jeremy Kinross MLA (Gordon) – seat abolished, failed to win preselection for the Legislative Council
- Joe Schipp MLA (Wagga Wagga)
- Virginia Chadwick MLC
- Marlene Goldsmith MLC
- Max Willis MLC

=== National ===
- Peter Cochran MLA (Monaro)
- Adrian Cruickshank MLA (Murrumbidgee)
- Bruce Jeffery MLA (Oxley)
- Gerry Peacocke MLA (Dubbo)
- Bill Rixon MLA (Lismore)
- Jim Small MLA (Murray)
- Bob Smith MLC

=== Other ===
- Peter Macdonald MLA (Manly) – Independent

== Legislative Assembly ==
Sitting members at the time of the election are shown in bold text. Successful candidates are highlighted in the relevant colour. Where there is possible confusion, an asterisk (*) is also used.

Electorate	Held by	Labor candidate	Coalition candidate	Greens candidate	One Nation candidate	Democrats candidate	Other candidates
Albury	Liberal	Mike O'Donnell	**Ian Glachan** (Lib)		Michael Smith		Claire Douglas (Ind)
Auburn	Labor	**Peter Nagle**	Bulent Borluk (Lib)	Geoff Ash	Kane O'Connor	Colin McDermott	Shane Bentley (DSL); Chris Johnson (AAFI); Fatia Yakup (Unity)
Ballina	National	Sue Dakin	**Don Page** (Nat)	Chris Flower		Lorraine Robertson	Sue Arnold (TCW); Philip Gosper (CDP); John MacGregor (Ind); Elise Ward (ES)
Bankstown	Labor	**Tony Stewart**	Paul Barrett (Lib)	Kate Walsh	Barry Ashe	Kate Botting	John Bastin (AAFI); Kylie Laurence (CDP); Erick Meguid (Unity); Richard Phillips (SEP)
Barwon	National	Meryl Dillon	**Ian Slack-Smith** (Nat)		Bob Johns	Ken Graham	Albert Cooke (CEC)
Bathurst	Labor	Gerard Martin	David Berry (Lib); Stan Wilson (Nat)	Leonie Williams	Warren Rowe	Cecil Grivas	Millman Ashton (AAFI); Michael Bray (Ind); Rod Gurney (ORP); Joe McGinnes (Ind); David Simpson (CEC); Robert Thompson (NCPP)
Baulkham Hills	Liberal	Tony Hay	**Wayne Merton** (Lib)	Chris Harris	Lothar Schultejohann	Margaret Ferrara	Margaret King (AAFI); David Marshall (NCPP); Matthew Wong (Unity)
Bega	Liberal	John Boland	**Russell Smith** (Lib)	Kathy Freihaut	Robin Innes	Denise Redmond	Robert Paris (Ind)
Blacktown	Labor	**Paul Gibson**	Rick Holder (Lib)		Bill Nixon	David King	Bob Bawden (CDP); Ed Sherwood (AAFI)
Bligh	Independent	Vic Smith	Peter Fussell (Lib)	Emelia Holdaway			Malcolm Duncan (Ind); Bronia Hatfield (NLP); Ariel Marguin (Unity); **Clover Moore*** (Ind); Julia Trubridge (ERP); Change Upton (TCW)
Blue Mountains	Labor	**Bob Debus**	Jennifer Scott (Lib)	Adele Doust	Wayne Buckley	Stephen Lear	Margaret Anderson (AAFI); Catherine Bell (ES); Shirley Grigg (CDP)
Burrinjuck	Liberal	Michael McManus	Katrina Hodgkinson* (Nat); Gloria Schultz (Lib)	Jan Green	Don Tarlinton	Peter Fraser	Lindasy Cosgrove (CEC); Zophia Newborne (CDP)
Cabramatta	Labor	**Reba Meagher**	Glenn Watson (Lib)	Lee Grant	Peter Cornish	Matthew Hua	Ken Chapman (Ind); Michael Kremec (AAFI); Markus Lambert (Ind); Jodi Luke (CDP); Andrew Su (Unity)
Camden	Liberal	Alex Sanchez	**Liz Kernohan** (Lib)	Allen Powell	Oscar Rosso		Max Brazenall (AAFI); Greg Frawley (Ind); Jason Thompson (NCPP)
Campbelltown	Labor	**Michael Knight**	Paul Hawker (Lib)	Vicki Kearney	Christine Dawson	Dean Dudley	Jeffrey Churchill (NCPP); Ron Franks (AAFI); Sharynne Freeman (Ind); Chandra Singh (Unity)
Canterbury	Labor	**Kevin Moss**	Natalie Baini (Lib)	William Smith	Khiloud Shakir	Garry Dalrymple	John Koutsouras (Ind); Joshua Nam (Ind); Michael Robinson (CDP); Phillip Tzavellas (Ind); Gerard Vanderwel (AAFI); Guang-Hua Wan (Unity)
Cessnock	Labor	Kerry Hickey	Mark Coure (Lib)	James Ryan	Graham Burston		Ian Olsen (Ind)
Charlestown	Labor	**Richard Face**	Peter Craig (Lib)	Lynden Jacobi	Malcolm Sinclair		Jenny Boswell (CDP); James Hunt (Ind)
Clarence	Labor	**Harry Woods**	Steve Cansdell (Nat); Bill Day (Lib)	Karen Rooke	Marie Mathew	Alec York	Doug Behn (Ind); Mark McMurtrie (Ind); Jeff Milner (ES); Rebecca Tiffen (TCW)
Coffs Harbour	National	Alph Williams	**Andrew Fraser** (Nat)	Chris Cairns	George Gardiner	Mark Spencer	Frederick Ansted (AAFI); Chris Backman (ES); Evalds Erglis (Ind); Horst Sommer (NCPP)
Coogee	Labor	**Ernie Page**	Kevin Junee (Lib)	Murray Matson	Darrel Mullins	Harry Crow	Les Black (AAFI)
Cronulla	Liberal	Scott Docherty	**Malcolm Kerr** (Lib)	Cathy Power	Jack Manasserian	Roy Day	Warren Feinbier (AAFI); Patricia Poulos (Ind); Malcolm Smith (CDP)
Davidson	Liberal	Peter Lawson	**Andrew Humpherson** (Lib)	Peter Tuor	Aubrey Golden	Scott Henderson	Kieran Ginges (Unity); Margaret Ratcliffe (CDP); Ian Weatherlake (AAFI)
Drummoyne	Labor	**John Murray**	Peter Phelps (Lib)	Therese Doyle	John Ferguson	Cameron Andrews	Stephen Lesslie (Ind); Tony Mavin (AAFI); Jennifer Paull (Ind)
Dubbo	National	Warren Mundine	Richard Mutton (Nat)	Cara Phillips	John Neville	Chris Dunkerley	Peter Keough (Ind); Tony McGrane* (Ind)
East Hills	Labor	Alan Ashton	Nick Korovin (Lib)	Colin Charlton	Kay Bounds	Jeff Meikle	Dean Carver (Ind); Marie Coppolaro (ES); John Moffat (AAFI); Max Parker (Ind)
Epping	Liberal	Steve Gurney	**Andrew Tink** (Lib)	Jamie Parker	Harry Ball	Rachael Jacobs	Peter Bell (AAFI); Owen Nannelli (CDP); Sung Yoo (Unity)
Fairfield	Labor	**Joe Tripodi**	Andrew Rohan (Lib)	Rodrigo Gutierrez	Bob Vinnicombe	David Hua	Bob Aiken (Ind); John Carey (AAFI); Linda Cogger (NLP); George Haroon (CDP); Samuel Mackenzie (NCPP); Thang Ngo (Unity)
Georges River	Liberal	Kevin Greene	**Marie Ficarra** (Lib)	John Kaye	Andy Konnecke		Deirdrei Bedwell (Ind); Paul Celik (Unity); Brian McFarlane (AAFI); Annie Tang (Ind)
Gosford	Liberal	Barry Cohen	**Chris Hartcher** (Lib)	Joanna Weckert	Errol Baker	Andrew Penfold	Gary Bailey (CDP); Isabel Gelling (AAFI); Tom McKenna (Ind); Anna Parker (ES)
Granville	Labor	**Kim Yeadon**	Tony Issa (Lib)	Melanie Gillbank	Shane O'Connor		David Wadsworth (AAFI)
Hawkesbury	Liberal	Meagan Lawson	**Kevin Rozzoli** (Lib)	Jocelyn Howden	Noeline Saxiones	Arthur Rutter	David Belling (Ind); Ian Bruggemann (NCPP); Geoffrey Dakin (AAFI); Les Sheather (Ind)
Heathcote	Labor	**Ian McManus**	**Lorna Stone** (Lib)	Jo-Anne Lentern	Reg Lowder	David Holloway	Jim Bowen (CDP); Zero Hughes (AAFI); Brett McLoughlin (ORP); Wai Tsui (Unity)
Heffron	Labor	**Deirdre Grusovin**	Jackie Canessa (Lib)	Jonathan Keyte	David Taylor	David Mendelssohn	Rex Dobson (AAFI); Jim Green (DSL)
Hornsby	Liberal	Scott Cardamatis	**Stephen O'Doherty** (Lib)	Steve Douglas	Peter Jansson	Alicia Swallow	Mick Gallagher (Ind); Russell Howe (Ind); Chris Meany (Ind); David Mudgee (AAFI); Xiaogang Zhang (Unity)
Illawarra	Labor	Marianne Saliba	Kosta Jordan (Lib)	Jane Anderson	Ivan Prsa	Penny Bartholomew	Stephen Blayney (NCPP); Francis Green (AAFI); Brian Hughes (CDP); Roger Mason (Ind); Margaret Perrott (DSL)
Keira	Labor	David Campbell	Alan Akhurst (Lib)		John Curtis		Louise Gozzard (ES); William Hamilton (AAFI); Dave Martin (Ind); Richard Nederkoorn (Ind); Robert O'Neill (CDP)
Kiama	Labor	Matt Brown	Charlie Mifsud (Lib)	Jim Bradley	Dan Orr	Henry Collier	John Kadwell (CDP); Philip McLeod (Ind); John Murray (AAFI)
Kogarah	Labor	Cherie Burton	Sam Witheridge (Lib)	Dominic Kanak	Neil Baird		Polly Chan (Ind); Les Crompton (Ind); Mark Ison (CDP); Nathan Jones (ORP); Alexander Peniazov (NCPP); Ilia Uzonoski (Unity); John Whalen (AAFI)
Ku-ring-gai	Liberal	Jan Butland	**Barry O'Farrell** (Lib)	Andrew Burke	Robert Webeck	Neil Halliday	Matthew Ayres (CDP); Mick Chehoff (AAFI); John Ryder (NLP)
Lachlan	National	Tony Lord	**Ian Armstrong** (Nat)	Mike Durrant	Wilf Reid	Peter Mulligan	
Lake Macquarie	Labor	**Jeff Hunter**	Don Payne (Lib)	David Blyth	Robert Johnson		Bob Boulton (AAFI); Ros Gourlay (CDP)
Lakemba	Labor	**Morris Iemma**	Michael Hawatt (Lib)		Hussein Abou-Ghaida	Richard Newman	Barbara Coorey (Ind); Tom Moody (AAFI)
Lane Cove	Liberal	Brad Powe	**Kerry Chikarovski** (Lib)	Suzy Orme	Joanne May	David Harcourt-Norton	Bernd Rindermann (AAFI)
Lismore	National	Kevin Bell	Thomas George* (Nat); John Howard (Lib)	John Corkill		Matthew Walsh	Judy Canales (Ind); Ray Dhu (CDP); Ray Thorpe (ES); Matthew Ward (TCW); Bernie Wunsch (DSL)
Liverpool	Labor	**Paul Lynch**	David Barker (Lib)		Rod Smith		John Coleman (AAFI); Ricky Costa (Unity); Steve Henshaw (CEC); Eric Sanders (NCPP)
Londonderry	Labor	**Jim Anderson**	Kevin Conolly (Lib)	Ross Kingsley	Stephen Burke	Jim Cassidy	Dion Bailey (Ind); Lachlan Gelling (AAFI); Allan Holmes (NCPP); John Phillips (CDP)
Macquarie Fields	Labor	**Craig Knowles**	Jai Rowell (Lib)		Stuart Horton	Emanuela Lang	Mick Allen (Ind); Jane Field (AAFI); Scott Thompson (NCPP)
Maitland	Liberal	**John Price**	**Peter Blackmore** (Lib)	Jan Davis	Phillip Harper	James Lantry	Paul Kerslake (CDP); Ann Lawler (CEC); Bob Taylor (ORP)
Manly	Independent	David de Montford	Darren Jones (Lib)	Judy Lambert	Christine Ferguson	Antony Howells	David Barr* (Ind); Peter Ecroyd (AAFI); Peter Stitt (ORP); Chris Wong (Unity)
Maroubra	Labor	**Bob Carr**	Tio Faulkner (Lib)	Jules Bastable	Jack McEwen	Paul Corben	Nagaty Hassan (Unity); Cecilia Paton (AAFI)
Marrickville	Labor	**Andrew Refshauge**	Jonathan Morris (Lib)	Sean Roberts	Jill Brown	Peter Kenyon	Tuntuni Bhattacharyya (DSL); Christopher Hallett (CDP); Ann Overend (ERP); Morris Tadros (Ind); Gordon The (Unity)
Menai	Liberal	Alison Megarrity	Brett Thomas (Lib)	Jim McGoldrick	Dorothy Hutton	Anthony Mayne	Bob May (Ind); Robert Wardle (AAFI)
Miranda	Liberal	Barry Collier	**Ron Phillips** (Lib)	Kerry Nettle	Max Remy	Syd Hickman	Keith Eastwood (AAFI)
Monaro	National	John Durst	Ian Marjason (Lib); Peter Webb* (Nat)	Catherine Moore	Matthew Swift		Frank Fragiacomo (Ind); Earle Keegle (Ind); Frank Pangallo (Ind)
Mount Druitt	Labor	**Richard Amery**	Allan Green (Lib)	Bob Nolan	Nev Williams	Peter Reddy	Robert Girvan (AAFI); Leila Toal (Unity); Joseph Wyness (CDP)
Mulgoa	Labor	**Diane Beamer**	Christine Bourne (Lib)	Peter Grant	Rick Putra	Andrew Owen	James Carey (AAFI); Simon Hedges (R2P); Val Horton (GOSHR); Brent Lawson (PF); Leah Matthews (ORP); Al Mewett (NBCA); Ian Owens (NCPP)
Murray-Darling	National	Peter Black	Mark Kersten (Nat)		Don McKinnon	Dave Burton	Alan Boyd (CEC); John White (NCPP)
Murrumbidgee	National	Patrick Pittavino	Adrian Piccoli (Nat)		Les Mulloy	Sylvia Ramsay	Lee Stroobants (CEC)
Myall Lakes	National	Mike Tuffy	**John Turner** (Nat)	Linda Gill	Jason Deeney		Ken Spragg (AAFI)
Newcastle	Labor	**Bryce Gaudry**	David Williams (Lib)	Ian McKenzie	Sharyn Brooks	Stephen Bisgrove	Chris Brookman (Unity); Dennis Chaston (CEC); Terry Cook (SEP); Harry Criticos (Ind); Geoff Payne (DSL)
Northern Tablelands	National	Martin Lawrence	**Ray Chappell** (Nat)	Pat Schultz	John Webeck	Merran Cooper	Noel Keogh (Ind); Richard Torbay* (Ind)
North Shore	Liberal	Janet McDonald	**Jillian Skinner** (Lib)	David Bell	David Kelly	Brenda Padgett	Lindon Dedman (AAFI)
Orange	National	Glenn Taylor	**Russell Turner** (Nat)	Ian Watts	Terry Nixon	Andrew McKenzie	Dave Cox (Ind); Michael McLennan (CDP)
Oxley	National	Jacquie Argent	Andrew Stoner (Nat)	Sally Cavanagh	John Willey	Brigitte Williams	Betty Green (Ind); Tom Henderson (Ind); Paul Parkinson (Ind)
Parramatta	Labor	**Gabrielle Harrison**	Moira Copping (Lib)	Peter Wright	Terry Cooksley	Peter Byrne	Lindsay Butler (AAFI); John Cogger (NLP); Rodney McCarthy (Unity); Michael McMahon (NCPP); Kylie Moon (DSL)
Peats	Labor	**Marie Andrews**	Debra Wales (Lib)	Stephen Lacey	Jeffrey Prest	Geoff Preece	Xiong Guo (Unity); Ian King (AAFI); Norm Purcival (ES); Sue Spencer (CDP)
Penrith	Labor	**Faye Lo Po'**	Ross Fowler (Lib)	Lesley Edwards	Jean Eykamp	Richard Villa	Wendy Broderick (Ind); Brian Grigg (CDP); Steve Grim-Reaper (Ind); Victoria Harris-Ball (Ind); Norman Hooper (Ind); David Morris (AAFI); Maureen Rogers (ES); Judith Thompson (NCPP)
Pittwater	Liberal	Pat Boydell	**John Brogden** (Lib)	Trevor Ockenden	Peter Cuthbertson	Vicki Dimond	Rick Bristow (CDP); Adrian Sonza (ES); Peter Vlug (NCPP); Paul Whitmore (AAFI)
Port Jackson	Labor	**Sandra Nori**	Keri Huxley (Lib)	Jenny Ryde	Michael Vescio	Peter Furness	Josh Burvill (NLP); Marina Carman (DSL); Dennis Doherty (CPA); Ken Druery (PF); Jean Lennane (Ind); Robert Loschiavo (GOSHR); Jean-Marcel Malliate (NCPP)
Port Macquarie	National	Maureen Riordan	**Rob Oakeshott** (Nat)	Lorraine Andersons	Kim Sara		Norm Dachs (AAFI); Graeme Muldoon (CEC)
Port Stephens	Labor	John Bartlett	Geoff Robinson (Nat)	Glen Stevenson	Mark Conway	Felicity Boyd	Sally Dover (CDP); Tony King (CEC); Maxina McCann (Ind)
Riverstone	Labor	**John Aquilina**	Joan McIntyre (Lib)	Cedric Hawkins	Tony Pettitt	Thomas Peacock	John King (AAFI)
Rockdale	Labor	**George Thompson**	Phillip Kaloudis (Lib)	Nola Taylor	Michael Citton	Craig Chung	Pino Cardillo (NCPP); Ian Gelling (AAFI); Peter Johnson (Ind); Joanne Jones (Ind); Wiliam Ryan (Ind)
Ryde	Liberal	**John Watkins**	**Michael Photios** (Lib)	Jimmy Shaw	Gordon King	Noel Plumb	Ning Gao (Unity); Iris Knight (Ind); Jennifer Mathews (ORP); Fiona Paton (AAFI); Ivan Petch (Ind); Rod Salmon (PF)
Smithfield	Labor	**Carl Scully**	Bob Robertson (Lib)	Vlaudin Vega	Warren Dutton	Manny Poularas	Lewis Haroon (CDP); Earnest Nelson (AAFI)
South Coast	Liberal	Wayne Smith	**Eric Ellis** (Lib)	Jane Bange	Melinda Warn		Chris Bowen (AAFI); Steve Ryan (CDP)
Southern Highlands	Liberal	Noeline Brown	**Peta Seaton** (Lib)	Jim Clark	Trevor Clarke	Greg Butler	Philip Lavis (AAFI); Lynette Styles (Ind); Louise Taylor (NCPP)
Strathfield	Liberal	**Paul Whelan**	**Bruce MacCarthy** (Lib)	Mersina Soulos	Anthony Zeitoun	Anna Garrett	Chris Angel (ORP); Kwai Cheung (VOTP); John Divola (AAFI); Janne Peterson (CDP); Stephanie Roper (DSL); Omega Wu (Unity)
Swansea	Labor	Milton Orkopoulos	Jane Wiltshire (Lib)	Deb Gorgievski	Ronald Gardnir	Michelle Walls	Guy Wood (CDP)
Tamworth	Independent	Siobhan Barry	John Cox (Nat)		Daphney Mandel-Hayes		**Tony Windsor*** (Ind)
The Entrance	Labor	**Grant McBride**	Bob Graham (Nat); Philip Walker (Lib)	Rachel Alterator	John Cantwell	Sarah Browning	Garth Coulter (ORP); Garry Oates (AAFI); Karen Russell (CDP)
The Hills	Liberal	George Houssos	**Michael Richardson** (Lib)	Claudine Chung	Anthony Fitzpatrick	Helen McAuliffe	Shaar Baker (AAFI); Stephanie Chan (Unity); Ken Gregory (CDP)
Tweed	National	Neville Newell	**Don Beck** (Nat)	Tom Tabart		Troy Henderson	Tony Hollis (ES); John Penhaligon (Ind)
Upper Hunter	National	Chris Connor	**George Souris** (Nat)	Neil Strachan	Barrie Lawn		George Easey (CEC); Derrick Paxton (CDP)
Vaucluse	Liberal	David Patch	**Peter Debnam** (Lib)	Haete Weiner	Waverney Ford	Margaret Collings	Gregor Zylber (ERP)
Wagga Wagga	Liberal	Col McPherson	Jim Booth (Nat); Daryl Maguire* (Lib)		Greg Jerrick	Rex Graham	Leigh Campbell (Ind); Peter Dale (Ind)
Wakehurst	Liberal	Cherie Stokes	**Brad Hazzard** (Lib)	Barbara Hatten	Ian Nelson	Gabrielle Russell	Alexander Hampel (AAFI)
Wallsend	Labor	**John Mills**	Yvonne Piddington (Lib)	Rebecca Moroney	Colin Thompson		David Murray (CDP); Mel Schroeder (CEC)
Wentworthville	Labor	**Pam Allan**	Rachel Merton (Lib)	Rebecca Filipczyk	John Hutchinson	Geoffrey Rutledge	See-Yung Chin (Unity); Dee Jonsson (CDP); Ken O'Leary (AAFI)
Willoughby	Liberal	Luke Brasch	**Peter Collins** (Lib)	Bronwyn Brown	Heinz Markuse	Bryan McGuire	Jennifer Aukim (ES); Douglas McCallum (AAFI); Cheryl Wong (Unity)
Wollongong	Labor	**Col Markham**	Wade McInerney (Lib)	Garth Dickenson		Ken Russell	John James (AAFI); Phil Latz (CDP); Angela Luvera (DSL); Kit Yue (Unity)
Wyong	Labor	**Paul Crittenden**	Doug Lamb (Lib)		Ron Holten	David Mott	Carolyn Hastie (ES); Bev Hopkins (CDP); Maud Nelson (AAFI)

== Legislative Council ==
Sitting members at the time of the election are shown in bold text. Tickets that elected at least one MLC are highlighted in the relevant colour. Successful candidates are identified by an asterisk (*).

Labor candidates	Coalition candidates	Greens candidates	One Nation candidates	Democrats candidates
1. **Jeff Shaw***; 2. John Della Bosca*; 3. **Eddie Obeid***; 4. **Jan Burnswoods***; 5. **Ian Macdonald***; 6. John Hatzistergos*; 7. **Meredith Burgmann***; 8. Henry Tsang*; 9. Amanda Fazio; 10. Christine Robertson; 11. Glenys Plowman; 12. Tony Catanzariti; 13. Naomi Steer; 14. Katherine Brassil; 15. Julie Hatcher	1. **Patricia Forsythe*** (Lib); 2. **Jenny Gardiner*** (Nat); 3. **John Ryan*** (Lib); 4. **Charlie Lynn*** (Lib); 5. **Doug Moppett*** (Nat); 6. Don Harwin* (Lib); 7. Greg Hansen (Lib); 8. Catherine Cusack (Lib); 9. Greg Pearce (Lib); 10. Cathy Cleary (Nat); 11. Tony Dennison (Lib); 12. Juliet Arkwright (Lib); 13. John Worthington (Lib); 14. Toby Smith (Nat)	1. Lee Rhiannon*; 2. Karla Sperling; 3. Susie Russell; 4. Cathy Burgess; 5. Ben Oquist; 6. Leeza Dobbie; 7. Keelah Lam; 8. Paul Fitzgerald; 9. Kathleen Isherwood	1. David Oldfield*; 2. Brian Burston; 3. Jason Ross; 4. Carol Deeney; 5. Mark Booth	1. **Arthur Chesterfield-Evans***; 2. Amelia Gavagnin Newman; 3. Matthew Baird; 4. Simon Disney; 5. Betty Endean; 6. Pam Clifford; 7. Aysha Pollnitz; 8. Ruth Harcourt-Norton; 9. Sonia Cousins
CDP candidates	Unity candidates	RLS candidates	ORP candidates	Shooters candidates
1. **Fred Nile***; 2. Peter Walker; 3. Graham McLennan; 4. Alasdair Webster; 5. Kevin Hume	1. Peter Wong*; 2. Sam McGuid; 3. Sarah Kemp; 4. Alan Jacobs; 5. Ramona Valenza	1. Peter Breen*; 2. Vere Drakeford	1. Malcolm Jones*; 2. Joanne Simcox; 3. Ron Mathews	1. Jim Pirie; 2. Rodney Franich; 3. Suzanne O'Connell; 4. Robyn Bourke; 5. Grahame Berry; 6. Peter Nikesitch; 7. Greg Ostini; 8. Colin Whelan; 9. Craig White; 10. Arthur Baker; 11. Don Stewart
MRSP candidates	GLP candidates	YAC candidates	Ratepayers candidates	RCP candidates
1. Jeremy Matthew; 2. Jamie Smith	1. Martin Blessing; 2. Ros Shaw	1. Kristy Delaney; 2. Daryn Graham	1. Ewan Tolhurst; 2. Brian Shaw	1. David Costello; 2. Stephen Cowan; 3. Joanna Lockwood; 4. Alan Langford; 5. Allan Peter; 6. Steve Parker
RGP candidates	SBEA candidates	CEC candidates	GOSHR candidates	MECP candidates
1. Marea Le Rade; 2. Jim Hickson	1. Gary Burns; 2. Michael Davis	1. Robert Butler; 2. Glenys Collins	1. Philip Downey; 2. Con Koulouris	1. Dave Thomas; 2. Sorel Jones
Care For Us candidates	ABFFOC candidates	NLP candidates	PLP candidates	RMP candidates
1. Michael Gliksman; 2. Shane Nicholls	1. Karen Bridgman; 2. Erica Mackenzie	1. Tim Carr; 2. Sandy Price	1. Klaas Woldring; 2. Jacklyn Clarke	1. Phillip Foster; 2. Paul Taffa
JEFA candidates	Country candidates	ETP candidates	ASG candidates	Communist candidates
1. Peter Thorp; 2. Jane Keaton	1. Stephen Hedges; 2. Kylie Hedges	1. Sidonie Carpenter; 2. Ian Carpenter	1. Peter Consandine; 2. Sharon Trompf; 3. John August	1. John Bailey; 2. Dorothy Bassil
ONSWP candidates	MGA candidates	Anti-Corruption candidates	HDP candidates	Speranza candidates
1. Andrew McPherson; 2. Sally McPherson	1. Patrick Gallagher; 2. John Mawson	1. Tony Allen; 2. Graham Jacups	1. David Bradley; 2. Donald Bilton	1. Tony Humphrey; 2. Kell Hutchence; 3. Tony Woods
KRDF candidates	AFA candidates	AAPH candidates	Group AG candidates	RDRA candidates
1. Kevin Ryan; 2. Newton Gleeson	1. Damien Tudehope; 2. Mary-Louise Fowler; 3. Marc Florio; 4. Colleen Keppie; 5. Denis Patterson	1. Malcolm Andrews; 2. Dominic Toso	1. June Esposito; 2. Margaret-Anne Hutton	1. Simon Heath; 2. Michael Cole
RPF candidates	RARI candidates	3DWP candidates	Seniors candidates	AFP candidates
1. Glenn Druery; 2. Claire Simmonds; 3. Christopher Scrogie; 4. Patricia Hales; 5. Bridget Mahoney; 6. Glen McClure; 7. Robert Minale; 8. Paride Bucciarelli; 9. Marea Papandrea; 10. Clive Simonds; 11. Kylie Salmon; 12. Linda Lawson; 13. Nick Di Pietro; 14. Susan Murphy; 15. Antonio Gabrielle	1. Rod Smith; 2. Noel Clarke	1. Irene Henry; 2. Rubina Morgan	1. Mervyn Vessey; 2. Lesley Spencer	1. Jeffery Ritherdon; 2. Greg Willson
PBPP candidates	NNWDP candidates	CFP candidates	RPSP candidates	HELP candidates
1. Godfrey Bigot; 2. Allan Jones	1. Gordon Crisp; 2. Terry Corcoran	1. Michael Smith; 2. Maria-Elena Chidzey	1. Peter Moran; 2. Sue Moran	1. William McBride; 2. Mary-Rose Rooney
Arena candidates	MBPMT candidates	FWDP candidates	Earthsave candidates	NBCAP candidates
1. **Franca Arena**; 2. Judith Lancaster; 3. Beverley Alexander-Fisher	1. Kate Aitken Rasink; 2. Lucinda Barlow	1. Bruce Thompson; 2. Frank Sanzari	1. Brandon Raynor; 2. Simon Spicer	1. Brad Outzen; 2. Julie Outzen
GCLS candidates	NPPP candidates	Group BC candidates	OCF candidates	ASBP candidates
1. Geoff Beskin; 2. George Palasty	1. Samir Bargashoun; 2. Nuha Sangari	1. Joseph Kanan; 2. Victor Shen	1. Helen Caldicott; 2. Jennie Stewart; 3. Genevieve Rankin	1. Matthew Leigh-Jones; 2. Catherine Blasonato
AWP/STF candidates	DSL candidates	Wilderness candidates	MVCPP candidates	VPP candidates
1. Rebecca Lambert; 2. David Hulbert; 3. Helen Scott; 4. Martina Hulbert	1. Dick Nichols; 2. Helen Jarvis	1. Henry Bawden; 2. Colin Smith	1. Anthony Galati; 2. Diane Stace	1. Spencer Wu; 2. Ginette Farcell; 3. John Allen; 4. Chang Hu
CPI candidates	TALP candidates	AAFI candidates	ERP candidates	ICN candidates
1. Rodney Burton; 2. Graeme Cordiner	1. Donald Yorke-Goldney; 2. David Hopson	1. Edwin Woodger; 2. David Kitson	1. Jane Heinrichs; 2. Gregory Piol	1. Maire Sheehan; 2. Pam Arnold; 3. Helen Brown; 4. Michael Reymond
FTP candidates	CSA candidates	TCW candidates	THR candidates	FGF candidates
1. Jim Reid; 2. Mara Ashmore; 3. Andrew Coroneo; 4. Sam Spitzer	1. John Wearne; 2. Ros Brennan; 3. Andrew Hegedus; 4. Claire Braund; 5. Janet Hayes; 6. John Marsh; 7. Robert Harris; 8. Peter Botfield; 9. David Kelly	1. Robert Corowa; 2. Natalie Stevens	1. Kylie Kilgour; 2. Cecil See	1. Steven Wright; 2. Michael Uttley
WDP candidates	ABC candidates	NCPP candidates	HPP candidates	PAP candidates
1. Mario Fenech; 2. Jacquie Prosser	1. Adam Todd; 2. Suzanne Brook	1. Andrew Thompson; 2. Angela Flynn	1. Brett McHolme; 2. Dennis Robinson	1. John Piechocki; 2. Graham Ireland
Ungrouped candidates				
Ivor F Chris Lang; Eddy Watson; Michael Wright; Bob Miller; Mark Dixen				

== See also ==
- Members of the New South Wales Legislative Assembly, 1999–2003
- Members of the New South Wales Legislative Council, 1999–2003
