= Members of the New South Wales Legislative Council, 1999–2003 =

Members of the New South Wales Legislative Council, 1999–2003

Members of the New South Wales Legislative Council who served in the 54th Parliament were elected at the 1995 and 1999 elections. As members serve eight-year terms, half of the Council was elected in 1995 and did not face re-election in 1999, and the members elected in 1999 did not face re-election until 2007. The President was Meredith Burgmann.

Name	Party	End term	Years in office
Peter Breen	Legal System Reform	2007	1999–2007
Richard Bull (Note: National Party MLC Richard Bull resigned on 18 August 2000. Rick Colless was appointed to the vacancy on 30 August.)	National	2003	1984–2000
Meredith Burgmann	Labor	2007	1991–2007
Jan Burnswoods	Labor	2007	1991–2007
Arthur Chesterfield-Evans	Democrats	2007	1998–2007
Ian Cohen	Greens	2003	1995–2011
Rick Colless	National	2003	2000–2019
Alan Corbett	ABFFOC	2003	1995–2003
Michael Costa (Note: Labor MLC Johno Johnson resigned on 4 September 2001. Michael Costa was appointed to the vacancy on 6 September.)	Labor	2003	2001–2008
John Della Bosca	Labor	2007	1999–2010
Ron Dyer	Labor	2003	1979–2003
Michael Egan	Labor	2007	1986–2005
Amanda Fazio (Note: Labor MLC Jeff Shaw resigned on 4 July 2000. Amanda Fazio was appointed to the vacancy on 30 August.)	Labor	2007	2000–2015
Patricia Forsythe	Liberal	2007	1991–2006
Mike Gallacher	Liberal	2007	1996–2017
Jenny Gardiner	National	2007	1991–2015
Duncan Gay	National	2007	1988–2017
John Hannaford (Note: Liberal MLC John Hannaford resigned on 10 October 2000. Greg Pearce was appointed to the vacancy on 1 November.)	Liberal	2003	1984–1999
Don Harwin	Liberal	2007	1999–2022
John Hatzistergos	Labor	2007	1999–2011
John Jobling	Liberal	2003	1984–2003
Johno Johnson	Labor	2003	1976–2001
Malcolm Jones	Outdoor Recreation	2007	1999–2003
Richard Jones	Independent	2003	1988–2003
Tony Kelly	Labor	2003	1987–1988, 1997–2011
Charlie Lynn	Liberal	2003	1995–2015
Ian Macdonald	Labor	2007	1988–2010
Andy Manson (Note: Labor MLC Andy Manson resigned on 27 October 2000. Ian West was appointed to the vacancy on 1 November 2000.)	Labor	2003	1988–2000
Doug Moppett (Note: National Party MLC Doug Moppett died on 18 June 2002. Melinda Pavey was appointed to the vacancy on 3 September.)	National	2007	1976–1978, 1991–2000
Gordon Moyes (Note: Christian Democratic Party MLC Elaine Nile resigned on 27 August 2002. Gordon Moyes was appointed to the vacancy on 3 September.)	Christian Democrats	2003	2002–2011
Elaine Nile	Christian Democrats	2003	1988–2002
Fred Nile	Christian Democrats	2007	1981–2004, 2004–present
Eddie Obeid	Labor	2007	1991–2011
David Oldfield (Note: David Oldfield was elected as a One Nation member, but was expelled from the party in October 2000. He sat as an independent until late 2001, when he founded a splinter party One Nation NSW.)	One Nation / Independent / One Nation NSW	2007	1999–2007
Melinda Pavey	National	2007	2002–2015
Greg Pearce	Liberal	2003	2000–2017
Brian Pezzutti	Liberal	2007	1988–2003
Peter Primrose	Labor	2007	1996–present
Lee Rhiannon	Greens	2007	1999–2010
John Ryan	Liberal	2007	1991–2007
Janelle Saffin	Labor	2003	1995–2003
Jim Samios	Liberal	2003	1984–2003
Helen Sham-Ho (Note: Helen Sham-Ho had been elected as a Liberal MLC, but resigned from the party on 29 June 1998. She served out the remainder of her term as an independent.)	Independent	2003	1988–2003
Jeff Shaw	Labor	2007	1990–2000
Carmel Tebbutt	Labor	2003	1998–2005
John Tingle	Shooters	2003	1995–2006
Henry Tsang	Labor	2007	1999–2009
Ian West	Labor	2003	2000–2011
Peter Wong	Unity	2007	1999–2007
