= Members of the New South Wales Legislative Council, 1995–1999 =

Members of the New South Wales Legislative Council, 1995–1999

Members of the New South Wales Legislative Council who served in the 51st Parliament were affected by the 1991 referendum. The Council consisted of 42 members, 6 elected in 1988, 15 elected in 1991 and 21 elected in 1995. As members serve eight-year terms, half of the Council did not face re-election in 1995, and the members elected in 1995 did not face re-election until 2003. The President was Max Willis until 29 June 1998 and then Virginia Chadwick.

Name	Party	End term	Years in office
Franca Arena (Note: Franca Arena was expelled from the Labor Party on 7 November 1997, after her unsubstantiated allegations of pedophilia led to the suicide of a retired Supreme Court judge. She survived a vote to expel her from parliament, and served out the remainder of her term as an independent.)	Labor / Independent	1999	1981–1999
Richard Bull	National	2003	1984–2000
Meredith Burgmann	Labor	1999	1991–2007
Jan Burnswoods	Labor	1999	1991–2007
Virginia Chadwick	Liberal	1999	1978–1999
Arthur Chesterfield-Evans (Note: Democrat MLC Elisabeth Kirkby resigned on 25 June 1998. Arthur Chesterfield-Evans was appointed to fill the vacancy on the same day.)	Democrats	1999	1998–2007
Ian Cohen	Greens	2003	1995–2011
Alan Corbett	ABFFOC	2003	1995–2003
Ron Dyer	Labor	2003	1979–2003
Michael Egan	Labor	1999	1986–2005
Patricia Forsythe	Liberal	1999	1991–2006
Mike Gallacher (Note: Liberal MLC Stephen Mutch resigned on 31 January 1996 in order to contest the Australian House of Representatives seat of Cook at the 1996 federal election. Mike Gallacher was appointed to the vacancy on 17 April.)	Liberal	1999	1996–2017
Jenny Gardiner	National	1999	1991–2015
Duncan Gay	National	1999	1988–2017
Marlene Goldsmith	Liberal	1999	1988–1999
John Hannaford	Liberal	2003	1984–1999
Dorothy Isaksen	Labor	1999	1978–1988, 1990–1999
John Jobling	Liberal	2003	1984–2003
Johno Johnson	Labor	2003	1976–2001
Richard Jones (Note: Richard Jones was elected as a representative of the Australian Democrats, but resigned from the party on 12 March 1996. He served out the remainder of his term as an independent.)	Democrats / Independent	2003	1988–2003
Jim Kaldis	Labor	1999	1978–1999
Tony Kelly (Note: Labor MLC Patricia Staunton resigned on 2 September 1997. Former MLC Tony Kelly was appointed to the vacancy on 17 September.)	Labor	2003	1987–1988, 1997–2011
Mark Kersten (Note: National Party MLC Robert Webster resigned on 5 September 1995. Mark Kersten was appointed to the vacancy on 19 September.)	National	1999	1995–1999
Elisabeth Kirkby	Democrats	1999	1981–1998
Charlie Lynn (Note: Liberal MLC Ted Pickering resigned on 11 October 1995. Charlie Lynn was appointed to the vacancy on 19 October.)	Liberal	2003	1995–2015
Ian Macdonald	Labor	1999	1988–2010
Andy Manson	Labor	1999	1988–2000
Doug Moppett	National	1999	1976–1978, 1991–2000
Stephen Mutch	Liberal	1999	1988–1996
Elaine Nile	Christian Democrats	2003	1988–2002
Fred Nile	Christian Democrats	1999	1981–2004, 2004–present
Paul O'Grady (Note: Labor MLC Paul O'Grady resigned on 3 January 1996. Former MLA Peter Primrose was appointed to the vacancy on 17 April.)	Labor	1999	1988–1996
Eddie Obeid	Labor	1999	1991–2011
Brian Pezzutti	Liberal	1999	1988–2003
Ted Pickering	Liberal	1999	1976–1995
Peter Primrose	Labor	1999	1996–present
Bob Rowland Smith	National	1999	1974–1999
John Ryan	Liberal	1999	1991–2007
Janelle Saffin	Labor	2003	1995–2003
Jim Samios	Liberal	2003	1984–2003
Helen Sham-Ho (Note: Helen Sham-Ho was elected as a Liberal MLC, but resigned from the party on 29 June 1998. She served out the remainder of her term as an independent.)	Liberal / Independent	2003	1988–2003
Jeff Shaw	Labor	1999	1990–2000
Patricia Staunton	Labor	2003	1995–1997
Ann Symonds (Note: Labor MLC Ann Symonds resigned on 30 April 1998. Carmel Tebbutt was appointed to the vacancy on the same day.)	Labor	2003	1982–1998
Carmel Tebbutt	Labor	2003	1998–2005
John Tingle	Shooters	2003	1995–2006
Bryan Vaughan	Labor	1999	1981–1999
Robert Webster	National	2003	1991–1995
Max Willis	Liberal	1999	1970–1999
