= Results of the 1995 New South Wales Legislative Council election =

Legislative Council election for New South Wales, Australia in March 1995

Single transferable voting used to elect the 21 members up for election this year. This was an unusually large number of members to be elected through STV.

Party	Votes	%	+/–	Seats			
Party	Votes	%	+/–	Seats Won	Not Up	Total Seats	Seat Change
Liberal/National Coalition	1,300,743	38.63	▼6.85	8	10	18	▼2
Labor	1,191,177	35.38	▼2.04	8	9	17	▼1
Greens	126,591	3.76	▲0.43	1	0	1	▼1
Democrats	108,312	3.22	▼3.49	1	1	2	Steady
Call to Australia	101,556	3.02	▼0.57	1	1	2	Steady
Shooters	95,943	2.85	New	1	0	1	New
Independents Coalition	57,573	1.71	New	0	0	0	New
Against Further Immigration	55,864	1.66	New	0	0	0	New
No Aircraft Noise	45,105	1.34	New	0	0	0	New
ABFFOC	43,225	1.28	New	1	0	1	New
Daylight Saving Extension	43,164	1.28	New	0	0	0	New
Smokers Rights	32,470	0.96	New	0	0	0	New
The Seniors	27,914	0.83	New	0	0	0	New
Others	137,530	4.08	–	0	0	0	Steady
Total	3,367,167	100.00	–	21	21	42	–
Valid votes	3,367,167	93.87					
Invalid/blank votes	219,960	6.13	▼0.31				
Total votes	3,587,127	100.00	–				
Registered voters/turnout	3,837,102	93.49	▲0.22				
Source: ABC

This is a list of results for the Legislative Council at the 1995 New South Wales state election.

The Greens would win its first seat in the Legislative Council. The party would win a seat at every election since.

The Shooters, Fishers and Farmers Party would win its first seat in the Legislative Council. The party would hold a Legislative Council seat in all elections for the Legislative Council since this one.

== Results ==
1995 New South Wales state election: Legislative Council
Party	Candidate	Votes	%	±%
Quota		153,600		
Liberal/National Coalition	1. John Hannaford (elected 1); 2. Duncan Gay (elected 3); 3. Helen Sham-Ho (elected 5); 4. Stephen Mutch (elected 7); 5. Richard Bull (elected 9); 6. Jim Samios (elected 11); 7. Brian Pezzutti (elected 13); 8. John Jobling (elected 15); 9. Lloyd Coleman; 10. Robyn Kerr; 11. Len Robert; 12. Arch Humphrey; 13. Rick Lewis	1,300,743	38.49	−6.85
Labor	1. Michael Egan (elected 2); 2. Ann Symonds (elected 4); 3. Ron Dyer (elected 6); 4. Paul O'Grady (elected 8); 5. Johno Johnson (elected 10); 6. Andy Manson (elected 12); 7. Patricia Staunton (elected 14); 8. Janelle Saffin (elected 21); 9. Lawrie Daly; 10. Tony Kelly; 11. Frank Mossfield; 12. Hatton Kwok; 13. Michael Samaras; 14. Terry Hare; 15. John Hatzistergos	1,191,177	35.25	−2.04
Greens	1. Ian Cohen (elected 16); 2. Josephine Faith; 3. Leeza Dobbie	126,591	3.75	+0.42
Democrats	1. Richard Jones (elected 20); 2. Arthur Chesterfield-Evans; 3. Terri Richardson; 4. Simon Disney	108,312	3.21	−3.49
Call to Australia	1. Elaine Nile (elected 18); 2. Bruce Coleman; 3. Kevin Hume; 4. John Everingham; 5. Shirley Grigg; 6. Gamil Helmy; 7. Barry Lawrence	101,556	3.01	−0.57
Shooters	1. John Tingle (elected 17); 2. James Pirie; 3. Ted Orr; 4. Suzanne O'Connell; 5. Raymond Galea; 6. Chris Mitchell; 7. Daniel Redfern	95,943	2.84	+2.84
Independent Coalition	1. Graeme Cordiner; 2. Fiona Jessop; 3. Rodney Burton	57,573	1.70	+1.70
AAFI	1. Edwin Woodger; 2. Vivienne O'Callaghan	55,864	1.65	+1.65
No Aircraft Noise	1. Larry Hand; 2. Jean Lennane; 3. Clare Archibald	45,105	1.33	+1.33
ABFFOC	1. Alan Corbett (elected 19); 2. Erica Mackenzie	43,225	1.28	+1.28
Daylight Saving Extension	1. Tony de Govrik; 2. Dianne Siskos; 3. Kim de Govrik; 4. Vicki McElveney	43,164	1.28	+1.28
Smokers Rights	1. Mark Anthony; 2. Robert Mayfield	32,470	0.96	+0.96
The Seniors	1. Beryl Evans; 2. Lorraine Welsh; 3. Warren Page	27,914	0.83	+0.83
The Country	1. David Kilvert; 2. Tony Douglas	20,162	0.60	+0.60
Citizens Opinion Law Order Capital Punishment	1. Kevin Higgins; 2. Sandra Clogher	19,081	0.56	+0.56
Environment Inds	1. Robert Cummins; 2. Tony Vlatko	18,263	0.54	+0.54
Riders and Motorists	1. Piet Baird; 2. Greg Hirst	16,532	0.49	+0.49
Public Hospital Alliance	1. Maureen Davidson; 2. Bill Hughes	12,767	0.38	+0.38
Independent EFF	1. Eddie Azzopardi; 2. Alan Noble	12,012	0.36	−1.17
Grey Power	1. John Verheyen; 2. Richard Ross; 3. Olga Pickering	9,157	0.27	+0.27
Indigenous Peoples	1. Una Walker; 2. Essy Coffey	8,457	0.25	+0.25
Democratic Socialist	1. Bruce Threlfo; 2. Helen Jarvis	8,303	0.25	+0.25
Abolish State Government	1. Lyn Carson; 2. Stuart White	7,846	0.23	+0.23
Natural Law	1. Catherine Knoles; 2. Elizabeth Eager	5,784	0.17	+0.17
Stop Dual Occupancy	1. Anthony Meaney; 2. Judyth Dowdell	4,005	0.12	+0.12
Citizens Electoral Council	1. Robert Butler; 2. Garth Harris	2,687	0.08	+0.08
Confederate Action	1. Nick Harvey; 2. Les Gillman	2,222	0.07	+0.07
Independent	Frank Arkell	1,824	0.05	+0.05
Independent	Joan Manna	440	0.01	+0.01
Total formal votes		3,379,179	93.89	−0.44
Informal votes		219,960	6.11	+0.44
Turnout		3,599,139	93.80	+0.22

== Continuing members ==
The following MLCs were not up for re-election this year.

Member	Party	Term
Virginia Chadwick	Liberal	1988–1999
Marlene Goldsmith	Liberal	1988–1999
Ted Pickering	Liberal	1991–1995
Max Willis	Liberal	1991–1999
Patricia Forsythe	Liberal	1991–1999
John Ryan	Liberal	1991–1999
Bob Smith	National	1988–1999
Robert Webster	National	1991–1995
Doug Moppett	National	1991–1999
Jenny Gardiner	National	1991–1999
Ian Macdonald	Labor	1988–1999
Jim Kaldis	Labor	1988–1999
Dorothy Isaksen	Labor	1990–1999
Eddie Obeid	Labor	1991–1999
Jeff Shaw	Labor	1991–1999
Bryan Vaughan	Labor	1991–1999
Meredith Burgmann	Labor	1991–1999
Franca Arena	Labor	1991–1999
Jan Burnswoods	Labor	1991–1999
Elisabeth Kirkby	Democrats	1991–1998
Fred Nile	Call to Australia	1991–1999

== See also ==
- Results of the 1995 New South Wales state election (Legislative Assembly)
- Candidates of the 1995 New South Wales state election
- Members of the New South Wales Legislative Council, 1995–1999
