= Downsend School =

Coordinates: 51°18′0″N 0°18′52″W

Location
- Leatherhead Road; Leatherhead, Surrey, KT22 8TJ; England

Information
- Type: Private school
- Motto: Nihil Virtuti Invium (Latin for Nothing is denied to valour)
- Religious affiliation: Non Denominational
- Established: 1898
- Local authority: Surrey
- Department for Education URN: 125351 Tables
- Executive Head: Rebecca Tear
- Gender: Mixed
- Age: 6 months to 16
- Enrolment: 835
- Website: www.downsend.co.uk

Downsend School is a co-educational independent school for pupils aged between six months and eighteen years. In 2020, Downsend became a through-school, offering a three-year GCSE. It is located in Leatherhead and Ashtead, in Surrey, UK.

It is a school for boys and girls, and takes on pupils from 6 months to 18 years of age across its four schools in Ashtead and Leatherhead. The school does not have charitable status, being run as a business by Cognita Schools Limited. As of 2025, Downsend's executive head is Rebecca Tear.

== History ==
Downsend was founded, owned for nearly a century, and headmastered by three generations of the Linford family. A. H. Linford had started Peterborough Lodge, a preparatory school for about 100 boys aged 5 to 15, including 5 to 10 boarders, at 143 Finchley Road, Hampstead, about 1898. During the First World War he opened Downsend for the boarders from Peterborough Lodge, and in 1940 after the beginning of the Second World War the two schools amalgamated at the Downsend site between Leatherhead and Ashtead. A. H. Linford's son Cedric T. Linford became headmaster.

For about a year from 1942 the boarders were taken out of the London area to Hurstpierpoint College in Sussex, where they were under the control of the mathematics master. C. T. Linford remained headmaster, also teaching Latin and Greek, until his son Christopher J. Linford took over in 1968. The school was run as a non-denominational preparatory school for boys aged 8 to 13. In 1968 the school had 220 boys; Christopher Linford expanded the business to four schools in the area educating a total of around 900 boys and girls. In 2002 no one in the family was willing to take on the responsibility of running the school and it was sold to Asquith Court Schools Ltd.

In 2024, it was announced that Executive Headteacher Ian Thorpe would be stepping down from his role after 12 years of service, with incoming Executive Headteacher Rebecca Tear taking over the position from September 2025.

Downsend Sixth officially opened in September 2025, making history for Downsend School with its first cohort of 11 pupils.

== The School ==
Downsend is located at 1 Leatherhead Road, Leatherhead, Surrey KT22 8TJ, just outside Ashtead. The school operates across multiple sites in the local area, including two Little Downsend nursery and pre-prep locations in Leatherhead and Ashtead.

The school structure is as follows: Little Downsend Ashtead provides care and education for children aged 6 months to 4 years. Little Downsend Leatherhead caters for children from age 2 (First Steps) through to age 7 (Year 2). The main school in Leatherhead educates pupils from Year 3 to Year 11. Downsend Sixth, the school's sixth form campus, is located in central Leatherhead and provides A Level education for students in Year 12 and Year 13.

== Facilities ==
There is a sports hall and an indoor, heated swimming pool with multiple changing rooms and a fitness suite. There are a total of six tennis courts on tarmac surfaces, and a covered area. On 12 May 2007 the local Member of Parliament, Chris Grayling, opened the new Astro Turf.

== Sport ==
Downsend has grass playing fields and an astro-turf one located on site. This was opened to pupils in 2007. The school has several rugby, football, cricket, and rounders pitches. The tarmac area can be converted into tennis courts, netball pitches, basketball courts, or hockey pitches (although hockey is generally on the astro). The sports hall can be used for basketball as it has several hoops and pitches. Badminton can be played in the hall as can gymnastics and volleyball. Inside the hall, there are four cricket nets. The school has sports teams in soccer, rugby, netball, cricket, rounders, basketball, athletics, swimming, and hockey. These teams compete in inter-school matches as well as school games.

The school competed regularly in the National Biathlon Championships, in 2012 held at Crystal Palace and, in 2012, maintained its record of seven national titles in a row.

== Little Downsend Schools (Ashtead and Leatherhead) ==
The two Little Downsend Schools are located around the main site in the towns of Leatherhead and Ashtead. They take children from 6 months to 7 years of age and pupils can transfer up to the main school. Little Downsend has its own Head Teacher and heads of school.

== Notable alumni ==
- Richard Stanley Leigh Jones (born 1940) — Australian parliamentarian
- John Marrack (10 February 1921 – 7 November 2009) — naval officer, Queen's Harbourmaster 1962
- Dominic Sibley (born 1995) — England cricketer
- Richard Williamson (8 March 1940 - 29 January 2025) — Catholic Bishop
