= Peter Wong (Australian politician) =

Chinese-born Australian politician (born 1942)

Peter Wong AM
- 黃肇強

Member of the New South Wales Legislative Council
- In office 27 March 1999 – 23 March 2007

Personal details
- Born: 12 October 1942 (age 84) Republic of China
- Party: Unity Party (1998–present)
- Other political affiliations: Liberal Party (until 1998)
- Education: University of Sydney
- Occupation: Specialist general practitioner

Chinese name
- Traditional Chinese: 黃肇強
- Simplified Chinese: 黃肇强
Transcriptions
Standard Mandarin
- Hanyu Pinyin: Huáng Zhàoqiáng
Hakka
- Pha̍k-fa-sṳ: Vòng Seu-khiòng

Peter Hon Jung Wong AM (Chinese: 黃肇強) (born 12 October 1942) is a Chinese-born Australian politician. A figure in the Sydney Chinese community and former member of the Liberal Party of Australia, he became concerned over the Liberal Party's refusal to oppose strongly the rise of Pauline Hanson and her One Nation Party, and ultimately went on to found the Unity Party. He served as their leader from 1998 to 1999 and represented the party in the New South Wales Legislative Council from March 1999 until March 2007. Wong was made a Member of the Order of Australia in 1996.

== Early life ==
Wong was born in China, but his Hakka family fled from that Communist Party-controlled country when he was eight. His family briefly settled in Borneo, where his father provided free medical care to the poor, but they later moved on to Sydney, Australia.

Wong ultimately studied medicine at the University of Sydney and went into private practice, working as a general practitioner in Sydney for many years. He became actively involved in the Chinese Australian community, which saw him appointed as a member of the Ethnic Affairs Commission from 1991 to 1997.

Wong became extensively involved in community work; amongst other things, he founded the Chinese Catholic Community, co-founded the Australian Chinese Charity Foundation and served as chair of the Chinese Migrant Welfare Association.

He co-founded the Welfare Committee for Chinese Students in 1990 and through it played a role in the Hawke government's eventual decision to give asylum to 42,000 Chinese university students after the Tiananmen Square protests of 1989. Through his work with these organisations, Wong often oversaw the provision of assistance to newly arrived migrants and the underprivileged in the Sydney Chinese community and acted as a spokesperson for the community in the media.

== Initial concern about Hanson and One Nation ==
Wong was an active member of the Liberal Party of Australia for many years. He served as secretary of the party's Chinatown branch, acted as an advisor to Philip Ruddock and was a prominent supporter of federal MP Brendan Nelson and prominent candidate for Lord Mayor of Sydney Kathryn Greiner.

However, after the 1996 federal election and 1998 Queensland state election, Wong became increasingly concerned about the rising popularity of controversial right-wing federal MP Pauline Hanson and her One Nation Party, who had run on a platform of reducing Asian immigration. When the Liberal Party did little to stop the growth of the Hanson movement and made clear their intention to preference One Nation over the opposition Australian Labor Party, Wong made his concern public, though he kept it relatively muted.

When the Liberal Party continued to insist on preferencing Hanson, Wong joined a number of Chinese community leaders in campaigning against the preference decision. Wong continued to be dissatisfied with the Liberal response, and on 24 June, he publicly resigned from the party, angrily criticising the party's refusal to more strongly oppose Hanson. His remarks received media attention, which was further amplified when Helen Sham-Ho, a Chinese Australian Liberal member of the New South Wales Legislative Council, also resigned from the party several days later.

== Founding the Unity Party ==
With the 1998 election looming on the horizon, Wong initially planned to stand as an independent candidate. However, he was persuaded to look at starting a separate political party with the specific aim of opposing Hanson and promoting multiculturalism. Weeks of discussions with other ethnic leaders around the nation followed, and the result, the result, the Unity Party, was announced on 3 July 1998, with Wong as its first convener - in effect, leader.

Wong quickly set about finding candidates and members, as well as setting up branches in other states, and the new party saw rapid growth. He was particularly insistent that the new party must be multicultural, instead of representing one or two ethnic groups, and broke with Sham-Ho over the issue. For this reason, it was initially intended to find a non-Asian leader to broaden the party's appeal in advance of the 1998 federal election, but this never occurred, and Wong led the party into the election. While the Unity Party was notably liberal on race issues, Wong's conservatism was evident in their policies against abortion and voluntary euthanasia.

Wong chose not to run for office himself at the federal election, but the party fielded candidates in 72 of the 148 electorates. They fell well short of having any members elected, but had outpolled the Australian Democrats and Australian Greens in some lower house seats - although their main Senate ticket was nearly outpolled by the Christian Democratic Party in primary votes. With the election over, Wong and the Unity Party then turned their attention to the 1999 New South Wales state election, where the party had a greater chance of gaining representation in parliament, as their core base lay in the state.
