= 1999 New South Wales state election =

State election for New South Wales, Australia in March 1999

- 27 March 1999

All 93 seats in the New South Wales Legislative Assembly and 21 (of the 42) seats in the New South Wales Legislative Council 47 Assembly seats were needed for a majority
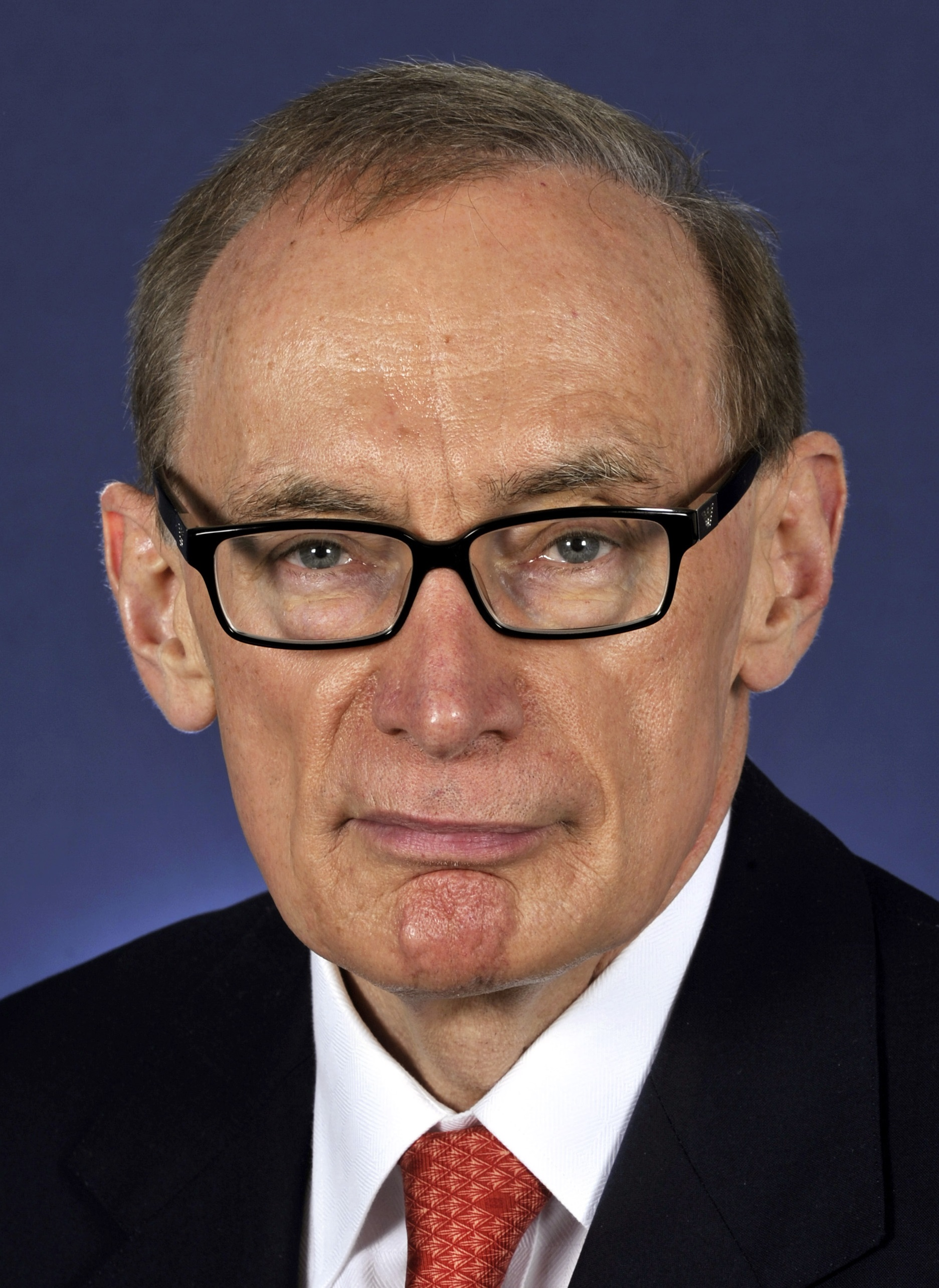

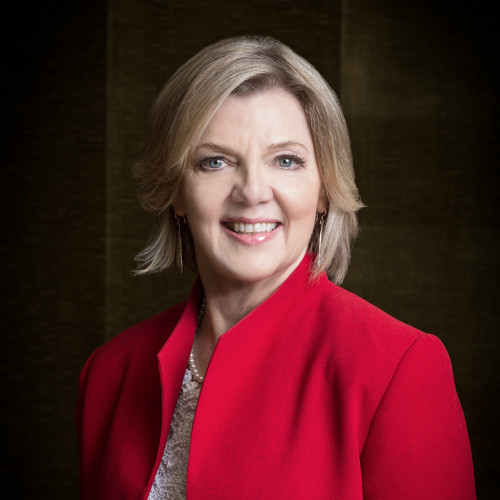
	First party	Second party
Leader	Bob Carr	Kerry Chikarovski
Party	Labor	Liberal/National coalition
Leader since	6 April 1988	8 December 1998
Leader's seat	Maroubra	Lane Cove
Last election	50 seats	46 seats
Seats won	55	33
Seat change	▲5	▼13
Popular vote	1,576,886	1,258,711
Percentage	42.21%	33.69%
Swing	▲0.94	▼10.25
TPP	55.96%	44.04%
TPP swing	▲7.0pp	▼7.0pp
- Two-candidate-preferred margin by electorate
Premier before election
Bob Carr
Labor
Elected Premier
Bob Carr
Labor

The 1999 New South Wales state election was held on Saturday, 27 March. All seats in the New South Wales Legislative Assembly and half the seats in the New South Wales Legislative Council was up for election. The Incumbent New South Wales Premier Bob Carr won a second term with a 7% swing of vote against the Liberal National Party led by Kerry Chikarovski. The poll was the first to be held after two key changes to the electoral system. In 1997, the number of electoral districts was reduced from 99 to 93. In 1995, fixed four-year terms were introduced. As of 2026, this is the most recent NSW election in which the leader of the winning party would complete a full term as premier.

== Background ==
=== Carr government ===
The Labor Party's victory at the 1995 election was built on a number of specific promises, backed by a well directed marginal seat campaign. On taking office, the Carr Government faced difficulties presiding over a public sector that had fundamentally changed during the seven years of the Greiner and Fahey Governments. The major dynamic of the Carr Government's first term was to be the clash between the old fashioned promises that won the 1995 election and the new orthodoxy of public sector financial accountability.

This new orthodoxy had its genesis in the election of the Hawke government at the 1983 federal election. The new financial structures applied by Canberra to deal with the nation's trade imbalance created problems that forced change on the States. While the term microeconomic reform was not yet in use when the Greiner Government was elected in 1988, New South Wales became the first State that committed itself to a fundamental examination of the role and activities of the public sector. Focusing initially on the efficiency of service delivery and drawing distinctions between commercial functions and core Government services, the process evolved into using market mechanisms to improve the efficiency of services for which the public sector had previously been the monopoly provider. Later, the Jeff Kennett government in Victoria and the Howard government in Canberra were to take the process further with the wide scale use of privatisation and the outsourcing of services.

The Carr Government was always going to face problems because of the financial burden imposed by the building programme associated with the 2000 Olympics. The Government took the responsible course of choosing to fund the programme internally rather than through debt, resulting in the re-direction of Government expenditure. This approach created dilemmas with two key promises made by Labor to win the 1995 election.

The first was a promise by Carr and his Health Minister Andrew Refshauge to resign if they did not halve hospital waiting lists within twelve months. Devoting extra resources, persuading the majority of the medical profession to participate and improving hospital processes allowed the Government to meet the commitment. The Federal government cut of funding to hospitals that followed made the waiting list numbers rise again and increased the scepticism of the public to any claim . An attempt to redistribute health infrastructure and resources by merging St Vincent's Hospital in Darlinghurst with St George Hospital in Hurstville was one of several politically damaging attempts by the Government to live within its financial means.

The second problem was a promise to abolish the tolls on the privately operated M4 and M5 motorways. Once elected, the Government announced it could not lift the tolls given the cost and contractual obligations. This was disastrous for the Government's standing, forcing it in October 1996 to announce a toll cash-back scheme for private use in an effort to recover lost support.

Dealing with state debt, building the Olympic infrastructure and meeting the cost of normal Government functions caused Cabinet to propose a controversial solution in 1997: sell the State's electricity assets. The Victorian Government had raised billions in this way, and New South Wales had already divided the generating capacity into separate corporations that made privatisation possible. The policy had the additional advantage of removing the financial risk faced by the State since the introduction of a national electricity grid with full competition between suppliers. This was privatisation taken too far for the Labor Party, a State Conference refusing to sanction the sale. Finances remained tight but the Cabinet back-down solved a different problem. The Coalition was still committed to electricity privatisation, allowing the Carr Government to appeal to its own traditional base by warning the only alternative Government would be far harsher.

A redistribution was due before the 1999 election. Before starting the process, Labor number crunchers turned to deciding what number of Lower House seats delivered the best advantage for Labor. With an increase in members ruled out by the premier, the eventual strategy adopted was a cut to 93 MPs.

Finalised in July 1998, the new boundaries were a disappointment for the Government. Rather than strengthening Labor's hold on office, they removed the Government's majority, with only 46 of the 93 seats notionally held by Labor. The Coalition was still disadvantaged, given that it won more of the vote in 1995 and still needed a bigger swing than Labor to take office. However, the Coalition was relieved that the boundaries were considerably fairer than Labor had tried to arrange.

Ten seats were abolished and four created, another six seats adopting new names. A net four seats disappeared in Sydney and one in Newcastle. The far western seats of Broken Hill and Murray were abolished and fashioned into a new notionally National Party seat called Murray-Darling. Several Members were forced to move while three seats, Maitland, Strathfield and the new seat of Ryde, were to see contests between sitting MPs.

Retiring former Ministers caused five by-elections in May 1996, Labor receiving a bonus when former Federal MP Harry Woods won the North Coast seat of Clarence from the National Party, increasing the Government's majority to three.

=== Liberal opposition ===
Peter Collins had taken over the Liberal leadership after the 1995 election. Although he had held several senior portfolios in the previous Government, he remained relatively unknown to the electorate. Despite the low profile of Collins, the Coalition remained competitive in opinion polls until the middle of 1998. Collins was deposed by a surprise coup in December 1998 and replaced by Kerry Chikarovski, the first woman to lead a major party in New South Wales. Less experienced at handling the media than Collins, especially television, Chikarovski struggled during the March 1999 campaign. The Coalition's campaign was also hampered by its unpopular proposal to sell the State's electricity assets. The task of selling it became more difficult when polls indicated that the promised cash rebates made voters even more suspicious of privatisation. As a result, Chikarovski bore much of the criticism of the Coalition's performance.

=== Christian Democratic Party ===
The Call to Australia Party changed its name to the Christian Democratic Party in 1998.

== Results ==
=== Legislative Assembly ===
Party	Votes	%	+/–	Seats	+/–
Labor	1,576,886	42.21	▲0.94	55	▲5
Liberal	927,368	24.82	▼8.02	20	▼9
National	331,343	8.87	▼2.23	13	▼4
One Nation	281,147	7.53	New	0	New
Independents	190,793	5.11	▲0.41	5	▲2
Greens	145,019	3.88	▲1.31	0	Steady
Democrats	124,520	3.33	▲0.49	0	Steady
Christian Democrats	55,819	1.49	New	0	New
Unity	39,562	1.06	New	0	New
Others	63,622	1.70	▼1.54	0	Steady
Total	3,736,079	100.00	–	93	–
Valid votes	3,736,079	97.49			
Invalid/blank votes	96,000	2.51	▼3.36		
Total votes	3,832,079	100.00	–		
Registered voters/turnout	4,115,059	93.12	▼0.68		
Two-party-preferred
Labor	1,805,365	55.96	▲7.14		
Liberal/National Coalition	1,420,965	44.04	▼7.14		
Total	3,226,330	100.00	–		

Popular vote
Labor	42.21%
Liberal	24.82%
National	8.87%
One Nation	7.53%
Independents	5.11%
Greens	3.88%
Democrats	3.33%
Christian Democrats	1.49%
Unity	1.06%
Others	1.70%
Two-party-preferred vote
Labor	55.96%
Coalition	44.04%
Parliamentary seats
Labor	55
Liberal	20
National	13
Independents	5

The Legislative Assembly (lower house) election was a landslide. Labor's historic hold on the city of Broken Hill was maintained when Labor won Murray-Darling. Labor also won the head-to-head contests between sitting MPs in the notionally Liberal seats of Maitland, Ryde and Strathfield. Labor also gained Georges River, Menai and Miranda in southern Sydney and the far North Coast seat of Tweed. It retained Clarence and gained South Coast. Optional preferential voting was responsible for Labor holding Clarence, with the failure of Liberal voters to direct preferences denying the National candidate victory.

The two-party swing to Labor was 7.2%, winning 56.0% of the two-party preferred vote. However, Labor's primary vote had barely risen while the combined Coalition vote was down 10%. A new arrival, Pauline Hanson's One Nation Party, fresh from success at the 1998 Queensland and Federal elections, polled 7.5% of the vote. Exhausted One Nation preferences played their part in creating the swing against the Coalition. Worse for the National Party, both Dubbo and Northern Tablelands were lost to Independents, bringing to three the number of Independents in safe National Party seats.

=== Legislative Council ===
Party	Votes	%	+/–	Seats			
Party	Votes	%	+/–	Seats Won	Not Up	Total Seats	Seat Change
Labor	1,325,819	37.27	▲2.02	8	8	16	▼1
Liberal/National Coalition	974,352	27.39	▼11.02	6	8	14	▼4
One Nation	225,668	6.34	New	1	0	1	New
Democrats	142,768	4.01	▲0.80	1	1	2	Steady
Christian Democrats	112,699	3.17	▲0.16	1	1	2	Steady
Greens	103,463	2.91	▼0.84	1	1	2	▲1
Shooters	59,295	1.67	▼1.17	0	1	1	Steady
Progressive Labour	56,037	1.58	New	0	0	0	New
Marijuana Smokers Rights	43,991	1.24	New	0	0	0	New
Legal System Reform	35,712	1.00	New	1	0	1	New
Unity	34,785	0.98	New	1	0	1	New
Country Summit Alliance	31,771	0.89	New	0	0	0	New
Registered Clubs Party	27,564	0.77	New	0	0	0	New
Gun Owners & Sporting Hunters	25,106	0.71	New	0	0	0	New
Country NSW Party	19,819	0.56	▼0.04	0	0	0	Steady
What's Doing?	18,318	0.51	New	0	0	0	New
ABFFOC	15,800	0.44	▼0.84	0	1	1	Steady
Outdoor Recreation	7,264	0.20	New	1	0	1	New
Others	297,530	8.36	*	0	0	0	Steady
Total	3,557,761	100.00	–	21	21	42	–
Valid votes	3,557,761	92.83					
Invalid/blank votes	274,594	7.17	▲1.06				
Total votes	3,832,355	100.00	–				
Registered voters/turnout	4,115,059	93.13	▼0.67				

This election was known derogatively as the "Tablecloth Election", due to the unprecedented number of candidates contesting the Upper House, totalling 264 candidates for 81 parties. This meant that each of the 4 million ballot papers issued measured approximately 70x100cm, the size of a small tablecloth. A number of party names on the ballot were noted by election analyst Antony Green to be "clearly misleading in intent", such as the Gay and Lesbian Party, founded by heterosexual campaigners advocating for four-wheel drive access to the state's national parks.

The rules for nominating candidates to the Legislative Council were tightened to prevent this from happening again, as well as the abolition of group ticket preferences in response to Malcolm Jones of the Outdoor Recreation Party being elected with 0.2% of the vote.

=== Overview ===
In the New South Wales Legislative Assembly:

- the Labor Party won 55 seats
- the Liberal Party won 20 seats
- the National Party won 13 seats
- independent candidates won 5 seats

Elections were held for half the seats in the New South Wales Legislative Council:

- the Labor Party won 8 seats for a total of 16
- the Liberal Party won 4 seats for a total of 10 (although Helen Sham-Ho was sitting as an independent)
- the National Party won 2 seats for a total of 4
- the Greens won 1 seat for a total of 2
- the Christian Democratic Party won 1 seat for a total of 2
- the Australian Democrats won 1 seat for a total of 2 (although Richard Jones was sitting as an independent)
- One Nation won 1 seat for a total of 1
- the Unity Party won 1 seat for a total of 1
- the Outdoor Recreation Party won 1 seat for a total of 1
- Reform the Legal System won 1 seat for a total of 1
- the Shooters Party won 0 seats for a total of 1
- A Better Future for Our Children won 0 seats for a total of 1

== Seats changing hands ==
Seat	Pre-1999			Swing	Post-1999		
Seat	Party	Member	Margin	Swing	Margin	Member	Party
Burrinjuck	Liberal	Alby Schultz	9.9	-11.1	1.2	Katrina Hodgkinson	National
Dubbo	National	Gerry Peacocke	18.0	-18.0	0.02	Tony McGrane	Independent
Georges River	Liberal	Marie Ficarra	2.0	-8.3	6.3	Kevin Greene	Labor
Maitland	Liberal	Peter Blackmore	0.9	-1.9	1.0	John Price	Labor
Menai	Liberal	Notional - New seat	1.9	-6.1	4.2	Alison Megarrity	Labor
Miranda	Liberal	Ron Phillips	5.2	-7.5	2.3	Barry Collier	Labor
Murray-Darling	National	Notional - New seat	3.5	-7.7	4.2	Peter Black	Labor
Northern Tablelands	National	Ray Chappell	14.6	-24.0	9.4	Richard Torbay	Independent
Ryde	Liberal	Notional - New seat	4.2	-10.8	6.6	John Watkins	Labor
South Coast	Liberal	Eric Ellis	4.6	-5.1	0.5	Wayne Smith	Labor
Strathfield	Liberal	Bruce MacCarthy	2.8	-11.2	8.4	Paul Whelan	Labor
Tweed	National	Notional - New seat	2.2	-4.8	2.6	Neville Newell	Labor

- Members listed in italics did not recontest their seats.
- In addition, Labor retained the seat of Clarence, which it had gained from the National Party in the previous by-election.

== Post-election pendulum ==
Labor seats (55)
Marginal
Clarence	Harry Woods	ALP	0.2%
South Coast	Wayne Smith	ALP	0.5%
Maitland	John Price	ALP	1.0%
Miranda	Barry Collier	ALP	2.3%
Tweed	Neville Newell	ALP	2.6%
Menai	Alison Megarrity	ALP	4.2%
Murray-Darling	Peter Black	ALP	4.2%
Fairly safe
Georges River	Kevin Greene	ALP	6.3%
Ryde	John Watkins	ALP	6.6%
Kogarah	Cherie Burton	ALP	7.5%
Keira	David Campbell	ALP	7.9% v IND
Strathfield	Paul Whelan	ALP	8.4%
Drummoyne	John Murray	ALP	9.4%
The Entrance	Grant McBride	ALP	9.7%
Safe
Heathcote	Ian McManus	ALP	10.4%
Peats	Marie Andrews	ALP	11.3%
Blue Mountains	Bob Debus	ALP	11.8%
Coogee	Ernie Page	ALP	12.3%
Port Stephens	John Bartlett	ALP	12.3%
Parramatta	Gabrielle Harrison	ALP	14.5%
Granville	Kim Yeadon	ALP	14.6%
Londonderry	Jim Anderson	ALP	14.9%
Wentworthville	Pam Allan	ALP	15.4%
Wyong	Paul Crittenden	ALP	15.5%
Rockdale	George Thompson	ALP	16.5%
Swansea	Milton Orkopoulos	ALP	16.6%
Penrith	Faye Lo Po'	ALP	16.7%
Riverstone	John Aquilina	ALP	17.2%
Mulgoa	Diane Beamer	ALP	17.6%
Kiama	Matt Brown	ALP	17.7%
Bathurst	Gerard Martin	ALP	17.8%
East Hills	Alan Ashton	ALP	18.3%
Cabramatta	Reba Meagher	ALP	18.9% v IND
Lake Macquarie	Jeff Hunter	ALP	19.2%
Charlestown	Richard Face	ALP	19.3%
Blacktown	Paul Gibson	ALP	19.4%
Campbelltown	Michael Knight	ALP	19.9%
Maroubra	Bob Carr	ALP	19.9%
Marrickville	Andrew Refshauge	ALP	21.5% v GRN
Newcastle	Bryce Gaudry	ALP	22.4%
Wallsend	John Mills	ALP	22.6%
Cessnock	Kerry Hickey	ALP	22.6% v ONP
Illawarra	Marianne Saliba	ALP	22.8%
Smithfield	Carl Scully	ALP	22.8%
Macquarie Fields	Craig Knowles	ALP	23.5%
Auburn	Peter Nagle	ALP	24.3%
Lakemba	Morris Iemma	ALP	24.7%
Port Jackson	Sandra Nori	ALP	25.1%
Canterbury	Kevin Moss	ALP	25.2%
Mount Druitt	Richard Amery	ALP	25.8%
Heffron	Deirdre Grusovin	ALP	26.1%
Fairfield	Joe Tripodi	ALP	28.3%
Liverpool	Paul Lynch	ALP	28.6%
Wollongong	Col Markham	ALP	28.7%
Bankstown	Tony Stewart	ALP	30.2%

Liberal/National seats (33)
Marginal
Monaro	Peter Webb	NAT	0.2%
Albury	Ian Glachan	LIB	1.0% v IND
Burrinjuck	Katrina Hodgkinson	NAT	1.2%
Gosford	Chris Hartcher	LIB	2.3%
Hornsby	Stephen O'Doherty	LIB	2.7%
Camden	Liz Kernohan	LIB	3.5%
Cronulla	Malcolm Kerr	LIB	5.1%
Southern Highlands	Peta Seaton	LIB	5.7%
Fairly safe
Orange	Russell Turner	NAT	6.3%
Epping	Andrew Tink	LIB	7.1%
Bega	Russell Smith	LIB	7.1%
Lane Cove	Kerry Chikarovski	LIB	7.4%
Wagga Wagga	Daryl Maguire	LIB	7.5%
Oxley	Andrew Stoner	NAT	8.0%
Baulkham Hills	Wayne Merton	LIB	8.1%
Coffs Harbour	Andrew Fraser	NAT	8.3%
Lismore	Thomas George	NAT	8.5%
Safe
Upper Hunter	George Souris	NAT	10.5%
Wakehurst	Brad Hazzard	LIB	10.8%
Willoughby	Peter Collins	LIB	11.1%
Murrumbidgee	Adrian Piccoli	NAT	12.0%
Ballina	Don Page	NAT	12.0%
North Shore	Jillian Skinner	LIB	12.3%
Vaucluse	Peter Debnam	LIB	12.5%
Myall Lakes	John Turner	NAT	12.9%
Hawkesbury	Kevin Rozzoli	LIB	13.3%
The Hills	Michael Richardson	LIB	14.7%
Lachlan	Ian Armstrong	NAT	16.3%
Port Macquarie	Rob Oakeshott	NAT	16.6%
Barwon	Ian Slack-Smith	NAT	17.2%
Pittwater	John Brogden	LIB	18.8%
Ku-ring-gai	Barry O'Farrell	LIB	20.0%
Davidson	Andrew Humpherson	LIB	21.1%
Crossbench seats (5)
Dubbo	Tony McGrane	IND	0.02% v NAT
Manly	David Barr	IND	1.3% v LIB
Northern Tablelands	Richard Torbay	IND	9.4% v NAT
Bligh	Clover Moore	IND	9.8% v ALP
Tamworth	Tony Windsor	IND	35.2% v ALP

== See also ==
- Candidates of the 1999 New South Wales state election
