= Ian West =

Australian politician

Member of Legislative Council of New South Wales
- In office 1 November 2000 – 4 March 2011
- Preceded by: Andy Manson

Personal details
- Born: 3 August 1951 (age 74)
- Party: Labor

Ian William West (born 3 August 1951) is an Australian politician and former Labor Party member of the New South Wales Legislative Council, serving from 2000 until his retirement in 2011.

== Early life ==
West was born in 1951 to parents Bill and Rita, one of three siblings, and was raised in the western suburbs of Sydney. He attended Bass High School and attended the University of Technology Sydney to study law. He obtained a distinction in Advanced Industrial Law, but ultimately did not complete his degree.

== Career ==
He joined the Chester Hill branch of the Labor Party in 1968. He became an organizer for the NSW Federated Miscellaneous Workers' Union in 1976. He was elected NSW Assistant Secretary of the Liquor Hospitality and Miscellaneous Workers' Union in 1981 and held that role until 2000. In 1991 he became a member of the New South Wales Administrative Committee, and remained a member until 2001.

He was touted for nomination to the New South Wales Legislative Council in 1998 when he faced a party pre-selection battle for the vacancy caused by the departure of Ann Symonds. He was not successful at that pre-selection.

=== Parliament ===
West did later enter the New South Wales Parliament following his nomination to the casual vacancy in the Legislative Council caused by the resignation of Andy Manson. West was sworn into Parliament in a joint sitting on 1 November 2000.

He first faced election in the 2003 New South Wales general election, where he was pre-selected as number fourth on the Labor Party ticket. He was elected with the eighth highest quota.

In Parliament, he was the Chair of the Standing Committee on Social Issues and is also a general member of the Stay Safe Committee and General Purpose Standing Committee 3.

He was Deputy Government Whip from 28 March 2003 to 2 March 2007. He was a member of the Joint Standing Committee on Road Safety between 5 May 2003 and 2 March 2007, and also the Standing Committee on Social Issues from 21 May 2003 to 2 March 2007.

He was the Legislative Council Representative on the Macquarie University Council from 7 May 2003 to 31 December 2005.
