= Earthsave (political party) =

Green party active in New South Wales

Earthsave was an Australian political party that ran candidates for the 1999 New South Wales state election. The party had a broadly environmentalist focus, and had a wide range of policies. The party almost got its major candidate elected. Out of approximately 266 candidates vying for 21 seats the lead candidate came in position 23. The party was very successful in promoting support for vegetarianism and veganism and forced the Green Party to adopt more pro animal rights policies. It also gave environmentally-minded but fiscally conservative voters an alternative party to vote for, Earthsave's policies sitting to the political right compared with those of the Greens on some issues and to the left on other issues.

== Pro traditional family ==
At the New South Wales (AU) state election of 1999, Brandon Raynor stood for election under his newly minted EarthSave party. Raynor stood for a pro traditional family approach to raising children comparing the traditional family to healthy soil in organic farming.

In The Northern Star, a daily tabloid based at Lismore, NSW, a couple of local gay activists had criticised Raynor's ignorance and fear-mongering. Their letter to the editor was followed by an article, an editorial, and many dozens of other readers' letters in a vigorous debate about homosexuality, spanning a period of several weeks.

Raynor received a large number of votes in the Northern Rivers where a local herbal activist who runs Happy High Herbs stood as the EarthSave candidate.

EarthSave received 6,391 primary votes statewide, but received a huge number of preferential votes from across the political spectrum.

== McDonald's opposition ==
Earthsave was opposed to expansion of McDonald's in the Blue Mountains. Party leader Brandon Raynor led the successful campaign to stop McDonald's entering the upper Blue Mountains and worked with the Earth Repair Foundation to propose to McDonald's Australia to consider opening a restaurant serving healthy, local and environmentally friendly food under the title of McNatural's.

Earthsave also engaged in protests for the World Day of Action Against McDonald's, 16 October 1996.
