= Henry Tsang =

Australian politician

The Honourable Henry Tsang OAM
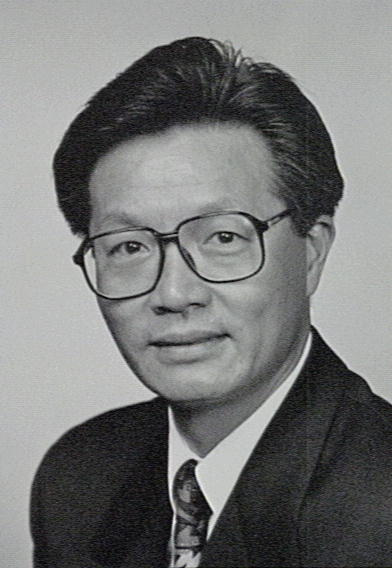

Member of Legislative Council of New South Wales
- In office 27 March 1999 – 3 December 2009
- Succeeded by: Shaoquett Moselmane

Deputy Lord Mayor of Sydney
- In office 23 September 1991 – 11 September 1999
- Lord Mayor: Frank Sartor
- Preceded by: Ross Bonthorne
- Succeeded by: Lucy Turnbull

Alderman of the City of Sydney
- In office September 1991 – September 1993

Councillor of the City of Sydney
- In office September 1993 – 11 September 1999

Personal details
- Born: 6 November 1942 (age 83) Jiangxi, Republic of China (now Jiangxi Province)
- Party: Australian Labor Party (New South Wales Branch)

Henry Shiu-Lung Tsang OAM (born 6 November 1943; simplified Chinese: 曾筱龙; traditional Chinese: 曾筱龍; pinyin: Zéng Xiǎolóng) is a Chinese-born Australian architect, politician and formerly a Labor Party member of the New South Wales Legislative Council from 1999 until his resignation effective 3 December 2009.

== Early years ==
Tsang was born to parents Tik Fai Tsang and Woon-Wah Young in a Hakka village in Jiangxi Province, China on 6 November 1943. In 1949 Tsang and his family fled to Hong Kong as refugees. He grew up in Hong Kong but emigrated to Australia in 1961. After arriving in Australia, he attended Vaucluse Boys' High School and went on to study at the University of Sydney, obtaining a Bachelor of Architecture in 1961. He undertook further studies at the University of Technology, Sydney and was awarded a Graduate Diploma in Building Science.

He was Senior Vice Chairman of the Ethnic Communities Council of New South Wales from 1987 to 1990. In 1991 he was awarded the Medal of the Order of Australia (OAM) for his services to ethnic communities and received the 2001 Centenary Medal for his "service to the celebration of the Centenary of Federation".

== Political career ==
He was elected to Council of the City of Sydney in September 1991, the first Asian Australian to be elected to that council, and was also elected unopposed as the Deputy Lord Mayor of Sydney. He faced re-election and was re-elected in September 1995 and continued as Deputy Lord Mayor until 1999. He was a Member of Australia's national delegation to the 1992 United Nations Earth Summit. He was also a national delegate to the United Nations World Urban Forum in Curitiba, and he had the honour of chairing the opening session.

He was a member of the Board of Australia-China Council. He was a member of the Multicultural Advisory Committee to the Sydney Organising Committee for the Olympic Games (SOCOG), a Member of the New South Wales Tourism Task Force, and a Member of the Board of Architects of New South Wales, a Member of the Inner Sydney Waste Board and a Member of the Casino Community Benefit Fund Trustees.

He was number eight on the Australian Labor Party ticket for 1999 state election, and despite having a low position on the ticket, was subsequently elected to the council. He was re-elected in 2007.

Tsang served as Parliamentary Secretary to the Premier and to the Treasurer on Trade and Investment until November 2009, when he was replaced by Premier Nathan Rees after he failed to declare gifts and accommodation from Chinese-backed construction group Hightrade.

He was a member of the General Purpose Standing Committee and was the Legislative Council Representative on the Senate of the University of Sydney in 2003 and 2004.

== Personal life ==
He married Donna Pow, a concert pianist, on 10 June 1972.
