= Patricia Staunton =

Australian politician

Patricia Staunton AM

Member of the New South Wales Legislative Council
- In office 25 March 1995 – 2 September 1997

Personal details
- Born: 30 November 1946 (age 79) Townsville, Queensland, Australia
- Party: Labor Party
- Education: University of London
- Profession: Magistrate • Barrister • Registered nurse

Patricia Jane Staunton AM (born 30 November 1946) is an Australian judge and former politician. She was a Labor member of the New South Wales Legislative Council from 1995 to 1997.

Born in Townsville, Queensland, she began her career as a registered nurse, working at Townsville General Hospital and then the Royal Hospital for Women at Paddington in Sydney. She then worked at St. Vincent's Hospital from 1963 to 1969, before leaving for the United Kingdom to study law at the University of London. Staunton graduated in law in London in 1975 and then undertook post-graduate Bar exams at the Inner Temple, and was called to the Bar of England and Wales in 1976. She returned to Australia and was admitted to the Supreme Court of New South Wales as a barrister in 1976, and was in private practice 1976–80. In 1987, she was elected head of the Union of the New South Wales Nurses' Association, and served as Legal Officer (1980–85), Assistant General Secretary (1985–87) and General Secretary (1987–95). She had joined the Labor Party in 1982.

In 1989, Staunton was elected to Sydney City Council, where she served until 1991. In 1995, she was elected to the New South Wales Legislative Council as a Labor member, but resigned to resume her legal career in 1997.

In 1999 she was appointed Chief Magistrate of New South Wales. Staunton also completed a master's degree in criminology at the University of Sydney in 2000. In 2002, Staunton was appointed Deputy President and Judicial Member of the Industrial Court of New South Wales (the NSW Industrial Relations Commission). Staunton retired from the Industrial Court in 2009.

From 2010 until 2012, Staunton was chair of the Board of Justice Health and Forensic Mental Health Network (NSW).

In January 2013, Staunton was appointed as a part-time Deputy President and Member of the NSW Mental Health Review Tribunal.

In 1995, Staunton was made a Member of the Order of Australia for services to Nursing.

She is the original author (and now co-author) of the book "Law for Nurses and Midwives", currently in its seventh edition.
