= Max Willis =

Australian politician (1935–2021)

Brigadier The Honourable Max Willis RFD, ED

President of the New South Wales Legislative Council
- In office 3 July 1991 – 29 June 1998
- Preceded by: Max Willis
- Succeeded by: Meredith Burgmann

Member of New South Wales Legislative Council
- In office 2 September 1970 – 5 March 1999

Personal details
- Born: 6 December 1935 Murwillumbah, New South Wales
- Died: 18 August 2021 (aged 85) Sydney
- Party: Liberal Party
- Spouse: Wendy Patricia Booth
- Occupation: Solicitor

Military service
- Allegiance: Australia
- Branch/service: Australian Army Reserve
- Years of service: 1953–1986
- Rank: Brigadier
- Commands: University of New South Wales Regiment (1972–75)
- Battles/wars: Vietnam War
- Awards: Reserve Force Decoration; Efficiency Decoration; Cross of Solomon Islands (Solomon Islands)

Max Frederick Willis, RFD, ED (6 December 1935 – 18 August 2021) was an Australian politician and senior Army Reserve officer. He was a Liberal member of the New South Wales Legislative Council from 1970 to 1999. His brother Sir Eric Willis was briefly Premier of New South Wales in 1976.

Born in Murwillumbah, Willis was the son of Archibald Clarence Willis, a butter factory hand, and Vida Buttenshaw. He was educated at Murwillumbah High School and then received a Bachelor of Laws from the University of Sydney in 1957. Following his admission as a solicitor in 1958, Willis became a partner with Serisier, Willis and Bowring in Miranda until 1971. On 8 August 1970, he married Wendy Patricia Booth, with whom he had four children.

Willis had joined the Citizen Military Forces in 1953, and was involved in the Army Reserve for thirty years, attaining the rank of brigadier. For his military service, Willis was awarded the Reserve Force Decoration (RFD) and the Efficiency Decoration (ED) by the Australian Government, and the Cross of Solomon Islands (CSI). He was also awarded the Centenary Medal on 1 January 2001, and the National Medal with clasp on 24 October 2001.

In 1970, Willis was appointed to the New South Wales Legislative Council. He was Deputy Leader of the Opposition in the council from 1977 to 1978 and Leader from 1978 to 1981. In 1991, he was elected President of the council, succeeding Johno Johnson, who had been president since 1978. In 1998, Willis was forced to resign as president and from the house when, under the influence of alcohol, he was unable to control proceedings during voting on a motion to dismiss Supreme Court Justice Vince Bruce. He was replaced by Virginia Chadwick and retired from politics in 1999. Willis died in August 2021, aged 85.

Military offices
Preceded by B. N. Nunn	Commanding Officer of the University of New South Wales Regiment; 1972–1975	Succeeded by W. B. Molloy
Parliament of New South Wales
Preceded by Johno Johnson	President of the New South Wales Legislative Council; 1991–1998	Succeeded by Virginia Chadwick
