= Peter Breen (Australian politician) =

Australian politician (born 1947)

Member of the New South Wales Legislative Council
- In office 27 March 1999 – 23 March 2007

Leader of the Renewable Energy Party
- In office 22 March 2016 – 26 March 2018
- Preceded by: Office established
- Succeeded by: Office dissolved

Leader of the Reform the Legal System
- In office 1999–2007
- Preceded by: Office established
- Succeeded by: Office dissolved

Personal details
- Born: 4 November 1947 (age 79) Coonabarabran, New South Wales
- Party: Liberal (1971–1975); Bill of Rights Group (1996); RLS (1999–2006); Labor (2006); Human Rights (2006–2007); Renewable Energy (2016–2018)
- Education: University of Sydney
- Profession: Lawyer

Peter James Breen (born 4 November 1947) is an Australian politician, advisor, and lawyer. Elected at the 1999 New South Wales state election, Breen served as a member of the Legislative Council for eight years, representing his own Reform the Legal System party for most of this time. Breen later worked as an advisor for Senator Ricky Muir in 2014, and was involved in the founding of the Renewable Energy Party. From 2016 to 2018, he served as an advisor to Senator Brian Burston.

== Early life ==
Breen was born as the eldest of eight children in Coonabarabran. At a young age, his family moved to Sydney, at first living in Kingsford before moving to Campbelltown in 1956. In Campbelltown, Breen's family lived in war service housing at the St Elmo Estate, and Breen's father managed the local bowling club. As a child, Breen attended a Catholic primary school and St Gregory's Agricultural College for high school. After graduating St Gregory's, Breen attended St Columba's College, which was then a seminary.

== Career ==
Breen began a legal career as a law clerk in the office of John Marsden. Breen was a solicitor before entering politics, achieving a Diploma of Law from Sydney University. He was originally a member of the Liberal Party, serving as President of the Campbelltown Young Liberals from 1971 to 1972. Breen left the Liberal Party following the 1975 dismissal of Gough Whitlam and subsequent federal election, upset over what he described as a "shady deal" between then-Liberal leader and Prime Minister Malcolm Fraser and Governor-General John Kerr.

Breen worked for Queensland's Electoral and Administrative Review Commission during the early 1990s as a senior projects officer, and assisted with the drafting of a human rights charter. Breen founded the Australian Bill of Rights Group as a political party, serving as its secretary from 1995 to 1998. The group organised with a number of other progressive political parties, including the then-nascent Australian Greens, and ran a joint ticket for the 1997 Australian Constitutional Convention election under the label "Greens, Bill of Rights, Indigenous Peoples". Breen stood as the ticket's second candidate in New South Wales, and the first candidate — Catherine Moore of the Greens — was elected to the convention.

In 1998 Breen joined Reform the Legal System. In the 1999 New South Wales election he was elected to the Legislative Council.

Breen joined the Labor Party on 5 May 2006. At the time, Breen cited a desire to oppose the Howard government's WorkChoices reforms as a key reason for joining Labor. Breen's Labor membership was sponsored by Ian Macdonald and Eddie Obeid, waiving the need for any union or factional membership. Given that Breen's prospects of re-election to the Legislative Council were slim, he hoped to gain Labor preselection in the federal seat of Page. However, Breen resigned from the Labor Party on 18 July. As part of Breen's campaign to overturn the conviction of Stephen 'Shorty' Jamieson in the murder of Janine Balding, he described a "love" that he held for Jamieson in an unpublished book. Morris Iemma, the leader of the Labor Party and Premier of New South Wales, demanded that Breen apologise for the comments. Breen refused, and shortly afterwards resigned from the Labor Party.

Breen was admitted to hospital shortly after his resignation from Labor in July 2006. Breen stayed in St Vincent's Hospital for three days, and had double vision for six weeks, which he attributes in part to the stress of leaving Labor and subsequent hate mail over his defence of Jamieson. He unsuccessfully sought re-election to the Legislative Council at the 2007 New South Wales state election as the lead candidate for the Human Rights Party.

Breen submitted in favour of Phuong Ngo as part of a 2009 inquiry into the evidence used to convict Ngo. Following a finding against Ngo in April 2009, Breen remarked that the legal system "can't afford to allow convicted prisoners to be released", as it would reflect poorly on the legal system as a whole.

In 2014 Breen became an adviser to Senator Ricky Muir of the Australian Motoring Enthusiast Party but was sacked on 5 August 2014.

After the 2016 federal election, a double dissolution in which a number of crossbenchers were elected, Breen was offered a job as an advisor by both Derryn Hinch and Brian Burston. However, the offer from Hinch was withdrawn after Breen's defence for criminals such as Jamieson re-emerged. Despite a number of political differences with the policies of Burston's One Nation party, and the objections of his wife who initially threatened to leave Breen if he worked for One Nation, Breen ultimately agreed to become a senior advisor for Burston.

When Pauline Hanson wore a burqa onto the floor of the Senate in 2017, Breen considered resigning over what he described as a "disgraceful stunt", but hesitated when he learned that the Sydney Morning Herald planned to place his resignation on their front cover. In 2018, Hanson asked Breen to draft a letter asking Burston to resign from his positions within One Nation and the Senate. This letter was read live on air by Ben Fordham on 2GB.

As the rift between Hanson and Burston grew wider, Breen attempted to mediate their dispute, attempting to negotiate a position for Burston atop One Nation's ticket for the Legislative Council at the 2019 New South Wales state election. During this time, Breen considered standing as a candidate for One Nation in the seat of Barwon at the state election, which covered his home town of Coonabarabran, as a protest against unconventional gas mining in the Great Artesian Basin. Breen's wife was incensed at this proposal, which she viewed as both hypocritical and devoid of integrity. However, Breen's time associated with Burston and One Nation would come to an end imminently, as he was fired from Burston's office in June 2018.

=== Renewable Energy Party ===
Renewable Energy Party
- Leader: Peter Breen
- Founded: 22 March 2016
- Dissolved: 26 March 2018
- Preceded by: Human Rights Party
- Headquarters: Byron Bay, New South Wales

In 2016, Breen was a key person in the Renewable Energy Party and candidate for the Australian Senate to represent New South Wales in the Australian federal election.

The Renewable Energy Party was an Australian political party registered by the Australian Electoral Commission on 22 March 2016.

In the 2016 federal election the Renewable Energy Party fielded two senate candidates in each of New South Wales, Queensland, Tasmania, Victoria and Western Australia, and a total of eight candidates for the House of Representatives in Victoria (4), Tasmania (3) and New South Wales (1), none of whom were elected.

On 1 February 2018, the Australian Electoral Commission issued a notice that it was considering deregistering the party on the grounds that it had ceased to have at least 500 members. On 26 March 2018, the party was deregistered due to failure to respond to the earlier notice.
