= Marlene Goldsmith =

Australian politician

Marlene Mary Herbert Goldsmith (29 September 1942 – 13 April 2000) was an Australian politician. She was a Liberal member of the New South Wales Legislative Council.

Marlene Mary Herbert was born in Leeton to parents Esma Mary (née Williams) and wool classer Cecil Vaughan. She received a Commonwealth Scholarship in 1960 and studied to be a teacher, receiving a Bachelor of Arts from the University of New England. She subsequently taught at St. Mary's College, Gunnedah where she was held in high regard. She was then awarded a teaching scholarship to the University of Minnesota in 1978 (and a PhD), and a Thurston Scholarship in Foundations of Education in 1981. She taught in both the United States and in New South Wales, and was also a research consultant. She married Ian Goldsmith, with whom she had a daughter. She was also a branch president of the Liberal Party.

In 1988, Marlene Goldsmith was elected to the New South Wales Legislative Council as a Liberal member. She held her seat until her retirement in 1999. She died from cancer on 13 April 2000. A Requiem mass was held for her at St Canice's Church in Elizabeth Bay on 19 April 2000.

Non-profit organization positions
Preceded by Michael L'Estrange AO	Executive Director of Menzies Research Centre; 1998–2000	Succeeded by John Roskam
