= Outdoor Recreation Party =

Australian minor political party

- President: Peter Whelan
- Chairman: David Leyonhjelm (2011–2017)
- Founded: 1996
- Dissolved: 2017
- Headquarters: New South Wales
- Ideology: To represent the outdoor community and interests
- NSW Legislative Council: 1 / 42 (1999–2007)
- Senate (Note: While David Leyonhjelm was the chairman of the ORP, he was elected and sat as a member of the Liberal Democrats.): 1 / 76 (2014–2017)

Website
- http://www.orp.org.au/

The Outdoor Recreation Party (ORP) was a minor political party originating in New South Wales (NSW), Australia. It professed to represent the outdoor community and interests such as cycling, bushwalking, camping, kayaking, 4WD motoring, skiing, fishing and shooting. It was formally allied with the Liberal Democratic Party.

== History ==
In 1996, Glenn Druery was instrumental in the formation of the ORP in New South Wales, with Malcolm Jones as president. In 1997, ORP contested the Sutherland by-election, in which Druery received 780 primary votes or 2.13% of the total vote.

At the 1999 NSW general election, Druery formulated a strategy by means of which preference votes could be harvested from a large number of small political parties. He negotiated for independent and selected minor-party candidates to adhere to his calculated preference-swapping arrangements. As a result, three minor party candidates were elected to the upper house with very low primary votes, including Malcolm Jones whose share of the primary vote was 0.2%. Jones was forced to resign in 2003 amidst a corruption scandal and an ICAC inquiry into his conduct, and party member Jon Jenkins was appointed to the casual vacancy to serve out the remainder of Jones's 8-year term.

Though the ORP passed the NSW Electoral Office's political party registration process in June 2006, allowing it to contest the 2007 New South Wales state election, Jenkins resigned his seat shortly before the election. The party contested the election on a joint upper house ticket with the Horse Riders Party but was unsuccessful, achieving only 0.6% of the vote.

Amendments to the Parliamentary Electorates and Elections Act 1912 made it much harder for minor political parties to be registered, thus eliminating the type of preference manipulation from which the ORP had previously benefited. In late 2009, the ORP allied itself with the Liberal Democratic Party in NSW to contest the March 2011 state election. This move enabled the ORP to participate in federal elections through the LDP's federal registration and, conversely, the LDP could participate in NSW elections using the ORP name.

In the 2013 federal election, the party chose to appear in the Senate group name Stop The Greens.

In the 2016 federal election, the Outdoor Recreation Party (Stop The Greens) fielded a single House of Representatives candidate in the Division of Forrest.

On 4 July 2017, The Australian Electoral Commission gave notice of its consideration to deregister Outdoor Recreation Party (Stop The Greens) under subsection 137(1)(cb) of the Commonwealth Electoral Act 1918. When the party did not respond to the notice, it was deregistered on 10 August 2017. The party was formally disbanded in late 2017.
