= Franca Arena =

Australian politician and activist

Franca Arena AM

Member of the New South Wales Legislative Council
- In office 27 October 1981 – 5 March 1999

Personal details
- Born: Franca Dellepiane; 23 August 1937 (age 89) Genoa, Italy
- Party: Franca Arena Child Safety Alliance (1999)
- Other political affiliations: Labor (1972–1997); Independent (1997–1999)
- Spouse: Joseph Arena (m. 1961–2017)

Franca Arena (Italian: [ˈfraŋka aˈreːna]; born 23 August 1937) is an Australian politician and activist. She was a Member of the New South Wales Legislative Council from 1981, first for the Labor Party then as an independent from 1997 until she left the Council in 1999. Long recognised as a colourful and influential figure in New South Wales politics, Arena shot to national prominence in 1996 when, under Parliamentary privilege, she named retired judge David Yeldham and former New South Wales MP Frank Arkell as potential paedophiles.

== Life and career ==
Arena was born in Genoa, Italy, the daughter of Francesco Dellepiane and Onorato Rosita. She received her education in Italy, at Syskon College in London, and after migrating to Australia in 1959, took several courses at WEA Sydney. In 1961, Arena married Joseph Nicholas Arena. The couple had twin sons in 1966. Soon after arriving in Australia, Arena worked as a journalist for the Italian language newspaper La Fiamma, until 1966. She also worked as a broadcaster in ethnic radio. In 1975 Arena helped found ethnic radio 2EA Sydney, where she worked until 1979.

Arena's strong interest in ethnic affairs inevitably led her to become involved in community organisations and politics. She sat on numerous committees from 1972 through the 1970s and '80s, all of them involved in some way in promoting or managing ethnic affairs, women's issues, or adult education. She joined the Labor Party in 1972, and in 1981 was elected to the New South Wales Legislative Council, becoming the first woman not from an English-speaking background in the New South Wales Parliament. As a Member of the council, Arena sat on several parliamentary committees, most prominently the Standing Committee on Social Issues.

In 1996 Arena attracted public condemnation after suggesting that the Wood Royal Commission should investigate Supreme Court judge David Yeldham and former MP Frank Arkell as alleged paedophiles. Her relationship with her party became increasingly strained as the fallout from her 1996 comments mounted, and she resigned in November 1997, continuing to serve on the Legislative Council as an independent. In 1999 she failed a bid for re-election under the "Franca Arena Child Safety Alliance" banner, and retired from politics.

The National Italian-Australian Women's Association was established by Franca Arena in 1985 (founding President). It aims to recognise and promote the contribution of Italian-Australian women to Australian society.

Franca Arena has been a volunteer telephone counsellor for Lifeline and is a regular on-air contributor on the SBS Italian radio program.

Her husband, Joseph Arena, died in 2017 after a long fight with Alzeimer's. Franca was interviewed on SBS Italian radio about her husband and his fight with Alzeimer's.

== Awards ==
In 1976, Arena was awarded a Churchill Fellowship, which sponsorship she used to study the relationship between ethnic groups and their host countries in countries other than Australia. She was offered the Order of the British Empire for services to migrants, but refused the honour; in 1980 she accepted the Order of Australia for services to ethnic groups. Australia was not the only government determined to recognise her work; in 1990 she was awarded Commendatore della Repubblica Italiana (in English, Knight Commander of the Italian Republic), and in 2004 the City of Genoa and the Region of Liguria bestowed the Illustrious Ligurian Award.

== Queer nation ==
In 1991, Arena attracted sympathy and scorn after becoming the target of militant homosexual activists Queer Nation. At the time, Arena was the head of a parliamentary enquiry into financial assistance for people who had acquired AIDS medically. Arena attracted the attention of Queer Nation because, according to prominent member Tony Westmore, she had attempted to distinguish between people with medically acquired AIDS (whom she considered "innocent") and people who become infected through sexual contact.

== Election reform ==
In 1995, MLC Franca Arena moved the Parliament to an inquiry and report on the idea of providing seats dedicated to people of Aboriginal background, modeled on the Māori seats of New Zealand, so as to allow for hitherto unseen indigenous representation in the Parliament of New South Wales. The Standing Committee on Social Issues, of which she wasn't part, released a report on the merits of such seats in November 1998. The NSW Government members, however, did not believe the solution appropriate and leaned towards other measures to facilitate Aboriginal representation.

== Wood Royal Commission ==
The Royal Commission into the New South Wales Police Service was a Royal Commission set up in 1994 to investigate corruption in the then New South Wales Police Service. As the commission continued, its scope expanded to include paedophilia and the failure of the NSW Police to adequately investigate accusations of sexual abuse. Arena, along with fellow MP Deirdre Grusovin, urged the commission to look into abuse perpetrated by judges and lawyers.

Frustrated with what she saw as the commission's unwillingness to investigate prominent people, Arena promised to name at least two Sydney men in a speech to the Legislative Council. The next day, she followed through, demanding to know why the commission had not investigated retired Supreme Court judge David Yeldham or former MLA Frank Arkell. The remarks caused uproar in both Parliament and the press, and Arena was regularly accused of abusing Parliamentary privilege to shield herself from potential defamation suits.

Both Arkell and Yeldham strenuously denied being paedophiles. As a result of the publicity Arena's suggestion attracted, Yeldham was discovered to be living a double life as a homosexual, and committed suicide on 4 November 1996. When asked in late 1996 to comment on Yeldham's suicide, Arena stood by her comments to the Legislative Council, explaining, "I asked questions which I felt it was important for me to ask after I was contacted by several people. As a member of Parliament, I have a duty to my constituents. Throughout this whole affair, I have acted according to my conscience.". The Privileges Committee of the Legislative Council investigated Arena's parliamentary conduct in November 1997. Frank Arkell, the other accused, was murdered on 26 June 1998.

When the Commission published its findings, it cleared Yeldham and Arkell of any wrongdoing, and found that Arena's claims of a high-level cover-up of paedophilic activity were "false in all respects". Journalist Trudy Harris, writing in The Australian, described some of her claims, including one that an unnamed NSW judge was a Satanic murderer, as "bizarre". Not all of Arena's efforts were dismissed, however: NSW Commissioner of Police Peter Ryan set up a strike force to investigate accusations Arena supplied to NSW Police, and argued that her assistance had been invaluable at times, such as in the arrest of a NSW District Court judge for child sex offences.

== Leaving the Labor Party ==
The decision to name Arkell and Yeldham as suspected paedophiles would cost Arena dearly. With support within her own party already waning as a result of the incident and her refusal to back down, in 1997 Arena pushed things further, crossing the floor to vote with the Liberal Opposition in favour of widening the Wood Commission's jurisdiction to include all paedophilia-related activity. Voting against one's own party is an expellable offence in the Labor Party; the only other NSW Labor MP to have opposed his own party in a party-line vote was George Petersen, who was expelled in 1987 as a result.

As debate on whether to expel Arena continued within the Labor Party and in the press, the Wood Royal Commission released its findings, clearing Arena's accused and ridiculing her allegations of a political cover-up. Arena resigned from the Australian Labor Party on 7 November 1997, but continued to serve the Legislative Council as an independent.

== As an independent ==
Arena wasted no time in using her new-found freedom as an independent. In November 1997, the Labor Government attempted to pass the Drug Misuse and Trafficking Amendment Bill, which would have reduced the fine for small-scale marijuana use from $2200 to $500, and removed the possibility of gaol time. Arena opposed the Bill, which was defeated in a 20–19 vote in the Legislative Council. Another Independent MLC, Richard Jones, attacked Arena for her opposition of the Bill, asserting that she had told him she would be supporting it; Arena argued that she had changed her mind because similar legislation had failed in South Australia.

As Arena's eight-year term drew to a close, the Legislative Council voted to suspend her indefinitely unless she apologised for her comments about a criminal conspiracy of politicians to cover-up paedophilia. Arena refused to apologise, arguing that she hadn't made any statements alleging criminal conspiracies. She read a "statement of regret" to the Council instead, a compromise that angered the Government but attracted enough support from Independents and individual Coalition MPs to avoid suspension.

Arena stood for re-election in 1999 under the name of a new party, the "Franca Arena Child Safety Alliance". She was soundly defeated, receiving a mere 0.4 percent of the popular vote, and immediately announced her retirement from political life.

== As an author ==
In 2002, Arena published an autobiography entitled, Franca: my story. In it, she describes how finding out that both her sons are gay sparked a deep depression, during which she contemplated suicide.
