= Reform the Legal System =

Former political party in New South Wales, Australia

Reform the Legal System Human Rights Party
- Leader: Peter Breen
- Founded: 1999
- Dissolved: 2007
- Succeeded by: Renewable Energy Party

Reform the Legal System, later known as the Human Rights Party, was a political party in New South Wales. It was largely associated with MLC Peter Breen, its leader, who was elected in the 1999 state election. The party was renamed the "Human Rights Party" after Breen's brief membership of the Labor Party in 2006. Breen was defeated at the 2007 state election.

The party was registered for federal elections as "Peter Breen – Reform The Legal System" from 30 November 2000 to 15 November 2002.

At the 2003 New South Wales state election, Reform the Legal System stood Ahmed Sokarno for the Legislative Council, who was noted at the time for his Muslim faith. Sokarno founded Australia's first bilingual Arabic and English newspaper, and was a sports broadcaster for the Special Broadcasting Service at the time. The Reform the Legal System ticket in the Legislative Council, led by Sokarno, received 9,644 votes at the 2003 state election, or 0.26% of the statewide vote. The strongest level of support was recorded in Bankstown, where 366 voters (1.02%) voted for Reform the Legal System in the Legislative Council.

== See also ==
- Australian Equality Party (Marriage)
- Dignity Party (South Australia)
- Drug Law Reform Australia
- Human rights in Australia
- Law of Australia
- Legalise Cannabis Australia
- Voluntary Euthanasia Party
