= Charlie Lynn =

Australian politician

The Honourable Charlie Lynn OAM

Member of Legislative Council of New South Wales
- In office 19 October 1995 – 6 March 2015

Personal details
- Born: 14 January 1945 (age 81) Orbost, Victoria
- Party: Liberal Party
- Website: charlielynn.com.au

Military service
- Allegiance: Australia
- Branch/service: Australian Army
- Years of service: 1965–1986
- Rank: Major
- Battles/wars: Vietnam War

Charlie John Stuart Lynn OAM (born 14 January 1945 in Orbost, Victoria) is an Australian former politician who served as a Liberal Party member of the New South Wales Legislative Council between 1995 and 2015.

== Background and early career ==
Charlie Lynn was born to parents Melva and Keith Lynn, and is the eldest of eight siblings.

Following his discharge from the Army, became a Special Events Organiser. He has organised the Sydney to Melbourne Ultra Marathon, the Anzac Day Marathon, the 18,000 kilometres (11,000 mi) Round Australia Relay for the Australian Cancer Foundation, the Great Australian Caravan Safari, the Darwin-Cairns-Melbourne Relay for the Melbourne Olympic Committee, and the international George Street Mile footrace. He was a Consultant to Australian Rural Leadership Foundation and also a Facilitator for Adventure West Leadership and Survival Training activities.

He was a Trek Leader for Adventure Kokoda and a developer of the Kokoda Youth Leadership Challenge. A keen fun-runner, Lynn was placed second in the Bathurst Centenary 100-kilometre (62 mi) ultramarathon in 1986, with a time of 8 hours 26 minutes. He held the New South Wales 24-hour Ultra Marathon record in 1985–86, with a distance of 213 kilometres (132 mi). He completed the first Triple M Ironman Triathlon in a time of 13 hours and 12 minutes.

He was Chairman of the Campbelltown Chamber of Commerce and Industry between 1993 and 1994. He has also served as the Vice-President of Camden Branch (1994–95), President Macarthur FEC (1998–2000) for the Liberal Party, Patron of the Vietnam Veterans Reconstitution Group, Patron of Communities for Communities, NSW, and Corrective and Emergency Services Committee (1995)

== Political career ==
Lynn's first attempt at parliament was at the 1991 NSW election where he was the Liberal candidate for the safe Labor seat of Campbelltown and was unsuccessful although he achieved a swing toward the Liberal Party. Lynn the stood as the Liberal candidate for at seat in the Australian Parliament at the Werriwa by-election of January 1994 in which his Labor opponent was future Opposition Leader Mark Latham. Werriwa was a safe Labor seat and Latham was elected although Lynn again succeeded in achieving a swing for the Liberal Party.

Lynn came close to being elected to Australian Parliament when he was preselected as the Liberal candidate for the marginal Labor seat of Macarthur. However, former NSW Liberal Premier John Fahey was identified as an alternate candidate to Lynn. But Lynn initially refused to step aside for Fahey. A deal was brokered to accommodate both Fahey and Lynn when former State Liberal Minister Ted Pickering retired from State Parliament. Lynn filled Pickering's Legislative Council seat in return for giving up the Macarthur preselection for Fahey. Lynn accepted the deal and Fahey went on to win Macarthur at the 1996 federal election.

Lynn was appointed to the casual vacancy in the Legislative Council on 19 October 1995 following the resignation of Pickering on 10 October and served until his retirement in 2015. He first stood for election in his own right in the 1999 New South Wales election. He was placed fourth on the joint Liberal/Nationals election ticket and was re-elected after receiving the ninth highest quota of votes. He was appointed Parliamentary Secretary for Veterans Affairs under Premiers Barry O'Farrell and Mike Baird from 2011–2015. In 2018 he was awarded an OAM for his services to the people of NSW and the NSW Parliament.

He was nominated for an Ernie Award in 2000 for saying "I'm not happy about someone else having my credit card details, it's bad enough that my wife has them." In 2003, Lynn under parliamentary privilege made an allegation that a senior minister, who he did not name, in the Carr Labor Government sexually assaulted a 15-year-old boy. The allegation was immediately dismissed by Premier Bob Carr and the unnamed minister was cleared of this accusation.

Lynn stood for re-election in 2007 New South Wales election. He was placed first on the joint Liberal/Nationals election ticket. He was re-elected after receiving the second highest quota of votes. On 28 July 2012 Lynn threatened he would be leaving the Liberal Party to sit in the Legislative Council as an independent over concerns about the selection of candidates for upcoming local council elections in NSW being endorsed by the Liberal Party. The party chose not to endorse their members in that local council area, as has been practice in the past in some areas. During 2014 Lynn announced that he would not contest the 2015 state election.

During his term in Parliament, Lynn served as a member of the Joint Select Committee into the Transportation and Storage of Nuclear Waste, General Purposes Standing Committees, Select Committee on the Continued Public Ownership of Snowy Hydro Limited, Committee on the Office of the Ombudsman and the Police Integrity Commission, Standing Committee on Social Issues and Committee on the Office of the Valuer-General.

== Later life ==
Lynn was appointed to the Board of the Kokoda Track Memorial Walkway at Concord.

In June 2020, Lynn declared he would cease his membership of Greater Western Sydney Giants AFL club in protest at players kneeling on one knee in an anti-racism demonstration before their clash against North Melbourne.
