= Jenny Gardiner =

Australian politician

The Honourable Jenny Gardiner

Member of Legislative Council of New South Wales
- In office 25 May 1991 – 6 March 2015

Deputy President of the Legislative Council
- In office 3 May 2011 – 5 May 2015
- Preceded by: Kayee Griffin
- Succeeded by: Trevor Khan

Deputy Leader of the Nationals in the Legislative Council
- In office 31 March 2003 – 6 March 2015

Personal details
- Born: Jennifer Ann Gardiner; 16 October 1950 (age 76) Penola, South Australia
- Party: The Nationals

Jennifer Ann Gardiner (born 16 October 1950) is an Australian politician and former Nationals member of the New South Wales Legislative Council from 1991 to 2015.

== Early years ==
Gardiner was born in Penola, South Australia. She attended primary school in Victoria. Her secondary education was undertaken in Victoria and then in New South Wales.

After leaving school, she obtained a Bachelor of Business through the Mitchell College of Advanced Education in Bathurst, New South Wales, now part of Charles Sturt University.

== National Party political activity ==
Gardiner commenced her working life as a junior clerk working in a legal office in Tamworth where she played an active role in the Young Australian Country Party – NSW (YACP – NSW) – the NSW youth branch of the Party now known as the Young Nationals. Gardiner worked her way up to become State Secretary of the YACP – NSW and was elected as a delegate to the Central Council of the Australian Country Party – NSW in the mid-1970s. Gardiner moved to Sydney and began work at the New South Wales headquarters of the then Australian Country Party as a research officer working under the leadership of Colonel Bill Ford OBE, general secretary and then as Executive Officer to Charles Blunt, general secretary. She was eventually to become the General Secretary of the NSW Branch of the National Party of Australia between 1984 and 1991 and the first woman to hold that position.

During her term as General Secretary of the NSW National Party, at the request of the National Party Federal Leader, Doug Anthony, Gardiner undertook an analysis of the implications of a Hawke Labor Government proposal in 1984 to increase the number of Members in the Australian House of Representatives. The Opposition Coalition was formally opposed to the proposal. Gardiner's analysis indicated that the National Party could benefit from an expanded House and National Party Senators crossed the floor to vote with Labor in support of the motion. Gardiner was also influential in persuading the Liberal Party to avoid three-cornered contests in country NSW seats.

During the failed 1987 Joh for Canberra campaign to install Sir Joh Bjelke-Petersen as prime minister, in a highly unusual move for a paid party official, Gardiner issued a media release critical of the Queensland National Party. Gardiner was general secretary when the NSW National Party achieved its most successful post-WWII outcome at the NSW general elections held on 19 March 1988 when the party won 20 out of 26 seats contested in the Legislative Assembly that swept the Unsworth Labor Government from office.

In an unpublished manuscript, Gardiner has written about the history of the NSW Young Nationals.

== New South Wales state political career ==
Gardiner was elected to the New South Wales Legislative Council on 25 May 1991 replacing the Honourable Judy Jakins, MLC. She was re-elected to the Council in both 1999 and 2007 and had the fifth highest quota in both elections. She was number two on the Liberal/Nationals election ticket and since 31 March 2003 was the Deputy Leader of The Nationals in the Legislative Council.

In Parliament, she served on the following committees:

- General Purpose Standing Committee 2
- Privileges Committee
- Procedure Committee
- Committee on the Independent Commission Against Corruption (2003–2007)
- Temporary Chair of Committees (2003–2007)
- Select Committee on Electoral and Political Party Funding (2007–2008)
- Joint Select Committee Upon Gun Law Reform (1991) that drafted gun control laws

On 16 February 2014 Gardiner announced she would be retiring at the 2015 election.

Gardiner served on the Advisory Council for Charles Sturt University between 1991 and 1995.

New South Wales Legislative Council
Preceded by Kayee Griffin	Deputy President; 2011–2015	Succeeded by Trevor Khan
