= Andy Manson =

Scottish-born Australian politician and orator

Andrew Bruce Manson (23 March 1936 – 22 December 2009) is a former Australian politician and orator. Born in Scotland, he was on national service for three months before two years in the Reserves. A carpenter, he was active in the trade union movement. In 1957, he married Jacqueline, with whom he has two sons and a daughter.

In 1963, Manson joined the Labor Party, and was a delegate to the Annual Conference every year from 1964 to 1992. He held various party positions, including a member of the Administrative Committee (1977–1988), the Industrial Committee (1980–1988) and a National Conference Proxy Delegate (1986, 1988). In 1988, he was elected to the New South Wales Legislative Council for the party, and was appointed Deputy Government Whip in 1999. He resigned from the House on 27 October 2000 and was replaced by Ian West.
