= Brian Pezzutti =

Australian politician and Australian Army officer (born 1947)

Brian Pezzutti AM, CSC, RFD

Member of Legislative Council of New South Wales
- In office 19 March 1988 – 28 February 2003

Personal details
- Born: 6 January 1947 (age 79) Casino, New South Wales
- Party: Liberal Party
- Spouse: Dr Christine Jillian Spence

Military service
- Allegiance: Australia
- Branch/service: Australian Army Reserve
- Years of service: 1965–2017
- Rank: Brigadier
- Battles/wars: Gulf War; Rwanda (UNAMIR); International Force for East Timor
- Awards: Conspicuous Service Cross; Reserve Force Decoration

Brian Patrick Victor Pezzutti, AM, CSC, RFD (Italian: [petˈtsutti]; born 6 January 1947) is a former Australian politician and Australian Army officer. Born in Casino, New South Wales, he was the son of Victor Dominic Pezzutti and Helena Hilda Bazzo. He was an army reservist in 1965 and later became active in the armed forces; he received the National Medal in 1978. On 23 February 1976 he married Christine Jillian Spence, with whom he has two daughters and two sons.

Pezzutti was trained as a medical practitioner and is a specialist anaesthetist. He joined the Liberal Party and was the foundation president of the Lismore Branch, serving from 1983 until 1990. He has been vice-president since this time. In 1988, he was elected to the New South Wales Legislative Council, on which he served until his retirement in 2003. While an MLC, he served in the Gulf War (1991), Bougainville (1995, 1998) and East Timor (1999). He was also Brigadier Assistant Surgeon General of the Australian Defence Forces from 2000 to 2004.

== Honours and awards ==

| Ribbon | Description | Notes |
| | Member of the Order of Australia (AM) | (26 January 2024) |
| Ribbon for the CSC | Conspicuous Service Cross (CSC) | (26 January 2009) |
| Ribbon for the AASM | Australian Active Service Medal | with EAST TIMOR clasp |
| Ribbon for the INTERFET Medal | International Force East Timor Medal | (1999) |
| Ribbon for the ASM | Australian Service Medal | with RWANDA clasp (1995) |
| Ribbon for the Centenary Medal | Centenary Medal | (1 January 2001) |
| Ribbon for the RFD with 3 Rosettes | Reserve Force Decoration with 3 Rosettes (RFD) | For 30–34 years of service (1986) |
| Ribbon for the National Medal | National Medal | For 15 years national service (16 October 1980) |
| Ribbon for the ADM | Australian Defence Medal | (2006) |
| Ribbon for the National Service Medal | Anniversary of National Service 1951-1972 Medal | (2002) |

Additional awards:

- New South Wales Government Meritorious Award for Tsunami Assistance (2005)
- Paul Harris Fellow – Rotary International (2006)
