= Malcolm Jones (politician) =

Australian politician (born 1946)

The Honourable Malcolm Jones

Member of the NSW Legislative Council
- In office 27 March 1999 – 16 September 2003
- Succeeded by: Jon Jenkins

Personal details
- Born: 25 August 1946 (age 80) Chester, United Kingdom
- Party: Outdoor Recreation Party (1995 onwards)
- Other political affiliations: Liberal Party (until 1995)
- Spouse: Vivien
- Children: 3

Malcolm Irving Jones (born 25 August 1946) is a former Australian politician. Born in Chester, England, to Philip and Lena Mary Jones, he immigrated to Australia in 1974. He was an employee benefits consultant with his own company from 1981 to 1994. In 1983, he married Vivien, with whom he had a daughter and two sons.

Jones was originally a member of the Liberal Party, serving as Branch President and Secretary of the Balgowlah Branch from 1994 to 1995. He was also a member of the Four Wheel Drive Association from 1994, and in 1995 left the Liberal Party to join the Outdoor Recreation Party.

In 1999, the ORP joined the Minor Party Alliance and as a result of preference deals with other parties, Jones with 7264 primary votes was elected on preferences to the New South Wales Legislative Council. He was forced to resign on 16 September 2003 amidst a corruption scandal and an ICAC inquiry into his conduct. Party member Jon Jenkins was appointed to the casual vacancy to serve out the remainder of Jones' 8-year term.
