= Meredith Burgmann =

Australian politician

The Honourable Meredith Burgmann AM

President of the New South Wales Legislative Council
- In office 11 May 1999 – 2 March 2007

Member of Legislative Council of New South Wales
- In office 25 May 1991 – 23 March 2007

Personal details
- Born: 26 July 1947 (age 79) Beecroft, New South Wales, Australia
- Party: Labor Party
- Spouse: Glen Batchelor (m. 1985; div. 1990)
- Relations: Verity (sister)
- Children: 1 (m)
- Education: Sydney University (BA, MA), Macquarie University (PhD)
- Occupation: Academic

Meredith Anne Burgmann AM (born 26 July 1947) is an Australian politician and Labor Party member and a former President of the New South Wales Legislative Council.

== Early years ==
Burgmann was born in July 1947 at Beecroft, New South Wales to parents Victor Dudley Burgmann (son of Canberra Anglican bishop Ernest Henry Burgmann) and Lorna Constance Bradbury. Her late father was a chairman of the CSIRO. Her sister is Verity Burgmann.

She attended Blackfriars Correspondence School and Abbotsleigh School in Sydney, where she was headgirl.

She attended Sydney University and obtained a Bachelor of Arts in 1969, majoring in English and Government. She continued her studies at the university and obtained a Master of Arts in 1973 specialising in Foreign Policy. In 1981 she completed her doctorate on Industrial Relations at Macquarie University. She became the first female President of the National Tertiary Education Union.

Burgmann joined the Australian Labor Party in 1971. She was involved in the Industrial Relations Committee between 1990 and 1995, the Foreign Affairs Committee between 1986 and 1990, as well as being a delegate to the Sydney Federal Executive Council. She was a Member of the New South Wales Labor Council between 1978 and 1991 and also of the ACTU Congress between 1983 and 1989.

She was a tutor and lecturer at Macquarie University from 1974, and became a senior lecturer at Macquarie University in 1989 and remained in that role until 1991. She taught Industrial Relations and Politics.

In 1985 she married Glen Batchelor and they have one son. Batchelor and Burgmann divorced in 1990.

== Political career ==
Some of her first forays into politics have been as an activist. She has been arrested 21 times and spent time in prison for running onto the Sydney Cricket Ground in 1971 during the Springboks tour. She states she is the only person sent to prison for running onto a sporting field during a major sporting event.

She was elected to the New South Wales Legislative Council on 25 May 1991. As an upper house member of parliament, she served as the chair on the Parliamentary Privileges and Ethics Committee. In that committee, she led an inquiry into certain paedophile conspiracy allegations made by the former politician Franca Arena. It was generally acknowledged that the committee observed procedural fairness during that inquiry and that her time as a politician has shown her to be an "independent and intellectual member" of the New South Wales Parliament.

On 8 April 1999, she was elected as the President of the Council to replace the retiring President Virginia Chadwick. She was elected as President of the council on 11 May.

As President, she continued to reduce the size and the scale of the traditional opening of State Parliament. For the 1999 opening, she axed the 29-gun salute and she invited just three ambassadors, one from Thailand and the other two from Cuba and Vietnam. That was criticised for being left leaning since the last two nations have communist governments. She further angered monarchists by ordering the removal of the Queen's portrait from the President's Office and replacing it with an Aboriginal dot painting.

She retired as president on 27 March 2007, at the expiry of her term as a member of the council. She is the longest serving female presiding officer in Australia.

She is aunt to the comedian Charles Firth and to former New South Wales Minister for Education and Training, Minister for Climate Change and the Environment and Minister for Women, Verity Firth.

== Later life ==
In the September 2008 New South Wales Council elections, Burgmann ran for the positions of Lord Mayor and councillor in the City of Sydney Council. She was defeated in the mayoral ballot by incumbent Lord Mayor Clover Moore, becoming Labor's only councillor on the council. She retired from the council in 2012. Burgmann is also a Consultant to the United Nations Development Program.

Burgmann was made a Member of the Order of Australia in the 2020 Australia Day Honours for "significant service to the people and Parliament of New South Wales."

Burgmann was an Ambassador for the Sydney Swans from 2005 until 2018. Burgmann was the President of the Australian Council for International Development, the peak body for the Australian NGO international aid and development sector, from 2008 until 2012.

== Publications ==
In 1993, Burgmann started the Ernie Awards to draw attention to comments regarded as misogynist, and in 2007 published with Yvette Andrews The Ernies Book: 1000 Terrible Things Australian Men Have Said About Women. She has also published articles on industrial, environmental and Aboriginal rights issues.

In 1998 Burgmann and her sister Verity wrote Green Bans, Red Union: Environmental Activism and the New South Wales Builders Labourers' Federation.
