= Jan Burnswoods =

Australian politician

Janice Carolyn Burnswoods

Member of the New South Wales Legislative Council
- In office 1991–2007

Personal details
- Born: 29 December 1943 (age 82)
- Party: Labor
- Education: University of Melbourne
- Occupation: Politician; academic; educator

Janice Carolyn Burnswoods (born 29 December 1943) is a former Australian politician. She received a Bachelor of Arts and a Diploma of Education from the University of Melbourne, and was later employed at the University of Melbourne, the University of New South Wales and the history unit of the New South Wales Department of Education.

In 1972, she joined the Labor Party at Drummoyne, and was a founder and secretary of the Drummoyne Residents' Action Group during the 1970s. She was an Officer of the New South Wales Labor Women's Committee from 1977 to 1986 and an executive member of the New South Wales Teachers' Federation 1986–1991. Burnswoods unsuccessfully sought preselection as the Labor candidate for the 1982 Lowe federal by-election.

In 1991, she was elected to the New South Wales Legislative Council as a Labor member, serving until her retirement in 2007.
