= Richard Jones (New South Wales politician, born 1940) =

Australian politician

Member of the New South Wales Legislative Council
- In office 13 March 1988 – 28 February 2003
- Preceded by: The Hon. Dr. Elisabeth Wilma Kirkby
- Succeeded by: Arthur Chesterfield-Evans

Chairman and inaugural leader of Friends of the Earth Australia
- In office 1974–?

Personal details
- Born: 16 February 1940 (age 86) Epsom, Surrey, England, United Kingdom
- Party: Independent (after 1996)
- Other political affiliations: Democrats (until 1996)

Richard Stanley Leigh Jones (born 16 February 1940) was a member of the New South Wales Legislative Council from 13 March 1988 to 28 February 2003.

== Personal life and political career ==
Born in Epsom, Surrey, England, educated at Downsend School and Epsom College, he emigrated to Australia in 1965. He joined the Australia Party in 1971 and later the Australian Democrats, and was elected twice to the parliament as a Democrats candidate. He left the party in 1996 whilst still a sitting member and turned Independent, after endorsing Australian Labor Party candidates in the 1996 Australian federal election.

== Green politics ==
He was the first convenor of Friends of the Earth Australia and assisted in the founding of Greenpeace in Australia. During his time in parliament, he voiced concern about environmental issues, including destruction of sand dunes at Myall Lakes.

Beyond his dedication to green politics and animal rights issues, he was also a vigorous proponent of alternative medicine; speaking several times in parliament in favour of homoeopathy and traditional Chinese medicine.

== See also ==
- Members of the New South Wales Legislative Council, 1999-2003
