= Alan Corbett =

Australian politician

Alan Gordon Corbett (born 6 April 1954) is an Australian former politician.

== Background ==
Originally a teacher, he was the founder of A Better Future for Our Children, a New South Wales political party.

== Political career ==
At the 1995 New South Wales state election, Corbett was elected to the New South Wales Legislative Council for that party despite receiving only 1.24% of the vote. He served until his retirement in 2003. The party did not contest the state election of that year.

In the late 2010s, Corbett publicly criticised the Queensland Government for not completely banning the use of corporal punishment, with private schools still legally permitted to use the cane. Corbett said that despite Independent Schools Queensland insisting corporal punishment wasn't utilised in their schools anymore, the possibility would always remain that it could be re-introduced at any time while it was still legal under section 280 of the Queensland Criminal Code.

In June 2024, Corbett announced he would be running as an independent candidate in the 2024 Queensland state election, contesting the seat of Bundaberg. He was unsuccessful.

== Personal life ==
Corbett has one son. His wife died in 2017 at the age of 51 after suffering from a long illness.
