= Helen Sham-Ho =

Australian politician

Helen Sham-Ho OAM
- 何沈慧霞

Member of the New South Wales Legislative Council
- In office 19 March 1988 – 28 February 2003

Personal details
- Born: 9 September 1943 (age 82) British Hong Kong
- Party: Independent (1998–2003)
- Other political affiliations: Liberal Party (1982–1998)

Helen Wai-Har Sham-Ho OAM (Chinese: 何沈慧霞; pinyin: Hé Shěn Huìxiá) (born 9 September 1943) is a Hong Kong-born former Australian politician.

== Early life and education ==
Of Bao'an Hakka ancestry, Sham-Ho was born in Hong Kong. She migrated to Australia in 1961, married an Australian in 1964, and became a citizen in 1968.

She earned a Bachelor of Arts and a Diploma of Social Work from the University of Sydney, graduating in 1967, and earned an LL.B. at Macquarie University.

Her first marriage produced two daughters; her second marriage was to Robert Ho on 15 December 1987. In 1982, she had joined the Epping Branch of the Liberal Party.

== Political career ==
In 1988, she was elected to the New South Wales Legislative Council for the Liberal Party. She was the first ethnic Chinese person to be elected to an Australian parliament. She continued as a Liberal MLC until 1998, when she resigned from the party to sit as an independent. She retired before the 2003 election.

== Community service ==
Since her retirement she has been involved in various fund-raising activities in her local community. Sham-Ho is a long-time advocate for Chinese unification, has advised the Australian chapter of the China Council for the Promotion of Peaceful National Reunification, and has been involved with various events linked to the Chinese Communist Party's United Front Work Department.
