= Electoral results for the district of Camden =

Election results for Camden, New South Wales, Australia

Camden, an electoral district of the Legislative Assembly in the Australian state of New South Wales, has had two incarnations, from 1859 to 1920 and from 1981.

Election	Member	Party	Member	Party		
1859	Henry Oxley	None	William Wild	None		
1860	John Morrice	None	John Douglas	None		
1861 by	John Morrice	None	David Bell	None		
1864–65	John Morrice	None	Richard Roberts	None		
1869–70	John Morrice	None	Arthur Onslow	None		
1872	Thomas Garrett	None	Arthur Onslow	None		
1874–75	Thomas Garrett	None	Arthur Onslow	None		
1877	Thomas Garrett	None	Arthur Onslow	None		
1880	Thomas Garrett	None	John Kidd	None		
1882	Thomas Garrett	None	William McCourt	None		
1885	Thomas Garrett	None	John Kidd	None		
1887	Thomas Garrett	Free Trade	William McCourt	Free Trade	Member	Party
1889	Thomas Garrett	Free Trade	William McCourt	Free Trade	John Kidd	Protectionist
1891	William Cullen	Free Trade	William McCourt	Free Trade	John Kidd	Protectionist
1894	John Kidd	Protectionist				
1895	Charles Bull	Free Trade				
1898	John Kidd	Protectionist				
1901	John Kidd	Progressive				
1904	Fred Downes	Liberal Reform				
1907	Fred Downes	Liberal Reform				
1913	John Hunt	Liberal Reform				
1917	John Hunt	Nationalist				
Election	Member	Party				
1981	Ralph Brading	Labor				
1984	John Fahey	Liberal				
1988	Peter Primrose	Labor				
1991	Liz Kernohan	Liberal				
1995	Liz Kernohan	Liberal				
1999	Liz Kernohan	Liberal				
2003	Geoff Corrigan	Labor				
2007	Geoff Corrigan	Labor				
2011	Chris Patterson	Liberal				
2015	Chris Patterson	Liberal				
2019	Peter Sidgreaves	Liberal				
2023	Sally Quinnell	Labor				

== Election results ==
=== Elections in the 2020s ===
==== 2023 ====
2023 New South Wales state election: Camden
Party	Candidate	Votes	%	±%
Labor	Sally Quinnell	21,945	40.6	+11.2
Liberal	Peter Sidgreaves	19,686	36.4	−5.7
One Nation	Garry Dollin	7,437	13.8	+0.4
Greens	Emily Rivera	3,136	5.8	+1.7
Sustainable Australia	Jessie Bijok	1,868	3.5	+2.2
Total formal votes		54,072	96.3	0.0
Informal votes		2,056	3.7	+0.0
Turnout		56,128	90.7	+3.8
Two-party-preferred result
Labor	Sally Quinnell	25,060	53.0	+10.3
Liberal	Peter Sidgreaves	22,222	47.0	−10.3
Labor gain from Liberal		Swing	+10.3	

=== Elections in the 2010s ===
==== 2019 ====
2019 New South Wales state election: Camden
Party	Candidate	Votes	%	±%
Liberal	Peter Sidgreaves	26,999	43.01	−18.34
Labor	Sally Quinnell	18,886	30.09	+2.87
One Nation	Ben Casey	8,330	13.27	+13.27
Independent	Andrew Simpson	4,048	6.45	+6.45
Greens	Karen Stewart	2,359	3.76	−1.54
Keep Sydney Open	Daniel Aragona	1,432	2.28	+2.28
Sustainable Australia	Danica Sajn	718	1.14	+1.14
Total formal votes		62,772	96.14	−0.26
Informal votes		2,520	3.86	+0.26
Turnout		65,292	92.75	−0.35
Two-party-preferred result
Liberal	Peter Sidgreaves	29,556	57.56	−10.72
Labor	Sally Quinnell	21,796	42.44	+10.72
Liberal hold		Swing	−10.72	

==== 2015 ====
2015 New South Wales state election: Camden
Party	Candidate	Votes	%	±%
Liberal	Chris Patterson	29,545	61.4	−2.8
Labor	Cindy Cagney	13,105	27.2	+4.5
Greens	Danica Sajn	2,551	5.3	−0.2
No Land Tax	Mario Tabone	1,513	3.1	+3.1
Christian Democrats	Colin Broadbridge	1,440	3.0	−0.1
Total formal votes		48,154	96.4	+0.4
Informal votes		1,800	3.6	−0.4
Turnout		49,954	93.1	+6.3
Two-party-preferred result
Liberal	Chris Patterson	30,693	68.3	−4.5
Labor	Cindy Cagney	14,258	31.7	+4.5
Liberal hold		Swing	−4.5	

==== 2011 ====
2011 New South Wales state election: Camden
Party	Candidate	Votes	%	±%
Liberal	Chris Patterson	27,847	60.5	+21.9
Labor	Geoff Corrigan	12,115	26.3	−18.5
Greens	Danica Sajn	2,748	6.0	+0.8
Family First	Domenic Zappia	1,954	4.2	+4.2
Christian Democrats	Colin Broadbridge	1,385	3.0	−0.8
Total formal votes		46,049	96.4	−0.4
Informal votes		1,716	3.6	+0.4
Turnout		47,765	94.8	
Two-party-preferred result
Liberal	Chris Patterson	29,363	68.9	+22.8
Labor	Geoff Corrigan	13,279	31.1	−22.8
Liberal gain from Labor		Swing	+22.8	

=== Elections in the 2000s ===
==== 2007 ====
2007 New South Wales state election: Camden
Party	Candidate	Votes	%	±%
Labor	Geoff Corrigan	18,658	44.8	−5.3
Liberal	Chris Patterson	16,071	38.6	+3.8
Greens	Allen Powell	2,150	5.2	+0.4
Christian Democrats	Judy Morris	1,578	3.8	+3.7
AAFI	Chris Bowen	1,228	2.9	+0.7
Independent	Katryna Thirup	1,131	2.7	+2.7
Independent	Leon Belgrave	503	1.2	+1.2
Independent	Chris Buchtmann	346	0.8	+0.8
Total formal votes		41,665	96.8	−0.5
Informal votes		1,366	3.2	+0.5
Turnout		43,031	94.4	
Two-party-preferred result
Labor	Geoff Corrigan	20,333	53.9	−4.8
Liberal	Chris Patterson	17,370	46.1	+4.8
Labor hold		Swing	−4.8	

==== 2003 ====
2003 New South Wales state election: Camden
Party	Candidate	Votes	%	±%
Labor	Geoff Corrigan	23,227	46.8	+9.4
Liberal	Paul Masina	18,510	37.3	−6.4
Greens	Allen Powell	2,461	5.0	+0.9
Independent	Eva Campbell	2,364	4.8	+4.8
Independent	Cindy Cagney	947	1.9	+1.9
AAFI	Max Brazenall	877	1.8	+0.3
One Nation	George Diamantes	803	1.6	−7.4
Democrats	Craig Digby	484	1.0	+1.0
Total formal votes		49,673	97.2	−0.4
Informal votes		1,434	2.8	+0.4
Turnout		51,107	93.4	
Two-party-preferred result
Labor	Geoff Corrigan	24,651	55.4	+8.9
Liberal	Paul Masina	19,814	44.6	−8.9
Labor gain from Liberal		Swing	+8.9	

=== Elections in the 1990s ===
==== 1999 ====
1999 New South Wales state election: Camden
Party	Candidate	Votes	%	±%
Liberal	Liz Kernohan	18,566	43.7	−6.4
Labor	Alex Sanchez	15,888	37.4	−0.6
One Nation	Oscar Rosso	3,809	9.0	+9.0
Greens	Allen Powell	1,762	4.1	+1.2
Independent	Greg Frawley	1,624	3.8	+3.8
AAFI	Max Brazenall	646	1.5	+1.5
Non-Custodial Parents	Jason Thompson	172	0.4	+0.4
Total formal votes		42,467	97.5	+1.8
Informal votes		1,067	2.5	−1.8
Turnout		43,534	94.3	
Two-party-preferred result
Liberal	Liz Kernohan	20,006	53.5	−2.2
Labor	Alex Sanchez	17,393	46.5	+2.2
Liberal hold		Swing	−2.2	

==== 1995 ====
1995 New South Wales state election: Camden
Party	Candidate	Votes	%	±%
Liberal	Liz Kernohan	19,555	46.2	−1.6
Labor	Peter Primrose	16,637	39.3	−3.3
Greens	Vicky Kearney	1,923	4.5	+4.5
Independent	Jim McKenzie	1,592	3.8	+3.8
Call to Australia	James Whitehall	1,072	2.5	+2.5
Citizens Opinion Law Order	Ann Light	889	2.1	+2.1
Independent	Carolyn Allport	674	1.6	+1.6
Total formal votes		42,342	95.8	+6.1
Informal votes		1,849	4.2	−6.1
Turnout		44,191	95.4	
Two-party-preferred result
Liberal	Liz Kernohan	20,963	52.6	+1.1
Labor	Peter Primrose	18,896	47.4	−1.1
Liberal hold		Swing	+1.1	

==== 1991 ====
1991 New South Wales state election: Camden
Party	Candidate	Votes	%	±%
Liberal	Liz Kernohan	14,957	47.8	+3.7
Labor	Peter Primrose	13,330	42.6	+5.4
Independent	Karen Willis	2,991	9.6	+9.6
Total formal votes		31,278	89.7	−7.1
Informal votes		3,579	10.3	+7.1
Turnout		34,857	94.2	
Two-party-preferred result
Liberal	Liz Kernohan	15,693	51.5	−4.5
Labor	Peter Primrose	14,756	48.5	+4.5
Liberal gain from Labor		Swing	−4.5	

=== Elections in the 1980s ===
==== 1988 ====
1988 New South Wales state election: Camden
Party	Candidate	Votes	%	±%
Labor	Peter Primrose	12,363	40.7	−8.1
Liberal	John Ryan	10,334	34.0	−0.5
Independent EFF	Gordon Fetterplace	4,913	16.2	+2.2
Call to Australia	Beville Varidel	1,155	3.8	+3.8
Independent	Michael Dodd	572	1.9	+1.9
Independent	Ronald Brown	397	1.3	+1.3
Independent	Simon Wilson	373	1.2	+1.2
Independent	Clive Sheerin	282	0.9	+0.9
Total formal votes		30,389	96.6	−1.4
Informal votes		1,070	3.4	+1.4
Turnout		31,459	94.2	
Two-party-preferred result
Labor	Peter Primrose	14,111	50.1	−5.7
Liberal	John Ryan	14,080	49.9	+5.7
Labor hold		Swing	−5.7	

==== 1984 ====
1984 New South Wales state election: Camden
Party	Candidate	Votes	%	±%
Liberal	John Fahey	18,656	55.2	+9.5
Labor	Ralph Brading	15,112	44.8	−2.6
Total formal votes		33,768	97.9	+0.7
Informal votes		737	2.1	−0.7
Turnout		34,505	93.3	+1.0
Liberal gain from Labor		Swing	+7.2	

==== 1981 ====
1981 New South Wales state election: Camden
Party	Candidate	Votes	%	±%
Labor	Ralph Brading	14,478	47.4	
Liberal	Peter Reynolds	13,975	45.7	
Democrats	Raymond Guy	2,109	6.9	
Total formal votes		30,562	97.1	
Informal votes		913	2.9	
Turnout		31,475	92.3	
Two-party-preferred result
Labor	Ralph Brading	15,657	52.0	−2.1
Liberal	Peter Reynolds	14,457	48.0	+2.1
Labor notional hold		Swing	−2.1	

==== 1920–1981 ====
District abolished

=== Elections in the 1910s ===
==== 1917 ====
This section is an excerpt from 1917 New South Wales state election § Camden

1917 New South Wales state election: Camden
Party	Candidate	Votes	%	±%
Nationalist	John Hunt	4,412	55.3	−7.8
Labor	Frederick Parker	2,768	34.7	+3.9
Independent	Arthur Bosley	688	8.6	+8.6
Independent	Frederick Webster	115	1.4	+1.4
Total formal votes		7,983	99.0	+1.2
Informal votes		82	1.0	−1.2
Turnout		8,065	60.0	−5.6
Nationalist hold		Swing	−7.8	

==== 1913 ====
1913 New South Wales state election: Camden
Party	Candidate	Votes	%	±%
Liberal Reform	John Hunt	4,492	63.1	
Labor	Michael O'Halloran	2,191	30.8	
Independent Liberal	William Watson	434	6.1	
Total formal votes		7,117	97.8	
Informal votes		161	2.2	
Turnout		7,278	65.6	
Liberal Reform hold				

==== 1910 ====
This section is an excerpt from 1910 New South Wales state election § Camden

1910 New South Wales state election: Camden
Party	Candidate	Votes	%	±%
Liberal Reform	Fred Downes	3,591	67.4	
Labour	Frederick Webster	1,737	32.6	
Total formal votes		5,328	97.9	
Informal votes		61	1.1	
Turnout		5,389	71.4	
Liberal Reform hold				

=== Elections in the 1900s ===
==== 1907 ====
This section is an excerpt from 1907 New South Wales state election § Camden

1907 New South Wales state election: Camden
Party	Candidate	Votes	%	±%
Liberal Reform	Fred Downes	2,671	57.9	
Independent	John Moore	1,867	40.5	
Independent	Frederick Webster	74	1.6	
Total formal votes		4,612	97.0	
Informal votes		142	3.0	
Turnout		4,754	63.7	
Liberal Reform hold				

==== 1904 ====
This section is an excerpt from 1904 New South Wales state election § Camden

1904 New South Wales state election: Camden
Party	Candidate	Votes	%	±%
Liberal Reform	Fred Downes	2,480	48.2	
Progressive	John Kidd (defeated)	2,047	39.8	
Independent Liberal	John Moore	384	7.5	
Independent	John Bartlett	233	4.5	
Total formal votes		5,144	99.2	
Informal votes		43	0.8	
Turnout		5,187	71.6	
Liberal Reform gain from Progressive				

Camden lost part of the district to Wollondilly and absorbed parts of Canterbury and the abolished seats of The Nepean, and Woronora. The member for Camden was John Kidd (Progressive). The member for The Nepean was Thomas Smith who unsuccessfully contested Sherbrooke. The member for Woronora was John Nicholson who successfully contested Wollongong.

==== 1901 ====
This section is an excerpt from 1901 New South Wales state election § Camden

1901 New South Wales state election: Camden
Party	Candidate	Votes	%	±%
Progressive	John Kidd	1,037	63.9	+6.3
Liberal Reform	William Blackmore	585	36.1	
Total formal votes		1,622	99.5	−0.2
Informal votes		9	0.6	+0.2
Turnout		1,631	60.9	−7.6
Progressive hold				

=== Elections in the 1890s ===
==== 1898 ====
This section is an excerpt from 1898 New South Wales colonial election § Camden

1898 New South Wales colonial election: Camden
Party	Candidate	Votes	%	±%
National Federal	John Kidd	1,020	57.6	
Free Trade	Charles Bull	637	36.0	
Independent	Henry Willis	113	6.4	
Total formal votes		1,770	99.6	
Informal votes		8	0.5	
Turnout		1,778	68.5	
National Federal gain from Free Trade				

==== 1895 ====
This section is an excerpt from 1895 New South Wales colonial election § Camden

1895 New South Wales colonial election: Camden
Party	Candidate	Votes	%	±%
Free Trade	Charles Bull	849	50.6	
Protectionist	John Kidd (defeated)	828	49.4	
Total formal votes		1,677	99.7	
Informal votes		5	0.3	
Turnout		1,682	70.6	
Free Trade gain from Protectionist				

==== 1894 ====
This section is an excerpt from 1894 New South Wales colonial election § Camden

1894 New South Wales colonial election: Camden
Party	Candidate	Votes	%	±%
Protectionist	John Kidd	869	43.9	
Free Trade	William Cullen (defeated)	644	32.5	
Independent Labour	Edward Griffiths	467	23.6	
Total formal votes		1,980	99.1	
Informal votes		18	0.9	
Turnout		1,998	84.1	
Protectionist win		(previously 3 members)		

==== 1891 ====
This section is an excerpt from 1891 New South Wales colonial election § Camden

1891 New South Wales colonial election: Camden Saturday 20 June
Party	Candidate	Votes	%	±%
Free Trade	William McCourt (re-elected 1)	2,316	23.2	
Protectionist	John Kidd (re-elected 2)	1,983	19.9	
Free Trade	William Cullen (elected 3)	1,321	13.2	
Free Trade	John Morris	1,289	12.9	
Protectionist	John Walters	1,164	11.7	
Ind. Free Trade	John Campbell	925	9.3	
Protectionist	William Richardson	705	7.1	
Protectionist	James Hanrahan	288	2.9	
Total formal votes		9,991	98.9	
Informal votes		107	1.1	
Turnout		3,809	65.5	
Free Trade hold 2				
Protectionist hold 1				

=== Elections in the 1880s ===
==== 1889 ====
This section is an excerpt from 1889 New South Wales colonial election § Camden

1889 New South Wales colonial election: Camden Saturday 9 February
Party	Candidate	Votes	%	±%
Free Trade	William McCourt (elected 1)	2,083	23.5	
Free Trade	Thomas Garrett (elected 2)	1,722	19.5	
Protectionist	John Kidd (elected 3)	1,714	19.4	
Free Trade	J Hodgson	1,409	15.9	
Protectionist	James Hanrahan	918	10.4	
Protectionist	William Richardson	913	10.3	
Free Trade	John Pidgeon	94	1.1	
Total formal votes		8,853	98.9	
Informal votes		98	1.1	
Turnout		3,419	61.7	
Free Trade hold 2		(1 new seat)		
Protectionist win 1		(1 new seat)		

==== 1887 ====
This section is an excerpt from 1887 New South Wales colonial election § Camden

1887 New South Wales colonial election: Camden Friday 11 February
Party	Candidate	Votes	%	±%
Free Trade	Thomas Garrett (re-elected 1)	1,740	33.3	
Free Trade	William McCourt (elected 2)	1,591	30.5	
Free Trade	John Kidd (defeated)	1,485	28.4	
Protectionist	James Hanrahan	407	7.8	
Total formal votes		5,223	98.9	
Informal votes		58	1.1	
Turnout		3,086	62.0	

==== 1885 ====
This section is an excerpt from 1885 New South Wales colonial election § Camden

1885 New South Wales colonial election: Camden Monday 19 October
Candidate	Votes	%
John Kidd (elected 1)	1,610	37.9
Thomas Garrett (re-elected 2)	1,422	33.5
Henry Badgery (defeated)	1,217	28.6
Total formal votes	4,249	99.4
Informal votes	24	0.6
Turnout	2,649	59.6

==== 1882 ====
This section is an excerpt from 1882 New South Wales colonial election § Camden

1882 New South Wales colonial election: Camden Saturday 2 December
Candidate	Votes	%
William McCourt (elected 1)	1,369	36.0
Thomas Garrett (re-elected 2)	1,233	32.5
John Kidd (defeated)	1,197	31.5
Total formal votes	3,799	99.3
Informal votes	28	0.7
Turnout	2,335	59.4

==== 1880 ====
This section is an excerpt from 1880 New South Wales colonial election § Camden

1880 New South Wales colonial election: Camden Saturday 20 November
Candidate	Votes	%
John Kidd (elected 1)	1,386	32.1
Thomas Garrett (re-elected 2)	1,368	31.7
William McCourt	686	15.9
Joseph Leary (defeated)	567	13.1
Thomas Robertson	314	7.3
Total formal votes	4,321	98.9
Informal votes	50	1.1
Turnout	2,777	80.8

The other siting member Arthur Onslow did not contest the election. Joseph Leary was the sitting member for The Murrumbidgee.

=== Elections in the 1870s ===
==== 1877 ====
This section is an excerpt from 1877 New South Wales colonial election § Camden

1877 New South Wales colonial election: Camden Tuesday 30 October
Candidate	Votes	%
Thomas Garrett (re-elected 1)	762	41.4
Arthur Onslow (re-elected 2)	683	37.1
Thomas Fisher	397	21.6
Total formal votes	1,842	100.0
Informal votes	0	0.0
Turnout	1,255	53.1

==== 1874–75 ====
This section is an excerpt from 1874–75 New South Wales colonial election § Camden

1874–75 New South Wales colonial election: Camden Monday 4 January 1875
Candidate	Votes	%
Thomas Garrett (re-elected 1)	807	40.8
Arthur Onslow (re-elected 2)	717	36.2
James Nichols	456	23.0
Total formal votes	1,980	100.0
Informal votes	0	0.0
Turnout	1,437	48.7

==== 1872 ====
This section is an excerpt from 1872 New South Wales colonial election § Camden

1872 New South Wales colonial election: Camden Monday 26 February
Candidate	Votes	%
Thomas Garrett (elected 1)	925	39.7
Arthur Onslow (re-elected 2)	741	31.8
Richard Roberts	664	28.5
Total formal votes	2,330	100.0
Informal votes	0	0.0
Turnout	1,608	62.9

=== Elections in the 1860s ===
==== 1869–70 ====
This section is an excerpt from 1869–70 New South Wales colonial election § Camden

1869–70 New South Wales colonial election: Camden Tuesday 14 December 1869
Candidate	Votes	%
Arthur Onslow (elected 1)	865	30.8
John Morrice (re-elected 2)	742	26.4
William Sherwin	644	22.9
Simon Belinfante	556	19.8
Total formal votes	2,807	100.0
Informal votes	0	0.0
Turnout	1,497	62.0

==== 1864–65 ====
This section is an excerpt from 1864–65 New South Wales colonial election § Camden

1864–65 New South Wales colonial election: Camden Thursday 15 December 1864
Candidate	Votes	%
John Morrice (re-elected 1)	862	30.0
Richard Roberts (elected 2)	742	25.8
Henry Badgery	642	22.3
Augustus Morris (defeated)	628	21.9
Total formal votes	2,874	100.0
Informal votes	0	0.0
Turnout	1,542	57.8

==== 1861 by-election ====
1861 Camden colonial by-election Thursday 15 August
Candidate	Votes	%
David Bell (elected)	unopposed	

John Douglas resigned.

==== 1860 ====
This section is an excerpt from 1860 New South Wales colonial election § Camden

1860 New South Wales colonial election: Camden Friday 21 December
Candidate	Votes	%
John Morrice (elected 1)	614	39.2
John Douglas (elected 2)	519	33.1
John Plunkett	284	18.1
Henry Oxley (defeated)	149	9.5
Total formal votes	1,566	99.6
Informal votes	6	0.4
Turnout	912	46.7

=== Elections in the 1850s ===
==== 1859 ====
This section is an excerpt from 1859 New South Wales colonial election § Camden

1859 New South Wales colonial election: Camden Tuesday 28 June
Candidate	Votes	%
William Wild (re-elected 1)	674	40.7
Henry Oxley (elected 2)	511	30.8
John Morrice	473	28.5
Total formal votes	1,658	100.0
Informal votes	0	0.0
Turnout	1,064	61.3
