= Electoral results for the district of Sherbrooke =

Election result for Sherbrooke, New South Wales, Australia

Sherbrooke, an electoral district of the Legislative Assembly in the Australian state of New South Wales was created in 1894 and abolished in 1913.

Election	Member	Party
1894	Jacob Garrard	Free Trade
1895	Jacob Garrard	Free Trade
1898	Broughton O'Conor	National Federal
1901	Broughton O'Conor	Independent
1904	Broughton O'Conor	Liberal Reform
1907	John Hunt	Liberal Reform
1910	John Hunt	Liberal Reform

== Election results ==
=== Elections in the 1910s ===
==== 1910 ====
1910 New South Wales state election: Sherbrooke
Party	Candidate	Votes	%	±%
Liberal Reform	John Hunt	4,407	67.4	
Labour	Andrew Thompson	2,134	32.6	
Total formal votes		6,541	98.0	
Informal votes		133	2.0	
Turnout		6,674	74.5	
Liberal Reform hold				

=== Elections in the 1900s ===
==== 1907 ====
1907 New South Wales state election: Sherbrooke
Party	Candidate	Votes	%	±%
Liberal Reform	John Hunt	3,733	73.4	
Labour	Benjamin Prior	476	9.4	
Independent	Robert Lalor	440	8.7	
Independent	Eugene Rudder	417	8.2	
Independent	Donald Campbell	23	0.5	
Total formal votes		5,089	98.0	
Informal votes		102	2.0	
Turnout		5,191	64.1	
Liberal Reform hold				

==== 1904 ====
1904 New South Wales state election: Sherbrooke
Party	Candidate	Votes	%	±%
Liberal Reform	Broughton O'Conor	2,915	62.5	
Ind Progressive	Thomas Smith	1,194	25.6	
Independent Labour	Robert Lalor	549	11.8	
Independent	John McCook	7	0.2	
Total formal votes		4,665	99.0	
Informal votes		45	1.0	
Turnout		4,710	60.4	
Member changed to Liberal Reform from Independent				

Sherbrooke was expanded to include part of The Hawkesbury and parts of the abolished seats of The Nepean and Ryde and Willoughby. Broughton O'Conor (Liberal Reform) was the independent member for Sherbrooke while Thomas Smith (Progressive) was the member for The Nepean. The member for The Hawkesbury was Brinsley Hall (Progressive) who successfully contested that seat, the member for Willoughby was Charles Wade (Liberal Reform) who successfully contested the replacement seat of Gordon while the member for Ryde was Edward Terry (Independent) who did not contest the election.

==== 1901 ====
1901 New South Wales state election: Sherbrooke
Party	Candidate	Votes	%	±%
Independent	Broughton O'Conor	823	56.4	+6.9
Liberal Reform	John Roughley	505	34.6	−13.2
Independent Liberal	Adam Pringle	132	9.0	
Total formal votes		1,460	99.2	−0.1
Informal votes		12	0.8	+0.1
Turnout		1,472	66.0	+4.4
Member changed to Independent from Progressive				

=== Elections in the 1890s ===
==== 1898 ====
1898 New South Wales colonial election: Sherbrooke
Party	Candidate	Votes	%	±%
National Federal	Broughton O'Conor	603	49.5	
Free Trade	Jacob Garrard (defeated)	582	47.8	
Independent	James Purser	33	2.7	
Total formal votes		1,218	99.3	
Informal votes		9	0.7	
Turnout		1,227	61.7	
National Federal gain from Free Trade				

==== 1895 ====
1895 New South Wales colonial election: Sherbrooke
Party	Candidate	Votes	%	±%
Free Trade	Jacob Garrard	585	54.5	
Independent	Broughton O'Conor	333	31.0	
Ind. Protectionist	George Stimson	95	8.9	
Ind. Protectionist	Thomas Pye	45	4.2	
Ind. Free Trade	Edward Wakely	15	1.4	
Total formal votes		1,073	98.4	
Informal votes		18	1.7	
Turnout		1,091	60.8	
Free Trade hold				

==== 1894 ====
1894 New South Wales colonial election: Sherbrooke
Party	Candidate	Votes	%	±%
Free Trade	Jacob Garrard	601	45.0	
Ind. Free Trade	Samuel Bursill	231	17.3	
Ind. Free Trade	John Fitzpatrick	151	11.3	
Labour	James Williamson	95	7.1	
Protectionist	Ambrose Hallen	78	5.8	
Ind. Free Trade	William Bladon	63	4.7	
Ind. Free Trade	Edward Wakely	61	4.6	
Ind. Protectionist	James Tamsett	45	3.4	
Ind. Free Trade	Henry Pigott	8	0.6	
Ind. Free Trade	Donald Campbell	3	0.2	
Total formal votes		1,336	97.3	
Informal votes		37	2.7	
Turnout		1,373	76.2	
Free Trade win		(new seat)		
