= 1861 Camden colonial by-election =

By-election in New South Wales, Australia

A by-election was held for the New South Wales Legislative Assembly electorate of Camden on 15 August 1861 because John Douglas resigned as he was intending to move to Queensland.

== Dates ==
Date	Event
17 July 1861	John Douglas resigned.
30 July 1861	Writ of election issued by the Speaker of the Legislative Assembly.
15 August 1861	Nominations at Camden.
20 August 1861	Polling day between 8 am and 4 pm.
29 August 1861	Return of writ

== Polling places ==
- Camden
- Picton
- Berrima
- Wilton
- The Oaks
- Burragorang
- Sutton Forest
- Bong Bong
- Murrimba

== Results ==
1861 Camden colonial by-election Thursday 15 August
Candidate	Votes	%
David Bell (elected)	unopposed	

== See also ==
- Electoral results for the district of Camden
- List of New South Wales state by-elections
