= Electoral results for the district of Bowral =

Election result for Bowral, New South Wales, Australia

Bowral, an electoral district of the Legislative Assembly in the Australian state of New South Wales was created in 1894 and abolished in 1904.

| Election | Member | Party |
|---|---|---|
| 1894 | William McCourt | Free Trade |
| 1895 by | William McCourt | Free Trade |
| 1895 | William McCourt | Free Trade |
| 1898 | William McCourt | Free Trade |
| 1901 | William McCourt | Liberal Reform |

== Election results ==
=== Elections in the 1900s ===
==== 1901 ====
1901 New South Wales state election: Bowral
| Party | Candidate | Votes | % | ±% |
|---|---|---|---|---|
| Liberal Reform | William McCourt | unopposed | | |
| Liberal Reform hold | | | | |

=== Elections in the 1890s ===
==== 1898 ====
1898 New South Wales colonial election: Bowral
| Party | Candidate | Votes | % | ±% |
|---|---|---|---|---|
| Free Trade | William McCourt | 753 | 75.7 | |
| National Federal | F N Yarwood | 242 | 24.3 | |
| Total formal votes | | 995 | 99.3 | |
| Informal votes | | 7 | 0.7 | |
| Turnout | | 1,002 | 53.8 | |
| Free Trade hold | | | | |

==== 1895 ====
1895 New South Wales colonial election: Bowral
| Party | Candidate | Votes | % | ±% |
|---|---|---|---|---|
| Free Trade | William McCourt | unopposed | | |
| Free Trade hold | | | | |

==== 1895 by-election ====
1895 Bowral by-election Wednesday 13 February
| Party | Candidate | Votes | % | ±% |
|---|---|---|---|---|
| Free Trade | William McCourt | unopposed | | |
| Free Trade hold | | | | |

William McCourt resigned due to bankruptcy.

==== 1894 ====
1894 New South Wales colonial election: Bowral
| Party | Candidate | Votes | % | ±% |
|---|---|---|---|---|
| Free Trade | William McCourt | 846 | 56.3 | |
| Protectionist | John Walters | 338 | 22.5 | |
| Ind. Free Trade | William Richards | 250 | 16.6 | |
| Ind. Free Trade | Henry Taylor | 68 | 4.5 | |
| Total formal votes | | 1,502 | 99.1 | |
| Informal votes | | 14 | 0.9 | |
| Turnout | | 1,516 | 81.7 | |
| Free Trade win | | (new seat) | | |
