= 1895 Bowral colonial by-election =

By-election in New South Wales, Australia

A by-election for the seat of Bowral in the New South Wales Legislative Assembly was held on 14 June 1895 because William McCourt (Free Trade) was forced to resign because he was bankrupt, but was re-elected unopposed.

== Dates ==
Date	Event
4 February 1895	William McCourt resigned.
6 February 1895	Writ of election issued by the Speaker of the Legislative Assembly.
8 February 1895	William McCourt declared bankrupt.
13 February 1895	Day of nomination
19 February 1895	Polling day
25 February 1895	Return of writ

== Result ==
1895 Bowral by-election Wednesday 13 February
Party	Candidate	Votes	%	±%
Free Trade	William McCourt	unopposed		
Free Trade hold				

== See also ==
- Electoral results for the district of Bowral
- List of New South Wales state by-elections
