= Intelligence (newspaper) =

The Intelligence was a weekly newspaper published in Bowral, New South Wales in 1884.

== History ==
The Intelligence was first published on 8 October 1884 by William and Daniel Beer, who also published the Bowral Free Press. The Intelligence and the Bowral Free Press were intended to operate as separate newspapers, and content in one would not be republished in the other. The Intelligence only produced four issues before it ceased publication on 29 October 1884. As a result, on 5 November 1884, the Bowral Free Press changed its name to Bowral Free Press and Berrima District Intelligencer and began to be published twice weekly.

== Digitisation ==
The paper has been digitised as part of the Australian Newspapers Digitisation Program project of the National Library of Australia.

== See also ==
- List of newspapers in Australia
- List of newspapers in New South Wales
