= Charles Bull =

Charles Bull may refer to:

- Charles Bull (politician) (1846–1906), Australian politician
- Charlie Bull (1909–1939), English cricketer
- Charles Livingston Bull (1874–1932), American illustrator
