= Richard Roberts (Australian politician) =

Australian politician

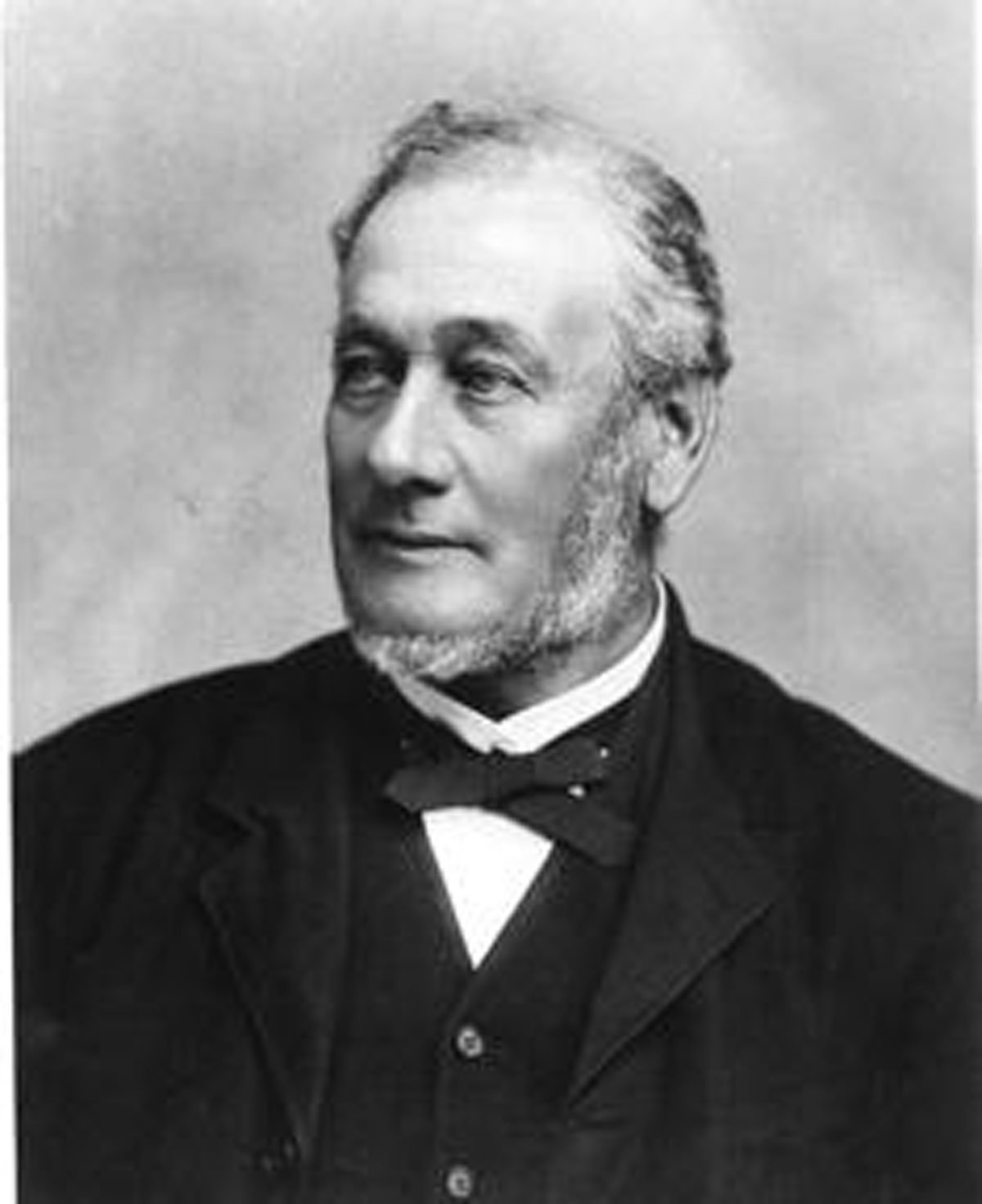
- Roberts, date unknown

Personal details
- Born: July 10, 1835
- Died: June 17, 1903 (aged 67); Roberton Park, New South Wales
- Relations: James Roberts (uncle); John Lackey (stepfather)
- Children: 9
- Occupation: Politician; pastoralist

Richard Hutchinson Roberts (10 July 1835 – 17 June 1903) was an Australian pastoralist and politician who was appointed Member of the New South Wales Legislative Council for life on 22 August 1882. Roberts was the owner of the estates of Roberton Park and Currawong.

== Biography ==
Richard Hutchinson Roberts was born in Sydney on 10 July 1835, one of seven children to Joseph Roberts, a businessman, and Martha Anne Drummond Roberts née Hutchinson. Roberts came from a Camden settler family, and both his parents were of Australian birth. His mother was the daughter of William Hutchinson. His father later died, and his mother married politician John Lackey in 1851. One of Roberts' cousins was Tom Dangar, another politician. Roberts was educated at Surry Hills under Rev. T. L. Dodds and The King's School, Parramatta, where he was a contemporary of many notable colonists.

On 22 September 1853, Roberts married Susanna Neich, daughter of Bath Arms Hotel owner Emanuel Sebastiano Danero Neich. They had four daughters and five sons. After the marriage, Roberts resided in Burwood before moving to Liverpool, where he cultivated and raised cattle on a substantial area of land. Because of the then-prevalent danger of floods, Roberts purchased the estate of Roberton Park, near Bowral. Roberts was well-respected in Roberton Park, where he spent a significant amount of money on buildings, fencing, clearing, and other examples of upkeep. He grew large amounts of root vegetables, mainly turnips and potatoes. He also frequently yielded 60 bushels of wheat per acre before the crops were beset by wheat leaf rust.

In 1861, Roberts was commissioned as a justice of the peace. Between 15 December 1864 and 15 November 1869, Roberts served on the New South Wales Legislative Assembly as the member for Camden. Under the Constitution Act, Roberts was appointed for life to the New South Wales Legislative Council on 22 August 1882. According to his obituary in the Bowral Free Press, Roberts "was esteemed for his social qualities but he never took an active part in politics, and rarely joined in the more important discussions that took place in the Legislative Council."

Roberts also served as the vice president of the New South Wales Sheepbreeders Association from 1895 until 1903. After his wife died in 1897, Roberts married Leila Helen Riach on 11 January 1900. He died suddenly at Roberton Park on 17 June 1903 from the bursting of a blood vessel, having been in ill health for quite some time. A member of the Church of England, Roberts had his funeral at Glenquarry cemetery with Church of England rites.

New South Wales Legislative Assembly
| Preceded by David Bell | Member for Camden; 1864–1869; Served alongside: John Morrice | Succeeded by Arthur Onslow |
