= List of mayors of Campbelltown =

Mayor of City of Campbelltown
- Incumbent; Cr. Darcy Lound (Labor) since 15 October 2024
- Style: His/Her Worship
- Appointer: Council of the City of Campbelltown
- Term length: Two years
- Formation: 21 January 1882
- First holder: John Ahearn
- Deputy: Karen Hunt (Labor)
- Website: www.campbelltown.nsw.gov.au

This is a list of mayors of the Council of the City of Campbelltown, a local government area in the south-western region of Sydney, New South Wales, Australia. Campbelltown Council was originally incorporated on 21 January 1882; and was declared a city on 4 May 1968.

The Mayor is elected by the Councillors for a fixed two-year term. The current mayor is Cr. Darcy Lound, a member of the Labor Party.

== Mayors ==
The following individuals have served as Mayor of the City of Campbelltown:

Ordinal	Mayor	Party	Term start	Term end	Time in office	Notes
1	John Ahearn		28 February 1882	14 February 1883	351 days	
2	Charles Bull		14 February 1883	12 February 1885	1 year, 364 days	
3	Alex Munro		12 February 1885	8 February 1887	1 year, 361 days	
4	William Caldwell		8 February 1887	11 February 1888	1 year, 3 days	
5	William Cummins		11 February 1888	7 February 1889	362 days	
6	William Graham Jnr.		7 February 1889	13 February 1890	1 year, 6 days	
7	James Bocking		13 February 1890	5 February 1891	357 days	
8	David Barker		5 February 1891	12 February 1892	1 year, 7 days	
-	William Caldwell		12 February 1892	20 February 1893	1 year, 8 days	
9	Henry Vaughan		20 February 1893	28 February 1894	1 year, 8 days	
10	Nicholas Doyle		28 February 1894	19 February 1895	356 days	
11	Tom Gamble		19 February 1895	12 February 1897	1 year, 359 days	
-	David Barker		12 February 1897	21 February 1899	2 years, 9 days	
12	Ted Sedgwick		21 February 1899	15 November 1899 [res]	267 days	
-	No mayor		15 November 1899	30 December 1899	45 days	
-	William Cummins		30 December 1899	15 February 1901	1 year, 47 days	
13	Fred Moore		15 February 1901	15 February 1909	8 years, 0 days	
14	Sam Bursill		15 February 1909	11 February 1914	4 years, 361 days	
-	Fred Moore		11 February 1914	14 February 1919	5 years, 3 days	
15	Charlie Hannaford		14 February 1919	19 December 1924	5 years, 309 days	
16	Roy Gamble		19 December 1924	5 December 1925	351 days	
17	Percy Marlow		5 December 1925	5 December 1929	4 years, 0 days	
18	Jim Kershler		5 December 1929	10 December 1936	7 years, 5 days	
19	Jack Westbury		10 December 1936	7 December 1938	1 year, 362 days	
-	Percy Marlow		7 December 1938	Dec 1945		
20	Phillip Solomon		Dec 1945	1950		
-	Percy Marlow		1950	1952		
21	John (Jack) Farnsworth		1952	1956		
22	Frederick Joseph Fitzpatrick		1956	1959		
23	Harold Gregory (Greg) Percival		1959	1961		
24	Kathleen Whitten		1961	1962		
25	Thomas (Keith) Fraser		1962	1964		
26	Clive Tregear	Independent	1964	1972		
27	Cecil Mulholland	Independent	1972	1973		
28	Robert (Bob) Barton	Independent	1973	1976		
29	Gordon Fetterplace OAM	Independent	1976	1981		
30	Guy Thomas	Independent	1981	1983		
31	Bryce Regan	Labor	1983	1984		
-	Gordon Fetterplace OAM	Independent	1984	1985		
-	Guy Thomas	Independent	1985	1986		
-	Bryce Regan	Labor	1986	1987		
32	Peter Primrose	Labor	1987	1988		
33	James (Jim) Kremmer	Labor	1988	1991		
-	Gordon Fetterplace OAM	Independent	1991	May 1992		
34	Leslie Patterson	Independent	May 1992	1993		
35	Meg Oates	Labor	1993	1994		
36	Russell Matheson	Independent	1994	1995		
-	Meg Oates	Labor	1995	1996		
-	Russell Matheson	Independent	1996	1997		
-	Meg Oates	Labor	1997	1998		
37	Paul Sinclair	Independent	1998	1999		
-	Meg Oates	Labor	1999	2000		
-	Jim Kremmer	Independent	2000	2001		
-	Russell Matheson	Independent	2001	2002		
38	Brenton Banfield	Labor	2002	2005		
-	Russell Matheson	Community First	2005	2006		
39	Aaron Rule	Labor	2006	2008		
-	Russell Matheson	Community First	2008	2009		
-	Aaron Rule	Labor	2009	2010		
40	Paul Lake	Community First	2010	2011		
41	Anoulack Chanthivong	Labor	2011	2012		
42	Sue Dobson	Community Service	2012	2013		
43	Clinton Mead	Liberal Democrats	2013	2014		
-	Paul Lake	Independent	15 September 2014	18 September 2015	1 year, 3 days	
44	Paul Hawker	Liberal	18 September 2015	10 September 2016	358 days	
45	George Brticevic	Labor	27 September 2016	3 December 2021	5 years, 67 days	
46	George Greiss	Liberal	11 January 2022	15 October 2024	2 years, 278 days	
47	Darcy Lound	Labor	15 October 2024	present	2 years, 38 days	
