= Paul O'Grady (politician) =

Australian politician

Member of the Legislative Council of New South Wales
- In office 19 March 1988 – 3 January 1996
- Succeeded by: Peter Primrose

Personal details
- Born: Paul Francis O'Grady; 14 July 1960 Ryde, New South Wales, Australia
- Died: 18 January 2015 (aged 54) Darlinghurst, New South Wales, Australia
- Party: Labor
- Domestic partner(s): Murray Ward (b.1967–d. May 1994)
- Occupation: Politician and trade unionist and activist

Paul Thomas Francis O'Grady (14 July 1960 – 18 January 2015) was an Australian politician. He was a Labor member of the New South Wales Legislative Council from 1988 to 1996 and was the first openly gay member of the New South Wales Parliament.

== Early life and career ==
O'Grady was born in Ryde in Northern Sydney, and worked as a shop assistant and a union organiser for the shop assistants section within the Australian Workers' Union. He joined the Labor Party in at the age of 15 in 1975, becoming involved within Young Labor. Having known he was gay from an early age, O'Grady came out to his parents at age 16:

It's not something that went down stunningly well at the time, but you know, over the years they've got to accept it or tolerate it or understand it, or whatever, and I've been pretty lucky in the sense to have the family that I have. Because its not, it's never been a family which has been judgmental, which has said you know 'you can't do this'. It's been a family that says 'well that's your decision'.

O'Grady soon joined the moderate 'Soft' Left faction of the party and won a ballot for the Assistant Secretary of Australian Young Labor 1984, but failed to gain enough support to run as President of NSW Young Labor. O'Grady also worked as a party research officer for the NSW Treasurer, Ken Booth, from 1981 until 1988.

== Political career ==
O'Grady was elected as a Labor member of the Legislative Council in 1988. Making his maiden speech to the council during a debate on the Summary Offences Bill on 2 June 1988, O'Grady spoke out against excess of NSW Police Force powers and for the decriminalisation of prostitution while also thanking his primary supporters and inspirations in the Labor movement: "I owe a great deal to the faith and trust that people such as former Deputy Premier Jack Ferguson, Delcia Kite and John Faulkner placed in me during the years that I have been active in the Labor Party. I thank also the person for whom I worked for seven years–Ken Booth. He really is one of the most genuine, decent and humane human beings I have ever met."

Although O'Grady was gay, he did not openly declare it until 1990, several years after his election, thus becoming the first openly gay member of the New South Wales Parliament. In June 1990 O'Grady gave an interview with the Sydney Star Observer, which served as a catalyst for his public outing, and which was then followed by a television interview with Jana Wendt on the Nine Network. This interview was the catalyst for a media avalanche that surprised even him. Some of his conservative upper house colleagues were less than enthused, with the ALP President of the Legislative Council Johno Johnson commenting "Of course, homosexuality is unnatural, but at least there is no second generation of homosexuals is there?", and in response O'Grady noted that most politicians were more socially conservative than the people who elected them: "there is no doubt I have experienced more discrimination in Parliament House than anywhere else. Unlike politicians, who are driven by opinion polls, I think the electorate is reasonably tolerant, and recognises that there are all sorts of different views. I do not think voters are worried about the sexual preferences of politicians. What they are looking for is integrity in their politicians".

O'Grady went on to champion the gay and lesbian community in parliament, inviting all MPs to join him in marching in the 1992 Mardi Gras. The multi-party delegation included Elisabeth Kirkby, Clover Moore, Ernie Page, Jan Burnswoods, Meredith Burgmann and Jeff Shaw, who would later back up his support with some key reforms as attorney-general including the review of discrimination in law and the 'Gay panic' legal defence. In July 1992, O'Grady led a day of protest against Defence Minister Robert Ray's decision to reinforce the Australian Defence Force's ban on LGBT personnel, declaring that "We should not have to be fighting in 1992 on this issue". O'Grady presented a submission to the subsequent Labor Caucus Committee on the possibility of overturning the ban and in September the committee recommended it be overturned. In November 1992 the ban was abolished by the Keating Government.

In 1992 O'Grady made headlines by demanding that his boyfriend, Murray Ward, a university lecturer, be extended the same travel and other benefits as other parliamentarians' heterosexual partners, a request that he continued to ask for the next three years. In 1993 O'Grady revealed to the Sydney Star Observer that 000 Emergency phone operators had refused him assistance when he and Ward were attacked by a gang on William Street, asking him three times if it was a life-threatening situation before hanging up: "My life was not in danger but my point is this – any citizen has a right to report crime or potential crime and if the police are serious about combating street violence against gays and lesbians then they have to intervene before someone is bashed." However, in May 1994 Murray Ward died and it was revealed that O'Grady had found his 26-year-old partner dead from an accidental heroin overdose in his Paddington flat.

O'Grady initially considered running for preselection as the Labor candidate in the Legislative Assembly seat of Bligh against independent MP Clover Moore, for the March 1995 state election. However he later withdrew in favour of former Sydney Gay and Lesbian Mardi Gras president, Susan Harben, who was nevertheless defeated by Moore at the election. On 30 May 1995 O'Grady was given leave by the Labor Party to introduce a private member's bill into the council to provide for 'regulation to protect medical practitioners who assist the terminally ill to end their lives', which would make such a bill the first time a bill concerning euthanasia would be considered by the Parliament. He had not done so, however, at the time of his resignation.

Although elected for a second eight-year term at the March 1995 state election, O'Grady resigned due to health concerns on 3 January 1996 and the vacancy he created was filled by Peter Primrose. Six months after his resignation from parliament in July 1996, after various circulating rumours, O'Grady announced on television that he had AIDS. He made his announcement on the current affairs programme "Witness", hosted by Jana Wendt, stating: "I’m 35. I resigned from parliament in January. My parliamentary career is behind me. I have AIDS. It is progressing. I will fight on. Mind over matter." He also noted that despite concerns over the personal nature of his admission, he made it as "the discrimination against HIV is something which needs to be dealt with out there in the public arena". His admission was met with overwhelming support including the Labor Premier Bob Carr, who said: "Having a politician say, 'This is my life, HIV and Aids', is a reminder to everyone that a lot more of this is going to happen in our society." For his part, O'Grady noted that he thought more about his partner, Murray Ward, than his diagnosis: "I get more maudlin about Murray than I do about me. It crippled me. And in a sense I have probably missed him more in the past six months, because we did have plans post-parliament, and he's not around to participate".

Parliamentary committee service:
Position	Start	End
Member, Standing Committee on State Development	1 November 1988	1 November 1991
Member, Estimates Committee	1 November 1991	1 November 1994
Member, Regulation Review Committee	1 November 1991	1 November 1994

== Later life ==
A few years later, with health significantly improved, O'Grady returned to work as a staffer for the ALP, including as Chief of Staff to the Minister for Tourism and Sport and Recreation in the Carr and Iemma governments, Sandra Nori from 2003 to 2007. While Chief of Staff, O'Grady became involved in the controversy surrounding cabinet minister Milton Orkopoulos and his being charged for underage sexual offences. It was claimed in November 2006 by Nationals MP, Adrian Piccoli that O'Grady had tipped him off about Orkopoulos' behaviour several months before he was formally charged by police, which O'Grady denied. He did admit, however, that he had learned in August 2006 that Orkopoulos was under investigation from his former electorate officer, Gillian Sneddon, who wanted his advice. O'Grady then arranged a meeting with David Tierney, a friend of Premier Iemma, to indirectly inform the Premier's office of the investigations. This did not happen and Iemma regarded the case against Orkopoulos as 'rumour and innuendo' up until his formal charging on 8 November, leading to criticism arising from the allegation that Iemma had left a minister in his cabinet knowing he was under investigation for such serious offences.

In 2011, O'Grady was diagnosed with cancer and underwent preliminary treatment. In late 2011, the Independent Commission Against Corruption (ICAC) commenced an inquiry that heard allegations that former ALP MLC and Minister Ian Macdonald, while Minister, accepted sexual favours in return for introducing businessmen to executives of state-owned energy companies and also alleged that property developer Ron Medich acted as a broker for Macdonald and was seeking to do business with government agencies where Macdonald had influence as a Minister. O'Grady, while in hospital for treatment of cancer, then went on the ABC television program, Stateline, and criticised the party for its culture of corruption, dodgy financial deals and treatment of former Orkopoulos staffer Gillian Sneddon, predicting that the NSW Labor Party would have a long period in opposition unless such issues were thoroughly dealt with.

In May 2013, O'Grady appeared before the ICAC again during a separate investigation of allegations that Macdonald, as a government minister, had rorted a government coal licence tender which lead to a $30 million windfall for Labor 'powerbroker' and coal field property-owner Eddie Obeid and his family. When asked questions in response to a previous statement from Obeid that Macdonald had never been in his office, O'Grady noted that he was "incredulous" and thought there had been a mistake in the record. O'Grady, who as an MLC had his office next door to Obeid, noted that he had seen Macdonald "coming and going back and forth all the time" and later described to media that Obeid and Macdonald were "partners in crime" and that there was a "goat track" worn between their two offices.

O'Grady died at Sacred Heart Hospice in Darlinghurst on 18 January 2015. His long-term partner, Murray Ward, had died in 1994. O'Grady's contribution to public life was commemorated by the Federal Member for Newcastle, Sharon Claydon, in a constituency statement on 23 February 2015, noting:

As an MLC, Paul was fearless in his pursuit of social justice and a positive agenda for change. His inaugural speech touched on many issues that he was passionate about: Aboriginal land rights, censorship, drug law reform, workers rights, policing, public housing, prison reform and the legalisation of brothels. He pursued these issues and many others in his eight years in parliament, facing inequalities and discrimination front on, wherever and whenever he found them. There was no better friend than Paul O'Grady. He was warm, generous and compassionate with a wicked sense of humour. His irreverent approach to life and steadfast commitment to living life with integrity meant that you rarely forgot your encounters with Paul.

Several years later, during the second reading debate on the Marriage Amendment (Definition and Religious Freedoms) Bill 2017, the Member for Grayndler, Anthony Albanese, also reflected on O'Grady and his role in the moves toward LGBT equality:

In June 1990, my courageous friend Paul O'Grady, a member of the New South Wales Legislative Council, came out as a gay man. He was most certainly not the first gay man elected to the New South Wales parliament, but it took until 1990 for someone to have the confidence to declare their sexuality openly. When I discussed this move with Paul, he said very clearly, 'I am who I am.' It was an act of courage that made it much easier for other people in the same circumstance as Paul to openly declare their sexuality.
