= Eucalyptus cullenii =

Cullen's ironbark

Scientific classification
- Kingdom: Plantae
- Clade: Tracheophytes
- Clade: Angiosperms
- Clade: Eudicots
- Clade: Rosids
- Order: Myrtales
- Family: Myrtaceae
- Genus: Eucalyptus
- Species: E. cullenii

Binomial name
- Eucalyptus cullenii Cambage

Species of eucalyptus

Eucalyptus cullenii, commonly known as Cullen's ironbark, is a species of small to medium-sized tree that is endemic to Queensland. It has thick, rough, deeply furrowed "ironbark", lance-shaped adult leaves, green to yellow flower buds in groups of seven, white flowers and hemispherical fruit.

== Description ==
Eucalyptus cullenii is a tree that typically grows to a height of 15 m (49 ft) and forms a lignotuber. It has thick, rough, dark grey or black, deeply and widely furrowed ironbark on its trunk and branches. Young plants and coppice regrowth have dull, linear to narrow lance-shaped leaves 40–110 mm (1.6–4.3 in) long and 4–15 mm (0.16–0.59 in) wide. Adult leaves are lance-shaped, the same dull green or greyish green on both sides, 70–150 mm (2.8–5.9 in) long and 8–15 mm (0.31–0.59 in) wide on a petiole 7–17 mm (0.28–0.67 in) long. The flower buds are arranged in groups of seven on a peduncle 5–20 mm (0.20–0.79 in) long, the individual buds on a pedicel 3–7 mm (0.12–0.28 in) long. Mature buds are oval to spherical or pear-shaped, green to yellow, 4–6 mm (0.16–0.24 in) long and 3–4 mm (0.12–0.16 in) wide with a rounded operculum. Flowering occurs from January to May and the flowers are white. The fruit is a woody hemispherical capsule 2–4 mm (0.079–0.157 in) long and 4–8 mm (0.16–0.31 in) wide on a pedicel 2–7 mm (0.079–0.276 in) long with the valves close to rim level.

== Taxonomy and naming ==
Eucalyptus cullenii was first formally described in 1920 by Richard Hind Cambage from a specimen collected at Almaden in 1913. The specific epithet (cullenii) honours William Portus Cullen, a barrister and later Chief Justice of New South Wales.

== Distribution and habitat ==
Cullen's ironbark grows in red podsols and shallow stony soil in hilly or undulating woodland on the northern and eastern parts of the Cape York Peninsula.

== Conservation status ==
This eucalypt is classified as "least concern" under the Queensland Government Nature Conservation Act 1992.

== See also ==
- List of Eucalyptus species
