= Thomas Garrett (Australian politician) =

Australian politician

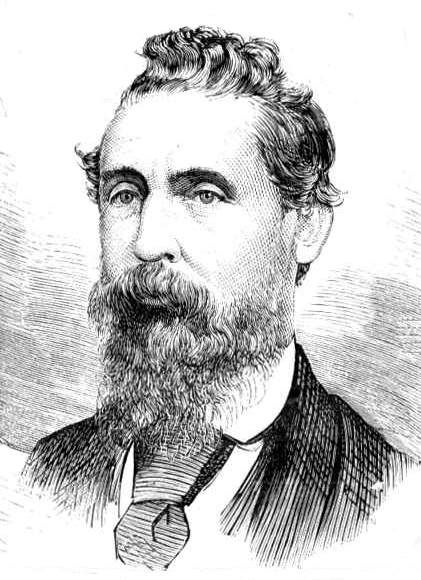

Personal details
- Born: 16 July 1830 Liverpool, England
- Died: 25 November 1891 (aged 61)

Thomas Garrett (16 July 1830 – 25 November 1891) was a member of the New South Wales Legislative Assembly, newspaper proprietor and land agent.

== Early life ==
Garrett was born in Liverpool, England to John Garrett and Sarah, née Stafford and went to New South Wales with his parents when nine years of age arriving 12 November 1840. A year later he was bound to the printing business, but during his apprenticeship he ran away, and became a cabin-boy on H.M.S. Fly, then employed in resurveying the coast between Port Jackson and Hobson's Bay. The youth was soon sent back, and having finished his apprenticeship, he was engaged on a number of newspapers, subsequently being employed in the Government printing office, where he worked for three years. Mr. Garrett then turned his attention to journalism, and in 1855 established the Illawarra Mercury, and afterwards also the Alpine Pioneer and the Manaro Mercury.

== Politics ==
His father entered Parliament in 1859 as the member for Shoalhaven. In 1860 Thomas joined his father in Parliament, sitting for the Monaro constituency, acknowledged as the lieutenant of John Robertson. In 1964 he moved to his father's old seat of Shoalhaven which had been vacated by Robertson, and he sat as member until 1871, when he resigned due to financial pressures to accept an appointment as a police magistrate at Berrima. He was bankrupted on 24 February 1872. Not caring for official life, he again entered Parliament, this time for Camden, for which electorate he sat until the general election in June 1892, when, on account of ill-health, he decided not to again contest the seat, and bade farewell to political life.

He was Secretary for Lands in the third Robertson Ministry from February 1875 to February 1877. Garrett was accused of bribery in relation to positions within the Department of Lands, and insobriety affecting his capacity to fulfill his responsibilities as minister. Garrett resigned as minister and the government narrowly survived a censure motion by 29 votes to 26. In the fourth Robertson ministry he filled the same post from August 1877. Garrett had a disagreement with Robertson on the question of the Land Bill and resigned in October, however the resignation was not accepted until 19 November 1877. He was succeeded, as on the former occasion, by Ezekiel Baker.

In March 1881 Julian Salomons was appointed a royal commissioner to inquire into inquire into the expenditure and distribution of £17,100, paid by the Government, under the authority of a Parliamentary vote, to the Milburn Creek Copper Mining Co Ltd. Ezekial Baker, one of the trustees, was the Secretary for Mines. Salomons reported that "there was an appropriation by the trustees to themselves ... under circumstances of concealment and false statement" and that there was an inference that one of the trustees, George Waddell, had bribed Garrett to vote in favour of the payment. Following publication of the report, the Legislative Assembly voted 71 votes to 2 to expel Baker. Two days later Parkes moved a similar motion in relation to Garrett, however the motion was defeated by 40 votes to 38.

He was again Secretary for Lands in the fourth Parkes ministry from January 1887 to July 1888.

== Personal life ==
Garrett was married three times, to Mary Ann née Creagan on 30 September 1856, to Marcia née Grocott and to Elizabeth née McPhillamy. Thomas William, his second son to Mary Ann, was an early Australian Test cricketer.

Garrett died on 25 November 1891 (aged 61) at Newtown. He was survived by Elizabeth, three sons of Mary Ann, a son of Marcia and two infant sons of Elizabeth.

Parliament of New South Wales
Political offices
Preceded by James Farnell	Secretary for Lands; 1875 – February 1877	Succeeded by Ezekiel Baker
Preceded by Richard Driver	Secretary for Lands; August – November 1877	Succeeded by Ezekiel Baker
Preceded by Henry Copeland	Secretary for Lands; 1887 – 1888	Succeeded by Sir Henry Parkes
New South Wales Legislative Assembly
Preceded by Alexander Hamilton	Member for Monaro; 1860 – 1864	Succeeded by William Cullen
Preceded by John Robertson	Member for Shoalhaven; 1864 – 1871	Succeeded by James Warden
Preceded by James Martin	Member for Camden; 1872 – 1891; Served alongside: Arthur Onslow / John Kidd & William McCourt	Succeeded by William Cullen
Preceded by John Morrice	Member for Camden; 1872 – 1891; Served alongside: Arthur Onslow / John Kidd & William McCourt	Succeeded by William Cullen
