= Sibella Macarthur-Onslow =

Australia charity and church worker (1871 – 1943)

Rosa Sibella Macarthur-Onslow
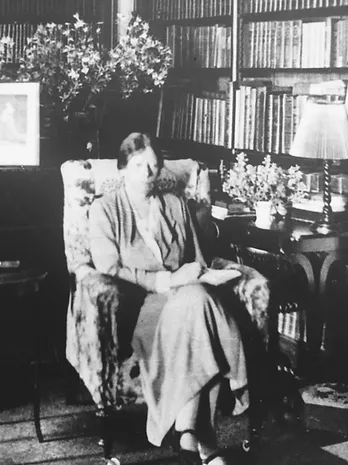
- Born: Rosa Sibella Walton Onslow; 4 June 1871; Camden Park, New South Wales
- Died: 16 July 1943 (aged 72); Menangle, New South Wales
- Known for: Managing the Camden Park Estate

Rosa Sibella Walton Macarthur-Onslow CBE (4 June 1871 – 16 July 1943) was an Australian charity and church worker. She inherited and managed Camden Park in New South Wales. Guests at the house included the Duke and Duchess of York.

== Life ==
Macarthur-Onslow was born in 1871 at Camden Park which was her family's 20,000 acre estate. Her parents were Elizabeth (née Macarthur) and Captain Arthur Alexander Walton Onslow, R.N. who became a member of parliament. While her brothers were sent to private schools in Australia and Britain for their education, she was taught by a German tutor and her mother. Her father died in 1882 and her mother took over the management of the estate. Macarthur-Onslow would organise frequent musical evenings at Camden Park which were led by Emmeline Woolley and Ethel Charlotte Pedley.

Her mother's father had helped to establish the Australian wool industry. Her mother was the end of her father's line. In 1892, a Royal license was obtained to allow her mother and her children to take the surname Macarthur-Onslow.

When her mother died, she did not leave the care of the estate to her son but to Macarthur-Onslow. She was given the house and nearly 1,000 acres as an estate and a lump sum of £20,000 to keep Camden Park maintained. Guests at the house included the Duke and Duchess of York in 1927. When Hardy Wilson published his illustrated Old Colonial Architecture in New South Wales and Tasmania in 1924 which recorded some of the great houses of Australia, Macarthur-Onslow was disappointed to find that Camden House had not been included.

In the New Years Honours list of 1930 she became a CBE. A reception in her honour attracted many VIPs including NSW Premier Thomas Bavin. In 1931, she decided to exchange houses with her brother James William MacArthur-Onslow. Camden House had only been given to her for her lifetime and she knew that her mother had been very keen to see the house remain in the family. He came to live at Camden House and she went to live nearby at Gilbulla.

Macarthur-Onslow died in 1943 in the parish of Menangle.

== Publications ==
In 1914 she published "Some Early Records of the Macarthurs of Camden". This was a work that her mother has nearly finished and Sibella completed, edited, and published it.
