= European settlers in New Zealand =

European settlers in New Zealand, also known locally as Pākehā settlers, began arriving in the country in the early 19th century as settlers of various types, initially settling around the Bay of Islands mostly. Large-scale organised settlement and migration from the island of Great Britain to other regions in New Zealand began in the 1840s, such as to Wellington, Canterbury and Otago regions.

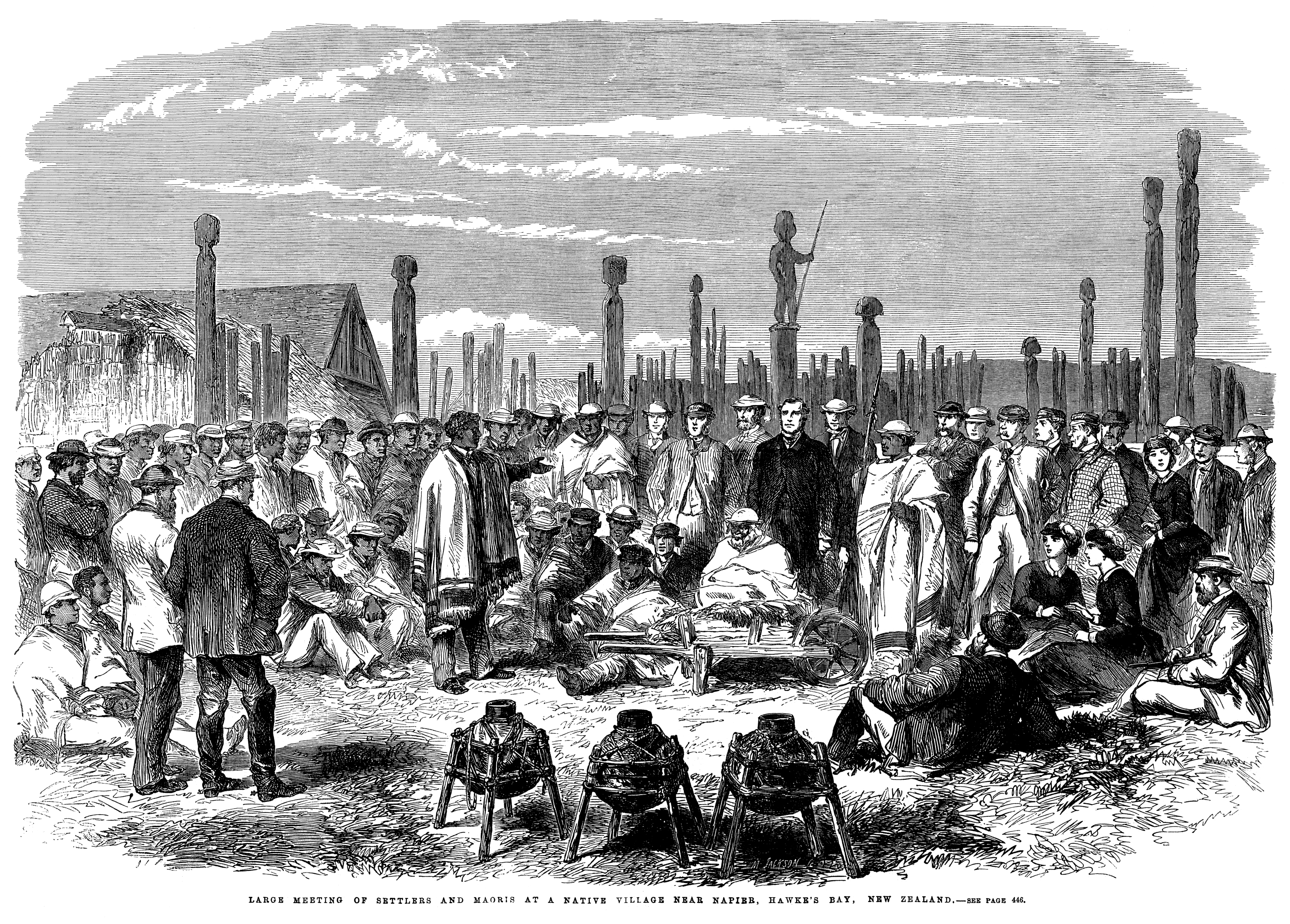
European settlers and Māori people meet at Waiohiki in Hawke's Bay, 1863

== Early settlements ==
There was at first minimal immigration to New Zealand directly after 1769 when Captain James Cook first visited the islands. Between 1805 and 1835 the European population grew very slowly. Most Europeans were itinerant sailors. The Bay of Islands and the Hokianga in Northland had the most Europeans with about 200 in the 1830s. Before 1835, most settlers were runaway sailors, escaped convicts, sealers, whalers and missionaries with their families.

An early custom of European settlers was to use the native poroporo berry to make jam. As more settlers arrived, feral pigs released during the earliest visits to the islands, which became known as Captain Cooker types, became scarcer as they were over-hunted. Despite often being poor and burdened with debt, Pākehā settlers working and farming new land benefited from the infrastructure of the British Empire, with secure titles, Crown-granted lands and protection by Land Transfer Acts.

=== New Zealand Company ===
The New Zealand Company was founded as a commercial operation designed for investors. It believed the solution to mass starvation was to export surplus population. Edward Gibbon Wakefield was involved with the company.

==== Wellington ====
Wellington was the first official settlement set up by the New Zealand Company for recently arrived immigrants. The first settlers arrived at Petone from England in 1840. At this point the majority of immigrants sailed from England, particularly London, but may have originated elsewhere in the UK. Most of those who arrived were timber workers, bullock drivers, shopkeepers, rope makers and artisans. This posed a problem as Wellington was an agricultural settlement but there were few people with the skills to farm the land. It was clear that neither the occupational or social composition of this early settlement was varied and as a result this assisted in giving Wellington a shaky beginning as a developing settlement.

==== Whanganui ====
Wanganui was the second Wakefield settlement to be established although it was set up with some reluctance. Late 1840 Wellington settlers found that there was insufficient land available in their original settlement to satisfy their land claims and Colonel Wakefield was forced to offer them the option of land in the Wanganui settlement. Bringing with them England's Victorian era cultural practices, their settlement resulted in the social and occupational composition of Wanganui being much the same as Wellington. There was already a Māori population in Wanganui and they disputed the questionable land purchase by the New Zealand Company. There was unrest between the Māori and Pākehā until 1848, when Donald Maclean, an assistant to the Native Protector, sorted out boundaries and land title by purchasing the area officially.

==== New Plymouth ====
New Plymouth was the following settlement to be established. Originally the development of the settlement was organised by the Plymouth Company but they merged with the New Zealand Company in 1840, resulting in New Plymouth becoming the next Wakefield settlement. Workers were attracted from England by being offered jobs working on establishing roads in the New Plymouth area. This originally brought a large number of settlers to the region but in 1843 it was no longer financially viable for the English company in charge of this arrangement to offer this opportunity. The company in England to reduce spending gave the local agent and as a result they ended the offer of employment provided by the company. Because of the lack of employment opportunities that this resulted in many settlers left New Plymouth choosing to move to Auckland or even Adelaide. This did leave more job opportunities for the remaining settlers and by the mid-1850s New Plymouth began to prosper; by that time it had a population of 2000. It had the resources to export wheat, barley and oats to other settlements and the land was extremely cultivatable.

==== Otago ====
In 1842 the New Zealand Company decided that they would establish a settlement for Scottish Presbyterian immigrants. Fred Tuckett was employed to find the settlement and do the surveying. He settled on Otago in the South Island. Because of the isolation in Otago and the lack of previous development in the area, it was difficult to attract prospective farm owners. However the resident agent for the New Zealand Company who lived in the area was determined to get the scheme underway. A promotional campaign started up in Scotland and a public meeting at Glasgow Trades Hall inspired people enough to warrant the use of two ships to transport the new settlers to New Zealand. It did take time to establish the settlement in Otago mainly because the majority of the Scottish settlers were only working class and relatively poor. This meant that occupation wise they did everything for themselves, unable to afford to employ labour. Once the settlement had got under way most settlers had succeeded in establishing themselves on farms and were making money from agricultural work.

=== Canterbury Association ===
The Canterbury Association was formed in 1848, inspired by Edward Gibbon Wakefield and John Robert Godley. The Association's first four ships arrived in December 1850. By 1853, a total of 3,549 settlers had arrived in the Canterbury Region.

=== Auckland ===
Auckland was initially an unplanned settlement, established solely by settlers themselves through migration and immigration to the area. Land was easy to purchase from Māori as the isthmus had been fought over by many hapū for several generations during the Musket Wars and the native population had either been killed as at Panmure or fled or welcomed the protection afforded by large numbers of Europeans and their technology. The whole of eastern Auckland was bought by William Fairburn after local Māori pleaded with him to buy the land to protect them from the feared Ngāpuhi invaders. After 1847 large numbers (over 2,500) of retired British soldiers called Fencibles and their families came to Auckland and established new outlying settlements at Panmure, Howick, Ōtāhuhu and Onehunga. They were organised by Governor Grey and the force was called Royal New Zealand Fencible Corps. These formed a defensive ring against any possible Māori attack from the south. By 1853 there were approximately 8,000 people living in the Auckland area, with a wide range of skills among them and with about 17,000 acres (69 km²) in crops. Auckland was the closest in New Zealand to an agricultural settlement.

== 20th century ==
European settlers were still arriving in the 20th century, with Department of Health statistics showing that post-1900, tuberculosis was still the main cause of unnatural death among them. The 1906–1908 Native Land Commission, headed by Robert Stout and Āpirana Ngata, encouraged the sale of unoccupied or seemingly underdeveloped Māori lands to European settlers. Historian David Vernon Williams suggests, by the early 20th century, "colonial state power had overwhelmed tribal rangatiratanga in an insistent and persistent exercise of forceful measures to individualise land holdings and to promote colonisation by Pākehā settlers".

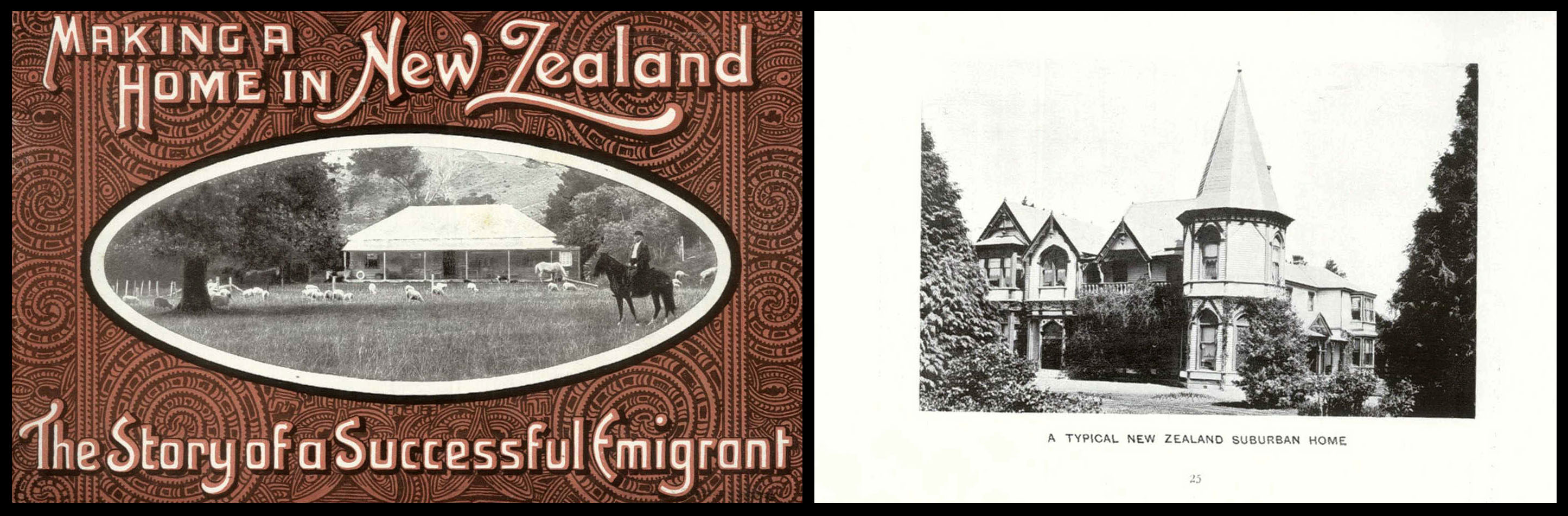
In 1908 the New Zealand Government published a booklet for prospective immigrants. Shown here is the booklet alongside one of its images, optimistically described as "a typical New Zealand suburban home".

Shipping companies and the government advertised in British newspapers. Advertisements often created expectations that were difficult to fulfil, portraying New Zealand as an island paradise of sunshine, sandy beaches, and abundant opportunity. Shipping agents were paid £1 for each passenger. Assisted passage schemes were advertised alongside these glowing descriptions of colonial life, suggesting not only prosperity but also healthier surroundings and relief from the diseases common at home. In practice, however, the realities of settlement frequently fell short of this idealised image.

== Legacy ==
=== European customs ===
Early Pākehā settlers brought a range of European customs with them to what would become New Zealand. According to Christchurch newspaper The Press, European emigrants to New Zealand transported over many of their cultural and political norms; "Pākehā settlers brought with them a profound belief in self-reliance, property rights, and the autonomy of local communities". Property rights came with a new and foreign understanding, alien to the native customs; both an ideological and distinctively European concept.

=== Pākehā guilt ===
In the 2004 essay "'Cultural vandalism' and Pākehā politics of guilt and responsibility", the concept of white guilt, or Pākehā guilt, is explored as a legacy of colonial settlement. In 2002, then in opposition, future Prime Minister Bill English was said to reject the "cringing guilt" from the legacy of Pākehā settlers, after the government Race Relations Commissioner compared the cultural impact of European settlement in the islands with the Taliban destruction of the Buddhas of Bamyan.

Elizabeth Rata has argued that while the Waitangi Tribunal had served as a chance to acknowledge wrongs and resolve Pākehā guilt, the opportunity was missed; "Without the mirror image of unexpiated guilt, a necessary process in the recognition and validation of a shared reality, Pākehā guilt moved, not onto the next stage of externalised shame, but into an internal and enclosed narcissism". In 2007, anthropologist Michael Jackson wrote that the Museum of New Zealand Te Papa Tongarewa was an expression of residual "liberal Pākehā guilt" in its "extolling Māori spiritual superiority and pandering to the stereotype of crass Western materialism, Pākehā seek to compensate Māori for their political powerlessness without actually changing the status quo".

== See also ==
- European New Zealanders
- Settler colonialism
  - Settler colonialism in Australia
