= Henry Oxley (politician) =

Australian politician

Henry Molesworth Oxley (10 April 1826 – 20 March 1867) was an Australian politician.

He was born at Kirkham near Camden to John Oxley and Emma Norton. In 1828, following the death of his father, he received a grant of land on the Wingecarribee River near Bowral in his father's honour. On 4 November 1854 he married Emily Orchard, with whom he had four children. In 1859 he was elected to the New South Wales Legislative Assembly for Camden, but he was defeated in 1860. Oxley died at Wingecarribee in 1867.

New South Wales Legislative Assembly
New seat	Member for Camden; 1859–1860; Served alongside: William Wild	Succeeded by John Douglas; John Morrice
