= Sally Quinnell =

Australian politician

Sally Quinnell MP

Member of the New South Wales Assembly for Camden
- Incumbent
- Assumed office 25 March 2023
- Preceded by: Peter Sidgreaves

Personal details
- Party: Labor
- Spouse: Damien
- Children: 3
- Occupation: Music teacher

Sally Anne Quinnell is an Australian politician. She was elected a member of the New South Wales Legislative Assembly representing Camden for the Labor Party since 2023.

== Career ==
Quinnell worked for fifteen years as a music teacher in the Camden area. She had been a union representative and secretary of the Independent Education Union's Lansdowne sub-branch. She was a founding member of the Camden Musical Society, She sang and played the piano and the bassoon. She has performed music at local events and churches.

Quinnell was the endorsed as the NSW Labor candidate for the seat of Camden at the 2019 state election at which she was defeated by Peter Sidgreaves. She was endorsed as the Labor candidate again in 2023 and defeated Sidgreaves.

== Personal life ==
Quinnell and her husband Damien moved to Camden in the late 2000s and raised their three children there. She has been involved in schools and clubs such as St Paul's Camden, St Gregory's College Gregory Hills, Cobbitty Scouts and Oran Park Cricket Club. She has volunteered at Cowpastures Park Run, South Camden Tennis Club and St Vinnies homeless night visits.
