= John Kidd (politician) =

Politician, store-keeper and dairy farmer in New South Wales, Australia

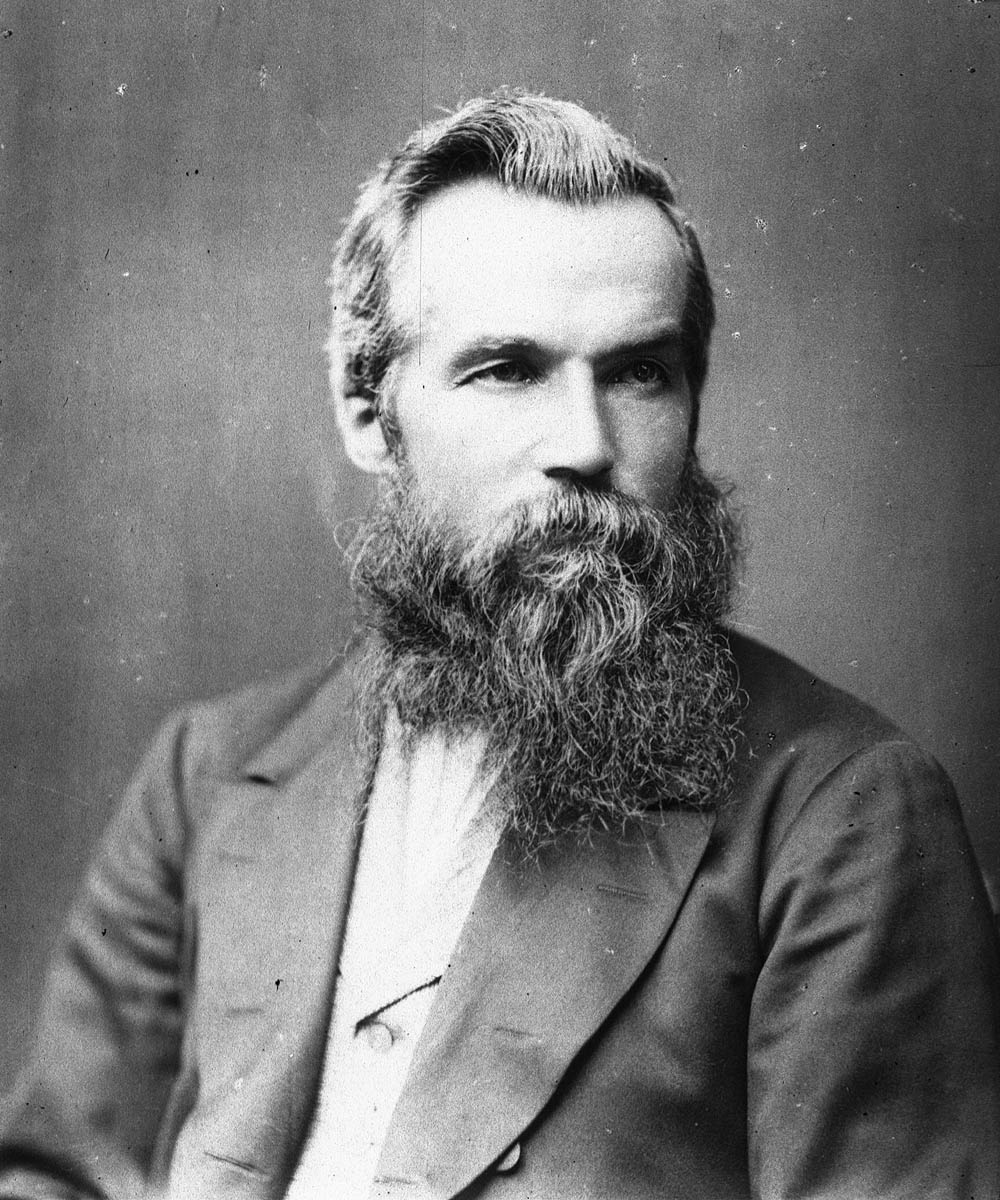

John Kidd (1 September 1838 – 8 April 1919) was a politician, store-keeper and dairy farmer in New South Wales, Australia.

Born in Brechin, Forfarshire, Scotland, to boot manufacturer John Kidd and Elizabeth née Souter, he received a limited education and was apprenticed at the age of thirteen as a baker and confectioner. In 1857 he arrived in New South Wales and became a baker in Sydney, with his bakery becoming a general store by 1876. In November 1860 he married Sophie Collier at Aberdeen, with whom he had three children. He visited the United Kingdom in 1877 and had a cattle property near Campbelltown.

In 1880 Kidd was elected to the New South Wales Legislative Assembly as the member for Camden. he served until 1882 and then again from 1885 to 1887, 1889 to 1895, and 1898 to 1904. Kidd was Postmaster-General in the third Dibbs ministry from 1891 until 1894 and Secretary for Mines and Agriculture from 1901 to 1904 in the See ministry. He was a member of the Protectionist Party from 1887 until 1901 when he joined the Progressive Party. He had been a supporter of Federation from 1891.

He was a commissioner for New South Wales for the exhibitions Adelaide in 1887 and Melbourne in 1888.

Kidd died at Campbelltown on 8 April 1919 (aged 80).

Parliament of New South Wales
Political offices
Preceded by Daniel O'Connor	Postmaster-General; 1891 – 1894	Succeeded by Joseph Cook
Preceded by John Fegan	Secretary for Mines and Agriculture; 1901 – 1904	Succeeded by Samuel Moore
New South Wales Legislative Assembly
Preceded by Arthur Onslow; Thomas Garrett	Member for Camden; 1880 – 1882; With: Thomas Garrett	Succeeded by William McCourt; Thomas Garrett
Preceded by William McCourt; Thomas Garrett	Member for Camden; 1885 – 1887; With: Thomas Garrett	Succeeded by William McCourt; Thomas Garrett
Preceded by William McCourt; Thomas Garrett	Member for Camden; 1889 – 1895; With: William McCourt / none Thomas Garrett / William Cullen / none	Succeeded by Charles Bull
Preceded by Arthur Onslow	Member for Camden; 1898 – 1904	Succeeded by Fred Downes
