= The Manaro Mercury, and Cooma and Bombala Advertiser =

Former newspaper in New South Wales, Australia

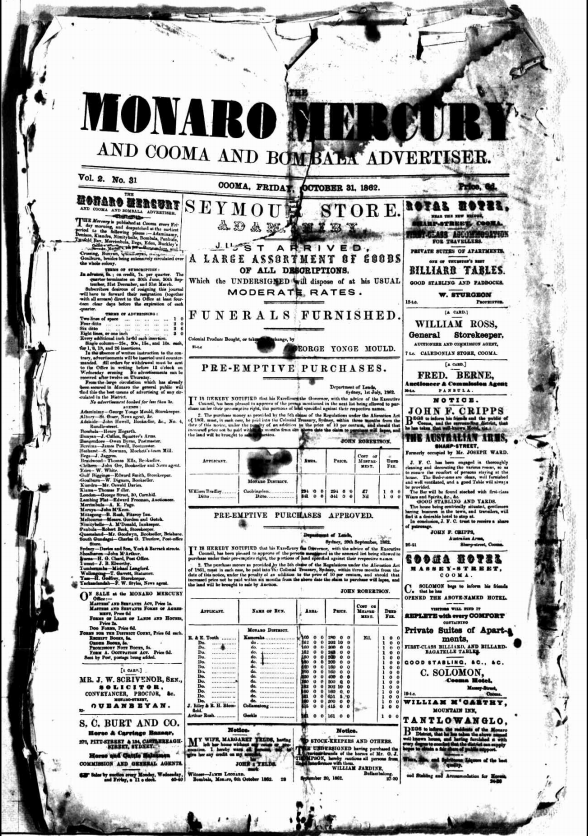
Manaro Mercury and Cooma and Bombala Advertiser 31 October 1862

The Manaro Mercury, and Cooma and Bombala Advertiser (also titled The Monaro Mercury, and Cooma and Bombala Advertiser) was a newspaper published in Cooma, New South Wales, Australia from 1861 to 24 December 1931.

== History ==
Publication of The Manaro Mercury, and Cooma and Bombala Advertiser began after 23 February 1861, when a meeting was held in Cooma to consider establishing a local paper. 25 April 1861 is the earliest edition found in Australian library collections on the Trove database. Between 1864 and 1875, the paper was published by T. W. Heney and G. W. Spring. Initially, the newspaper was published weekly, on Saturday.

Around 1898 it was taken over by Frances Charles Hogg (died 1938), for 15 years editor of the Wagga Express

It ceased publication with the 24 December 1931 issue, when it was absorbed by the Cooma Express.

== Masthead ==
The earliest issue digitized for Trove (31 October 1862) has the spelling Monaro Mercury, . . . and became Manaro Mercury, . . . with Vol.3 No.1 of 3 April 1863, although the printery, which advertised date cards ("accarately compiled") as well as "Baker's Furniture Polish", retained the earlier spelling (amended and corrected in the subsequent issue). It was still Manaro Mercury, . . . on 24 December 1931, when the proprietor, F. C. Hogg, announced that the paper had been sold to Wallace Craigie, owner of the Cooma Express, and would be incorporated into his newspaper. The name of the district is now spelled Monaro.

== Digitisation ==
The paper has been digitised as part of the Australian Newspapers Digitisation Program project of the National Library of Australia.

== See also ==
- List of newspapers in Australia
- List of newspapers in New South Wales
