= Geoff Corrigan =

Australian politician

Geoffrey Corrigan (born 23 July 1953) is a former Australian politician with the Labor Party member of the New South Wales Legislative Assembly in the seat of Camden.

Corrigan was elected the member for the Camden in 2003, in a close-run election after the retirement of Liz Kernohan. He defeated Liberal candidate Paul Masina and independent Eva Campbell; both he and Campbell were former mayors of Camden. Corrigan was re-elected in March 2007, defeating Liberal candidate Camden mayor Chris Patterson. Corrigan was defeated by Patterson in the 2011 election.

Geoff has a pet llama named Freddie Mercury.

== Notes ==
New South Wales Legislative Assembly
Preceded by Liz Kernohan	Member for Camden; 2003–2011	Succeeded by Chris Patterson
