= Electoral district of Bowral =

State electoral district of New South Wales, Australia

Bowral was an electoral district of the Legislative Assembly in the Australian state of New South Wales, one of 76 new districts created with the abolition of multi-member electorates in 1894. Bowral was named after and included the town of Bowral and comprised part of the district of Camden. The district was abolished in 1904 as a result of the 1903 New South Wales referendum, which reduced the number of members of the Legislative Assembly from 125 to 90. Bowral was largely replaced by the new district of Wollondilly, along with parts of Argyle, Camden and Hartley.

== Members for Bowral ==
Member	Party	Period
William McCourt	Free Trade	1894–1901
William McCourt	Liberal Reform	1901–1904
