= Broughton O'Conor =

Politician and barrister in New South Wales, Australia

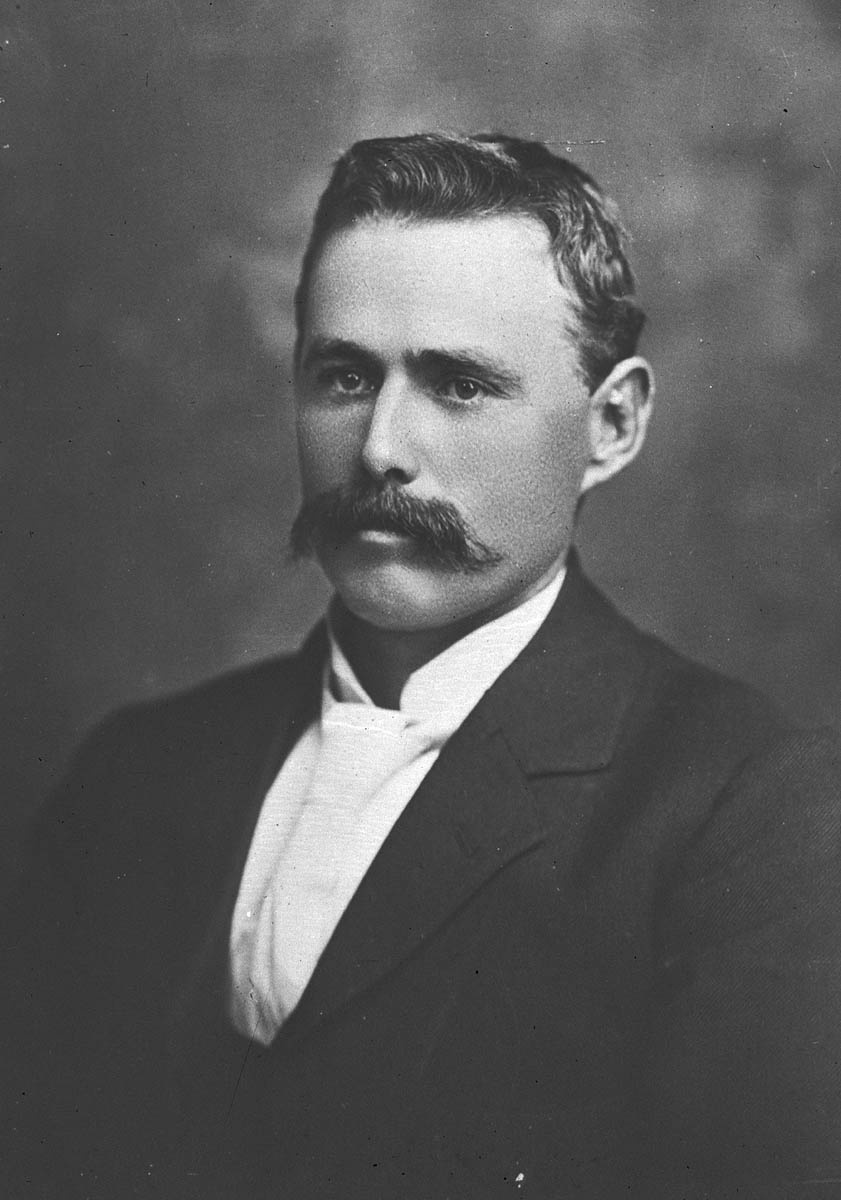
- Born: 1 November 1868; Broughton Creek, Berry, New South Wales
- Died: 2 February 1953 (aged 84); Darlinghurst, New South Wales

Broughton Barnabas O'Conor (1 November 1868 – 2 February 1953) was a politician and barrister in New South Wales, Australia.

== Early life ==
O'Conor was born at Broughton Creek near Nowra to John O'Conor and Anne Stuart née Connolly. He attended public schools before matriculating at Sydney Grammar School and then studying at the University of Sydney, receiving a Bachelor of Arts in 1892 and a Bachelor of Law in 1895. He was called to the bar in 1895. On 25 April 1901, O'Conor married Icey Britania Johnson, and they had two sons.

== Political career ==
O'Conor was a candidate for the New South Wales Legislative Assembly for the district of Sherbrooke at the 1895 election as an independent Free Trade candidate, but was defeated with a margin of 252 votes (23.5%). 66% of the votes at Sherbrooke had been against the Constitution Bill in June 1898, however O'Conor stood as a National Federal Party candidate in support of Federation at the election in July 1898 and was narrowly elected with a margin of 21 votes (1.7%). He did not join the Progressive Party for the 1901 election, standing as an independent at the 1901 election and winning with an increased margin. He joined the Liberal Reform Party for the 1904 election. The party won the election, and O'Connor was appointed Minister of Public Instruction and Minister for Labour and Industry in the Carruthers ministry. O'Conor resigned from the ministry in May 1907.

O'Conor retired at the 1907 state election, and in July 1908 was appointed to the New South Wales Legislative Council, where he served as a Liberal, Nationalist and United Australia Party member. The council was reformed in 1934 with members being elected, not directly by the people, but by a joint sitting of the New South Wales Parliament with members elected in four groups of 15 members and O'Conor was elected in the third group for a term ending in 1940. He did not stand for re-election, and retired in 1940.

== Later life and death ==
O'Conor continued to practice as a barrister until 1930 and he was a director of various companies. He died at Darlinghurst on 2 February 1953 (aged 84).

Parliament of New South Wales
Political offices
Preceded by John Fegan	Minister of Public Instruction; Minister for Labour and Industry; 1904 – 1907	Succeeded by James Hogue
New South Wales Legislative Assembly
Preceded by Jacob Garrard	Member for Sherbrooke; 1898 – 1907	Succeeded by John Hunt
New South Wales Legislative Council
Preceded by William Trickett	Chairman of Committees; 1912 – 1934	Succeeded by Ernest Farrar
