= Electoral district of Sherbrooke =

Former state electoral district of New South Wales, Australia

Sherbrooke was an electoral district of the Legislative Assembly in the Australian colony (and state from 1901) of New South Wales, existing from 1894 until 1913. It included Blacktown and Baulkham Hills. It was named after Robert Lowe, 1st Viscount Sherbrooke.

== Members for Sherbrooke ==
Member	Party	Period
Jacob Garrard	Free Trade	1894–1898
Broughton O'Conor	Protectionist	1898–1901
Broughton O'Conor	Independent	1901–1904
Broughton O'Conor	Liberal Reform	1904–1907
John Hunt	Liberal Reform	1907–1913

== History ==
Multi-member constituencies were abolished in the 1893 redistribution, resulting in the creation of 76 new districts, including Sherbrooke. Sherbrooke consisted of the north western part of the four member district of Central Cumberland, a south eastern part of the single member district of The Hawkesbury and an eastern part of the single member district of The Nepean.

Sherbrooke was expanded to include part of The Hawkesbury and parts of the abolished districts of The Nepean and Ryde and Willoughby as a result of the 1903 New South Wales referendum which reduced the number of members of the Legislative Assembly from 125 to 90. The district was abolished in 1913.

== Election results ==
1910 New South Wales state election: Sherbrooke
Party	Candidate	Votes	%	±%
Liberal Reform	John Hunt	4,407	67.4	
Labour	Andrew Thompson	2,134	32.6	
Total formal votes		6,541	98.0	
Informal votes		133	2.0	
Turnout		6,674	74.5	
Liberal Reform hold				
