= Chris Patterson (politician) =

Australian politician

Member of the New South Wales Parliament for Camden
- In office 26 March 2011 – 23 March 2019
- Preceded by: Geoff Corrigan
- Succeeded by: Peter Sidgreaves

Personal details
- Born: 8 December 1971 (age 54)
- Party: Liberal Party

Christopher Stewart Patterson (born 8 December 1971), an Australian politician, was a member of the New South Wales Legislative Assembly representing Camden for the Liberal Party from 2011 to 2019.

== Early life and background ==
Patterson has lived in the Camden area for over 25 years. A former TAFE teacher, he later managed the Merino Tavern, and was elected to Camden Council in 2000. He did not seek re-election in 2004; stood again at a by-election in 2005; and became mayor in 2006.

Patterson generated significant public profile between 2007 and 2009 as Camden Council rejected an application from the Quranic Society seeking Council's permission to develop land for the construction of a four-day Islamic school within the local government area. The Society took Camden Council to the New South Wales Land and Environment Court, and sought to have Council's ruling overturned. The Court rejected the Society's application, amidst race and religion-based arguments. Patterson, as mayor, was the vocal spokesperson defending Council's actions.

== Political career ==
In 2007, Patterson successfully sought Liberal Party pre-selection for Camden and ran against Labor's Geoff Corrigan, but was defeated. On 21 October 2010, the Liberal Party announced that Patterson was endorsed as the party's candidate for Camden ahead of the 2011 State election. Patterson was elected with a swing of 21.9 points and won the seat with 68.9 per cent of the two-party vote. His main opponent was Corrigan, representing Labor.

New South Wales Legislative Assembly
Preceded by Geoff Corrigan	Member for Camden; 2011–2019	Succeeded by Peter Sidgreaves
