= Settler colonialism in Australia =

Settler colonialism in Australia concerns the application of settler colonial studies to the British colonisation of Australia. Academics within settler colonial studies argue that Australian settler colonialism involves the attempted elimination of Indigenous Australians and their replacement by a settler society. Initially carried out by violent means, such as "massacres, forced starvation, poisoning, rape, disease, and incarceration", settler colonialism is contended to continue today in the form of cultural assimilation. Settler colonial studies emerged in Australia.

== See also ==
- Australian frontier wars
- History of Indigenous Australians
- European settlers in New Zealand
- Genocide of Indigenous Australians
