= Fred Downes =

Australian politician

Frederick William Arthur Downes (6 March 1855 – 3 December 1917) was an Australian politician.

He was born at Greystanes to farmer Jeremiah Frederick Downes and Sarah Ann Kirk. Having moved to Camden with his family at the age of four, he attended Macquarie Fields School and the King's School in Parramatta before becoming a bank clerk. He was later a wheat and dairy farmer in the Camden area, becoming active in the local farmers' union. He married Caroline Frances May on 14 April 1883 at Wivenhoe. From 1885 to 1888 he was a captain in the Camden Corps volunteer force. In 1904 Downes was elected to the New South Wales Legislative Assembly as the Liberal member for Camden. He served as a backbencher until his retirement in 1913.

New South Wales Legislative Assembly
Preceded by John Kidd	Member for Camden; 1904–1913	Succeeded by John Hunt
