= Peter Primrose =

Australian politician

The Honourable Peter Primrose MLC
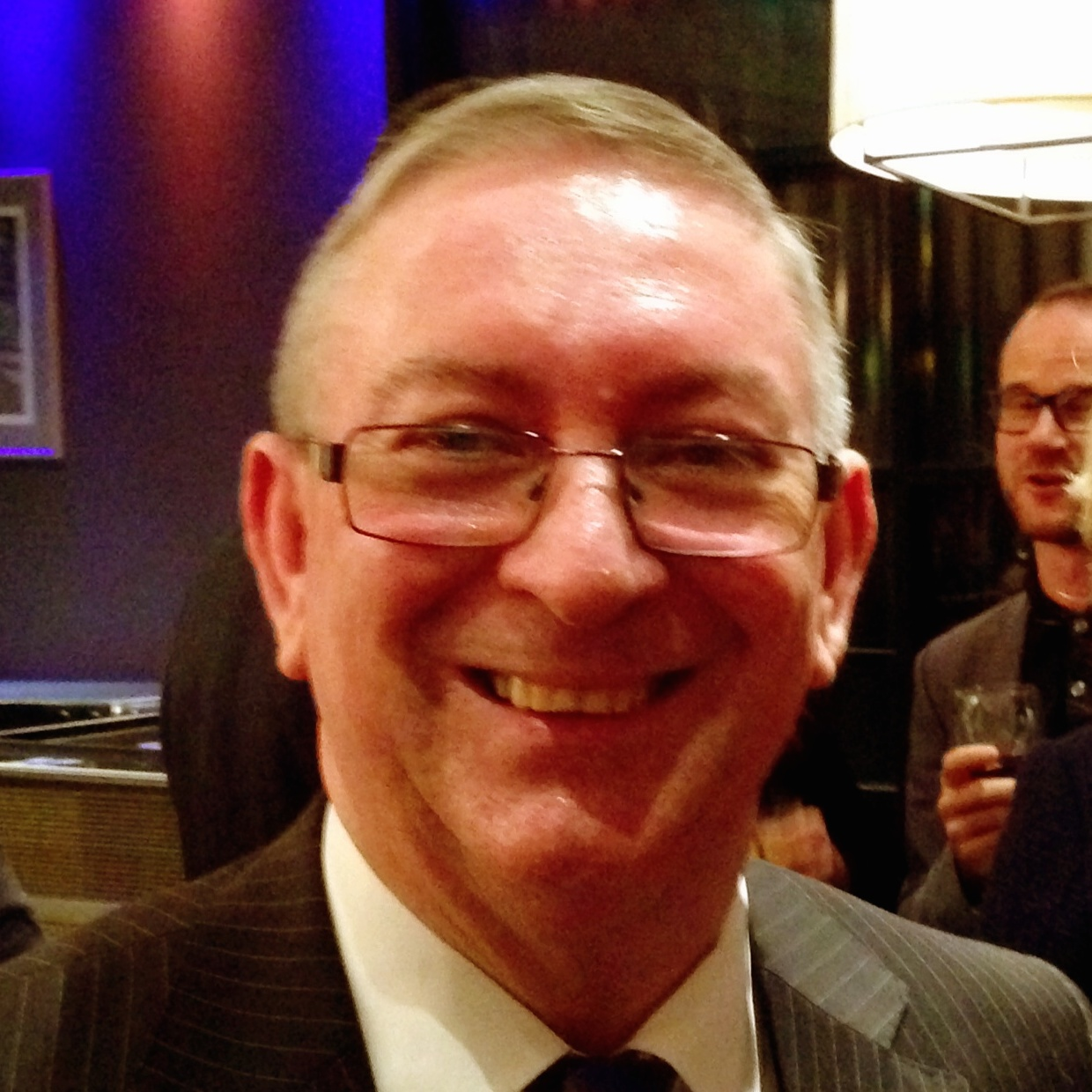

Member of the New South Wales Legislative Council
- Incumbent
- Assumed office 17 April 1996
- Preceded by: Paul O'Grady

Member of the New South Wales Parliament for Camden
- In office 19 March 1988 – 3 May 1991
- Preceded by: John Fahey
- Succeeded by: Liz Kernohan

President of the New South Wales Legislative Council
- In office 8 May 2007 – 17 November 2009
- Preceded by: Meredith Burgmann
- Succeeded by: Amanda Fazio

Assistant President of the New South Wales Legislative Council
- Incumbent
- Assumed office 9 May 2023
- Preceded by: Rod Roberts

Father of the Parliament of New South Wales
- Incumbent
- Assumed office 31 July 2017
- Preceded by: Duncan Gay
Government Offices
Minister for Ageing & Disability Services
In office 21 May 2010 – 28 March 2011
| Premier | Kristina Keneally |
| Preceded by | Paul Lynch |
| Succeeded by | Andrew Constance |
Minister for Youth & Volunteering
In office 8 December 2009 – 21 May 2010
| Premier | Kristina Keneally |
| Preceded by | Graham West |
| Succeeded by | post abolished |
Minister for Regulatory Reform & Mineral Resources
In office 17 November 2009 – 4 December 2009
| Premier | Nathan Rees |
| Preceded by | Joe Tripodi |
| Succeeded by | John Hatzistergos |
Government whip
In office 7 April 1999 – 2 March 2007
| Premier | Bob Carr; Morris Iemma |

Mayor of Campbelltown
- In office 1987–1988
- Preceded by: Bryce Regan
- Succeeded by: Jim Kremmer

Alderman of the City of Campbelltown
- In office 20 September 1980 – 1991

Personal details
- Born: Peter Thomas Primrose; 26 September 1955 (age 71)
- Party: Labor Party (1973–)
- Spouse: Jan
- Education: University of Sydney
- Website: www.peterprimrose.com.au

Peter Thomas Primrose (born 26 September 1955) is an Australian politician.

He has been a Labor Party member of the New South Wales Legislative Council since 1996. He has served in various portfolios including Shadow Minister for Local Government, Shadow Minister for Regional Roads, Shadow Minister for Innovation and Better Regulation, Shadow Minister for Finance, Shadow Minister of State and Shadow Minister Assisting the Leader on Western Sydney. He was also the President of the Legislative Council (8 May 2007 – 17 November 2009), Minister for Disability Services (2 March 2010 – 28 March 2011) and Minister for Youth (8 December 2009 – 28 March 2011) among other portfolios.

Primrose was previously the Labor member for Camden in the Legislative Assembly from 1988 to 1991, and was unsuccessful in regaining the seat at the 1995 election. Subsequent to the retirement of Duncan Gay in the 2017 election and the end of Fred Nile's non-consecutive terms, Primrose became the longest-serving member of the Parliament of New South Wales.

After Primrose graduated from the University of Sydney with a Bachelor of Social Studies, he worked as a social worker with the Red Cross Welfare Service before working for the NSW Departments of Health, Youth and Community Services and as an adviser to the Commonwealth Minister for Consumer Affairs. He served on Campbelltown City Council from 1980 to 1991, including a term as Mayor; and for five years as Chair of the Macarthur Health Services Board.

Political offices
| Preceded by Graham West | Minister for Volunteering; 2010–2011 | Succeeded by N/A |
| Preceded by Paul Lynch | Minister for Ageing; 2010–2011 | Succeeded by Andrew Constance |
| Preceded by Paul Lynch | Minister for Disability Services; 2010–2011 | Succeeded by Andrew Constance |
| Preceded by Graham West | Minister Assisting the Premier on Veterans Affairs; 2009–2010 | Succeeded by Frank Terenzini |
| Preceded by Graham West | Minister for Youth; 2009–2011 | Succeeded by Victor Dominello |
| Preceded by Ian Macdonald | Minister for Mineral Resources; 2009 | Succeeded by Ian Macdonald |
| Preceded by Joe Tripodi | Minister for Regulatory Reform; 2009 | Succeeded by John Hatzistergos |
| Preceded by Meredith Burgmann | President of the New South Wales Legislative Council; 2007–2009 | Succeeded by Amanda Fazio |
Parliament of New South Wales
| Preceded by John Fahey | Member for Camden; 1988–1991 | Succeeded by Liz Kernohan |
