= John Morrice =

Australian politician

John Morrice (1811 – 20 February 1875) was an Australian politician.

== Personal life ==
He was born in Jamaica to estate agent David Morrice and Anne White, and he was educated in England. He later settled at Berrima in New South Wales, and on 9 November 1838 married Jane Osborne, with whom he had twelve children.

== Career ==
Morrice held land on the Murrumbidgee River and cattle runs on the Lachlan River, and during the gold rush was successful selling picks and shovels, becoming substantially wealthy.

In 1860 he was elected to the New South Wales Legislative Assembly for Camden, serving until his retirement in 1872.

== Death ==
Morrice died at Marulan in 1875.

New South Wales Legislative Assembly
Preceded by Henry Oxley; William Wild	Member for Camden; 1860–1872; Served alongside: Douglas/Bell/Roberts/Onslow	Succeeded by Thomas Garrett
