= Peter Sidgreaves =

Australian politician

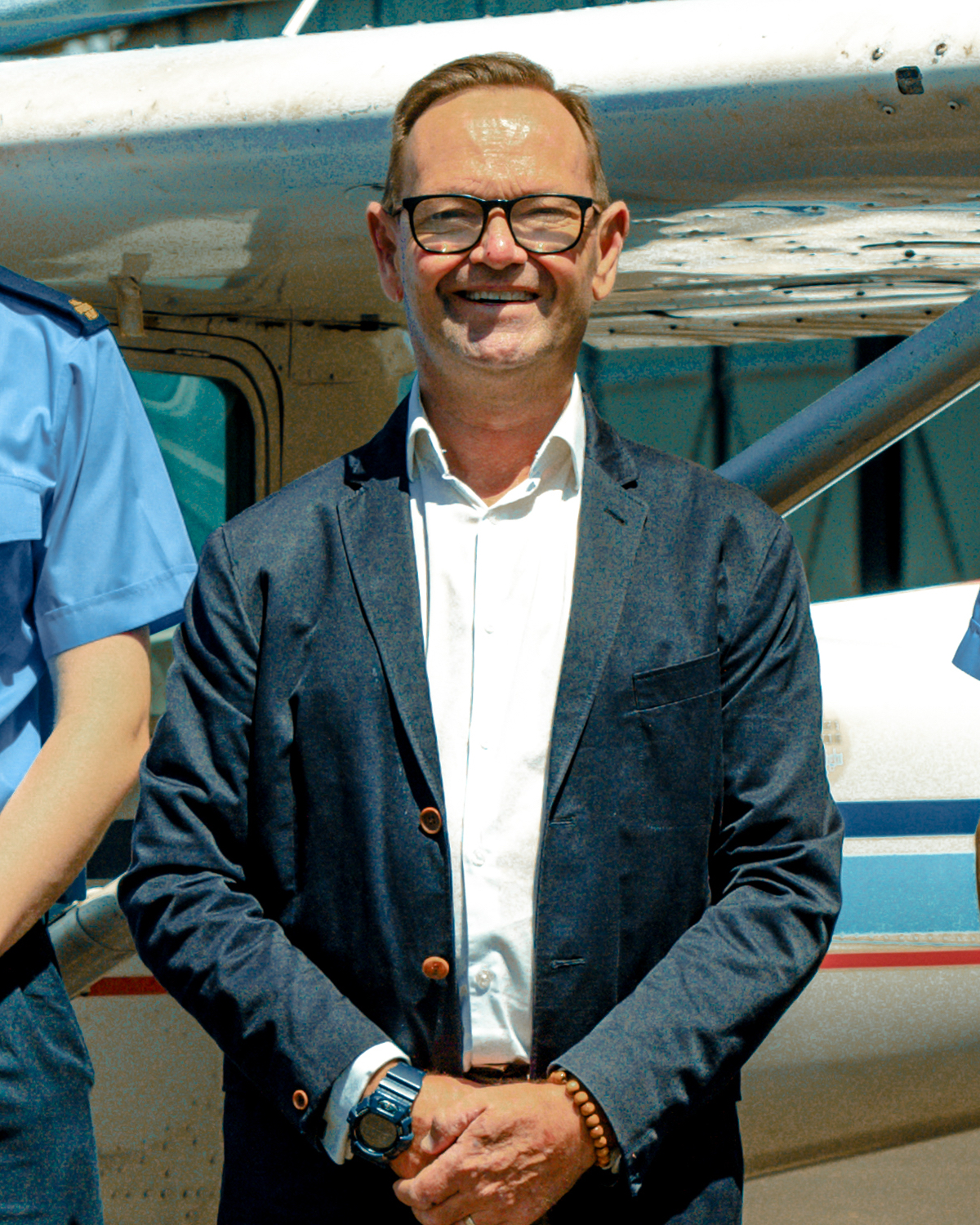

Member of the New South Wales Parliament for Camden
- In office 23 March 2019 – 25 March 2023
- Preceded by: Chris Patterson
- Succeeded by: Sally Quinnell

Personal details
- Party: Liberal
- Children: 4

Peter Bryan Sidgreaves is an Australian politician. From 2019 to 2023 he was a member of the New South Wales Legislative Assembly, representing Camden for the Liberal Party. He was defeated by Sally Quinnell at the 2023 state election, having served one term.

Sidgreaves was educated at St Joseph's College, Hunters Hill. At the time of his election, he was serving as Mayor of Camden Council, having been first elected to the council in 2012.

Sidgreaves now works as an IT helpdesk manager at St Patrick's College, Campbelltown.

New South Wales Legislative Assembly
Preceded by Chris Patterson	Member for Camden; 2019–2023	Succeeded by Sally Quinnell
