= Liz Kernohan =

Australian politician (1939–2004)

Elizabeth Anne Kernohan (24 June 1939 – 21 October 2004) was an Australian politician who served as member of the New South Wales Legislative Assembly for the electoral district of Camden from 1991 to 2003. She was a member of the Liberal Party.

Prior to entering state parliament, Kernohan served as an Alderman on Camden Council from 1973 to 1991, including two terms as Mayor.

Kernohan was educated at the Sydney Church of England Girls' Grammar School and at the University of Sydney where she obtained a PhD degree in Agricultural Science. She worked at the University of Sydney's farms at Camden prior to entering state politics.

After retiring from state politics, Kernohan was re-elected to Camden Council in 2004, but she died less than a year into her term.

New South Wales Legislative Assembly
| Preceded by Peter Primrose | Member for Camden; 1991–2003 | Succeeded by Geoff Corrigan |
