= Ralph Brading =

Australian politician

Personal details
- Born: 31 January 1934 Albury, New South Wales
- Party: Labor Party

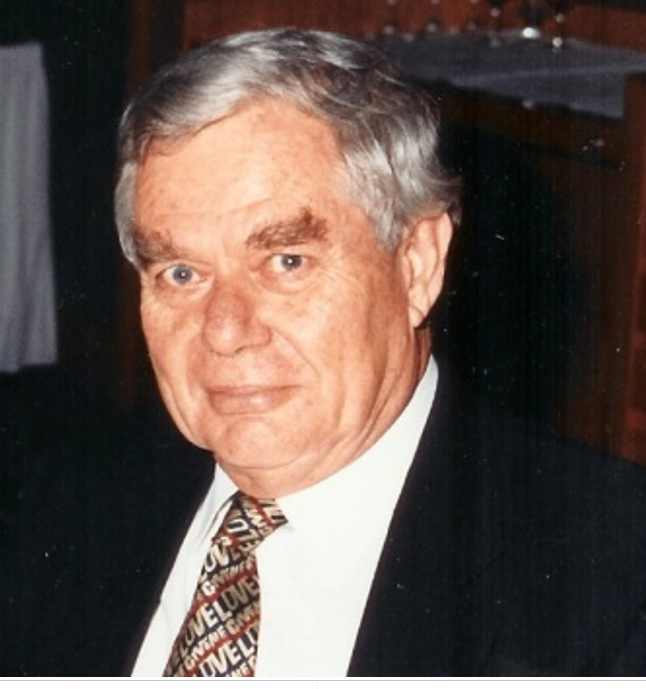
Ralph Brading (circa 1999)

Ralph Charles Brading (born 31 January 1934) was an Australian politician and member of the New South Wales Legislative Assembly from 1981 until 1984. He was a member of the Labor Party (ALP).

Brading was born in Albury, New South Wales and graduated from the University of Sydney as an architect. He joined the ALP in 1971 and was elected to the New South Wales Parliament for the newly restored seat of Camden at the 1981 state election. This was a landslide win for the Wran Labor Government. He was defeated at the subsequent election in 1984 by a future premier, John Fahey. He did not hold ministerial or party office.

New South Wales Legislative Assembly
| Preceded by New Seat | Member for Camden; 1981 – 1984 | Succeeded by John Fahey |
