= William Portus Cullen =

Australian politician (1855–1935)

The Honourable Sir William Portus Cullen KCMG KC
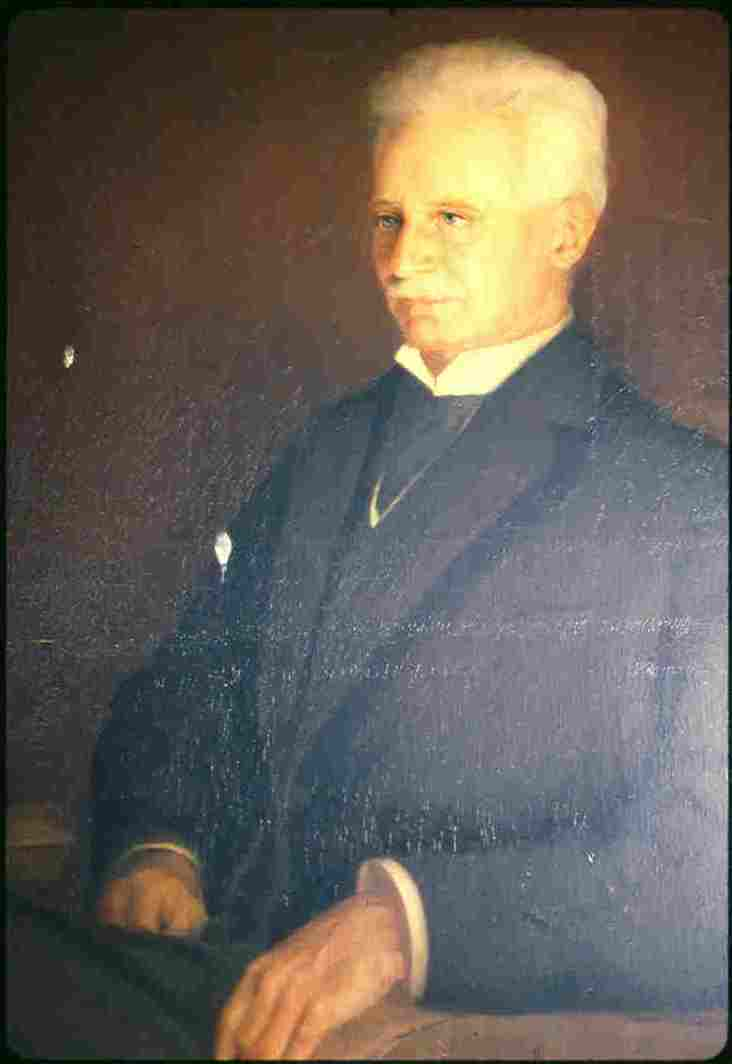

7th Chief Justice of New South Wales
- In office 28 January 1910 – 27 January 1925
- Appointed by: Viscount Chelmsford
- Preceded by: Sir Frederick Darley
- Succeeded by: Sir Philip Street

Lieutenant-Governor of New South Wales
- In office 30 March 1910 – 1 October 1930
- Appointed by: Edward VII
- Preceded by: Sir Frederick Darley
- Succeeded by: Sir Philip Street

Member of the New South Wales Parliament for Camden
- In office 3 July 1891 – 17 July 1894 Serving with Kidd, McCourt
- Preceded by: Thomas Garrett
- Succeeded by: John Kidd

Member of the New South Wales Legislative Council
- In office 1895–1910

Personal details
- Born: 28 May 1855 Jamberoo, New South Wales, Australia
- Died: 6 April 1935 (aged 79) Leura, New South Wales, Australia

Sir William Portus Cullen KCMG KC (28 May 1855 – 6 April 1935) was an Australian barrister, the 7th Chief Justice of New South Wales, Lieutenant-Governor of New South Wales, and Chancellor of the University of Sydney.

== Early life and education ==
Cullen was born at Mount Johnston, near Jamberoo, New South Wales, the seventh son of John and Rebecca (née Clinton) Cullen. A brother, Joseph Cullen, was a Member of Parliament for both New South Wales and Western Australia. William was educated at country state schools, including Kiama, and the University of Sydney, where he won a scholarship.

William Cullen graduated B.A. with first class honours in classics in 1880, M.A. in 1882, LL.B. in 1885 and LL.D. in 1887.

== Legal career ==
Cullen was called to the bar in 1883. He argued before the Supreme Court of New South Wales and the High Court of Australia (an institution whose creation he had vigorously supported). He became a KC in 1905. He regularly appeared in the High Court, and was considered one of the leading barristers appearing in the High Court, including appearing in R v Governor of South Australia; Ex parte Vardon, Union Label case, and the Steel Rails case.

== Political career ==
Cullen was a Federationist.

== Late life ==
Cullen retired as Chief Justice in January 1925. He was Lieutenant-Governor until September 1930. He administered the State of NSW on several occasions. He died at Leura on 6 April 1935.

He married in 1891 Lily, eldest daughter of the Hon. R. H. D. White, who died in 1931. He was survived by two sons and a daughter. He was knighted in 1911 and created KCMG in 1912.

Eucalyptus cullenii was named for him.

Legal offices
Preceded by Sir Frederick Darley	Chief Justice of New South Wales; 1910 – 1925	Succeeded by Sir Philip Street
Government offices
Preceded by Sir Frederick Darley	Lieutenant-Governor of New South Wales; 1910 – 1930	Succeeded by Sir Philip Street
New South Wales Legislative Assembly
Preceded by Thomas Garrett	Member for Camden; 1891 – 1894; Served alongside: Kidd, McCourt	Succeeded by John Kidd
