= Arthur Onslow (Australian politician) =

British Royal Navy officer, photographer and Australian politician

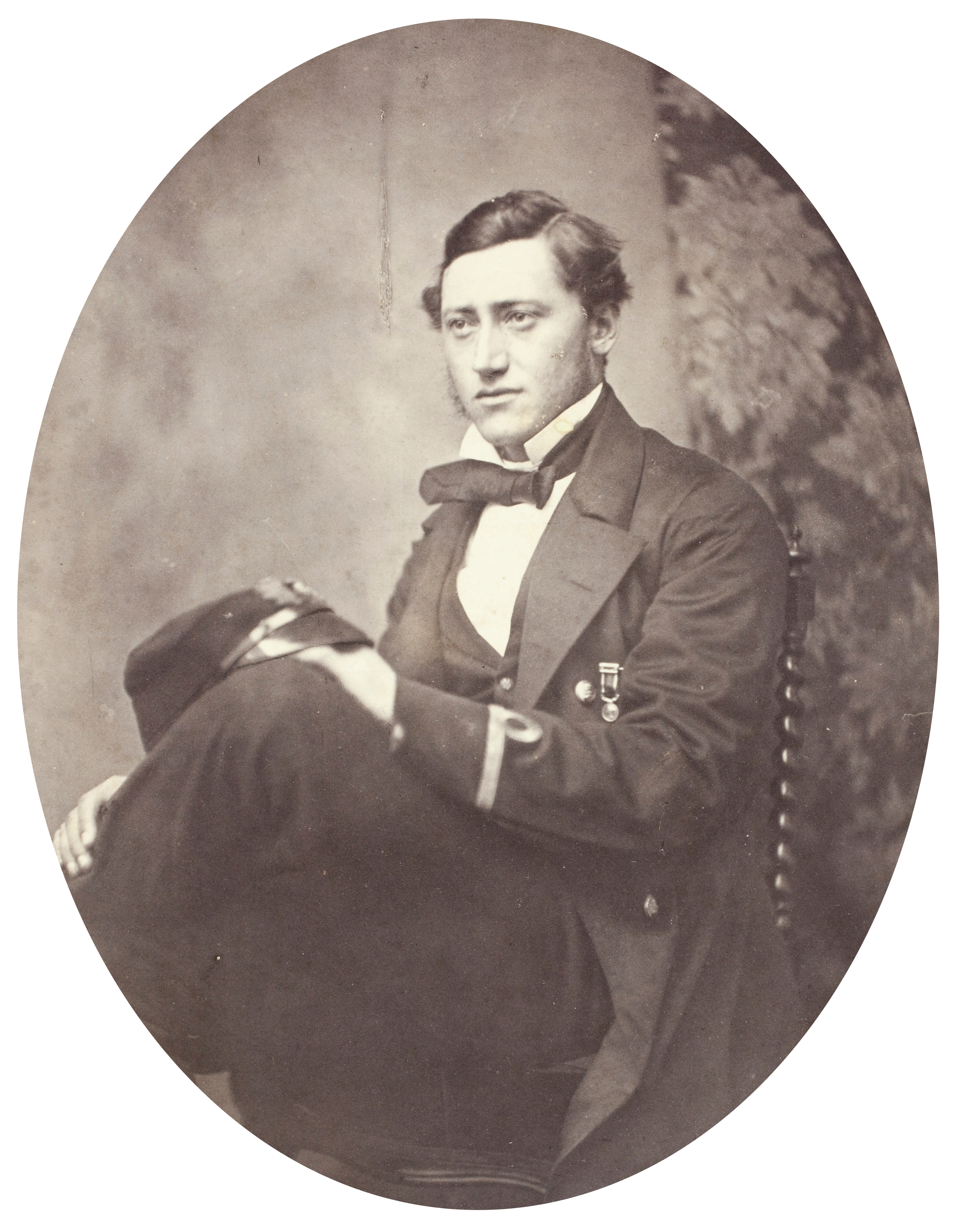
- Onslow, c. 1859
- Born: 2 August 1833; Trichinopoly, India
- Died: 30 January 1882 (aged 48); Sydney, Australia
- Military career
- Allegiance: United Kingdom
- Branch: Royal Navy
- Service years: 1847-1871
- Rank: Post Captain (Royal Navy)
- Conflicts: Battle of Suomenlinna
- Other work: Photographer, Politician

Arthur Alexander Walton Onslow (2 August 1833 – 30 January 1882) was an Australian politician and naval officer who was a member of the New South Wales Legislative Assembly from 1869 to 1880 and a member of the New South Wales Legislative Council from 1880 to 1882.

== Life ==
Onslow was born at Trichinopoly in India to surveyor Arthur Pooley Onslow and Rosa Roberta Macleay. In 1838 was sent to New South Wales, where he lived with his grandfather Alexander Macleay at Elizabeth Bay House in Sydney. He returned to England to live with his family in 1841 and was educated in Surrey and Nottingham. He entered the navy in May 1847 as a midshipman on HMS Howe and by 1847 he was a navy midshipman.

From 1850 until 1854 he served in various vessels on the West Coast of Africa and in 1851 he was present at the British attacks on Lagos, in the Bight of Biafra, then a stronghold of the slave trade carried on by the Portuguese. He served during the Crimean War and was in the Baltic Squadron at the Battle of Suomenlinna.

He was one of the crew sent to Australia in 1857 to recommission the surveying ship HMS Herald under Captain Henry Mangles Denham From 1857 to 1861, when the Herald returned to England, he worked on surveying voyages to King George Sound, Shark Bay, Great Barrier Reef and the Torres Strait. During this period Onslow was an active amateur photographer and produced photographs on his voyages and also during his stopovers in Sydney.

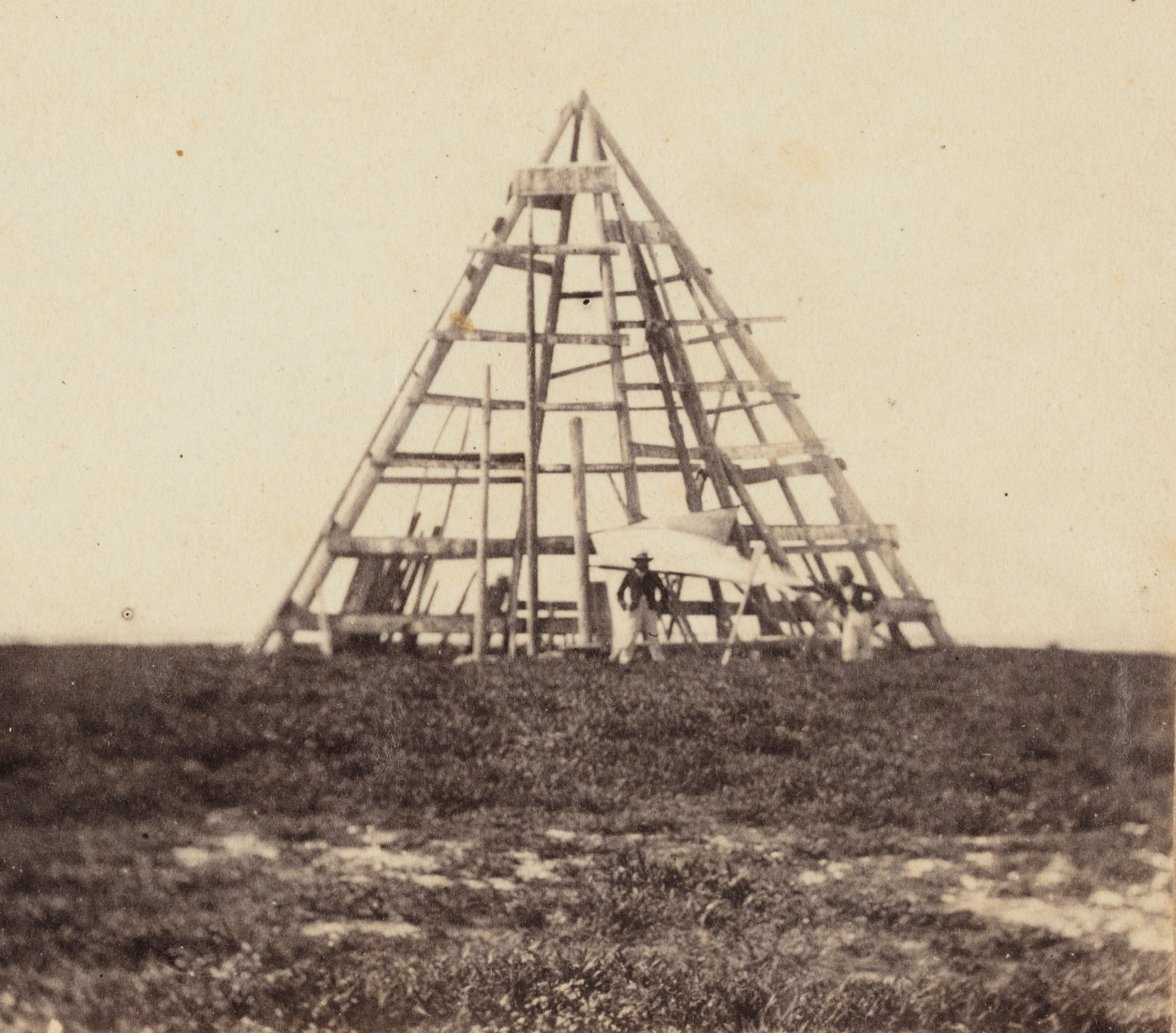
Beacon erected on Mellish Cay by H.M.S Herald from wreck of French War steamer Duroc, August 1859, Arthur Onslow

After returning to England he studied steam navigation at the Royal Naval College, before he joined the frigate HMS Phaeton, and was at Vera Cruz during the French operations at Mexico. In 1863 he was promoted to the rank of commander, and was appointed to HMS Meeanee (1848), 81 guns, then stationed in the Mediterranean. Soon after his health failed and he was compelled to seek leave of absence. Having obtained two years' sick leave he came to New South Wales, where he resided up to the time of his death.

On 31 January 1867 he married Elizabeth Macarthur, with whom he had eight children, including James Macarthur-Onslow and Sibella Macarthur-Onslow. In 1871 he retired with the rank of post captain. In 1869 he was elected to the New South Wales Legislative Assembly for Camden, serving until his elevation to the Legislative Council in 1880. He died in 1882.

New South Wales Legislative Assembly
Preceded by Richard Roberts	Member for Camden; 1869–1880; Served alongside: John Morrice/Thomas Garrett	Succeeded by John Kidd
