= Electoral district of Camden =

Camden New South Wales—Legislative Assembly
- Interactive map of district boundaries from the 2023 state election
- State: New South Wales
- Dates current: 1859–1920, 1981–current
- MP: Sally Quinnell
- Party: Labor
- Namesake: Camden, New South Wales
- Electors: 70,392 (2019)
- Area: 228 km^{2} (88.0 sq mi)
- Demographic: Outer-metropolitan
Electorates around Camden:
Wollondilly	Badgerys Creek	Leppington
Wollondilly	Camden	Campbelltown
Wollondilly	Wollondilly	Campbelltown

Camden is an electoral district of the Legislative Assembly in the Australian state of New South Wales in Sydney's south-west. It is currently represented by Sally Quinnell of the Labor party, who achieved a 13% swing in the 2023 election.

== Geography ==
On its current boundaries, Camden takes in the suburbs of Bickley Vale, Camden, Camden Park, Camden South, Catherine Field, Cawdor, Cobbitty, Currans Hill, Elderslie, Ellis Lane, Gledswood Hills, Grasmere, Gregory Hills, Harrington Park, Kirkham, Mount Annan, Narellan, Narellan Vale, Smeaton Grange, and Spring Farm.

== History ==
Camden was originally created in 1859, replacing part of West Camden and named after the town of Camden or Camden County, which includes Camden, the Southern Highlands and the Illawarra. It elected two members from 1859 to 1889 and three members from 1889 to 1894, when multi-member electorates were abolished. It was abolished in 1920, with the introduction of proportional representation and absorbed into Cumberland. It was recreated in 1981. In recent decades it has been a marginal seat, falling to both the Labor and Liberal parties on separate occasions. Except in 1984–91 and 1995–2003, Camden in its second incarnation, has been held by the government party.

Camden was evident as a bellwether seat at the 1991 election when the ALP lost the seat to the Liberal Party despite the former party making huge gains at that election which was close but not enough for them to win the election. If the ALP had retained Camden in 1991, the party would have been in a strong position to form a minority government when it then won The Entrance by-election in 1992.

== Members for Camden ==
First incarnation (1859–1889, 2 members)
Member	Party	Term	Member	Party	Term			
Henry Oxley	None	1859–1860	William Wild	None	1859–1860			
John Morrice	None	1860–1872	John Douglas	None	1860–1861			
John Morrice	None	1860–1872	David Bell	None	1861–1864			
John Morrice	None	1860–1872	Richard Roberts	None	1864–1869			
John Morrice	None	1860–1872	Arthur Onslow	None	1869–1880			
Thomas Garrett	None	1872–1887	Arthur Onslow	None	1869–1880			
Thomas Garrett	None	1872–1887	John Kidd	None	1880–1882			
Thomas Garrett	None	1872–1887	William McCourt	None	1882–1885			
Thomas Garrett	None	1872–1887	John Kidd	None	1885–1887			
Thomas Garrett	Free Trade	1887–1889	William McCourt	Free Trade	1887–1889			
1889–1894, 3 members
Member	Party	Term	Member	Party	Term	Member	Party	Term
Thomas Garrett	Free Trade	1889–1891	William McCourt	Free Trade	1889–1894	John Kidd	Protectionist	1889–1894
William Cullen	Free Trade	1891–1894	William McCourt	Free Trade	1889–1894	John Kidd	Protectionist	1889–1894
1894–1920, 1 member
Member	Party	Term						
John Kidd	Protectionist	1894–1895						
Charles Bull	Free Trade	1895–1898						
John Kidd	Protectionist	1898–1901						
John Kidd	Progressive	1901–1904						
Fred Downes	Liberal Reform	1904–1913						
John Hunt	Liberal Reform	1913–1917						
John Hunt	Nationalist	1917–1920						
Second incarnation (1981–present, 1 member)
Member	Party	Term						
Ralph Brading	Labor	1981–1984						
John Fahey	Liberal	1984–1988						
Peter Primrose	Labor	1988–1991						
Liz Kernohan	Liberal	1991–2003						
Geoff Corrigan	Labor	2003–2011						
Chris Patterson	Liberal	2011–2019						
Peter Sidgreaves	Liberal	2019–2023						
Sally Quinnell	Labor	2023–present						

== Election results ==
2023 New South Wales state election: Camden
Party	Candidate	Votes	%	±%
Labor	Sally Quinnell	21,945	40.6	+11.2
Liberal	Peter Sidgreaves	19,686	36.4	−5.7
One Nation	Garry Dollin	7,437	13.8	+0.4
Greens	Emily Rivera	3,136	5.8	+1.7
Sustainable Australia	Jessie Bijok	1,868	3.5	+2.2
Total formal votes		54,072	96.3	0.0
Informal votes		2,056	3.7	+0.0
Turnout		56,128	90.7	+3.8
Two-party-preferred result
Labor	Sally Quinnell	25,060	53.0	+10.3
Liberal	Peter Sidgreaves	22,222	47.0	−10.3
Labor gain from Liberal		Swing	+10.3	
