= The Wollondilly Press =

Former newspaper in New South Wales, Australia

The Wollondilly Press, previously published as The Bowral Free Press, was an English language newspaper published twice weekly, on Wednesday and Saturday, in Bowral, New South Wales, Australia.

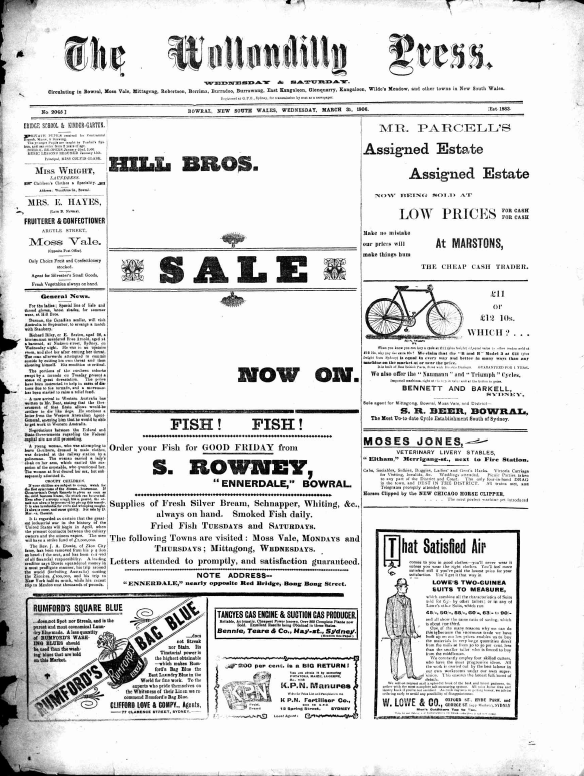
The front page of The Wollondilly Press on Wednesday 31 March 1906

== History ==
The newspaper was first published under this title on Wednesday 31 March 1906 by William Beer. The change of the title from The Bowral Free Press to The Wollondilly Press was intended to reflect the decision to extend the scope of the paper's operations "to take in the whole of the district". In the first issue under the new title the editor assured his Bowral readers that "the interests of Bowral residents will be guarded just as sacredly as of yore...".

The paper's predecessor, The Bowral Free Press, was first published by William Webb on 7 July 1883. He sold the paper the following year to William and Daniel Beer. Daniel Beer was the sole publisher of the Bowral Free Press from February 1885 until his death in 1891. Emily A. Beer was proprietor and editor from 1891 to 1895. In September 1895 the paper was sold to William Beer, who was the still the publisher when the paper changed its name to The Wollondilly Press.

== Digitisation ==
Many issues of the paper have been digitised as part of the Australian Newspapers Digitisation Program, a project of the National Library of Australia in cooperation with the State Library of New South Wales.

== See also ==
- List of newspapers in Australia
- List of newspapers in New South Wales
