= Charles Bull (politician) =

Australian politician

Charles William Bull (25 October 1846 – 15 May 1906) was an Australian politician and lawyer.

He was born at Liverpool to wheelwright William James Bull (1819-1900) and Catherine Ann Rowley (824-1901). A solicitor from 1873, he married Mary Susannah Morris (1848-1880) on 2 December 1871 at St Peter's Church of England, Campbelltown; they had four sons with one dying in infancy. His second marriage, also at St Peters Church of England, Campbelltown and held on 9 July 1881, was to Frances (Fanny) Australia Chippendall (1856-1921), with whom he had eleven children, two of whom died in infancy. He was admitted to the Bar in 1886 and practised law with his brother, Sidney John (1854-1938) the following year under the style Bull & Bull. He was appointed Queen's Counsel about 1890 with chambers at Barrister's Court, Elizabeth St, Sydney. In 1895 he was elected to the New South Wales Legislative Assembly as the Free Trade member for Camden, but he was defeated after a single term in 1898. Bull died at his late residence in Bexley in 1906 of a carbuncle on the neck.

New South Wales Legislative Assembly
Preceded by John Kidd	Member for Camden; 1895–1898	Succeeded by John Kidd
