= David Bell (Australian politician) =

Australian politician

David Bell (17 April 1828 – 23 November 1894) was an Australian politician.

He was born at Maitland to overseer Robert Bell. Little is known of him, but he was an unmarried pastoralist who probably held runs at Geogola and Spring Flat. In 1861 he was elected to the New South Wales Legislative Assembly for Camden, but he did not re-contest in 1864. Bell died in Dubbo in 1894.

New South Wales Legislative Assembly
Preceded by John Douglas	Member for Camden; 1861–1864; Served alongside: John Morrice	Succeeded by Richard Roberts
