= John Hunt (New South Wales politician) =

Australian politician

John Hunt MLA

Member of New South Wales Legislative Assembly
- In office 10 September 1907 – 6 November 1913
- Constituency: Electoral district of Sherbrooke
- In office 6 December 1913 – 18 February 1920
- Constituency: Electoral district of Camden

President of Hornsby Shire
- In office December 1906 – October 1907
- Preceded by: Inaugural
- Succeeded by: William Nixon
- Constituency: Hornsby Shire

Personal details
- Born: 27 June 1856 Dural, New South Wales
- Died: 23 March 1930 (aged 73) Parramatta, New South Wales
- Party: Liberal Reform Party; Nationalist Party of Australia
- Spouse: Annie Marie (née Golledge)
- Relations: Brother; The Hon. Alfred Hunt MLC
- Children: 3 daughters and 5 sons
- Education: Newington College
- Occupation: Orchardist & Grazier

John Charles Hunt (27 June 1856 – 23 March 1930) was an Australian politician and a member of the New South Wales Legislative Assembly for 13 years.

== Early life ==
Hunt was born in Dural, New South Wales, the son of George Thomas Hunt, orchardist, and Elizabeth Williams. He attended Parramatta North Public School and Newington College whilst the school was situated at Newington House on the Parramatta River.

== Career ==
Commissioned as a Justice of the Peace in 1892, Hunt was an orchardist and grazier. After school he joined his father as an orchardist in Dural and on his father's death he moved to Parramatta and became a member of Hunt Brothers Limited. He owned Burdenda Station on the Bogan River. In 1907, Hunt was the president of the Castle Hill Agricultural and Horticultural Association and vice president of Fruitgrowers' Union. He was a member of Carlingford-Dural Railway League in 1903 and was a Councillor of Hornsby Shire from 1906 until 1908 serving as President in his first two years.

At the 1907 election Hunt was elected to the Legislative Assembly as the Liberal member for Sherbrooke. When the district was abolished in 1913 he was elected as the member for Camden. He retired at the 1920 election and did not hold party, parliamentary or ministerial office.

Hunt died at Parramatta on 23 March 1930.

New South Wales Legislative Assembly
Preceded by Broughton O'Conor	Member for Sherbrooke; 1907–1913	District abolished
Preceded by Fred Downes	Member for Camden; 1913–1920	District abolished
