= William McCourt =

Australian politician

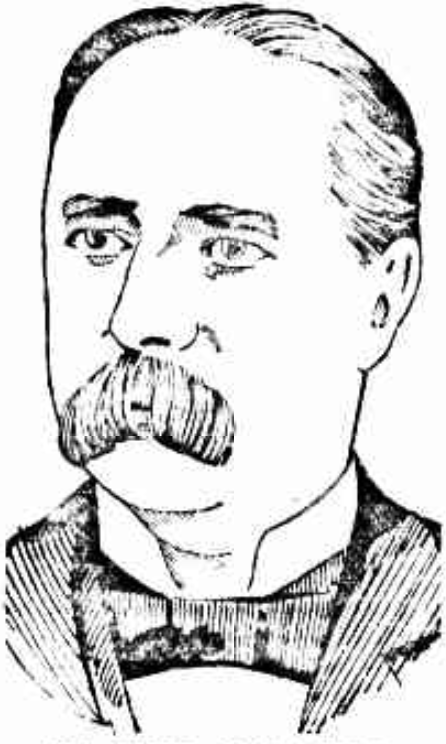
William McCourt (1851-1913) NSW politician

William Joseph McCourt (1 March 1851 – 22 June 1913) was an Irish-born Australian politician.

He was born in County Monaghan to shoemaker James McCourt and Bridget Smith. He arrived in New South Wales with his parents in 1852 and attended Wollongong Public School. He was apprenticed to a printer after leaving school, and was also a successful land speculator. In 1882 he married Emily Elizabeth, with whom he had six children.

He was elected to the New South Wales Legislative Assembly in 1882 as the member for Camden. He lost his seat in 1885 but was re-elected in 1887. A free trader, he transferred to Bowral in 1894 and to Wollondilly in 1904. By this time a member of the Liberal Reform Party, he was elected Speaker in 1900, serving until the election of a Labor government in 1910. McCourt held his seat until his death at Berrima in 1913.

New South Wales Legislative Assembly
Preceded by Thomas Garrett; John Kidd	Member for Camden; 1882–1885; Served alongside: Thomas Garrett	Succeeded by Thomas Garrett; John Kidd
Preceded by Thomas Garrett; John Kidd	Member for Camden; 1887–1894; Served alongside: Thomas Garrett, William Cullen	Succeeded by John Kidd
New district	Member for Bowral; 1894–1904	District abolished
New district	Member for Wollondilly; 1904–1913	Succeeded by Frank Badgery
Preceded by Sir Joseph Abbott	Speaker of the New South Wales Legislative Assembly; 1900–1910	Succeeded by John Cann
