= Electoral results for the district of Barwon =

Election results for Barwon, New South Wales, Australia

Barwon, an electoral district of the Legislative Assembly in the Australian state of New South Wales, was established in 1894. It was abolished in 1904 and re-established in 1927.

| Election | Member | Party |
|---|---|---|
| 1894 | William Willis | Protectionist |
| 1895 | William Willis | Protectionist |
| 1898 | William Willis | Protectionist |
| 1901 | William Willis | Progressive |
| Election | Member | Party |
| 1927 | Walter Wearne | Nationalist |
| 1930 | Bill Ratcliffe | Labor |
| 1932 | Ben Wade | Country |
| 1940 by | Roy Heferen | Labor |
| 1941 | Roy Heferen | Labor |
| 1944 | Roy Heferen | Labor |
| 1947 | Roy Heferen | Labor |
| 1950 | Geoff Crawford | Country |
| 1953 | Geoff Crawford | Country |
| 1956 | Geoff Crawford | Country |
| 1959 | Geoff Crawford | Country |
| 1962 | Geoff Crawford | Country |
| 1965 | Geoff Crawford | Country |
| 1968 | Geoff Crawford | Country |
| 1971 | Geoff Crawford | Country |
| 1973 | Geoff Crawford | Country |
| 1976 | Wal Murray | Country |
| 1978 | Wal Murray | National Country |
| 1981 | Wal Murray | National Country |
| 1984 | Wal Murray | National |
| 1988 | Wal Murray | National |
| 1991 | Wal Murray | National |
| 1995 | Ian Slack-Smith | National |
| 1999 | Ian Slack-Smith | National |
| 2003 | Ian Slack-Smith | National |
| 2007 | Kevin Humphries | National |
| 2011 | Kevin Humphries | National |
| 2015 | Kevin Humphries | National |
| 2019 | Roy Butler | Shooters, Fishers, Farmers |
| 2023 | Roy Butler | Independent |

== Election results ==
=== Elections in the 2020s ===
==== 2023 ====
2023 New South Wales state election: Barwon
| Party | Candidate | Votes | % | ±% |
|---|---|---|---|---|
| Independent | Roy Butler | 19,630 | 44.78 | +44.78 |
| National | Annette Turner | 11,158 | 25.45 | −4.93 |
| Labor | Joshua Roberts-Garnsey | 6,816 | 15.55 | −5.37 |
| Shooters, Fishers, Farmers | Paul Britton | 2,983 | 6.80 | −26.16 |
| Legalise Cannabis | Ben Hartley | 1,591 | 3.63 | +3.63 |
| Greens | Pat Schultz | 881 | 2.01 | −1.01 |
| Independent | Stuart Howe | 460 | 1.05 | +1.05 |
| Public Education | Thomas McBride | 318 | 0.73 | +0.73 |
| Total formal votes | | 43,837 | 96.94 | +0.49 |
| Informal votes | | 1,384 | 3.06 | −0.49 |
| Turnout | | 45,221 | 84.16 | −2.64 |
Notional two-party-preferred count
| National | Annette Turner | 15,971 | 60.76 | +8.24 |
| Labor | Joshua Roberts-Garnsey | 10,316 | 39.24 | −8.24 |
Two-candidate-preferred result
| Independent | Roy Butler | 23,868 | 65.99 | +65.99 |
| National | Annette Turner | 12,299 | 34.01 | −9.39 |
| Member changed to Independent from Shooters, Fishers, Farmers | | | | |

=== Elections in the 2010s ===
==== 2019 ====
2019 New South Wales state election: Barwon
| Party | Candidate | Votes | % | ±% |
|---|---|---|---|---|
| Shooters, Fishers, Farmers | Roy Butler | 15,218 | 32.96 | +32.96 |
| National | Andrew Schier | 14,027 | 30.38 | −18.72 |
| Labor | Darriea Turley | 9,661 | 20.92 | −3.08 |
| Independent | Phil Naden | 2,565 | 5.56 | +5.56 |
| Liberal Democrats | Andrew Fleisher | 1,571 | 3.40 | +3.40 |
| Greens | Leigh Williams | 1,395 | 3.02 | −3.15 |
| Independent | Owen Whyman | 735 | 1.59 | +1.59 |
| Animal Justice | Jason Alan | 558 | 1.21 | +1.21 |
| Sustainable Australia | Maree McDonald-Pritchard | 444 | 0.96 | +0.96 |
| Total formal votes | | 46,174 | 96.45 | −0.17 |
| Informal votes | | 1,701 | 3.55 | +0.17 |
| Turnout | | 47,875 | 86.80 | −0.82 |
Two-party-preferred result
| National | Andrew Schier | 16,483 | 52.52 | −10.37 |
| Labor | Darriea Turley | 14,904 | 47.48 | +10.37 |
Two-candidate-preferred result
| Shooters, Fishers, Farmers | Roy Butler | 19,901 | 56.60 | +56.60 |
| National | Andrew Schier | 15,258 | 43.40 | −19.48 |
| Shooters, Fishers, Farmers gain from National | | | | |

==== 2015 ====
2015 New South Wales state election: Barwon
| Party | Candidate | Votes | % | ±% |
|---|---|---|---|---|
| National | Kevin Humphries | 23,426 | 49.1 | −22.9 |
| Labor | Craig Ashby | 11,454 | 24.0 | +2.5 |
| Independent | Rohan Boehm | 8,051 | 16.9 | +16.9 |
| Greens | Cameron Jones | 2,942 | 6.2 | +0.3 |
| Christian Democrats | Ian Hutchinson | 1,192 | 2.5 | +2.5 |
| No Land Tax | Nella Lopreiato | 646 | 1.4 | +1.4 |
| Total formal votes | | 47,711 | 96.6 | −0.6 |
| Informal votes | | 1,670 | 3.4 | +0.6 |
| Turnout | | 49,381 | 87.6 | +1.1 |
Two-party-preferred result
| National | Kevin Humphries | 25,524 | 62.9 | −13.1 |
| Labor | Craig Ashby | 15,065 | 37.1 | +13.1 |
| National hold | | Swing | −13.1 | |

==== 2011 ====
2011 New South Wales state election: Barwon
| Party | Candidate | Votes | % | ±% |
|---|---|---|---|---|
| National | Kevin Humphries | 30,949 | 79.1 | +34.8 |
| Labor | Patrick Massarani | 6,276 | 16.0 | −3.4 |
| Greens | Ian George | 1,882 | 4.8 | +1.8 |
| Total formal votes | | 39,107 | 97.8 | 0.0 |
| Informal votes | | 876 | 2.2 | 0.0 |
| Turnout | | 39,983 | 91.3 | +0.2 |
Two-party-preferred result
| National | Kevin Humphries | 31,349 | 82.0 | +26.0 |
| Labor | Patrick Massarani | 6,883 | 18.0 | +18.0 |
| National hold | | Swing | +26.0 | |

=== Elections in the 2000s ===
==== 2007 ====
2007 New South Wales state election: Barwon
| Party | Candidate | Votes | % | ±% |
|---|---|---|---|---|
| National | Kevin Humphries | 17,591 | 44.3 | −8.1 |
| Independent | Tim Horan | 11,607 | 29.2 | +29.2 |
| Labor | Meryl Dillon | 7,732 | 19.5 | −9.0 |
| Greens | Darren Bodell | 1,180 | 3.0 | +0.5 |
| Christian Democrats | Heath Wilson | 906 | 2.3 | +2.3 |
| Independent | Les Paul | 696 | 1.8 | +1.8 |
| Total formal votes | | 39,712 | 97.8 | 0.0 |
| Informal votes | | 877 | 2.2 | 0.0 |
| Turnout | | 40,589 | 91.1 | |
Notional two-party-preferred count
| National | Kevin Humphries | 20,932 | 68.9 | +4.6 |
| Labor | Meryl Dillon | 9,450 | 31.1 | −4.6 |
Two-candidate-preferred result
| National | Kevin Humphries | 19,021 | 56.0 | −8.3 |
| Independent | Tim Horan | 14,950 | 44.0 | +44.0 |
| National hold | | Swing | −8.3 | |

==== 2003 ====
2003 New South Wales state election: Barwon
| Party | Candidate | Votes | % | ±% |
|---|---|---|---|---|
| National | Ian Slack-Smith | 19,069 | 50.7 | −0.5 |
| Labor | Meryl Dillon | 9,502 | 25.3 | +0.8 |
| Independent | Jack Warnock | 6,619 | 17.6 | +17.6 |
| One Nation | Chris Spence | 1,127 | 3.0 | −17.5 |
| Greens | David Paull | 784 | 2.1 | +2.1 |
| Independent | Richard Stringer | 502 | 1.3 | +1.3 |
| Total formal votes | | 37,603 | 98.1 | −0.2 |
| Informal votes | | 729 | 1.9 | +0.2 |
| Turnout | | 38,332 | 90.6 | |
Two-party-preferred result
| National | Ian Slack-Smith | 21,701 | 66.2 | −1.0 |
| Labor | Meryl Dillon | 11,102 | 33.8 | +1.0 |
| National hold | | Swing | −1.0 | |

=== Elections in the 1990s ===
==== 1999 ====
1999 New South Wales state election: Barwon
| Party | Candidate | Votes | % | ±% |
|---|---|---|---|---|
| National | Ian Slack-Smith | 19,994 | 51.2 | −6.1 |
| Labor | Meryl Dillon | 9,554 | 24.5 | −3.7 |
| One Nation | Bob Johns | 7,988 | 20.5 | +20.5 |
| Democrats | Ken Graham | 1,085 | 2.8 | +2.0 |
| Citizens Electoral Council | Albert Cooke | 415 | 1.1 | +1.1 |
| Total formal votes | | 39,036 | 98.3 | +3.4 |
| Informal votes | | 669 | 1.7 | −3.4 |
| Turnout | | 39,705 | 92.0 | |
Two-party-preferred result
| National | Ian Slack-Smith | 22,224 | 67.2 | −1.3 |
| Labor | Meryl Dillon | 10,865 | 32.8 | +1.3 |
| National hold | | Swing | −1.3 | |

==== 1995 ====
1995 New South Wales state election: Barwon
| Party | Candidate | Votes | % | ±% |
|---|---|---|---|---|
| National | Ian Slack-Smith | 20,026 | 60.2 | +9.3 |
| Labor | Ted Stubbins | 8,444 | 25.4 | +0.5 |
| Independent | Bevan O'Regan | 2,468 | 7.4 | −7.0 |
| Environment Inds | Pat Jackson | 1,258 | 3.8 | +3.8 |
| Independent | Jim Perrett | 549 | 1.7 | +1.7 |
| Democrats | Gregory Cutlack | 520 | 1.6 | −8.3 |
| Total formal votes | | 33,265 | 95.7 | +2.4 |
| Informal votes | | 1,488 | 4.3 | −2.4 |
| Turnout | | 34,753 | 93.3 | |
Two-party-preferred result
| National | Ian Slack-Smith | 22,158 | 70.1 | +5.1 |
| Labor | Ted Stubbins | 9,429 | 29.9 | −5.1 |
| National hold | | Swing | +5.1 | |

==== 1991 ====
1991 New South Wales state election: Barwon
| Party | Candidate | Votes | % | ±% |
|---|---|---|---|---|
| National | Wal Murray | 16,682 | 50.9 | −19.6 |
| Labor | Steve Funnell | 8,154 | 24.9 | +0.5 |
| Country Residents | Bevan O'Regan | 4,718 | 14.4 | +14.4 |
| Democrats | Jenni Birch | 3,236 | 9.9 | +8.4 |
| Total formal votes | | 32,790 | 93.3 | −4.5 |
| Informal votes | | 2,361 | 6.7 | +4.5 |
| Turnout | | 35,151 | 93.0 | |
Two-party-preferred result
| National | Wal Murray | 19,869 | 65.1 | −8.9 |
| Labor | Steve Funnell | 10,659 | 34.9 | +8.9 |
| National hold | | Swing | −8.9 | |

=== Elections in the 1980s ===
==== 1988 ====
1988 New South Wales state election: Barwon
| Party | Candidate | Votes | % | ±% |
|---|---|---|---|---|
| National | Wal Murray | 20,314 | 68.4 | +10.2 |
| Labor | Edward Stubbins | 6,819 | 22.9 | −11.9 |
| Independent | Ross Provis | 2,581 | 8.7 | +8.7 |
| Total formal votes | | 29,714 | 98.3 | −0.7 |
| Informal votes | | 529 | 1.7 | +0.7 |
| Turnout | | 30,243 | 93.5 | |
Two-party-preferred result
| National | Wal Murray | 21,785 | 74.3 | +12.5 |
| Labor | Edward Stubbins | 7,543 | 25.7 | −12.5 |
| National hold | | Swing | +12.5 | |

==== 1984 ====
1984 New South Wales state election: Barwon
| Party | Candidate | Votes | % | ±% |
|---|---|---|---|---|
| National | Wal Murray | 18,503 | 58.5 | −4.7 |
| Labor | Bill Sinclair | 10,368 | 32.8 | −4.0 |
| Independent | Andrew Von Mengersen | 2,729 | 8.6 | +8.6 |
| Total formal votes | | 31,600 | 98.8 | +0.7 |
| Informal votes | | 389 | 1.2 | −0.7 |
| Turnout | | 31,989 | 91.7 | +1.2 |
Two-party-preferred result
| National | Wal Murray | | 63.0 | −0.2 |
| Labor | Bill Sinclair | | 37.0 | +0.2 |
| National hold | | Swing | −0.2 | |

==== 1981 ====
1981 New South Wales state election: Barwon
| Party | Candidate | Votes | % | ±% |
|---|---|---|---|---|
| National Country | Wal Murray | 19,571 | 63.2 | +4.9 |
| Labor | Richard Emerson | 11,389 | 36.8 | −4.9 |
| Total formal votes | | 30,960 | 98.1 | |
| Informal votes | | 595 | 1.9 | |
| Turnout | | 31,555 | 90.5 | |
| National Country hold | | Swing | +4.9 | |

=== Elections in the 1970s ===
==== 1978 ====
1978 New South Wales state election: Barwon
| Party | Candidate | Votes | % | ±% |
|---|---|---|---|---|
| National Country | Wal Murray | 12,223 | 58.3 | −0.2 |
| Labor | Marshall Duncan | 8,754 | 41.7 | +0.2 |
| Total formal votes | | 20,977 | 98.1 | −0.5 |
| Informal votes | | 404 | 1.9 | +0.5 |
| Turnout | | 21,381 | 93.1 | −0.5 |
| National Country hold | | Swing | −0.2 | |

==== 1976 ====
1976 New South Wales state election: Barwon
| Party | Candidate | Votes | % | ±% |
|---|---|---|---|---|
| Country | Wal Murray | 11,999 | 58.5 | −17.0 |
| Labor | Marshall Duncan | 8,504 | 41.5 | +41.5 |
| Total formal votes | | 20,503 | 98.6 | −2.4 |
| Informal votes | | 294 | 1.4 | +2.4 |
| Turnout | | 20,797 | 93.6 | +1.9 |
| Country hold | | Swing | −17.0 | |

==== 1973 ====
1973 New South Wales state election: Barwon
| Party | Candidate | Votes | % | ±% |
|---|---|---|---|---|
| Country | Geoff Crawford | 14,020 | 75.5 | +24.8 |
| Australia | Graham Gifford | 4,540 | 24.5 | +24.5 |
| Total formal votes | | 18,560 | 96.2 | |
| Informal votes | | 725 | 3.8 | |
| Turnout | | 19,285 | 91.7 | |
| Country hold | | Swing | +18.8 | |

==== 1971 ====
1971 New South Wales state election: Barwon
| Party | Candidate | Votes | % | ±% |
|---|---|---|---|---|
| Country | Geoff Crawford | 8,464 | 50.7 | −2.5 |
| Labor | Peter Prentice | 6,467 | 38.8 | +6.6 |
| Independent | David Aiken | 979 | 5.9 | +5.9 |
| Australia | Thomas Broadbent | 475 | 2.9 | +2.9 |
| Independent | Wallace Ridley | 306 | 1.8 | +1.8 |
| Total formal votes | | 16,691 | 98.0 | |
| Informal votes | | 339 | 2.0 | |
| Turnout | | 17,030 | 88.0 | |
Two-party-preferred result
| Country | Geoff Crawford | 9,469 | 56.7 | −6.6 |
| Labor | Peter Prentice | 7,222 | 43.3 | +6.6 |
| Country hold | | Swing | −6.6 | |

=== Elections in the 1960s ===
==== 1968 ====
1968 New South Wales state election: Barwon
| Party | Candidate | Votes | % | ±% |
|---|---|---|---|---|
| Country | Geoff Crawford | 10,668 | 53.2 | −6.6 |
| Labor | Cecil Newton | 6,450 | 32.2 | −8.6 |
| New Staters | David Aiken | 2,935 | 14.6 | +14.6 |
| Total formal votes | | 20,053 | 98.0 | |
| Informal votes | | 414 | 2.0 | |
| Turnout | | 20,467 | 94.4 | |
Two-party-preferred result
| Country | Geoff Crawford | 12,690 | 63.3 | +3.5 |
| Labor | Cecil Newton | 7,363 | 36.7 | −3.5 |
| Country hold | | Swing | +3.5 | |

==== 1965 ====
1965 New South Wales state election: Barwon
| Party | Candidate | Votes | % | ±% |
|---|---|---|---|---|
| Country | Geoff Crawford | 12,084 | 60.9 | +4.3 |
| Labor | Cecil Newton | 7,749 | 39.1 | −4.3 |
| Total formal votes | | 19,833 | 98.7 | −0.5 |
| Informal votes | | 261 | 1.3 | +0.5 |
| Turnout | | 20,094 | 94.2 | +0.2 |
| Country hold | | Swing | +4.3 | |

==== 1962 ====
1962 New South Wales state election: Barwon
| Party | Candidate | Votes | % | ±% |
|---|---|---|---|---|
| Country | Geoff Crawford | 10,589 | 56.6 | −1.0 |
| Labor | Cecil Newton | 8,117 | 43.4 | +1.0 |
| Total formal votes | | 18,706 | 99.2 | |
| Informal votes | | 146 | 0.8 | |
| Turnout | | 18,852 | 94.0 | |
| Country hold | | Swing | −1.0 | |

=== Elections in the 1950s ===
==== 1959 ====
1959 New South Wales state election: Barwon
| Party | Candidate | Votes | % | ±% |
|---|---|---|---|---|
| Country | Geoff Crawford | 9,789 | 60.7 | |
| Labor | Thomas Burt | 6,338 | 39.3 | |
| Total formal votes | | 16,127 | 99.0 | |
| Informal votes | | 168 | 1.0 | |
| Turnout | | 16,295 | 92.3 | |
| Country hold | | Swing | | |

==== 1956 ====
1956 New South Wales state election: Barwon
| Party | Candidate | Votes | % | ±% |
|---|---|---|---|---|
| Country | Geoff Crawford | 8,733 | 59.0 | +5.2 |
| Labor | Gerard McInerney | 6,061 | 41.0 | −5.2 |
| Total formal votes | | 14,794 | 99.1 | +0.6 |
| Informal votes | | 140 | 0.9 | −0.6 |
| Turnout | | 14,934 | 85.7 | −7.3 |
| Country hold | | Swing | +5.2 | |

==== 1953 ====
1953 New South Wales state election: Barwon
| Party | Candidate | Votes | % | ±% |
|---|---|---|---|---|
| Country | Geoff Crawford | 8,274 | 53.8 | |
| Labor | Gerard McInerney | 7,118 | 46.2 | |
| Total formal votes | | 15,392 | 98.5 | |
| Informal votes | | 234 | 1.5 | |
| Turnout | | 15,626 | 93.0 | |
| Country hold | | Swing | | |

==== 1950 ====
1950 New South Wales state election: Barwon
| Party | Candidate | Votes | % | ±% |
|---|---|---|---|---|
| Country | Geoff Crawford | 6,113 | 45.1 | |
| Labor | Norman Ferguson | 4,863 | 35.9 | |
| Independent Labor | Roy Heferen | 1,593 | 11.8 | |
| Liberal | William McKechnie | 988 | 7.3 | |
| Total formal votes | | 13,557 | 97.9 | |
| Informal votes | | 290 | 2.1 | |
| Turnout | | 13,847 | 85.7 | |
Two-party-preferred result
| Country | Geoff Crawford | | 53.60 (Note: Two party preferred vote was estimated.) | |
| Labor | Norman Ferguson | | 46.4 | |
| Country gain from Labor | | Swing | | |

The sitting member was Roy Heferen who had been elected as a Labor candidate, however he was disendorsed as a result of voting in the election for the Legislative Council and stood as an Independent labor candidate.

=== Elections in the 1940s ===
==== 1947 ====
1947 New South Wales state election: Barwon
| Party | Candidate | Votes | % | ±% |
|---|---|---|---|---|
| Labor | Roy Heferen | 6,952 | 49.5 | −6.1 |
| Country | Geoff Crawford | 5,688 | 40.5 | +40.5 |
| Country | Ernest Ellis | 1,402 | 10.0 | +10.0 |
| Total formal votes | | 14,042 | 99.3 | +1.3 |
| Informal votes | | 100 | 0.7 | −1.3 |
| Turnout | | 14,142 | 93.1 | +4.7 |
Two-party-preferred result
| Labor | Roy Heferen | 7,042 | 50.2 | −5.4 |
| Country | Geoff Crawford | 7,000 | 49.8 | +49.8 |
| Labor hold | | Swing | N/A | |

==== 1944 ====
1944 New South Wales state election: Barwon
| Party | Candidate | Votes | % | ±% |
|---|---|---|---|---|
| Labor | Roy Heferen | 7,136 | 55.6 | −2.2 |
| Independent | Ben Wade | 5,703 | 44.4 | +44.4 |
| Total formal votes | | 12,839 | 98.0 | −0.9 |
| Informal votes | | 268 | 2.0 | +0.9 |
| Turnout | | 13,107 | 88.4 | −4.0 |
| Labor hold | | Swing | N/A | |

==== 1941 ====
1941 New South Wales state election: Barwon
| Party | Candidate | Votes | % | ±% |
|---|---|---|---|---|
| Labor | Roy Heferen | 8,192 | 57.8 | |
| Country | Favel Satterthwaite | 5,983 | 42.2 | |
| Total formal votes | | 14,175 | 98.9 | |
| Informal votes | | 150 | 1.1 | |
| Turnout | | 14,325 | 92.4 | |
| Labor gain from Country | | Swing | | |

==== 1940 by-election ====
1940 Barwon by-election Saturday 16 November
| Party | Candidate | Votes | % | ±% |
|---|---|---|---|---|
| Labor | Roy Heferen | 6,246 | 46.8 | |
| Country | Favel Satterthwaite | 3,372 | 25.3 | |
| Country | Harold Johnston | 1,779 | 13.3 | |
| Labor (N-C) | William McArdle | 1,024 | 7.7 | |
| Country | Loenard Conway | 926 | 9.9 | |
| Total formal votes | | 13,347 | 97.1 | 1.5 |
| Informal votes | | 399 | 2.9 | +1.5 |
| Turnout | | 13,746 | 84.5 | −10.8 |
After distribution of preferences
| Labor | Roy Heferen | 7,325 | 54.9 | |
| Country | Favel Satterthwaite | 3,762 | 28.2 | |
| Country | Harold Johnston | 2,260 | 16.9 | |
| Labor gain from Country | | Swing | N/A | |

Ben Wade (Country) resigned to unsuccessfully contest the 1940 election for Gwydir. Preferences were not distributed to completion.

=== Elections in the 1930s ===
==== 1938 ====
1938 New South Wales state election: Barwon
| Party | Candidate | Votes | % | ±% |
|---|---|---|---|---|
| Country | Ben Wade | 8,016 | 55.4 | −2.5 |
| Labor | Thomas Kane | 6,452 | 44.6 | +2.5 |
| Total formal votes | | 14,468 | 98.8 | +1.7 |
| Informal votes | | 174 | 1.2 | −1.7 |
| Turnout | | 14,642 | 95.1 | +1.9 |
| Country hold | | Swing | −2.5 | |

==== 1935 ====
1935 New South Wales state election: Barwon
| Party | Candidate | Votes | % | ±% |
|---|---|---|---|---|
| Country | Benjamin Wade | 8,148 | 57.9 | +4.7 |
| Labor (NSW) | John O'Connor | 5,934 | 42.1 | +5.3 |
| Total formal votes | | 14,082 | 97.1 | −1.5 |
| Informal votes | | 416 | 2.9 | +1.5 |
| Turnout | | 14,498 | 93.2 | −2.1 |
| Country hold | | Swing | N/A | |

==== 1932 ====
1932 New South Wales state election: Barwon
| Party | Candidate | Votes | % | ±% |
|---|---|---|---|---|
| Country | Ben Wade | 7,442 | 53.2 | +14.4 |
| Labor (NSW) | Edward Cummins | 5,149 | 36.8 | −13.1 |
| Federal Labor | Lou Cunningham | 1,395 | 10.0 | +10.0 |
| Total formal votes | | 13,986 | 98.6 | +0.9 |
| Informal votes | | 201 | 1.4 | −0.9 |
| Turnout | | 14,187 | 95.3 | +0.2 |
| Country gain from Labor (NSW) | | Swing | N/A | |

- Preferences were not distributed.

==== 1930 ====
1930 New South Wales state election: Barwon
| Party | Candidate | Votes | % | ±% |
|---|---|---|---|---|
| Labor | Bill Ratcliffe | 6,719 | 49.9 | |
| Country | Ben Wade | 5,232 | 38.8 | |
| Nationalist | George McDonald | 1,359 | 10.1 | |
| Communist | Colin Smith | 156 | 1.2 | |
| Total formal votes | | 13,466 | 97.7 | |
| Informal votes | | 319 | 2.3 | |
| Turnout | | 13,785 | 95.1 | |
Two-party-preferred result
| Labor | Bill Ratcliffe | 6,984 | 51.9 | |
| Country | Ben Wade | 6,482 | 48.1 | |
| Labor gain from Nationalist | | Swing | | |

=== Elections in the 1920s ===
==== 1927 ====
1927 New South Wales state election: Barwon
| Party | Candidate | Votes | % | ±% |
|---|---|---|---|---|
| Nationalist | Walter Wearne | 6,098 | 52.7 | |
| Labor | George Brand | 4,742 | 41.0 | |
| Independent | George Taylor | 739 | 6.4 | |
| Total formal votes | | 11,579 | 98.5 | |
| Informal votes | | 178 | 1.5 | |
| Turnout | | 11,757 | 84.0 | |
| Nationalist win | | (new seat) | | |

==== 1904 - 1927 ====
District abolished

=== Elections in the 1900s ===
==== 1901 ====
1901 New South Wales state election: The Barwon
| Party | Candidate | Votes | % | ±% |
|---|---|---|---|---|
| Progressive | William Willis | 817 | 65.9 | +8.0 |
| Labour | William Wright | 422 | 34.1 | −8.0 |
| Total formal votes | | 1,239 | 99.0 | +0.3 |
| Informal votes | | 13 | 1.0 | −0.3 |
| Turnout | | 1,252 | 56.3 | +0.9 |
| Progressive hold | | | | |

=== Elections in the 1890s ===
==== 1898 ====
1898 New South Wales colonial election: The Barwon
| Party | Candidate | Votes | % | ±% |
|---|---|---|---|---|
| National Federal | William Willis | 905 | 57.9 | |
| Labour | Donald Macdonell | 659 | 42.1 | |
| Total formal votes | | 1,564 | 98.7 | |
| Informal votes | | 20 | 1.3 | |
| Turnout | | 1,584 | 55.4 | |
| National Federal hold | | | | |

==== 1895 ====
1895 New South Wales colonial election: The Barwon
| Party | Candidate | Votes | % | ±% |
|---|---|---|---|---|
| Protectionist | William Willis | 564 | 54.6 | |
| Labour | Donald Macdonell | 469 | 45.4 | |
| Total formal votes | | 1,033 | 98.1 | |
| Informal votes | | 20 | 1.9 | |
| Turnout | | 1,053 | 58.6 | |
| Protectionist hold | | | | |

==== 1894 ====
1894 New South Wales colonial election: The Barwon
| Party | Candidate | Votes | % | ±% |
|---|---|---|---|---|
| Protectionist | William Willis | 507 | 40.4 | |
| Independent Labour | Donald Macdonell | 505 | 40.3 | |
| Free Trade | Richard Machattie | 104 | 8.3 | |
| Ind. Free Trade | Langloh Parker | 93 | 7.4 | |
| Labour | Samuel Rosa | 43 | 3.4 | |
| Ind. Protectionist | Pratrick Griffin | 2 | 0.2 | |
| Total formal votes | | 1,254 | 98.0 | |
| Informal votes | | 26 | 2.0 | |
| Turnout | | 1,280 | 78.3 | |
| Protectionist win | | (new seat) | | |

The Barwon consisted of part of Bourke and parts of the abolished districts of The Bogan and The Namoi. William Willis (Protectionist) was one of the members for Bourke.
