= Members of the New South Wales Legislative Council, 2003–2007 =

Members of the New South Wales Legislative Council, 2003–2007

Members of the New South Wales Legislative Council who served in the 54th Parliament were elected at the 2003 and 2007 elections. As members serve eight-year terms, half of the Council was elected in 2003 and did not face re-election in 2007, and the members elected in 2007 did not face re-election until 2011. The President was Meredith Burgmann.

Name	Party	End term	Years in office
Peter Breen (Note: Peter Breen was elected on the ticket of the Reform the Legal System microparty, which subsequently morphed into the Human Rights Party. He defected to the Labor Party on 6 May 2006, but was forced to resign from the party on 18 July after making controversial comments about a convicted murderer. Breen subsequently returned to the Human Rights Party.)	Legal System Reform/Labor/Human Rights	2007	1999–2007
Robert Brown (Note: Shooters Party MLC John Tingle resigned on 2 May 2006 due to health issues. Robert Brown was appointed to the vacancy on 3 May.)	Shooters	2011	2006–2019
Meredith Burgmann	Labor	2007	1991–2007
Tony Burke (Note: Labor MLC Tony Burke resigned on 24 June 2004 to contest the House of Representatives seat of Watson at the 2004 federal election. Eric Roozendaal was appointed to the vacancy on 28 June.)	Labor	2007	2003–2004
Jan Burnswoods	Labor	2007	1991–2007
Tony Catanzariti	Labor	2011	2003–2011
Arthur Chesterfield-Evans	Democrats	2007	1998–2007
David Clarke	Liberal	2011	2003–2019
Ian Cohen	Greens	2011	1995–2011
Rick Colless	National	2011	2000–2019
Michael Costa	Labor	2011	2001–2008
Catherine Cusack	Liberal	2011	2003–2022
John Della Bosca	Labor	2007	1999–2010
Greg Donnelly (Note: Labor MLC Michael Egan resigned in January 2005. Greg Donnelly was appointed to the vacancy on 23 February.)	Labor	2011	2005–present
Michael Egan	Labor	2011	1986–2005
Amanda Fazio	Labor	2011	2000–2015
Patricia Forsythe (Note: Liberal MLC Patricia Forsythe resigned on 13 September 2006 after losing Liberal preselection to recontest her seat at the 2007 election. Matthew Mason-Cox, who had defeated her for preselection, was appointed to the vacancy on 28 September.)	Liberal	2007	1991–2006
Mike Gallacher	Liberal	2007	1996–2017
Jenny Gardiner	National	2011	1991–2015
Duncan Gay	National	2007	1988–2017
Kayee Griffin	Labor	2007	2003–2011
Sylvia Hale	Greens	2011	2003–2010
Don Harwin	Liberal	2007	1999–2022
John Hatzistergos	Labor	2007	1999–2011
Jon Jenkins (Note: Outdoor Recreation Party MLC Malcolm Jones resigned on 23 September 2003, pre-empting an expulsion motion as a result of criminal charges he was facing for misusing his parliamentary entitlements. Jon Jenkins was appointed to the vacancy on 29 October.) (Note: Outdoor Recreation Party MLC Jon Jenkins resigned on 16 February 2007. The party did not nominate a replacement due to the close proximity of the 2007 state election.)	Outdoor Recreation	2007	2003–2007
Malcolm Jones	Outdoor Recreation	2007	1999–2003
Tony Kelly	Labor	2011	1987–1988, 1997–2011
Charlie Lynn	Liberal	2007	1995–2015
Ian Macdonald	Labor	2007	1988–2010
Matthew Mason-Cox	Liberal	2007	2006–2023
Gordon Moyes	Christian Democrats	2011	2002–2011
Fred Nile (Note: Christian Democratic Party MLC Fred Nile resigned on 30 August 2004 to contest a seat in the Australian Senate at the 2004 federal election. The party initially nominated Ross Clifford as his replacement, but later decided to renominate Nile to his own vacancy on 21 October after he failed in his Senate bid.)	Christian Democrats	2007	1981–2004, 2004–present
Eddie Obeid	Labor	2007	1991–2011
David Oldfield (Note: David Oldfield resigned from One Nation NSW, a splinter party he had founded during the previous term after his expulsion from One Nation, on 28 December 2004, and served out the remainder of his term as an independent.)	One Nation NSW / Independent	2007	1999–2007
Robyn Parker	Liberal	2011	2003–2011
Melinda Pavey	National	2007	2002–2015
Greg Pearce	Liberal	2011	2000–2017
Peter Primrose	Labor	2011	1996–present
Lee Rhiannon	Greens	2007	1999–2010
Christine Robertson	Labor	2011	2003–2011
Eric Roozendaal	Labor	2011	2004–2013
John Ryan	Liberal	2007	1991–2007
Penny Sharpe (Note: Labor MLC Carmel Tebbutt resigned on 26 August 2005 in order to contest a by-election in the Legislative Assembly seat of Marrickville. Penny Sharpe was appointed to the vacancy on 30 September.)	Labor	2011	2005–2015, 2015–present
Carmel Tebbutt	Labor	2011	1998–2005
John Tingle	Shooters	2011	1995–2006
Henry Tsang	Labor	2007	1999–2009
Ian West	Labor	2011	2000–2011
Peter Wong	Unity	2007	1999–2007
