= Results of the 2003 New South Wales state election (Legislative Council) =

Legislative Council election for New South Wales, Australia in March 2003

2003 New South Wales state election (Legislative Council)
← 1999	22 March 2003	2007 →

21 of the 42 seats in the Legislative Council 21 seats needed for a majority

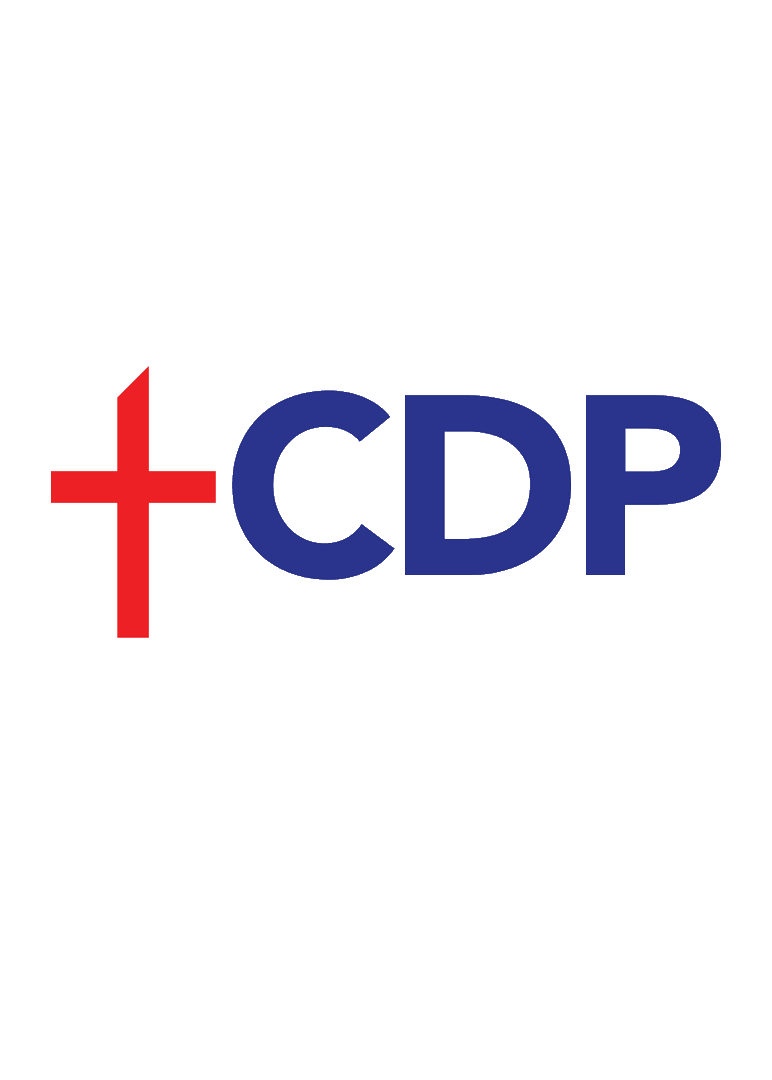
	First party	Second party	Third party
		L/NP
Leader	Michael Egan	Mike Gallacher	None
Party	Labor	Coalition	Greens
Seats before	16	14	2
Seats won	10	7	2
Seats after	18	13	3
Seat change	▲2	▼1	▲1
Popular vote	1,620,190	1,239,107	320,010
Percentage	43.54%	33.30%	8.60%
Swing	▲6.27pp	▲5.91pp	▲5.69pp
	Fourth party	Fifth party	Sixth party
		SFF	DEM
Leader	Fred Nile	Roy Smith	Arthur Chesterfield-Evans
Party	Christian Democrats	SFF	Democrats
Seats before	2	1	1
Seats won	1	1	0
Seats after	2	1	1
Seat change	Steady	Steady	Steady
Popular vote	112,865	76,133	58,494
Percentage	3.03%	2.05%	1.57%
Swing	▼0.14pp	▲0.38pp	▼2.44pp
	Seventh party	Eighth party	Ninth party
	ONP	UNI	RLS
Leader	David Oldfield	Peter Wong	Peter Breen
Party	One Nation	Unity	RLS
Seats before	1	1	1
Seats won	0	0	0
Seats after	1	1	1
Seat change	Steady	Steady	Steady
Popular vote	55,396	52,979	9,644
Percentage	1.49%	1.42%	0.26%
Swing	▼4.85pp	▲0.44pp	▼0.74pp

This is a list of results for the Legislative Council at the 2003 New South Wales state election.

== Results ==
2003 New South Wales state election: Legislative Council
Party	Candidate	Votes	%	±%
Quota		169,158		
Labor	1. Michael Egan (elected 1); 2. Carmel Tebbutt (elected 4); 3. Michael Costa (elected 6); 4. Ian West (elected 8); 5. Tony Kelly (elected 10); 6. Peter Primrose (elected 12); 7. Tony Burke (elected 14); 8. Christine Robertson (elected 16); 9. Kayee Griffin (elected 17); 10. Tony Catanzariti (elected 20); 11. Alison Peters; 12. Warren Mundine; 13. Pierre Esber; 14. Sophie Cotsis; 15. Lois Boswell; 16. Linda Kirgan; 17. Gerald Ng; 18. Carly Learson	1,620,190	43.54	+6.27
Liberal/National Coalition	1. Mike Gallacher (elected 2); 2. Duncan Gay (elected 5); 3. Greg Pearce (elected 7); 4. David Clarke (elected 9); 5. Rick Colless (elected 11); 6. Catherine Cusack (elected 13); 7. Robyn Parker (elected 15); 8. Gerald Anderson; 9. Robert Hansen; 10. Rachel Creek; 11. Avis Kennedy; 12. David Poole; 13. Terence Tang; 14. Michael Darby; 15. Jeff Herdegen; 16. Coral Slattery; 17. Elizabeth Hill; 18. Deal Gillespie; 19. Nick De Stefani	1,239,107	33.30	+5.91
Greens	1. Ian Cohen (elected 3); 2. Sylvia Hale (elected 18); 3. Carol Berry; 4. Jan Davis; 5. John Kaye; 6. Emelia Holdaway; 7. Mithra Cox; 8. Jeff Poole; 9. Imogen Schoots; 10. Alison Lyssa; 11. Philip Myers; 12. Judy Greenwood; 13. Wendy White; 14. Julie-Anne Richard; 15. Margaret Henry; 16. Cathy Rytmeister; 17. James Diack; 18. Kylie Hitchman; 19. Susan Jarnason; 20. Mora Main; 21. Stewart Jackson	320,010	8.60	+5.69
Christian Democrats	1. Gordon Moyes (elected 19); 2. Ross Clifford; 3. Peter Walker; 4. Graham McLennan; 5. George Capsis; 6. Alasdair Webster; 7. Kevin Hume; 8. Gamil Helmy-Kostandy; 9. Shirley Grigg; 10. Elwyn Sheppard; 11. Donald Baker; 12. Barry Small; 13. Beverley Pitt; 14. Warwick Copeland; 15. Ruth Nannelli	112,865	3.03	−0.14
Shooters	1. John Tingle (elected 21); 2. Robert Brown; 3. Dan Field; 4. Suzanne O'Connell; 5. Robyn Bourke; 6. Jo Hall; 7. Joan Maraldo; 8. Don Stewart; 9. Jenny Coates; 10. Ali Ambs; 11. Roger Thwaites; 12. Kenneth Moore; 13. Klaus Schwartz; 14. Dave Cook; 15. John Howden; 16. Janos Beregszaszi; 17. Dal Birrell; 18. Neil McCosker; 19. Colin Fraser; 20. Leon Belgrave; 21. Darryl Cheal	76,133	2.05	+0.38
Hanson Group	1. Pauline Hanson; 2. Trevor Clarke; 3. Zojka Cleary; 4. Peter Carver; 5. Peter Sayegh; 6. John Rose; 7. Ray Wallis; 8. Phillip Downey; 9. Colin Rogers; 10. Kay Earl; 11. Andy Frew; 12. Bill Healey; 13. Marian Hills; 14. Peter Fairall; 15. Noel Clarke; 16. Mark Marinkovich; 17. Michael Kordek	71,368	1.92	+1.92
Democrats	1. James Lantry; 2. Peter Furness; 3. Nina Burridge; 4. Matthew Baird; 5. Vicki Dimond; 6. Peter Zakrzewski; 7. Scilla Rosenberg; 8. Harry Boyle; 9. Pamela Clifford; 10. Sandy King; 11. Brian Day; 12. Theo Phillip; 13. Mary De Merindol; 14. Kate Botting; 15. Julian Swallow; 16. Carolyn McLean; 17. Roy Day; 18. Brenda Padgett; 19. Robyn Kirk	58,494	1.57	−2.44
One Nation NSW	1. Brian Burston; 2. Graham Burston; 3. John Cantwell; 4. Mark Booth; 5. Rosalyn Wright; 6. Stuart McBeth; 7. Kevin Bristow; 8. James O'Brien; 9. Ricky Bailey; 10. Larissa Bailey; 11. Lyn Stackman; 12. Tristen Peden; 13. Edwin Farnsworth; 14. Patricia Vaughan; 15. Sylvia Haley; 16. Jillian Burnage	55,396	1.49	−4.85
Unity	1. Ernest Wong; 2. Hanh Nguyen; 3. Robert Donnelly; 4. Victoria Paramonov; 5. Silma Ihram; 6. Shan Chin Su; 7. Melanie Vere; 8. Vannara Kim; 9. Jason Pham; 10. Parkcie Lam; 11. Thi Nga Tran; 12. Kam Leung; 13. Michael Tongsumrith; 14. Kit Fok; 15. Ping Law; 16. Wayne Yip; 17. Bich Le; 18. Nghiep Lu	52,979	1.42	+0.44
Fishing/Horse Riders/4WD	1. Robert Smith; 2. Glenn Druery; 3. Ruth Green; 4. Frank Sanzari; 5. David Wiseman; 6. Debra Avis; 7. Philip Gilham; 8. Stewart Paterson; 9. Fiona Meller; 10. David Bennis; 11. Deanne Shepherd; 12. Wendy Smallwood; 13. Dean Carpenter; 14. David Hitchcock; 15. Michelle Carpenter; 16. Steven Kaskaniotis; 17. Michael Butcher; 18. Graham Crossley; 19. Antonio Gabrielle; 20. Phillip Bell; 21. Chris Hodgson	39,315	1.06	+0.85
AAFI	1. Janey Woodger; 2. David Kitson; 3. Edwin Woodger; 4. Ken O'Leary; 5. Bob Girvan; 6. Peter James; 7. Frank Corrigan; 8. Roy Butler; 9. Hugh Watkins; 10. Craig Jeffriess; 11. Rex Dobson; 12. John Campbell; 13. Paul Higgins; 14. Tom Moody; 15. Kenneth Spragg	33,409	0.90	+0.59
Save Our Suburbs	1. Tony Recsei; 2. Noel Plumb; 3. Jean Lennane; 4. Marga Van Gennip; 5. Giselle Mawer; 6. Rex Hill; 7. Ross Collins; 8. June Hefferan; 9. Pat Hancock; 10. Hugh Bennett; 11. Colin Audet; 12. Monica Wangmann; 13. Jean Posen; 14. Leigh Wallbank; 15. Carolyn O'Connell; 16. Leanne Gavagna; 17. Andrew Rider; 18. Bernard Laughlan; 19. Mary Minns; 20. Colin Freeman; 21. Ann Mills	18,033	0.48	+0.48
Legal System Reform	1. Ahmed Sokarno; 2. Mike Davis; 3. Valerie Murphy; 4. Antoinette Housego; 5. Wayne Lawrence; 6. Terry Hines; 7. Janette Warby; 8. Catherine Byrne; 9. Maree Breen; 10. Pam Laidler; 11. Elizabeth Thomas; 12. Arthur Kraulis; 13. Gustav Herstik; 14. Gordon The; 15. Terry Bell	9,644	0.26	−0.74
No Privatisation People's Party	1. Samir Bargashoun; 2. Mohammed Daher; 3. Mohamed Derbas; 4. Nivin El Kassir; 5. Maisa Samman; 6. Hussein El-Massri; 7. Mark Ekermawi; 8. Hala Sangari; 9. Mervet Abdallah; 10. Omar Samman; 11. Steven Ajaj; 12. Mariam Berbas; 13. Jennifer Lozi; 14. Norm Chalak; 15. Leila Hbous; 16. Steven Alameddine; 17. Fayez Mahfoud; 18. Ahmad Haddad; 19. Mahmoud Rashid; 20. Ahmed Ibrahim	6,652	0.18	+0.12
Socialist Alliance	1. Lisa Macdonald; 2. John Morris; 3. Raul Bassi; 4. Angela Budai; 5. Jamal Darwand; 6. Naomi Arrowsmith; 7. Darcy Byrne; 8. Michael Schembri; 9 . Karol Florek; 10. Pip Hinman; 11. Kieran Latty; 12. Margaret Perrott; 13. Kylie Witt; 14. John Percy; 15. Ashisha Cunningham; 16. Geoff Payne; 17. Osama Yousif; 18. Angela Luvera; 19. Kim Bullimore; 20. Stephen O'Brien; 21. Jim Knight	5,428	0.15	+0.15
Independent	Alexandra Rivers	874	0.02	+0.02
Independent	Mary Mockler	634	0.02	+0.02
Independent	Michael Middleton	313	0.01	+0.01
Independent	Brian Ellis	261	0.01	+0.01
Independent	Ivor F	249	0.01	0.00
Independent	Peter Consandine	56	0.01	+0.01
Independent	Simon Mitchell	47	0.01	+0.01
Total formal votes		3,721,457	94.66	+1.83
Informal votes		209,851	5.34	−1.83
Turnout		3,931,308	92.02	−1.11

== Continuing members ==
The following MLCs were not up for re-election this year.

Member	Party	Term
Meredith Burgmann	Labor	1999–2007
Jan Burnswoods	Labor	1999–2007
John Della Bosca	Labor	1999–2007
Amanda Fazio	Labor	2000–2007
John Hatzistergos	Labor	1999–2007
Ian MacDonald	Labor	1999–2007
Eddie Obeid	Labor	1999–2007
Henry Tsang	Labor	1999–2007
Patricia Forsythe	Liberal	1999–2007
Don Harwin	Liberal	1999–2007
Charlie Lynn	Liberal	1999–2007
John Ryan	Liberal	1999–2007
Jenny Gardiner	National	1999–2007
Melinda Pavey	National	2002–2007
David Oldfield	One Nation NSW	1999–2007
Arthur Chesterfield-Evans	Democrats	1999–2007
Fred Nile	Christian Democrats	1999–2007
Lee Rhiannon	Greens	1999–2007
Peter Breen	Legal System Reform	1999–2007
Peter Wong	Unity	1999–2007
Malcolm Jones	Outdoor Recreation	1999–2007

== See also ==
- Results of the 2003 New South Wales state election (Legislative Assembly)
- Candidates of the 2003 New South Wales state election
- Members of the New South Wales Legislative Council, 2003–2007
