= 1940 Barwon state by-election =

Election result for Barwon, New South Wales, Australia

A by-election was held for the New South Wales Legislative Assembly electorate of Barwon on 16 November 1940 following the resignation of Ben Wade (Country), to contest the federal seat of Gwydir at the 1940 election, however he was unsuccessful.

== Dates ==
Date	Event
16 August 1940	Ben Wade resigned.
21 September 1940	Federal election
16 October 1940	Writ of election issued by the Speaker of the Legislative Assembly.
25 October 1940	Nominations
16 November 1940	Polling day
29 November 1940	Return of writ

== Results ==
1940 Barwon by-election Saturday 16 November
Party	Candidate	Votes	%	±%
Labor	Roy Heferen	6,246	46.8	
Country	Favel Satterthwaite	3,372	25.3	
Country	Harold Johnston	1,779	13.3	
Labor (N-C)	William McArdle	1,024	7.7	
Country	Loenard Conway	926	9.9	
Total formal votes		13,347	97.1	1.5
Informal votes		399	2.9	+1.5
Turnout		13,746	84.5	−10.8
After distribution of preferences
Labor	Roy Heferen	7,325	54.9	
Country	Favel Satterthwaite	3,762	28.2	
Country	Harold Johnston	2,260	16.9	
Labor gain from Country		Swing	N/A	

Preferences were not distributed to completion.

== See also ==
- Electoral results for the district of Barwon
- List of New South Wales state by-elections
