= Aileen MacDonald =

Australian politician

The Honourable Aileen MacDonald OAM MLC

Member of the New South Wales Legislative Council
- Incumbent
- Assumed office 11 August 2022
- Preceded by: Catherine Cusack

Personal details
- Party: Liberal Party
- Spouse: Scot MacDonald

Aileen MacDonald is an Australian politician who is a member of the New South Wales Legislative Council, representing the Liberal Party. She was first appointed in 2022 to replace Catherine Cusack. MacDonald was a member of the NSW Liberal party's State Executive from 2011 to 2012 and 2018 to 2022. She was Country Vice President of the NSW Liberal Women's Council from 2000 to 2003, 2005 to 2007, 2012 to 2015 and 2017 to 2019. She was appointed Shadow Minister for Youth Justice in 2023.

== Career ==
From 1989 to 2012, MacDonald and her husband ran an agricultural supplies business. In 2009, MacDonald joined the Rotary Club of Guyra and the Chamber of Commerce and was President of the club between 2016 and 2018. MacDonald was Chairperson of Armidale Regional Council’s Regional Growth and Economic Development Committee from 2016 to 2017, and contested the 2017 New South Wales local elections in Armidale. In 2018, MacDonald developed 'Renew Armidale' based on the successful ‘Renew Newcastle’ model.

MacDonald was awarded the 2019 Citizen of Guyra award for her involvement in economic development and service to the community. She was awarded the Medal of the Order of Australia in June 2020 as part of the Queen's Birthday Honours. Immediately prior to entering Parliament, MacDonald was the President of Business New England, and President of the Business NSW Regional Advisory Council.

== Personal life ==
MacDonald and her husband Scot have three children.
