= Robert Leslie Brown =

Australian politician

Robert Brown

Chairman of the Shooters, Fishers and Farmers Party
- Incumbent
- Assumed office 26 February 2005
- Preceded by: David Leyonhjelm

Member of the New South Wales Legislative Council
- In office 3 May 2006 – 23 March 2019
- Preceded by: John Tingle

Personal details
- Born: Robert Leslie Brown; 1950 or 1951 (age 75–76) Leichhardt, New South Wales, Australia
- Party: Shooters, Fishers and Farmers
- Education: Ryde Secondary College
- Alma mater: University of Technology Sydney; University of New England
- Occupation: Construction company executive (James Hardie Industries Ltd); Fishing charter operator (Self-employed)
- Profession: Businessman and politician

Robert Leslie Brown (born 1950/1951) is an Australian politician. He was a Shooters, Fishers and Farmers Party member of the New South Wales Legislative Council from 2006, when he filled a casual vacancy sparked by the retirement of long-time party leader John Tingle, until 2019, when he was defeated for preselection by Mark Banasiak.

== Background and early years ==
Brown was born into a working-class family in the Sydney suburb of Leichhardt. He was raised and attended school in the Ryde district, where he took an interest in hunting. He left school in 1966 at the age of 15 to take an apprenticeship as a fitter and turner at the Cockatoo Island Dockyard, rising to become plant superintendent. Brown left the dockyard in 1978 to take up a management position with a subsidiary of Lend Lease, and remained with the group when it was sold to James Hardie Industries in 1985. He was also involved in a partnership operating a game fishing charter business in Fiji from the 1970s until 1982. He is married with two sons.

== Political career ==
=== Shooters Party ===
Having taken an interest in hunting from an early age, Brown joined the Shooters Party soon after its creation. He was elected to the state committee in 1994, and served in that role until his election as party chairman in 2005. Brown also became involved with a number of shooting lobby groups, serving as state president of the Australian Deer Association from 1995 to 1998 and becoming a life member of the Sporting Shooters Association of Australia.

When the Shooters Party held the balance of power in the Legislative Council of New South Wales, Brown exerted pressure for the passage of the Game and Feral Animal Control Act 2002, which saw the establishment of the Game Council New South Wales and a reduction in restrictions upon hunting of feral animals. However, a government review of the governance of the Game Council, completed in 2013 found that:

"more than a decade after it was established the Game Council has no overarching governance framework; lacks a strategic planning framework; lacks some of the skills, tools and resources to ensure effective compliance with its regulatory framework; has no internal regulatory compliance program, has no approved enterprise-wide risk management framework and has an inadequate policy framework".

— Steve Dunn, Review into the governance of the Game Council.

The Game Council was abolished on 4 July 2013.

=== New South Wales parliament ===
Brown's role as Chairman of the Shooters Party meant that he emerged as a leading contender to enter parliament when long-serving MLC and party leader John Tingle announced his intention to retire in late 2005. Brown was duly confirmed by the party's state conference, and, when Tingle formally resigned in May 2006, Brown was appointed to the resulting casual vacancy in the Legislative Council.
