= Robert Borsak =

Australian politician (born 1953)

The Honourable Robert Borsak MLC

Member of the New South Wales Legislative Council
- Incumbent
- Assumed office 7 September 2010
- Preceded by: Roy Smith

Personal details
- Born: 20 April 1953 (age 73) Sydney, New South Wales, Australia
- Party: Shooters, Fishers and Farmers Party
- Children: Annie Borsak (née Saab)
- Education: University of Technology Sydney
- Occupation: Accountant

Robert Czeslaw Borsak (born 14 August 1953) is an Australian politician who serves as the chairman of the Shooters, Fishers and Farmers Party. He represents the party in the New South Wales Legislative Council. He was chosen by the Shooters and Fishers Party to fill the New South Wales Legislative Council vacancy caused by the death of Roy Smith on 30 July 2010.

During his time in NSW Parliament, Borsak has advocated for more funding and services for rural and regional NSW, defended the rights of law-abiding firearm users, introduced a bill to criminalise attacks on farms by animal rights activists, lobbied for further support of the greyhound racing industry and railed against attempts to restrict recreational fishing. Borsak has also called on the NSW Government to re-negotiate the Murray Darling Basin Plan, to secure a better deal for NSW farmers and regional communities. Borsak also has denied human involvement in climate change, claiming that "scientific research, reports and arguments supporting human blame for climate change, were wrong".

Prior to be being elected to parliament, Borsak acted as Chairman of the Game Council NSW, which sets standards for conservation hunting in Australia.

He is an active hunter and fisher.

He was a guest on the 2014 show Living with the Enemy (Australian TV series)

== Political career ==
Borsak is a member of a number of Legislative Council committees, which scrutinise government activity. He chaired an inquiry into the NSW Government decision to re-locate Sydney's Powerhouse Museum. He has been publicly critical of both the cost of the museum move and the NSW Government's failure to release a business case.

Under Borsak, SFF campaigned on a "biased for the bush" agenda during the 2019 state election campaign, pledging to divert funds and services away from Sydney and towards regional NSW. The party achieved its best ever result at the election, winning three lower house seats. Controversially, despite routine denial of preference deals between SFFP and the Labor Party, Borsak was captured on film encouraging the taxi council to start a grassroots campaign to direct voters to Labor in the run-up to the February 2023 by-election

In 2022, Borsak was criticised for comments that he made suggesting that independent MP Helen Dalton, who had recently left the SFF, "should be clocked." Following Borsak's refusal to apologise for these comments, MPs Roy Butler and Philip Donato later resigned from the party, after failing to remove Borsak as leader.
