= List of mayors of Canterbury (New South Wales) =

People who served as the mayor of the City of Canterbury are:

Mayor	Party	Term start	Term end	Time in office	Notes
John Sproule	Independent	16 June 1879	10 February 1880	239 days	
John Campbell Sharp	Independent	10 February 1880	19 February 1883	3 years, 9 days	
Thomas Austen Davis	Independent	19 February 1883	14 February 1884	360 days	
Benjamin Taylor	Independent	14 February 1884	3 February 1886	1 year, 354 days	
James Slocombe	Independent	3 February 1886	13 February 1888	2 years, 10 days	
John Campbell Sharp	Independent	13 February 1888	24 August 1889	1 year, 192 days	
James McBean	Independent	24 August 1889	12 February 1890	172 days	
James Charles Stone	Independent	12 February 1890	11 February 1891	364 days	
John Quigg	Independent	11 February 1891	19 February 1892	1 year, 8 days	
Patrick Joseph Scahill	Independent	19 February 1892	15 February 1895	2 years, 361 days	
Sydney Robert Lorking	Independent	15 February 1895	16 February 1899	4 years, 1 day	
George Wallace Nicoll	Independent	16 February 1899	16 February 1900	1 year	
Jeffrey Denniss	Independent	16 February 1900	11 February 1904	3 years, 360 days	
Benjamin Taylor	Independent	11 February 1904	16 February 1906	2 years, 5 days	
Jeffrey Denniss	Independent	16 February 1906	10 February 1908	1 year, 359 days	
John Edward Draper	Independent	10 February 1908	February 1910	2 years	
John McCulloch	Independent	February 1910	February 1911	1 year	
Patrick Joseph Scahill	Independent	February 1911	February 1912	1 year	
John Edward Draper	Liberal Reform	February 1912	10 February 1913	1 year	
George Frederick Wells Hocking	Labor	10 February 1913	March 1914	1 year	
James Augustus Wilson	Labor	March 1914	February 1917	2 years	
Arthur Preston	Independent	February 1917	February 1920	3 years	
George Frederick Wells Hocking	Labor	February 1920	11 December 1922	2 years, 304 days	
John Henry Ewen	Citizens' Progress Party	11 December 1922	7 December 1925	2 years, 361 days	
Norman Rydge	Labor	7 December 1925	20 December 1926	1 year, 13 days	
Eric Howard Stephenson	Labor	20 December 1926	19 December 1927	364 days	
Asa North	Labor	19 December 1927	10 December 1928	357 days	
George Harold Bramston	Citizens' Progress Party	10 December 1928	8 January 1932	3 years, 29 days	
Stanley Parry	Independent	8 January 1932	August 1947	15 years, 211 days	
Harold McPherson		7 August 1947	December 1948	1 year, 121 days	
Colin Williams		December 1948	6 December 1949	1 year	
Samuel Warren		6 December 1949	December 1951	2 years	
Herbert Reuben Thorncraft		6 December 1951	December 1953	2 years	
George Herbert Mulder	Labor	December 1953	December 1956	3 years	
Stanley Charles Reuben Squire		December 1956	December 1957	1 year	
R. J. Schofield	Independent	December 1957	December 1958	1 year	
Stanley Charles Reuben Squire		December 1958	10 December 1959	1 year	
R. J. Schofield	Independent	10 December 1959	December 1962	3 years	
Ronald Gordon Pate		December 1962	8 December 1963	1 year	
James Schofield Scott	Labor	8 December 1963	10 December 1965	2 years, 2 days	
Alfred James Pate	Independent	10 December 1965	December 1967	2 years	
James William Eccles		5 December 1967	December 1968	1 year	
Allan Mulder	Labor	8 December 1968	December 1969	1 year	
James William Eccles		December 1969	December 1970	1 year	
James Beaman		December 1970	September 1971	281 days	
Colin Gordon Williams		September 1971	September 1976	5 years	
John Mountford	Labor	September 1976	October 1980	4 years, 30 days	
Kevin Moss	Labor	October 1980	September 1987	6 years, 335 days	
John Gorrie	Labor	September 1987	September 1995	8 years	
Kayee Griffin	Labor	September 1995	January 2004	8 years, 122 days	
Robert Furolo	Labor	January 2004	21 October 2011	7 years, 273 days	
Brian Robson	Labor	1 November 2011	12 May 2016	4 years, 193 days	
