= Australian Deer Association =

The Australian Deer Association Inc (ADA) is an Australian not-for-profit association incorporated in South Australia with branches in all states and territories.

The Australian Deer Association was established on September 5, 1969 (first named as the Australian Deer Hunters Association) to be advocates for deer herds and deer hunting.

The ADA promotes scientific research into deer, retention of habitat, and lobbies on legislation regarding deer and recreational hunting.

The objectives of Australian Deer Association are listed in their constitution as:

- The improvement of the status of deer in Australia,
- The promotion of research into the habits of deer; and the scientific study of deer in Australia and their relationship to the Australian environment,
- The promotion, application and publication of the methods of management and control of deer whether semi-domesticated or wild,
- The retention and improvement of habitat for deer and other wildlife, particularly by encouraging governments to pass legislation and make regulations based on sound management principles,
- The preservation, and where appropriate the generating of deer hunting as a legitimate sport,
- The preservation and extension of public access to the Australian bushland for recreational use, and the encouragement of such use,
- The preservation of the environment,
- The education of hunters in the safe handling of firearms, and,
- The personal adoption by members of the Association's Code

Membership to the Australian Deer Association is considered by most states of Australia as a genuine reason for a weapons licence.

The association is involved in hunter education, including firearm safety and R Class licenses for the New South Wales Game Council.

Since 1972, the ADA has run the Australian Antlered Trophy Register, using the Douglas Scoring System to measure and score the antlers of deer trophies. Scoring had up till then been a localised approach, and the implementation of the scheme allowed a national approach. The scores were first published by the association in 1976.

From 1976 until 2023 the ADA published a magazine, Australian Deer, with 6 editions per year. In 2024 this was reduced to 4 editions per year.
