= Roy Butler (Australian politician) =

Australian politician

Roy Butler MP
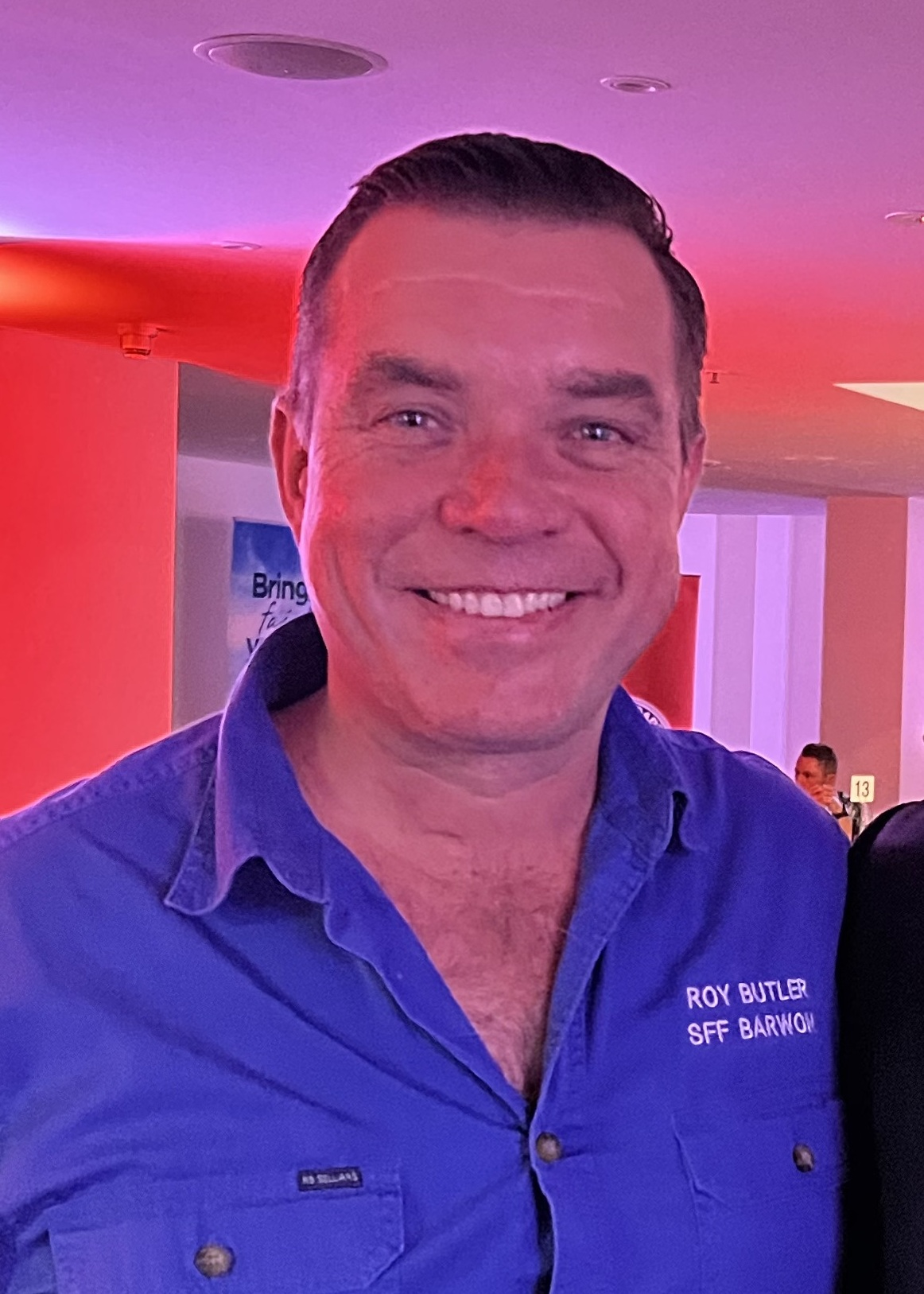
- Butler in 2022

Member of the New South Wales Parliament for Barwon
- Incumbent
- Assumed office 23 March 2019
- Preceded by: Kevin Humphries

Personal details
- Born: 22 March 1977 (age 49)
- Party: Independent (2022–present)
- Other political affiliations: Shooters, Fishers and Farmers (2019–2022)
- Occupation: Western Region Manager of the NSW Police senior vice president of Sporting Shooters Australia

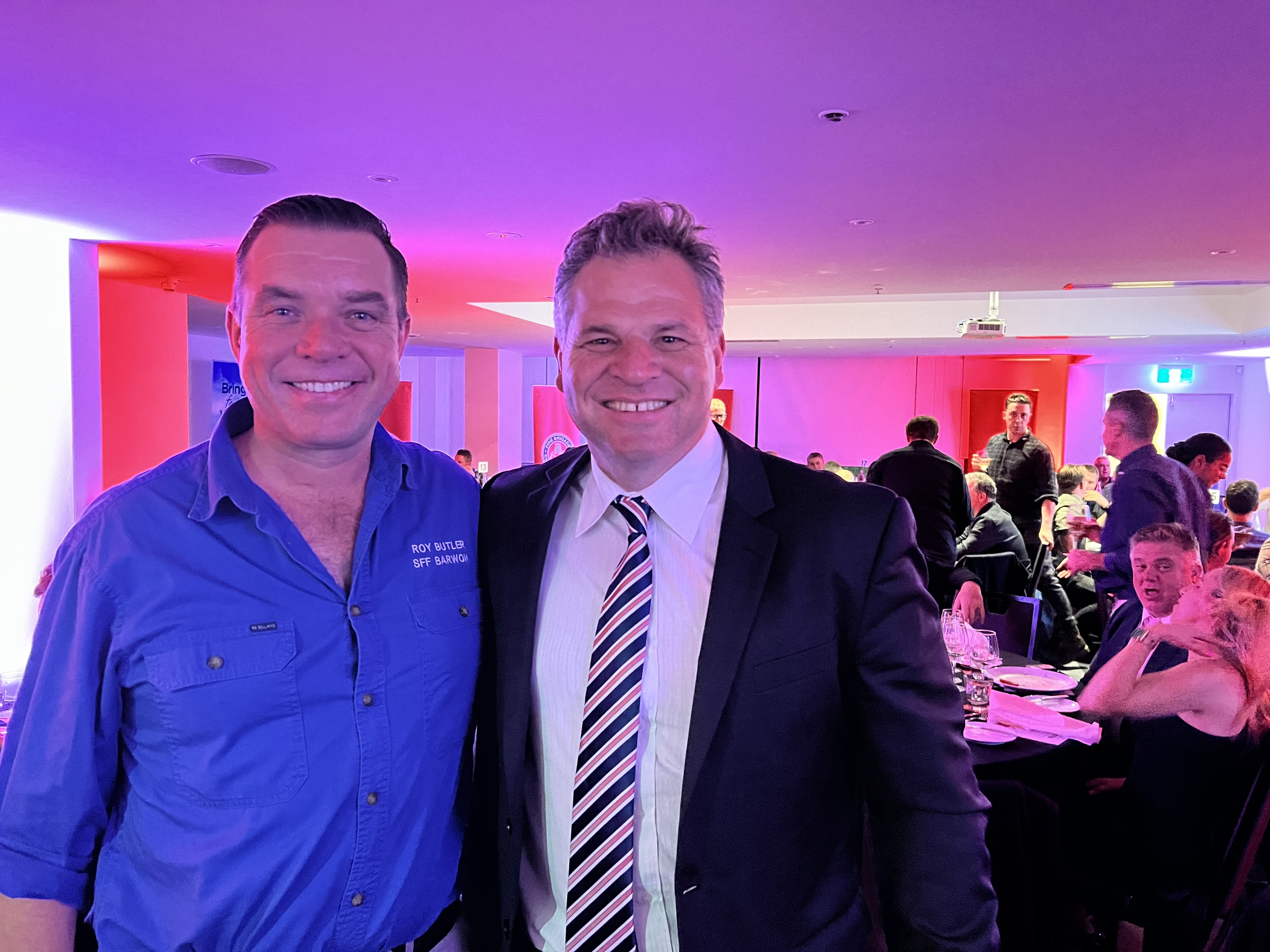
Roy Butler (left) with fellow SFF MP (later independent) Phil Donato at a 2022 Fire Brigade Employees' Union event.

Royal Francis Butler (born 22 March 1977) is an Australian politician who has been a member of the New South Wales Legislative Assembly since March 2019, representing the electoral district of Barwon as an independent. He is a former member of the Shooters, Fishers and Farmers Party. Butler first won the seat in 2019, taking it from the Nationals for the first time in almost sixty years. He was returned for a second term at the 2023 state election.

== Early life ==
After finishing school at St Joseph's College as a boarder, Roy enlisted in the Australian Army. After basic and Infantry IETs he was posted to Brisbane with the Royal Australian Regiment, where he was in the reconnaissance sniper platoon.

Roy completed a Postgraduate Diploma in Addictions Counselling and Group Psychotherapy. For three months, he lived as part of a treatment population and participated in one-on-one counselling as a counsellor. After completing study, he started working for Corrective Services NSW.

Roy worked in the NSW prison system as a drug and alcohol counsellor and group psychotherapist. Then moved into delivering and coordinating offender management programs across the Sydney metropolitan area and in western New South Wales.

In 2004, Roy started work with the Department of Ageing, Disability and Home Care as a manager of community access, where he led teams of physiotherapists, occupational therapists, speech pathologists, psychologists and case workers across western New South Wales who all delivered services to people with intellectual disabilities.

After five years in ageing and disability, Roy was appointed as regional manager of the Western Region of the NSW Police Force.

In 2012 and 2013, he completed an Executive Master of Public Administration through the Australia and New Zealand School of Government.

Roy was also the Senior Vice President of SSAA NSW branch.

== Political career ==
Roy was first elected as the NSW State Member for Barwon at the March 2019 election for the Shooters, Fishers and Farmers Party with a 19.5% swing away from the Nationals Party that had previously held the seat for 65 years. The swing away from the traditionally National party held seat was due to the party's mishandling of issues in the bush, particularly water. The 2019 election saw three members of the Shooters, Fishers and Farmers Party elected to the Legislative Assembly. On 12 December 2022, Roy resigned from the Shooters, Fishers and Farmers Party along with Phil Donato MP over disparaging comments made by the party leader, Robert Borsak, about former party member-turned-independent MP, Helen Dalton.

In 2023, Roy was re-elected as an independent, making history as the first independent to be elected to the seat of Barwon with a 9.4% swing towards him.

=== Committee Work ===
Member, Joint Select Committee on the NSW Reconstruction Authority	14 March 2024
Chair, Legislative Assembly Committee on Investment, Industry and Regional Development	22 June 2023
Member, Joint Standing Committee on Road Safety	22 June 2023
Member, Legislative Assembly Committee on Investment, Industry and Regional Development	22 June 2023
Member for Barwon	23 March 2019
Member of the NSW Legislative Assembly	23 March 2019

New South Wales Legislative Assembly
Preceded by Kevin Humphries	Member for Barwon; 2019–present	Incumbent
