= Geoff Crawford =

Australian politician

The Honourable Geoff Crawford

Minister for Agriculture
- In office 5 March 1968 – 16 December 1975
- Preceded by: Bill Chaffey
- Succeeded by: Bruce Cowan

Personal details
- Born: 16 December 1916 Inverell, New South Wales
- Died: 29 December 1998 (aged 82) Port Macquarie, New South Wales
- Party: Country Party

Military service
- Allegiance: Australia
- Branch/service: Second Australian Imperial Force
- Years of service: 1940–1945
- Rank: Sergeant
- Unit: 2/13th Battalion
- Battles/wars: Second World War; North African Campaign; New Guinea campaign
- Awards: Distinguished Conduct Medal

Geoffrey Robertson Crawford, DCM (16 December 1916 – 29 December 1998) was an Australian politician. He was a member of the New South Wales Legislative Assembly for the Country Party from 1950 to 1976, and served as Minister for Agriculture from 1968 until 1975.

Crawford was born in Inverell, New South Wales and educated at a state high school. He initially worked as a farm hand and share farmer before buying his own farm in the Inverell district. He served in the Second Australian Imperial Force in North Africa and New Guinea and received the Distinguished Conduct Medal in 1944. Crawford was elected to the New South Wales Parliament as the Country Party member for Barwon at the 1950 state election. He defeated the sitting member Roy Heferen who had been disendorsed by the Labor Party after breaking caucus solidarity during an indirect election of the New South Wales Legislative Council. Crawford held the seat for the next 8 elections. He retired at the 1976 state election. During the premierships of Robert Askin and Tom Lewis he was Minister for Agriculture. He also held various parliamentary positions including Chairman of Committees and Deputy Speaker.

New South Wales Legislative Assembly
Preceded by Roy Heferen	Member for Barwon; 1950–1976	Succeeded by Wal Murray
Political offices
Preceded by Bill Chaffey	Minister for Agriculture; 1968–1975	Succeeded by Bruce Cowan
