= Kevin Humphries =

Australian politician

Minister for Western New South Wales
- In office 4 April 2011 – 2 April 2015
- Premier: Barry O'Farrell; Mike Baird
- Preceded by: New position
- Succeeded by: John Barilaro (as Minister for Regional Development)

Minister for Natural Resources, Lands and Water
- In office 23 April 2014 – 2 April 2015
- Premier: Mike Baird
- Preceded by: Katrina Hodgkinson (as Minister for Primary Industries)
- Succeeded by: Niall Blair (as Minister for Lands and Water)

Minister for Mental Health
- In office 4 April 2011 – 23 April 2014
- Premier: Barry O'Farrell
- Preceded by: Barbara Perry
- Succeeded by: Jai Rowell

Minister for Healthy Lifestyles
- In office 4 April 2011 – 23 April 2014
- Premier: Barry O'Farrell

Member of the New South Wales Parliament for Barwon
- In office 24 March 2007 – 1 March 2019
- Preceded by: Ian Slack-Smith
- Succeeded by: Roy Butler

Personal details
- Born: 2 April 1960 (age 66) Tamworth, New South Wales, Australia
- Party: The Nationals
- Spouse: Linda Humphries
- Children: Three
- Occupation: Teacher
- Website: Kevin Humphries MP at the Wayback Machine (archived 2015-02-23)

Kevin John Humphries (born 2 April 1960), an Australian politician, was a member of the New South Wales Legislative Assembly representing Barwon for the Nationals from 2007 to 2019. He was the Minister for Healthy Lifestyles and Mental Health between 2011 and 2014 in the O'Farrell government; and the Minister for Western New South Wales from April 2011 to 2015. In April 2014, he was appointed as Minister for Natural Resources, Lands and Water during the Cabinet reshuffle under Premier Mike Baird.

== Early years and background ==
Kevin Humphries is the son of Eileen and Frank Humphries who were married in Tamworth in 1958. He grew in Tamworth and attended St Edward's Primary School which was run at the time by the Sisters of St Joseph. He would on to complete his secondary education at the Christian Brothers College.

Kevin Humphries obtained a scholarship to study at the Catholic Teachers College in Strathfield. He then went to complete a Bachelor of Education externally through University of New England in Armidale, New South Wales. He obtained a Graduate Diploma of Religious Studies (Grad Dip RE) through the Australian Catholic University in Brisbane.

His first teaching position was in 1981 at St Patricks Primary School in Walcha. It was in Walcha that he met his wife and where they were in 1985. They moved to Tamworth and he taught secondary school at Rosary College for four years. He then went on to become the Principal at Sacred Heart School at Boggabri, principal at Sacred Heart School at Geeveston in Tasmania and finally as principal at St Philomena's School in Moree in 1995.

It was in Moree in 1995 that Kevin Humphries first became a director of the Aboriginal Employment Strategy. In 2001 he left the school system and began a management consultancy company. His company specialised in worked in the cotton industry, aged care and the retirement sector. In 2002 he became chair of the New England and North West Area Consultative Committee which was a Federal Regional Partnerships Program set up by the Australian Government.

== Political career ==
Due to the resignation of Barry O'Farrell as Premier, and the subsequent ministerial reshuffle by Mike Baird, the new Liberal Leader, in April 2014 Humphries was promoted as Minister for Natural Resources, Lands and Water and retained the portfolio as Minister for Western New South Wales in the Baird ministry. Humphries lost his Cabinet roles in April 2015 due to a post-election reshuffle. Humphries was a member of Parliament as the Member for Barwon from 2007 until his retirement in 2019.

== Personal life ==
Humprhies is married to Linda and has two sons and a daughter.

New South Wales Legislative Assembly
Preceded by Ian Slack-Smith	Member for Barwon; 2007–2019	Succeeded by Roy Butler
Political offices
New office	Minister for Western New South Wales; 2011–2015	Succeeded by Adam Marshall as Minister for Agriculture and Western New South Wales
Preceded by Barbara Perry as Minister Assisting the Minister for Health (Mental Health)	Minister for Healthy Lifestyles and Mental Health; 2011–2014	Succeeded by Jai Rowell as Minister for Mental Health and Assistant Minister for Health
Preceded by Katrina Hodgkinson as Minister for Primary Industries	Minister for Natural Resources, Lands and Water; 2014–2015	Succeeded by Niall Blair
