= Catherine Cusack (politician) =

Australian politician

The Honourable Catherine Cusack MLC

Member of the New South Wales Legislative Council
- In office 22 March 2003 – 9 August 2022
- Succeeded by: Aileen MacDonald

Personal details
- Born: 26 October 1963 (age 63)
- Party: Liberal Party

Catherine Eileen Cusack (born 26 October 1963) is a former Australian politician who was a member of the New South Wales Legislative Council, representing the Liberal Party. She was first elected as an opposition member on 22 March 2003 and was re-elected in 2011 and 2019 when her party won government.

== Biography ==
In her inaugural parliamentary speech, Cusack identified herself as the great-granddaughter of a former Labor politician, John Cusack. She grew up near Yass in southern New South Wales, daughter of Greg Cusack (born 1930), a former Australian motor racing and motor rally champion. She joined the Young Liberals while studying economics at Sydney University and was elected their first female president in 1985. At the same time, a young Anthony Albanese from Sydney University's Young Labor challenged Cusack twice to a debate while she did not respond, recalling him as a young left-wing “firebrand.” Albanese subsequently became Prime Minister in 2022. Cusack worked for Greiner government minister Virginia Chadwick in the Community Services and Education portfolios. She left in 1992 to work in the private sector, moving to the NSW Far North Coast in 2000 following the appointment of her husband to the Northern Rivers Area Health Service.

In 1995 she sought preselection to fill the Legislative Council vacancy caused by the resignation of Stephen Mutch but was defeated by Mike Gallacher.

== Parliamentary career ==
In 2003, then-Liberal leader John Brogden appointed her to Shadow Cabinet in the Juvenile Justice and Women's portfolios. She later served as Shadow Minister for Climate Change and Environmental Sustainability. When her party won government at the 2011 election, she was removed from the frontbench by premier Barry O'Farrell, allegedly for having alienated the Shooters and Fishers Party by saying she would not allow hunting in national parks.

In May 2011, Cusack received wide political support for a strong critique of her government's decision to retrospectively alter a Solar Bonus Scheme, by cutting tariffs from 60 to 40 cents for customers who had signed up before November 2010 under the previous government.

Cusack was Chair of the Commonwealth Women Parliamentarians and represented Australia at the Women in Parliaments Global Forum in Amman 2016 and chaired a workshop on "Political Violence Against Women".

At a hearing of the NSW Parliament's Standing Committee on Social Issues in March 2013, Cusack expressed feeling "excluded and often looked down upon by gay culture." She also accused the AIDS Council of NSW (ACON) and the gay community in general of "looking down on women and deliberately excluding them from efforts to combat AIDS."

Cusack served as Parliamentary Secretary to Premier Mike Baird from 2015 until he retired in January 2017. Premier Gladys Berejikjlian who was elected unopposed as Baird's replacement, appointed Ms Cusack as Parliamentary Secretary for Education & the Hunter. Two months later in February 2017, she resigned for sending an email to Premier Gladys Berejiklian, criticising her cabinet appointments and her colleagues. In January 2018, she was re-appointed as a Parliamentary Secretary for Digital Inclusion as well as Parliamentary Secretary for Cost of Living, initiating programs such as the Cost of Living Officer.

In November 2018, Cusack won preselection for the Liberal Party's Upper House northern province against Scot Macdonald, and was subsequently re-elected at the preceding 2019 NSW state election for an eight-year term ending in 2027.

Cusack again lost her Parliamentary Secretary position when in November 2020 she crossed the floor on the controversial Local Land Services Amendment Bill 2020.

Cusack advocates for children of prisoners, reforms to reduce the number of women in prison and assist their transition post release. Cusack hosts the Annual Women Keeping Women Out of Prison Breakfast at NSW Parliament, and is an Ambassador for "Dress for Success" (a charity that assists women leaving prison).

In March 2022, Cusack announced she would resign from parliament over the federal government's handling of the flooding disaster on Australia's east coast. On 19 May 2022, Cusack said that the earliest practical date for her resignation was the first week in August 2022. She resigned on 9 August and was replaced by Aileen MacDonald.

== Personal life ==
Cusack moved with her young family to Alstonville in 2000 following the appointment of her husband, Chris Crawford as CEO of The Northern Rivers Area Health Service.
