= Game and Feral Animal Control Act 2002 =

The Game and Feral Animal Control Act 2002 is an act to manage and regulate the hunting of game in New South Wales in Australia.

The Act established the Game Council New South Wales. The legislation protected feral deer to ensure populations would remain available to hunt and required hunters to acquire appropriate licenses before hunting deer. Farmers who considered feral deer a nuisance, called for the legislation to be overturned. Since its enaction, several regulations have been added to the law, in response to concerns by landowners. In 2013, the Game Council New South Wales was abolished.

== See also ==
- Hunting in Australia
- Hunting license
