= John Tingle =

Australian politician (1931–2022)

The Honourable John Tingle

Chairman of the Shooters Party
- In office 2 May 1992 – 27 March 1999
- Preceded by: Party established
- Succeeded by: Robert Borsak

Member of the New South Wales Legislative Council
- In office 25 March 1995 – 2 May 2006
- Succeeded by: Robert Brown

Personal details
- Born: John Saxon Tingle; 2 November 1931 Edgecliff, New South Wales, Australia
- Died: 5 August 2022 (aged 90)
- Party: Shooters, Fishers and Farmers
- Spouses: Pamela Chivers (m. 1956; div. 1976) Gail Tingle (m. 1980; div. 2012)
- Children: Peter; Sally; Laura
- Education: Sydney Boys High School
- Profession: Journalist, politician and broadcaster

John Saxon Tingle (2 November 1931 – 5 August 2022) was an Australian politician, journalist and broadcaster. He was the founder of the Shooters Party in New South Wales, and was a member of the New South Wales Legislative Council from 1995 until 2006.

== Early life ==
Born in Edgecliff, Sydney, Tingle attended Sydney Boys High School from 1944 to 1949.

== Radio and TV career ==
He was a broadcaster and news editor in Deniliquin from 1949 to 1951 before becoming a journalist for the ABC from 1951 to 1968. During that time, he was supervisor of ABC TV News and chief of staff of the ABC News service, among other positions.

He switched to commercial radio in 1969. Tingle said his decision to leave the ABC and venture into talkback on commercial radio was influenced by Ormsby Wilkins. Wilkins was notable for taking the very first legal talkback calls on radio in Australia.

Tingle presented current affairs programs on stations including 2UE, 2UW, Radio Australia, 2SM (1978–1982), 3AW in Melbourne (1996), and 4BK in Brisbane (1997), before returning to 2SM.

He then worked at 2GB (1982–1992) and 2CH (1992–1995). Originally presenting the 2GB morning program between 9am and 12pm, Tingle was forced to move to an afternoon timeslot in 1985 when the station managed to sign John Laws to a three-year contract to host the morning show.

In 1977, Tingle established the Australian Telephone Users' Defence Union to advocate against the seemingly questionable accuracy of the accounting and billing system used by Telecom Australia. In the early 1980s, Tingle used his radio show to protest against backdated electricity charges, forwarding 3,000 complaints to the Ombudsman. The Ombudsman later found that the charging was illegal and the retrospective charging was discontinued.

During his radio career, Tingle also presented TV programs on Seven and Nine in Sydney, ABC TV Queensland and Northern Territory, WIN4 Wollongong and SBS. Two of Tingle's Channel Nine programs included the Sunday morning current affairs program Probe and a Sunday evening program called Police Five.

His 1982 radio documentary on the Polish background of Pope John Paul II won a United Nations Association of Australia Media Peace Prize.

== Political career ==
Tingle founded the Shooters Party in 1992. Tingle had said he was compelled to establish the Shooters Party after increasing regulation of gun ownership in Australia which included the 1992 Firearms Act introduced into New South Wales parliament by police minister Ted Pickering. Pickering's description of shooters as lazy, inert and apathetic prompted Tingle to register the Shooters Party on Friday 15 May 1992, with 10,000 members.

In his maiden speech, Tingle said he represented the thousands of outdoor enthusiasts who did not pose a threat to anyone and were frustrated that their activities were becoming limited by a confusing array of laws and regulations that made little sense and seemed to have no benefit. He was the party's vice-chairman until August 2013, when he resigned from the party due to a disagreement regarding the party's direction.

He rejoined in 2019, and was reinstated as patron and founder.

Despite being the founder of the Shooters Party, Tingle at one time denied a claim made by a journalist he was leader of the party.

In 1995, he was elected to the New South Wales Legislative Council as a Shooters Party (later Shooters, Fishers and Farmers Party) member, serving for eleven years until his resignation in 2006. His decision to resign came after he was diagnosed with aggressive prostate cancer in late 2005, a disease from which his father died in 1994.

During his time in parliament, he initiated seven successful bills, served on the Staysafe Committee for 11 years, and on the Ministerial Advisory Council on Shooting Clubs for 10 years.

Tingle was vocal in his opposition to the Howard government's proposal to reform Australia's gun laws following the Port Arthur massacre in 1996, although he agreed there was no need for average Australians to have access to semi-automatic or pump-action shotguns. He later described the period following the massacre as his "most unpleasant memory" due to the death threats he and his family received for several months, and the need to be protected by a Special Branch bodyguard.

In 2007, he was appointed to the NSW Administrative Decisions Tribunal.

== Personal life ==
Tingle had three children. His daughter, Laura Tingle, is a political journalist in Canberra, and chief political correspondent of the ABC current affairs program, 7.30.
