= Ian Slack-Smith =

Australian politician

Ian Lindsay Slack-Smith MP (born 1946) is a former Australian politician, elected as a member of the New South Wales Legislative Assembly.

Slack-Smith was born in Narrabri and educated at The King's School, Sydney. He is married with five children. He represented Barwon for the National Party from 1995 to his retirement at the 2007 election.

== Notes ==
New South Wales Legislative Assembly
Preceded by Wal Murray	Member for Barwon; 1995 – 2007	Succeeded by Kevin Humphries
