= Wal Murray =

Australian politician

Personal details
- Born: 11 September 1931
- Died: 15 July 2004 (aged 72)
- Party: National Party
- Occupation: Politician

Wallace Telford John Murray AO (11 September 1931 – 15 July 2004) was an Australian politician, elected as a member of the New South Wales Legislative Assembly. He was a National Party member for the seat of Barwon from 1 May 1976 until 3 March 1995. He was Deputy Premier of New South Wales from 25 March 1988 until 26 May 1993.

Murray had originally decided to stay on as Deputy Premier and National Party leader until his retirement at the 1995 state election but was persuaded to retire from Cabinet and thus as Deputy Premier and National Party leader early in May 1993 by Liberal Premier John Fahey due to Fahey's desire to reshuffle his Cabinet.

New South Wales Legislative Assembly
| Preceded by Geoff Crawford | Member for Barwon; 1976–1995 | Succeeded by Ian Slack-Smith |
Party political offices
| Preceded by James Bruxner | Deputy Leader of the New South Wales National Country Party; 1981–1984 | Succeeded by Ian Armstrong |
| Preceded by Leon Punch | Leader of the New South Wales National Party; 1985–1993 | Succeeded by Ian Armstrong |
Political offices
| Preceded by Ron Mulock | Deputy Premier of New South Wales; 1988–1993 | Succeeded by Ian Armstrong |
