= Jon Jenkins =

Australian politician

Jon Gordon Jenkins (born 17 June 1958) is an Australian virologist, information technologist and former state parliamentarian who represented the Outdoor Recreation Party in the New South Wales Legislative Council from 2003 to 2007.

== Early life ==
Jenkins commenced a combined Law/Science degree at Macquarie University, then decided to pursue a career in the natural sciences and medicine. He graduated BSc (Hons) and completed a PhD degree, being awarded the University Prize for his postgraduate work in virology, which was followed by studies of viral coat proteins, protein structure prediction, artificial intelligence in medicine, virtual surgery and 3D imagery construction.

Prior to being elected to Parliament, Dr Jenkins worked in private industry and as a medical-education consultant. He was a lecturer in the Medical and IT schools at Bond University in Queensland and was retained for a time as an adjunct professor.

== Parliamentary career ==
Jenkins was appointed in October 2003 to fill a casual vacancy from the resignation of Malcolm Jones. He resigned the seat in February 2007, not contesting the March election. He professed himself to be "anti-Green" and constructed a vitriolic web page "Dedicated to Debunking Junk Green Science".
