= Electoral district of Barwon =

State electoral district of New South Wales, Australia

Barwon New South Wales—Legislative Assembly
- Interactive map of district boundaries from the 2023 state election
- State: New South Wales
- Dates current: 1894–1904; 1927–present
- MP: Roy Butler
- Party: Independent
- Namesake: Barwon River
- Electors: 53,735 (2023)
- Area: 356,291.70 km^{2} (137,565.0 sq mi)
- Demographic: Rural
Electorates around Barwon:
South Australia	Queensland	Queensland
South Australia	Barwon	Northern Tablelands; Tamworth
South Australia	Cootamundra; Murray	Dubbo; Upper Hunter

Barwon is an electoral district of the Legislative Assembly in the Australian state of New South Wales. It is represented by Roy Butler, a former member of the Shooters, Fishers and Farmers Party who is now an independent MP.

Covering roughly 44% of the land mass of New South Wales, Barwon is by far the state's largest electoral district. It includes the local government areas of Bourke Shire, Brewarrina Shire, Narrabri Shire, Walgett Shire, Warrumbungle Shire, Coonamble Shire, Gilgandra Shire, Warren Shire, Bogan Shire, Lachlan Shire, Cobar Shire, Central Darling Shire, the City of Broken Hill as well as the large Unincorporated Far West Region surrounding Broken Hill.

== History ==
Barwon was originally created in 1894, when it along with Moree, replaced Gwydir. In 1904, with the downsizing of the Legislative Assembly after Federation, Gwydir was recreated and Moree and Barwon were abolished. In 1927, with the breakup of the three-member Electoral district of Namoi, it was recreated.

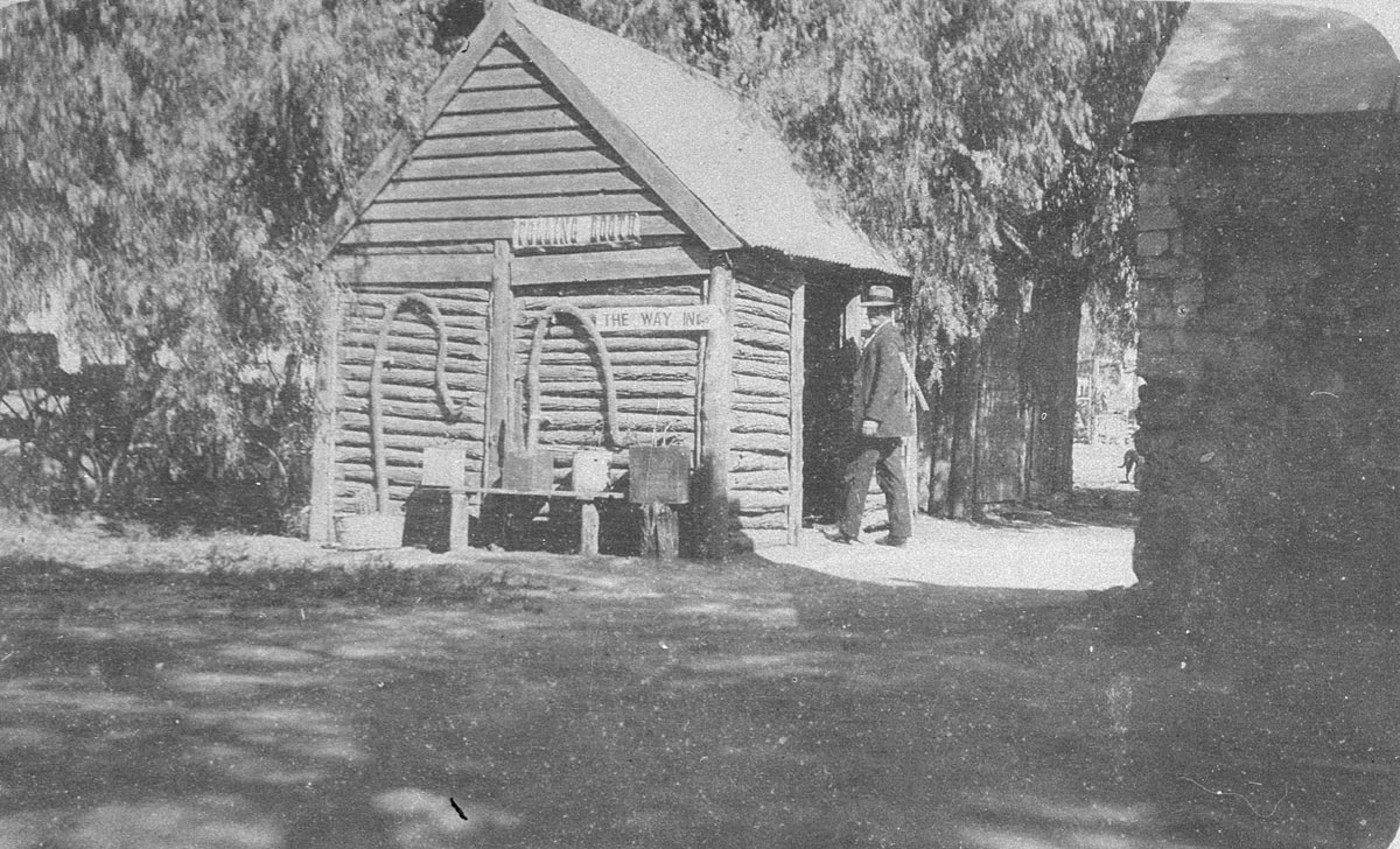
Polling booth, Double Gates Hotel, c.1914

Originally a marginal seat that traded hands between the Labor Party and the conservative parties, it was considered a safe seat for the National Party who held it without interruption from 1950 until 2019, when it was won by the Shooters, Fishers and Farmers Party.

== Members for Barwon ==
First incarnation (1894–1904)
Member	Party	Term
William Willis	Protectionist	1894–1901
William Willis	Progressive	1901–1904
Second incarnation (1927–present)
Member	Party	Term
Walter Wearne	Nationalist	1927–1930
Bill Ratcliffe	Labor	1930–1932
Ben Wade	Country	1932–1940
Roy Heferen	Labor	1940–1950
Geoff Crawford	Country	1950–1976
Wal Murray	Country, National	1976–1995
Ian Slack-Smith	National	1995–2007
Kevin Humphries	National	2007–2019
Roy Butler	Shooters, Fishers, Farmers	2019–2022
Roy Butler	Independent	2022–present

== Election results ==
2023 New South Wales state election: Barwon
Party	Candidate	Votes	%	±%
Independent	Roy Butler	19,630	44.78	+44.78
National	Annette Turner	11,158	25.45	−4.93
Labor	Joshua Roberts-Garnsey	6,816	15.55	−5.37
Shooters, Fishers, Farmers	Paul Britton	2,983	6.80	−26.16
Legalise Cannabis	Ben Hartley	1,591	3.63	+3.63
Greens	Pat Schultz	881	2.01	−1.01
Independent	Stuart Howe	460	1.05	+1.05
Public Education	Thomas McBride	318	0.73	+0.73
Total formal votes		43,837	96.94	+0.49
Informal votes		1,384	3.06	−0.49
Turnout		45,221	84.16	−2.64
Notional two-party-preferred count
National	Annette Turner	15,971	60.76	+8.24
Labor	Joshua Roberts-Garnsey	10,316	39.24	−8.24
Two-candidate-preferred result
Independent	Roy Butler	23,868	65.99	+65.99
National	Annette Turner	12,299	34.01	−9.39
Member changed to Independent from Shooters, Fishers, Farmers				
