= Kayee Griffin =

Australian politician

Member of Legislative Council of New South Wales
- In office 22 March 2003 – 4 March 2011

Personal details
- Born: 6 February 1950 (age 76) Sydney
- Party: Labor Party

Kayee Frances Griffin (born 6 February 1950) is an Australian politician and former Labor Party member of the New South Wales Legislative Council, serving from 2003 until her retirement in 2011.

Griffin was born in Sydney to parents Matt and Kathleen Griffin. She grew up in the City of Canterbury. After leaving school, she was employed with the Department of Labour and Industry and the New South Wales Treasury between 1967 and 1979. She became a member of the Municipal Employees Union (MEU) in 1981 and an organiser in 1987, continuing in that role until 1996. In 1979 she became an electoral advisor for Federal MP Leo McLeay. In 1981 she became the Secretary for the Mayor of Canterbury, before returning to her earlier role with McLeay in 1997.

She joined the Labor Party in 1973 and was a member of the Lakemba Branch, becoming Secretary in 1979. She was the convenor of the Party's 'Status of Women Committee' between 1996 and 1999, and also the chairperson of the Party's Local Government Administrative Committee in 1999.

In 1991 she was elected an alderman of Canterbury Municipal Council and in 1995 she became its mayor. On council, she served with fellow parliamentarians John Hatzistergos and Tony Stewart.

In 1995 she was elected vice president of the United Services Union, the successor to the MEU, and continued in that role until 1999 when she became Senior Vice President. She held that role until 2003 when she was elected to Parliament.

Prior to her election to Parliament, she was a member of:

- Canterbury Area Health Board.
- Lang Area Health Board.
- Local Government Association of NSW Executive 1996.
- Sydney Water Corporate Customer Council.
- NSW Council on Violence Against Women .
- Energy Industry Ombudsman Council.
- Southern Sydney Region of Councils.

She stood as a candidate for the Australian Labor Party in the 2003 Legislative Council Wales election. She was placed ninth on the Labor Party Group ticket and was the 17th person elected to the Council at that election, serving an eight-year term.

She was the Legislative Council Representative on the Council of the University of Newcastle between 7 May 2003 and 21 December 2004. She was Deputy President and Chair of Committees between 24 November 2009 and 4 March 2011.

New South Wales Legislative Council
Preceded by Amanda Fazio	Deputy President; 2009–2011	Succeeded by Jenny Gardiner
Civic offices
Preceded by John Gorrie	Mayor of Canterbury; 1995–2004	Succeeded by Robert Furolo
