= Roy Heferen =

Australian politician (1898–1961)

Personal details
- Born: 2 June 1898 Coonabarabran, New South Wales
- Died: 9 June 1961 (aged 63) Moree, New South Wales
- Party: Labor Party and Independent Labor

Stephen Roy Heferen (2 June 1898 – 9 June 1961) was an Australian politician. He was a member of the New South Wales Legislative Assembly from 1941 until 1950. During his parliamentary career he was a member of the Labor Party (ALP) but sat as an Independent Labor member between March and May 1950.

== Early life ==
Heferen was born in Coonabarabran, New South Wales. He was the son of a farmer, and after an elementary education at Moree Superior Public School worked as butcher's boy and shearer. He was a foreman with the New South Wales Government Railways between 1922 and 1926. Heferen became a wheat farmer after buying land on the Boggabilla-Camurra Railway line at Croppa Creek near Moree. He was active in local community organizations including the Aboriginal Protection Board, the Wheat Growers Association and the Farmers and Settlers Association.

== State parliament ==
Heferen's was elected to the New South Wales Parliament as the Labor member for the seat of Barwon at the 1940 by-election caused by the resignation of the incumbent Country Party member, Ben Wade, who unsuccessfully contested the federal seat of Gwydir at the 1940 election. Heferen's success in a usually safe Country party seat presaged Labor's strong showing in rural electorates at the general election held the next year. The rural successes of Labor at that election enabled the party to return to government under William McKell after a 9-year period in opposition. Heferen retained Barwon at the next 3 elections with diminishing success. At the 1947 election he defeated the Country party's Geoff Crawford by 42 votes (0.15%). He did not hold party, parliamentary or ministerial office.

== Resignation from the Labor Party ==
In November 1949, Eli Harrison resigned from the Legislative Council to successfully contest the federal seat of Blaxland at the 1949 election. His successor was due to be elected at a joint sitting of the two houses of parliament on 22 March 1950. Although the election was by secret ballot, each Labor member of parliament had a unique how-to-vote card, so Labor scrutineers were able to determine if a member had broken caucus solidarity and voted against the endorsed Labor candidate.

On the day of the election, Asher Joel, a wealthy Sydney businessman, was a surprise nomination against Labor's James Thom. Joel was unsuccessful but received 23 votes. It became common knowledge within the Labor Party, although never officially stated, that four members of the party had voted for Joel: Heferen, John Seiffert (Monaro), Fred Stanley (Lakemba) and James Geraghty (North Sydney). There were also unproven rumours that the four had received cash payments for their votes.

The state executive of the Labor Party responded by withholding the party's endorsement of the four members at the 1950 election. However, Heferen and the other disendorsed members received support from the Caucus, and a severe rift developed between the parliamentary and extra-parliamentary parties, which was a major contributor to Labor's poor showing at the 1950 election. Heferen spent the rest of his term as an Independent Labor member. He contested the election as an Independent Labor candidate, and was defeated by Geoff Crawford. Heferen then retired from public life.

New South Wales Legislative Assembly
Preceded by Ben Wade	Member for Barwon; 1940 – 1950	Succeeded by Geoff Crawford
