= Ben Wade (politician) =

Australian politician

Benjamin Martin Wade (12 July 1883 – 20 December 1958) was an Australian politician.

Born at Tenterden to grazier William Martin Wade and Ann Hogan, he attended school at Tenterden and Inverell before finding work at the Lands Department in Narrabri. He married Bertha Matilda Oberle on 17 April 1917, with whom he had three children; she died in 1923. He remarried Claire Vaughan Reece, née Williams, on 10 January 1927, with whom he also had three children; she died on 26 March 1952 in Rome. His final marriage was to Lillian May Sanderson on 21 May 1953. After resigning from the Lands Department to teach at Inverell, Wade travelled to Sydney and entered the building trade, establishing his own Inverell business in 1905. He became a local grazier, and was an alderman at Inverell from 1921 to 1923, 1948 to 1952 and 1953 to 1958 (serving as mayor 1956–58). He was also a member of North West County Council (1949–51, 1954–58).

In 1932, Wade was elected to the New South Wales Legislative Assembly as the Country Party member for Barwon. He held the seat until 1940. Wade died at Inverell in 1958.

New South Wales Legislative Assembly
Preceded by Bill Ratcliffe	Member for Barwon; 1932–1940	Succeeded by Roy Heferen
