= Amanda Fazio =

Australian politician

The Honourable Amanda Fazio

President of the New South Wales Legislative Council
- In office 24 November 2009 – 3 May 2011
- Preceded by: Peter Primrose
- Succeeded by: Don Harwin

Deputy President and Chair of Committees
- In office 30 April 2003 – 24 November 2009
- Preceded by: Tony Kelly
- Succeeded by: Kayee Griffin

Member of Legislative Council of New South Wales
- In office 30 August 2000 – 6 March 2015

Personal details
- Born: 23 August 1954 (age 72) New South Wales
- Party: Labor 2000–2015

Amanda Ruth Fazio (born 23 August 1954) is an Australian politician; she was a member of the New South Wales Legislative Council representing the Labor Party from 2000 to 2015. Fazio was President of the Legislative Council from 24 November 2009 to 3 May 2011, and was opposition whip in the council from 3 May 2011 to 6 March 2015.

== Early years and background ==
Fazio was born to Vince and Ruth Fazio, and grew up in Cabramatta, Nowra and Taree. Educated at Taree Primary School and Cabramatta West Primary School, she later attended Cabramatta High School and then attended the MLC School at Burwood before becoming a Commonwealth public servant. Fazio joined the Australian Labor Party in February 1977 at the Enfield branch and worked for Australian federal politicians Leo McLeay and Stephen Martin.

== Political career ==
Fazio was preselected to fill the vacancy in the Legislative Council in July 2000 caused by the resignation of Jeff Shaw, and was appointed a Member of the council on 30 August 2000. She was re-elected at the 2007 state election from the seventh place on the Labor Party ticket.

Between 2003 and 2009, Fazio served as Deputy President and Chair of Committees and on a number of Council committees before being elected as President of the Legislative Council on 24 November 2009.

On 20 October 2010, Fazio was suspended from the Labor Party when she crossed the floor to vote with the NSW Greens on a bill dealing with the distribution of X-rated pornography. Her suspension was lifted in late March 2011.

Fazio retired from the Legislative Council at the 2015 election.

New South Wales Legislative Council
Preceded by Tony Kelly	Deputy President and Chair of Committees; 2003–2009	Succeeded by Kayee Griffin
Preceded by Peter Primrose	President; 2009–2011	Succeeded by Don Harwin
