= Game Council New South Wales =

Statutory authority in New South Wales, Australia

Statutory authority overview
- Formed: 2002
- Dissolved: 4 July 2013
- Superseding Statutory authority: NSW Game Board
- Jurisdiction: New South Wales
- Minister responsible: Katrina Hodgkinson, Minister for Primary Industries
- Statutory authority executive: Brian Boyle, Chief Executive
- Parent department: Department of Primary Industries
- Key document: Game and Feral Animal Control Act 2002
- Website: www.gamecouncil.nsw.gov.au

Game Council New South Wales was a statutory authority of the Government of New South Wales established in 2002 pursuant to the Game and Feral Animal Control Act 2002 ('the Act'), subject to the control and direction of the Minister for Primary Industries. The Game Council was established as a result of legislative pressure exerted by the Shooters Party, when it held the balance of power in the Legislative Council of New South Wales. Shooter's MP Robert Brown was instrumental in the formation of the legislation.

On 4 July 2013 the Minister for Primary Industries announced the dissolution of the statutory authority following a review of governance of the council by the NSW Government.

However, the review of governance, completed by retired public servant, Steve Dunn, found that:

"more than a decade after it was established the Game Council has no overarching governance framework; lacks a strategic planning framework; lacks some of the skills, tools and resources to ensure effective compliance with its regulatory framework; has no internal regulatory compliance program, has no approved enterprise-wide risk management framework and has an inadequate policy framework".

Immediately after releasing the recommendations of the review, the government announced the abolition of the Game Council; replaced by an appointed advisory body, the New South Wales Game Board; and the regulatory aspect of the Council transferred to the Department of Primary Industries.

== Functions and scope ==
The aim of the Game Council was to provide for the effective management of introduced species of game animals, as well as promoting responsible and orderly hunting of those game animals on public and private land and of certain pest animals on public land.

The Act specified a range of functions for the Game Council centred on administering the game hunting licensing system, representing the interests of game hunters, making recommendations and providing advice to the Minister on game and feral animal control, liaising with other stakeholders in managing game and feral animals, promoting and funding research into game and feral animal control issues and engaging in such other activities relating to the objects of the Act as are prescribed by the regulations.

An annual Public Benefit Assessment was conducted, based on survey data from licence holders, that reported the Game Council's activities as a community service and as a cost-effective method of achieving its natural resource management objectives, specifically game and feral animal control. In 2009–10, there was an increase in public benefit reported.

== Controversies ==
In May 2012, supported by the Game Council, the NSW Government announced plans to allow pest control by licensed individuals to help control pest animals in selected national parks, nature reserves and state conservation areas. The Game Council was to play a role as both the licensing agency and as the regulating agency. The proposal generated significant community resistance, and was subjected to a campaign from its opponents in an environment where a group of hunters were shooting at kangaroos in a national park camping ground – an illegal act – and the hunting of native animals close to metropolitan areas,

In January 2013 it was reported that two of the staff of the Game Council, including the council's communications manager and acting chief executive, Greg McFarland, were suspended from work by the Minister as police investigated allegations that McFarland hunted on private property near Cobar without permission, in a Game Council-owned vehicle. Police charged McFarland with a raft of offences including hunting without permission, possessing a prohibited weapon in a nature reserve and firing a firearm onto enclosed lands. The other staff member was found to have been in Sydney at the time of the incident and was exonerated by police.

At the same time, the government commissioned a review of the governance of the Game Council; that ultimately led to its abolition.
