= Shooters, Fishers and Farmers Party =

- Abbreviation: SFF; SFFP
- Founder: John Tingle
- Founded: 2 May 1992; 34 years ago
- Headquarters: Sydney, New South Wales, Australia
- Ideology: Conservatism
- Political position: Right-wing
- Tasmanian House of Assembly: 1 / 35
- New South Wales Legislative Council: 2 / 42
- Victorian Legislative Council: 1 / 40
- Local government councillors (NSW): 4 / 1,480

Website
- shootersfishersandfarmers.org.au

Seats in local government
- Dubbo: 2 / 11
- Junee: 1 / 9
- Hawkesbury: 1 / 12

The Shooters, Fishers and Farmers Party (SFF) is a conservative Australian political party. It primarily advocates for increased funding and services for rural and regional Australia, protecting the right to farm, enhancing commercial and recreational fishing, and relaxing gun control for citizens.

The party was formed in 1992, and was known simply as the Shooters Party. It initially operated only in New South Wales, but has since expanded into other states. It was registered with the Australian Electoral Commission (AEC) in 2007, and contested its first federal election the same year. In July 2009, the party changed its name to the Shooters and Fishers Party, and in April 2016, the name was again changed to its current name. The party has also gradually broadened its policy focus, with water and regional health care being its main focus during the 2019 NSW state and federal election campaigns.

The Shooters, Fishers and Farmers Party currently has two members in the New South Wales Legislative Council and one in the Tasmanian House of Assembly and Victorian Legislative Council. It has previously elected members to the New South Wales Legislative Assembly and the Western Australian Legislative Council.

In November 2016, the party won its first lower house seat in NSW, winning the seat of Orange in a by-election; subsequently increased to three seats following the 2019 New South Wales state election. However, in 2022 all three NSW Legislative Assembly members of parliament left the party to sit as independents.

== History ==
The Shooters Party was formed on 2 May 1992 by journalist and broadcaster John Tingle after the New South Wales Government proposed to tighten gun control laws after a number of Australian mass shootings. Tingle claimed the new laws would prevent citizens from owning firearms for self-defence. Tingle was elected to the New South Wales Legislative Council at the 1995 NSW election in March 1995 for an eight-year term, the party's first representative.

After the National Firearms Agreement came into force, Tingle and the Shooters Party encouraged and helped organise the formation of hunting clubs in many parts of New South Wales, and in November 1996 formed them into the Federation of Hunting Clubs. The Federation is a recognised umbrella group under the Firearms Regulations, and the Firearms Act 1996 (NSW) was amended to recognise membership of a hunting club as a "genuine reason" for a firearm licence. About 90% of all firearms licences were taken out for the purpose of hunting. In the Federation's returns with the Australian Electoral Commission since 2008/09, the Federation indicates that it is an associated entity of the Shooters and Fishers Party. The Federation and the Shooters and Fishers Party share the same address, and most of the income of the Federation (about $30,000 in 2014/15) is donated to the Shooters and Fishers Party. The Hunter District Hunting Club donated a further $42,000 to the party in 2014/15. The total receipts of the party in that year were $148,256.

Tingle was elected to a second term at the 2003 NSW election. In 2005, Tingle claimed that the Sporting Shooters Association of Australia had joined forces with the Shooters Party, with Brown being a life member of the Association. At the time, the association had more than 35,000 (now has 175,000+) members and the other mainstay of the shooting fraternity, the Federation of Hunting Clubs, had more than 50,000 members. It was the basis of the powerful gun lobby group. Tingle in the Legislative Council served until 3 May 2006 when he, at the age of 74, resigned from Parliament before, allegedly due to illness believed to be cancer.

Robert Brown, the party's chairman since 2005, was nominated by the party to fill the casual vacancy for the remainder of Tingle's term which ended in 2011. Brown was re-elected at the 2011 NSW election for an eight-year term. In 2013 Tingle resigned his position as vice chairman of the party and has relinquished his membership of the party.

For the 2013 federal election, the Shooters and Fishers Party was involved in the Minor Party Alliance and its organiser, Glenn Druery, was on its payroll. The so-called alliance arranged a preference deal among the minor parties which enabled candidates with very small primary votes to win seats in the Senate. At the 2013 election the party obtained about 1% of the national Senate vote.

In 2016, the party added "Farmers" to the party title, with the name change formally registered on 12 April 2016. The party has since adopted a much broader agenda, developing policies in areas such as water management; regional health care; education; mining and energy; local government and policing.

From the 2011–2018 period, the party has received approximately $700,000 in political donations from pro-gun groups.

== Policies ==
=== Water management ===
In the 2019 NSW state election, the SFF Party campaigned strongly on the need to change policies and management around the Murray Darling Basin (MDB). This followed a water crisis across NSW, where several towns were left without safe drinking water, millions of fish were killed in the Menindee Lakes and there were widespread allegations of water theft, government mismanagement and corruption.

SFF release a ten-point plan on water management, following consultation with farmers, water experts and regional communities. The plan called for:

- Full standardised metering and inspections across the MDB – a "no meter, no pump" rule for water extraction.
- An audit, measure and evaluate environmental water – management of environmental water must be centralised in the one entity, and the water kept for environmental purposes only (not sold or swapped). The costs and benefits of environmental flows must be analysed and reported on.
- A federal royal commission into water mismanagement and a five-year pause of the Murray Darling Basin Plan (MDBP).

SFF argued a federal royal commission was needed to evaluate the flawed science, weak regulation and selective data undermining the MDBP; and flush out the corruption.

=== Firearms ===
The party's policies were initially entirely focused around firearms, asserting that every law-abiding citizen should have the right to own and use a firearm for legitimate purposes, including self-defence, a position that remains relatively unchanged but broadened in that they now advocate for the tougher sentencing for illegal gun use and do not condone "American style gun laws". In broadening the appeal the party now strongly supports recreational and conservation hunting, and laws giving shooters access to public land for hunting in a controlled ecological manner.

The Party counts among its achievements a number of successful Bills in New South Wales. These include those giving rights of self-defence to any citizen, anywhere, with immunity from civil or criminal liability; providing extra penalties for attacks on vulnerable people; giving families of homicide victims the right to be heard in court; establishment of the Game Council New South Wales now disbanded, and legislation allowing specifically licensed hunters to hunt on public land; government funding controlled by the party for shooting clubs, and the establishment and control of regional shooting complexes; recognition of membership of a hunting club as "genuine reason" for obtaining a firearms licence; and extension of minor permits from ages 12 to 18.

In 2019 NSW leader Robert Borsak stated that the party had no policies to weaken gun laws in NSW; although he called for a review of the functions and financing of NSW Firearms Registry.

=== Other policies ===
The leader of the NSW SFF, Robert Borsak, promotes climate change denialism, stating that "scientific research, reports and arguments supporting human blame for climate change, were wrong".

In New South Wales, following the 2019 state election the party outlined its agenda that included calls for a NSW royal commission into water management, a "right to farm bill" to protect farmers against animal rights activists, and opposition to the Murray-Darling Basin plan, forced council mergers, and lockout laws in Sydney.

In Victoria, the party opposes the creation of the proposed Great Forest National Park in central Victoria, while their Victorian MP Jeff Bourman unsuccessfully attempted to relax restrictions on gun silencers for licensed hunters.

== Political activities ==
=== Federal politics ===
Before the 2004 federal election, the Australian Shooters Party was deregistered by the Australian Electoral Commission for failing to contest a federal election for four years. It was re-registered after the 2004 federal election but was deregistered again on 27 December 2006, along with a number of minor parties which did not have a representative sitting in Federal Parliament. Re-registration was achieved in August 2007. The Australian Shooters Party contested the 2007 federal election and received 0.28% of the national vote and 1.1% of the vote in NSW. The Party was instrumental in flowing preferences away from the Greens in NSW, Queensland and Victoria.

Glenn Druery who was behind the 2013 federal election preference deal successes with candidate elections on 0.2 and 0.5 percent was remunerated by the Shooters and Fishers Party for assisting in organising preference meetings and negotiating preference flows between parties. The party has been involved in Druery's Minor Party Alliance.

In May 2018, it was reported that Senator Brian Burston of One Nation had attempted to defect to the Shooters, Fishers and Farmers Party; he would have been the party's first federal representative. Robert Borsak, the party's leader in New South Wales, said that "I don't think he'd be a good representative for us [...] we're not that desperate for a Canberra representative at the moment and when we do, we'll use our own people." However, Burston subsequently stated: "The claim that I have approached the Shooters Party is totally and absolutely false".

=== New South Wales ===
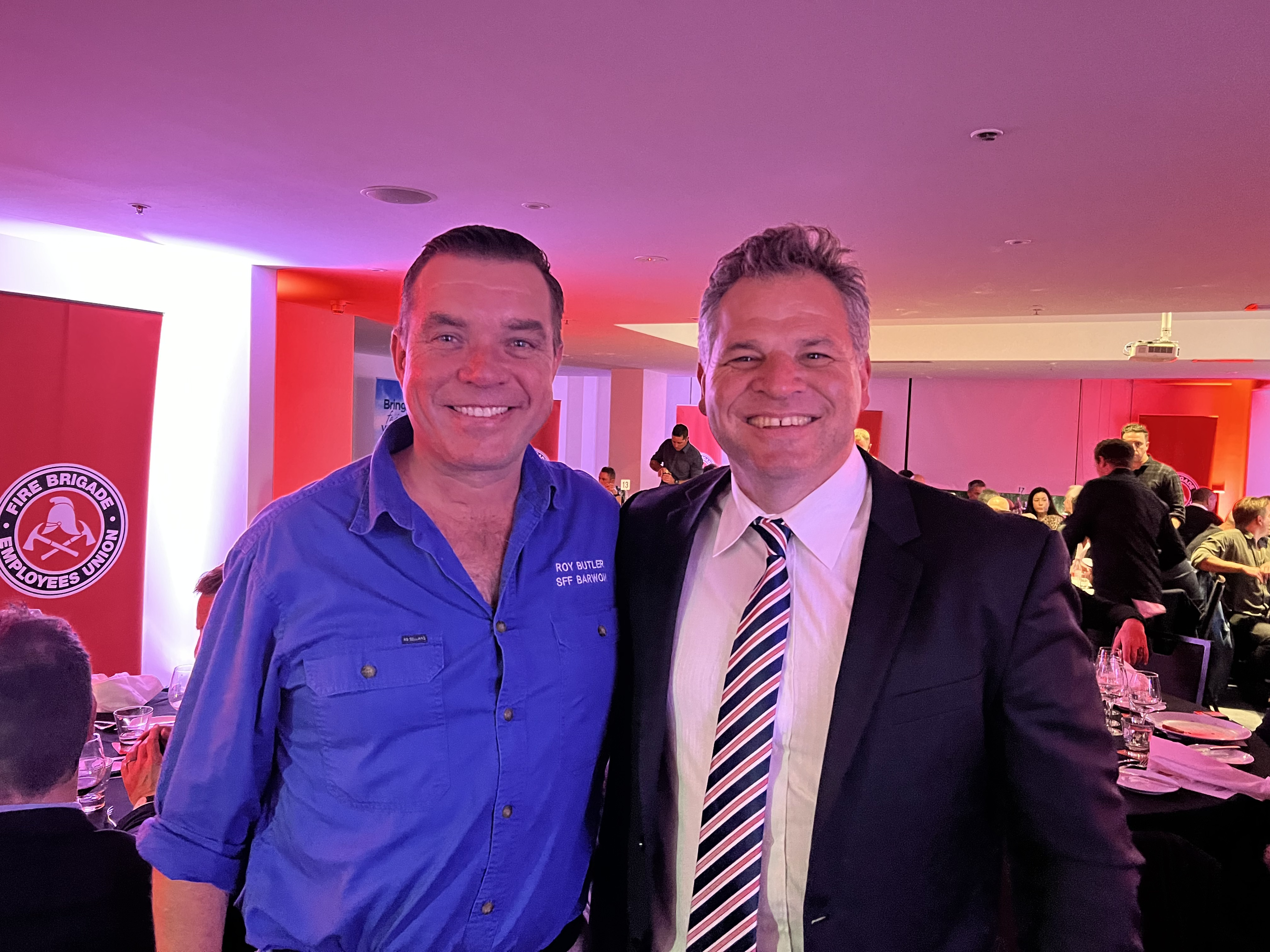
New South Wales MLAs Roy Butler (left) and Philip Donato at the 2022 Fire Brigade Employees' Union conference, prior to their resignation from the party

At the 2007 New South Wales state election, the Shooters Party received 2.8% of the primary vote for the Legislative Council (↑0.8%) and lead candidate Roy Smith was elected to the Legislative Council. On 30 July 2010, Smith died in his sleep and Robert Borsak was nominated by the party to fill the casual vacancy. As a result, the party holds 2 seats in the NSW Upper House. In 2009 an agreement was reached to allow hunters onto public lands in a deal with the government.

At the 2011 New South Wales state election, the Liberal/National Coalition took government but with three seats short of a majority in the upper house. The Shooters and Fishers Party held two seats along with the Christian Democratic Party, with the balance of power shifting from the Greens to the two parties. The Shooters and Fishers Party was reported to have created a "shopping list" of demands in exchange for legislative support of the now Liberal/National government, however the government "ruled out" any deals with the Shooters.

In May 2012 the party negotiated a deal with the O'Farrell government giving recreational shooters access to national parks to cull feral animals including pigs, rabbits and deer by allowing the passage of laws through the NSW Upper House to sell the state-owned power generating assets of Eraring Energy, Delta Electricity and Macquarie Generation, that were claimed to yield up to A$3 billion. Deals continue to have fallout.

At the state by-election for Orange on 12 November 2016, Shooters, Fishers and Farmers candidate Philip Donato became the party's first lower house member, defeating the incumbent National Party for the seat in the Legislative Assembly.

In the 2019 New South Wales state election, the party made breakthroughs in the state's lower house, with candidates Roy Butler and Helen Dalton winning the seats of Barwon and Murray respectively. On 3 March 2022, Dalton resigned from Shooters Fishers and Farmers due to disagreeing with the party's Legislative Council members not showing up to vote against a bill regarding water usage that she believed would "disadvantage communities and irrigators in the lower Darling and Murray river system". On 12 December 2022, Butler and Donato resigned over the behaviour of leader Robert Borsak.

=== Northern Territory ===
The SFF Party has very little presence in the Northern Territory, but a Northern Territory branch of the party does exist.

At the 2016 general election, the party ran candidates in two rural seats: Katherine and Nelson.

At the 2016 federal election, the party contested both the remote seat of Lingiari and the metropolitan seat of Solomon. The party preferenced the incumbent members for their respect seats behind the other major party on their how-to-vote cards, thus preferencing the Country Liberal Party (CLP) ahead of Labor in Lingiari and Labor ahead of the CLP in Solomon, and the parts preferenced the Greens last in both seats.

In the Northern Territory, the party's voter base absorbs a plurality of voters who vote for Pauline Hanson's One Nation on the federal level, as One Nation does not contest Northern Territory general elections.

=== South Australia ===
At the 2006 South Australian state election, two Shooters Party candidates for the Legislative Council, Robert Low and Michael Hudson, preferenced the Family First Party as well as the One Nation Party. The Shooters Party received just under 6,000 votes, or 0.6% of the electors, with a 0.08 quota. Neither candidate was elected. The party also contested the 2010 (as Shooters) and 2014 (as Shooters and Fishers) elections, increasing the number of votes in each but not enough to achieve a quota. It was deregistered before the 2018 election.

=== Victoria ===
At the 2014 Victorian state election, two Shooters and Fishers candidates were elected to the Legislative Council: Jeff Bourman received 2.44% first preference votes in the Eastern Victoria Region and was elected on preferences from the other minor parties, and Daniel Young received 3.5% first preference votes in the Northern Victoria Region and was also elected on preferences. Bourman was re-elected in 2018, while Young was defeated.

Bourman was re-elected in 2022.

=== Western Australia ===
The logo of the party's Western Australian branch

At the 2013 Western Australian state election, Shooters and Fishers candidate Rick Mazza was elected to the Legislative Council with 3.09% of the vote in the Agricultural Region. Nigel Hallett was elected for the Liberal Party in South West Region, but changed to the Shooters, Fishers, and Farmers in June 2016. Mazza retained his seat at the 2017 election, but Hallett did not. Mazza subsequently formed a 'conservative bloc' with One Nation and the Liberal Democratic Party in the Legislative Council.

=== Tasmania ===
At the 2025 Tasmanian state election, Carlo Di Falco was elected as the seventh member for the electorate of Lyons in the Tasmanian House of Assembly. Di Falco is the first member of the SFF to be elected into Tasmanian state parliament. Subsequently key party figures quit over Di Falco's change of stance on a new Hobart stadium project.

== State and territory divisions ==
The current Shooters, Fishers and Farmers Party divisions are the following:

Division	Leader	Legislative Assembly	Legislative Council	Status
Shooters, Fishers and Farmers Party (NSW)	Robert Borsak	0 / 93	2 / 42	Crossbench
Shooters, Fishers and Farmers Party (Victoria)	Jeff Bourman	0 / 88	1 / 40	Crossbench
Shooters, Fishers and Farmers Party (WA)	Rick Mazza	0 / 59	0 / 36	Extra-parliamentary
Shooters, Fishers and Farmers Party (QLD)		0 / 93	None	Extra-parliamentary
Shooters, Fishers and Farmers Party (Tasmania)	Wayne Turale	1 / 34	0 / 15	Crossbench
Shooters, Fishers and Farmers Party (ACT)		0 / 25	None	Extra-parliamentary
Shooters and Fishers Party (NT)		0 / 25	None	Extra-parliamentary

== Election results ==
=== Federal ===
Senate
Election year	# of overall votes	% of overall vote	# of overall seats	+/–	Name of party (at time of poll)
1993	63,691	0.60	0 / 76	0	Shooters Party
1996	114,724	1.05	0 / 76	0	Shooters Party
1996	38,188	0.34	0 / 76	0	Australian Shooters Party
2007	84,148	0.66	0 / 76	0	Australian Shooters Party (Vic, QLD, SA); Shooters / Fishing and Lifestyle (NSW)
2010	214,119	1.68	0 / 76	0	Shooters and Fishers
2013	127,397	0.95	0 / 76	0	Shooters and Fishers
2016	192,965	1.39	0 / 76	0	Shooters, Fishers, and Farmers
2019	253,267	1.73	0 / 76	0	Shooters, Fishers, and Farmers
2022	147,737	0.98	0 / 76	0	Shooters, Fishers, and Farmers
2025	59,434	0.37	0 / 76	0	Shooters, Fishers, and Farmers

=== New South Wales ===
Election year	Legislative Assembly				Legislative Council				
Election year	# votes	% votes	# seats	+/–	# votes	% votes	# seats	# overall seats	+/–
1995	-	-	0 / 99	0	95,943	2.84	1 / 21	1 / 42	▲1
1999	-	-	0 / 93	0	59,295	1.67	0 / 21	1 / 42	0
2003	-	-	0 / 93	0	76,133	2.05	1 / 21	1 / 42	0
2007	-	-	0 / 93	0	106,513	2.79	1 / 21	2 / 42	▲1
2011	2,346	0.06	0 / 93	0	150,741	3.70	1 / 21	2 / 42	0
2015	-	-	0 / 93	0	167,871	3.89	1 / 21	2 / 42	0
2019	157,636	3.46	3 / 93	▲3	246,477	5.54	1 / 21	2 / 42	0
2023	73,359	1.53	0 / 93	▼3	144,043	3.06	1 / 21	2 / 42	0

=== Victoria ===
Election year	Legislative Assembly				Legislative Council				
Election year	# votes	% votes	# seats	+/–	# votes	% votes	# seats	# overall seats	+/–
2014	2,622	0.08	0 / 88	▲0	56,536	1.65	2 / 40	2 / 40	▲2
2018	24,257	0.69	0 / 88	▲0	108,280	3.02	1 / 40	1 / 40	▼1
2022	11,590	0.32	0 / 88	▼0	76,742	2.05	1 / 40	1 / 40	▼1

=== Tasmania ===
Election year	House of Assembly			
Election year	# votes	% votes	# seats	+/–
2018	7,640	2.88	0 / 25	0
2021	10,369	3.04	0 / 25	0
2024	8,126	2.33	0 / 35	0
2025	10,263	2.29	1 / 35	▲1

=== Western Australia ===
Election year	Legislative Assembly				Legislative Council				
Election year	# votes	% votes	# seats	+/–	# votes	% votes	# seats	# overall seats	+/–
2013	-	-	0 / 59	0	21,765	1.78	1 / 36	1 / 36	▲1
2017	17,317	1.31	0 / 59	0	31,924	2.37	1 / 36	1 / 36	0
2021	9,669	0.69	0 / 59	0	21,210	1.47	0 / 36	0 / 36	▼1

== Political representatives ==
=== Current members of parliament ===
==== New South Wales ====
===== Legislative Council =====
- Robert Borsak MLC, 2010–present
- Mark Banasiak MLC, 2019–present

==== Victoria ====
- Jeff Bourman – Member for Eastern Victoria Region in the Victorian Legislative Council, 2014–present

Tasmania

- Carlo Di Falco – Member for Lyons, 2025–present

=== Past members of parliament ===
New South Wales

- Roy Smith – New South Wales Legislative Council, 2007–2010
- John Tingle – New South Wales Legislative Council, 1995–2006
- Robert Brown – New South Wales Legislative Council, 2006–2019
- Helen Dalton, Member for Murray, 2019–2022
- Roy Butler, Member for Barwon, 2019–2022
- Philip Donato, Member for Orange, 2016–2022

Victoria

- Daniel Young – Victorian Legislative Council, 2014–2018

Western Australia

- Nigel Hallett – Western Australian Legislative Council, 2016–2017
- Rick Mazza – Western Australian Legislative Council, 2013–2021

== See also ==
- List of political parties in Australia
- Gun laws in Australia
