= Hassall (surname) =

Hassall is a surname. Notable people with the surname include:

- Arthur Hill Hassall (1817–1894), British physician, chemist and microscopist
- Cedric Hassall, New Zealand chemist
- Charlie Hassall (1863–?), English footballer
- Christopher Hassall (1912–1963), English actor, dramatist, librettist, lyricist and poet
- Eliza Marsden Hassall (1834–1917), Australian philanthropist
- Harold Hassall (1929–2015), English footballer
- Ian Hassall, New Zealand paediatrician
- Imogen Hassall (1942–1980), English actress
- Joan Hassall (1906–1988), English wood engraver and illustrator
- Joe Hassall (1871–1895), English footballer
- John Hassall (disambiguation), multiple people
- Jon Hassall (born 1973), Australian rules footballer
- Nanette Hassall (born 1947), Australian dancer and choreographer
- Rowland Hassall (1768-1820), Early Australian settler, missionary
- Thomas Hassall (1840–1920), Australian politician
- Thomas Hassall (priest) (1794-1868), Australian clergyman
