= Ernie Awards =

Australian awards for misogyny

- Awarded for: For comments deemed misogynistic
- Venue: NSW Parliament House
- Reward: The Gold Ernie
- First award: 1993

Highlights
- Most wins: Male: Tony Abbott (15); Fem: Bettina Arndt (5)
- Website: http://ernies.com.au/

The Ernie Awards, or the Ernies, were Australian awards for comments deemed misogynistic. They were held annually from 1993 to 2022, being discontinued after that year.

== History ==
They are named after former Australian Workers' Union secretary Ernie Ecob, who was known for his misogynistic remarks. One of his best-known remarks was "Women aren't welcome in the shearing sheds. They're only after the sex", which is why there is a sheep on top of the Gold Ernie. The inaugural awards night was in celebration of his resignation from the Labor Council of New South Wales.

== Description ==
A dinner is held for 300 women each year and the winner is determined by the person who receives the most booing when their sexist statement or action is read out.

A variety of categories have featured, such as the Gold Ernie, the Warney (for sport, named after Shane Warne), the Media Ernie, the Political Ernie, the Judicial Ernie, the Good Ernie (for boys behaving better, formerly called the Gareth after Gareth Evans), the Elaine (for females making comments unhelpful to the sisterhood, named after Elaine Nile) and the Trump (for repeat offenders, after Donald Trump). The categories of offenders have changed over the years.

A collection of comments has been compiled in the book One Thousand Terrible Things Australian Men Have Said About Women by Meredith Burgmann and Yvette Andrews.

== Winners ==
=== Gold Ernie ===
- 1993: Joe de Bruyn, National Secretary, Shop, Distributive and Allied Employees Association: "All childcare subsidies should be removed and reallocated to women who stayed home to mind their children."
- 1994: Terry Griffiths, former New South Wales Liberal minister (in response to allegations of sexually harassing his staff): "I honestly believe that my personal behaviour was in a family mode. They're like my own kids. I'm a toucher... I have a habit of touching people in that regard. I'm old fashioned."
- 1995: Justice John Gallop, Australian Capital Territory Supreme Court (upon imposing a bond upon a man convicted of raping a 12-year-old girl): "Our jails would be full if we locked up everyone who did this."
- 1996: Magistrate Ron Gething, Magistrates Court of Western Australia (upon finding a man not guilty of stalking a woman for seven years): "I don't think he was intimidating her, he was just being persistent. He was like a little puppy dog wagging its tail."
- 1997: Michael Knight, New South Wales state Minister for the Olympics (on why there were originally no women on the board of the Sydney Organising Committee for the Olympic Games): "Appointments are made on merit, not sex."
- 1998: Judge Nigel Clarke, District Court of Western Australia (upon giving a two-year suspended sentence to a man for sexually abusing his daughter): "Indulgence is a pleasurable, curiosity-satisfying activity by an intelligent precocious girl."
- 1999: "Magistrate #1" (in a case reviewed by the Judicial Commission): "Women cause a lot of problems by nagging, bitching and emotionally hurting men. Men cannot bitch back for hormonal reasons, and often have no recourse but violence."
- 2000: Nick Bideau, ex-coach and partner of Cathy Freeman: "I never turned away from Cathy... no matter how fat she was in 1997, and even in 1998."
- 2001: John Howard, Prime Minister: for saying that there was "no appropriate woman" for Governor-General.
- 2002: Archbishop George Pell, Catholic Archbishop of Sydney: "Abortion is a worse moral scandal than priests sexually abusing young people."
- 2003: Stellar Call Centre: for docking the pay of a pregnant woman for taking too many toilet breaks.
- 2004: Tooheys: for an advertisement stating "Boys, if you win you can have our sisters".
- 2005: Sheikh Feiz Mohammad, Islamic cleric: "A victim of rape every minute somewhere in the world. Why? No one to blame but herself. She displayed her beauty to the entire world...strapless, backless, sleeveless, nothing but satanic skirts, slit skirts, translucent blouses, miniskirts, tight jeans...to tease man and appeal to his carnal nature."
- 2006: P&O Cruises: for the advertising slogans "More Girls. More Sun. More Fun. There's nothing else a guy needs to know!" and "Seamen Wanted!"
- 2007: Bill Heffernan. New South Wales Liberal Senator: for saying that Julia Gillard was not qualified to lead the country because she is "deliberately barren", and later justifying it with "I won't walk away from that... so rude, crude and attractive as it was... if you're a leader, you've got to understand your community."
- 2008: John Molony: for calling on "beauty-disadvantaged women" to consider moving to the remote Australian mining town of Mount Isa in north-west Queensland where he is mayor. When local women retaliated he replied they were blaming him for his looks.
- 2009: Pastor Danny Nalliah: for blaming the Black Saturday bushfires on Victoria's abortion laws.
- 2010: Students of St. Paul's College, Sydney: for their "Define Statutory" group on Facebook.
- 2011: Herald Sun journalist Andrew Bolt: for saying: "Can the ADF afford this social engineering, in which gender becomes a qualification - and a fault line? What will this do to the tight mate-ship so critical to a fighting unit? Does a woman turn her male colleagues from warriors to escort?"
- 2012: 2GB radio broadcaster Alan Jones: for saying "Women are destroying the joint, Christine Nixon in Melbourne, Clover Moore here, honestly there is no chaff bag big enough for these people."
- 2013: Wesley College, University of Sydney students for distributing stubby holders bearing the words "It's not rape if it's my birthday."
- 2014: Christopher Pyne, for claiming that increases in uni fees won't disproportionately affect women because "women are well-represented amongst the teaching and nursing students. They will not be able to earn the high incomes that dentists and lawyers will earn".
- 2015: Football Federation Australia, for paying the Matildas an annual salary of $21,000 per year, which is below the minimum wage. The women receive $500 for each international game, while their male counterparts in the Socceroos receive $6,000.
- 2016: Barrister Ben Mallick, for defending a taxi driver accused of sexual assault saying, "the attack would not have happened if the woman had sat in the back seat" and the NSW Department of Education, for its policy that experienced teachers who take five years off to raise children should return to work on a graduate salary.
- 2017: Port Stephens mayor Bruce MacKenzie, for pleading guilty to assaulting his partner but still wanting a domestic violence shelter to be named after him.
- 2018: Cricket Australia for sacking a female employee, Angela Williamson after she campaigned for abortion reform on social media.
- 2019: Alan Jones for his on-air comments hoping Scott Morrison would get, "tough here with a few backhanders... She’s a clown, Jacinda Ardern… I just wonder whether Scott Morrison is going to be fully briefed to shove a sock down her throat".
- 2020: Jayson Westbury from the Australian Federation of Travel Agents (AFTA), for his attack on Tracy Grimshaw.
- 2021: Senator Eric Abetz for comments allegedly made to Sue Hickey, Speaker of the Tasmanian House of Assembly. In March 2020, Hickey told the Tasmanian parliament that Abetz had commented on a rape allegation against Federal Attorney-General Christian Porter by saying "not to worry, the woman is dead and the law will protect him", and then, referring to the alleged rape of Liberal Party junior staffer Brittany Higgins by an unnamed colleague, "as for that Higgins girl, anybody who is so disgustingly drunk who would sleep with anybody, could have slept with one of our spies and put the security of our nation at risk". Abetz denies making these remarks.
- 2022: Journalist Paul Kelly, for declaring that "the women's movement won't decide the next election".

=== Silver Ernie – Industrial ===
- 1994: Lance Jamieson, union official: for using his union-provided credit card at Sydney brothel A Touch of Class.
- 1995: Martin Ferguson, then president of the Australian Council of Trade Unions, formerly Labor Minister for Resources, Energy and Tourism: for calling women unionists campaigning for paid maternity leave "hairy legged femocrats"; AWU-FIMEE union for offering members discounts for hiring striptease artists.
- 1996: Law Society of New South Wales
- 1997: Telstra
- 1998: HPM Industries: for sacking 20 male employees whose pay was being compared to their women coworkers on the eve of Industrial Relations Commission hearings on the matter.
- 1999: Steggles: for putting a woman on a roster she could not do because of her family, and opposing her case in court.
- 2000: Michael Costa
- 2001: John Elliott and Mark Mentha
- 2002: Dick Warburton
- 2003: Stellar Call Centre: for docking a pregnant woman $100 for going to the toilet too often.
- 2004: Australia Post: for telling female workers to lose weight if they wanted to attend the opening of a new branch, and for cutting the maternity leave of a woman whose baby was premature.
- 2005: Tara Anglican School for Girls
- 2006: P&O Cruises Australia: for an advertisement saying "Seamen wanted", an ad mentioned in the inquest of Dianne Brimble's death.
- 2007: Inghams: for using a breast awareness week slogan in advertising its chicken breast items.
- 2008: Professor Mark Wooden from the University of Melbourne: for telling a mostly-female audience at a National Press Club discussion "The pay equity gap has got a lot to do with the fact that women are not prepared to work longer hours."
- 2009: NSW Police for forcing an employee to work overtime for every minute she was breastfeeding her baby.
- 2010: Mark McInnes, former CEO of David Jones, and mining executive Clive Palmer.
- 2011: The Australian Defence Force Academy: for charging (on an unrelated matter) the woman who was filmed without her knowledge in the Skype sex scandal.
- 2012: David Farley, CEO of Australian Agricultural Company: for, when demonstrating a machine in an abattoir, stating, "it's designed for non-productive old cows. Julia Gillard's got to watch out."
- 2013: Wesley College, University of Sydney students for distributing stubby holders bearing the words "It's not rape if it's my birthday."
- 2014: Wicked Campers, for including slogans such as "Fat girls are harder to kidnap", "In every princess, there's a little slut who wants to try it just once" and "Life sucks if your girlfriend doesn't".
- 2015: Soho Club, for running an advertisement appearing to carry connotations of sexual assault a week after the owner's son, Luke Lazarus, was convicted of rape.
- 2016: The New South Wales Department of Education, for its policy that experienced teachers who take five years off to raise children should return to work on a graduate salary.
- 2017: Ford Australia, for dismissing complaints on the Ford Focus losing power to an issue with the way women drove.
- 2018: Coopers Hotel Newtown, for the Facebook post "Keep calm and slap a bitch as we approach the finals of this year’s NRL!" and Outsiders, for sacking the only woman who worked on the show after criticism of their airing of David Leyonhjelm's attack on Sarah Hanson-Young.
- 2019: John Setka, for claiming domestic violence activist Rosie Batty had caused men to have fewer rights.
- 2020: Jayson Westbury from the Australian Federation of Travel Agents (AFTA), for his attack on Tracy Grimshaw.
- 2021: General Angus Campbell, Chief of the Defence Force for telling female cadets they could avoid sexual predators by being aware of the "four As: alcohol, out after midnight, alone, and attractive".
- 2022: The Department of the Prime Minister and Cabinet for designing a women's network logo that bared a resemblance to "a large purple cock and balls".

=== Silver Ernie – Political ===
- 1994: Terry Griffiths
- 1995: Michael Hodgman, for criticising the Australian Labor Party's quotas for female MPs with "The mad-as-a-March-hare radical feminists have got the Labor Party firmly by the testicles ... Extreme lesbian elements which have infiltrated the ALP are delighted with their success ... Keating has weakly capitulated to the man-haters."
- 1996: Bob Katter
- 1997: Michael Knight
- 1998: Tony Smith and Iain Maclean
- 1999: Michael Thompson, for saying that "working mothers are the cause of many problems in society" and Queensland Young Liberals.
- 2000: Michael Wooldridge
- 2001: Ron Best for his comment to Industrial Relations Minister Monica Gould "her breasts were so small her front was indistinguishable from her back"; John Howard, Prime Minister: for saying that there was "no appropriate woman" for Governor-General
- 2002: Tony Abbott for saying paid maternity leave would happen over his dead body.
- 2003: Brendan Smyth
- 2004: John Howard, for vetoing an ad campaign against domestic violence, arguing against paid maternity leave, wanting to change the anti-discrimination act, and opposing plans by the ALP to offer the option of permanent part-time work with holiday pay and sick leave entitlements for casual workers.
- 2005: Brendan Nelson
- 2006: Bill Heffernan
- 2007: Bill Heffernan and Joe Hockey
- 2008: Western Australia's treasurer Troy Buswell for snapping the bra of a female Labor staffer, sexist remarks to a Liberal MP and sniffing the chair of a Liberal staffer.
- 2009: Strathfield Councillor Danny Lim, for suggesting local Labor MP Virginia Judge buy a vibrator to "stop screwing with the people of Strathfield and screw herself instead".
- 2010: Tony Abbott
- 2011: Tony Abbott
- 2012: Barry O'Farrell, for, when speaking about Linda Burney, saying, "I am not sure which other member could be the hooker, perhaps the Member for Canterbury".
- 2013: Mal Brough for the Liberal Party dinner menu featuring "Julia Gillard Kentucky Fried Quail - Small Breasts, Huge Thighs and a Big Red Box"
- 2014: Christopher Pyne, for claiming that increases in uni fees won't disproportionately affect women because "women are well-represented amongst the teaching and nursing students. They will not be able to earn the high incomes that dentists and lawyers will earn".
- 2015: Tony Abbott, for saying that his greatest achievement as Minister for Women was the repeal of the carbon tax.
- 2016: Mark Latham, for saying that domestic violence is a "coping mechanism" for men and saying domestic violence campaigner Rosie Batty was "demonising men" and making men who hit women "feel worse about themselves".
- 2017: Port Stephens mayor Bruce MacKenzie, for pleading guilty to assaulting his partner but still wanting a domestic violence shelter to be named after him.
- 2018: Barnaby Joyce, for referring to his daughters during the equal marriage debate, "We know that the best protection for those girls is that they get themselves into a secure relationship with a loving husband, and I want that to happen".
- 2019: Scott Morrison, for his statement on International Women's Day, "It’s not in our values to push some people down to lift some people up. That is true of gender equality. We don’t want to see women rise only on the basis of others doing worse."
- 2020: Malcolm Roberts, for his comments inciting violence against women.
- 2021: shared between Senator Eric Abetz and Prime Minister Scott Morrison. Abetz' win in this category was in recognition of the same remarks for which he won the 2021 Gold Ernie (see above). Morrison's share in the award was for his explanation that he was taking action over Brittany Higgins' rape allegations against one of her colleagues once his wife, Jenny, had asked him to consider how he would view the allegation had it been made by one of their daughters. In February 2021, he had told the press, "Jenny and I spoke last night and she said to me, you have to think about this as a father. What would you want to happen if it were our girls?"
- 2022: Bernie Finn, member of the Victorian Legislative Council, for stating that he knew rape victims who had "never been happier" after having children.

=== Silver Ernie – Media ===
- 1994: Peter Smark and Bernard Zuel
- 1995: Paddy McGuinness, for saying "There are two groups of middle-aged feminists - those who are still striving for an advancement for which few of them are qualified (the sisters in suits) and those who are total failures, and blame it all on men who they think range from patriarchs through to rapists."
- 1996: Jeff Wells
- 1997: John Laws and David Barnett
- 1998: Robert Manne
- 1999: Paddy McGuinness
- 2000: D.D. McNicholl
- 2001: Image consultant Mark Patrick: for saying while a simple sleeveless shirt dress was a must for women, "sleeveless was a bad look, especially for anyone over 30."
- 2002: Andrew Bolt: who attacked the right of single women and lesbians to access IVF treatments and criticised the Sex Discrimination Act because it allowed this.
- 2003: Ron Casey, for saying that Kirstie Marshall's breastfeeding of her infant in parliament was a publicity stunt that managed to get her "boobies splashed all over the national press".
- 2004: Paddy McGuinness for saying that many pro-choice activists have not devoted any serious thought to the issue since the 1970s.
- 2005: Dave Richardson
- 2006: Jeff Corbett: for saying that NASA had a male as well as female engineer on board in case anything went wrong.
- 2008: Nine Network for sacking Christine Spiteri while she was on maternity leave and news chief John Westacott for commenting "Sheilas do health and consumer stories - you want your blokes, your main guns, doing the real news stories."
- 2009: Kyle Sandilands: for the lie detector stunt and for suggesting that comedian Magda Szubanski would lose more weight in a concentration camp.
- 2010: FHM Magazine
- 2011: Andrew Bolt
- 2012: Alan Jones: for saying "Women are destroying the joint, Christine Nixon in Melbourne, Clover Moore here, honestly there is no chaff bag big enough for these people."
- 2013: Paul Sheehan: "The mask fell away" and Gillard came out "snarling, accusing Abbott of having a hatred of women, a man" he said - before his paper deleted it - "who unlike the Prime Minister, has raised three daughters."
- 2014: Piers Akerman: "The ABC has tried to foist its left-wing agenda on the nation. Even the cartoon character Peppa Pig pushes a weird feminist line that would be closer to the hearts of Labor's Handbag Hit Squad than the pre-school audience it is aimed at".
- 2015: The Australian, for in their obituary of Colleen McCollough, describing the late author as "plain of feature and certainly overweight".
- 2016: Andrew Bolt, for saying it was difficult to debate Linda Burney because she was "gorgeous" and a woman.
- 2017: Andrew Bolt, for remarking on a Human Rights Commission report which found that 51% of university students were sexually harassed last year, "Yes, we should be shocked and visibly upset... that the Commission perpetrated such a hoax. We should be shocked and upset that not one university boss had the guts to call out this fraud of a study".
- 2018: Tim Blair, for his quote "February 11: International Day of Women and Girls in Science. Frankly, wasn’t it better when they used rabbits."
- 2019: Alan Jones for his on-air comments hoping Scott Morrison would get, "tough here with a few backhanders... She’s a clown, Jacinda Ardern… I just wonder whether Scott Morrison is going to be fully briefed to shove a sock down her throat".
- 2020: Michael Leunig for his cartoon of mothers being too "busy on Instagram".
- 2021: radio presenter Jeremy Cordeaux for his comment on Brittany Higgins' rape allegation: "I just ask myself why the Prime Minister doesn’t call it out for what it is — a silly little girl who got drunk".
- 2022: Pastor Brian Houston of the Hillsong Church for defending a staff member who had committed sexual assault by declaring "we're not talking about a sexual predator here.... a young married man who did something stupid, got much drunker than he should... and got himself in a bad situation. That's it".

=== Silver Ernie – Judicial ===
- 1994: Justices Bland and Bollen
- 1995: Justice John Gallop, Australian Capital Territory Supreme Court (upon imposing a bond upon a man convicted of raping a 12-year-old girl): "Our jails would be full if we locked up everyone who did this."
- 1996: Magistrate Ron Gething
- 1997: Judge Nigel Clarke
- 1998: Judge Nigel Clarke
- 1999: Magistrate #1: in response to a survey about domestic violence and apprehended violence orders, saying "hallelujah, women cause a lot of problems by nagging, bitching, and emotionally hurting men. Men cannot bitch back for hormonal reasons and often have no recourse but violence".
- 2000: Justice Kennedy
- 2001: Magistrate Steven Scarlett
- 2002: High Court of Australia for reducing damages payable to a widow who "because of her age and circumstances was likely to remarry".
- 2003: Justice Roddy Meagher, for saying "If you find a woman who is No 1 in the merit list, of course she should be appointed [to the High Court], but there is no such person."
- 2004: Paul Reynolds: for saying to his client "just let me feel those puppies then" (referring to her breasts).
- 2005: John Dorris and Ian Harrison
- 2006: Chris Papadopoulos: for saying that a rape was "at the very bottom of the scale of seriousness" and brief.
- 2008: Roland Day
- 2009: Judge David Smith
- 2011: Clayton Utz for saying why there were only 20% women partners: "Certainly they are all females but each of them are extremely competent lawyers."
- 2012: Senior Constable Cary Coolican, for saying "Many sexual assault victims were too drunk or stoned to remember the details of the attacks… we would be encouraging people to make responsible choices regarding who they drink with and the quantity that is consumed. Some decisions may result in risky behaviour and unsafe actions."
- 2013: Professor Paul Wilson: "My findings were remarkably similar to studies in California and Scandinavia which suggest child victims of adult sex offenders are generally willing or active participants, and that they not infrequently initiate the sexual relationship."
- 2014: Philip Stricklan QC, for suggesting that former MP Jodie McKay's recall of a conversation might not be accurate because she was in "an emotional state".
- 2015: Detective Inspector Michael Hughes, for commenting after the murder of Masa Vuketic that women should protect themselves from daylight attacks by not going outside unaccompanied.
- 2016: Barrister Ben Mallick, for defending a taxi driver accused of sexual assault saying, "the attack would not have happened if the woman had sat in the back seat".
- 2017: Victorian judge Christopher Ryan, for describing a 14-year-old sexual assault victim as "nubile" and "worldly".
- 2018: Magistrate Michael Barko who described a domestic assault charge as "a lower-end allegation that happens in every second house" and accused the woman of "slapping the court in the face" for failing to turn up.
- 2019: Police Officer Neil Punchard, for giving a woman's details to her violent former husband, and texting "just tell her you know where she lives and leave it at that. Lol. She will flip."
- 2020: Detective Mark Thompson, for his comments on Hannah Clarke's murder being due to "a husband being driven too far".
- 2021: NSW District Court Judge Robert Sutherland for wishing a man "Good luck" as he overturned an assault conviction against him. The man, Nicholas Drummond, had been convicted in a lower court after he had told a woman to "put her tits away", and punched her. Judge Sutherland noted that the woman's "dress might have been perceived by a former student of Knox to be provocative”, referring to the elite Knox Grammar School, which Drummond had attended.
- 2022: The Queensland Police, as a result of an officer giving evidence to an inquiry into domestic violence declaring that colleagues had described rape as "surprise sex", domestic violence as "just foreplay", and describing a rape as "too ugly to be raped".

=== The Warney for Sport ===
- 2000: Nick Bideau
- 2001: Cameron Williams: "He needed to see her breasts to get pumped up for the show."
- 2002: Ray Hadley for betting that Germaine Greer regretted burning her bra in the 60s after seeing a photo of her on her "sixty something" birthday.
- 2003: Damir Dokic, for saying that almost half of female tennis players were lesbians and that he'd kill himself if his daughter were one.
- 2004: Bulldogs chief executive Malcolm Noad, for saying "Let's believe nothing happened in Coffs Harbour," referring to an allegation of gang rape.
- 2005: Willie Mason
- 2006: Grant Birse, Netball Australia marketing manager: for saying commentator Anne Sargeant was "old and detrimental" to the game.
- 2008: Sam Newman: for sticking a picture of Caroline Wilson (sports writer from The Age newspaper) to a mannequin dressed in lingerie and then making inappropriate remarks while touching the mannequin while on live TV.
- 2009: Newcastle Knights player Simon Williams, for a comment on the Matthew Johns group sex scandal: "It's not during the act, it's the way you treat them afterwards. It could have been avoided if the players had put her in a cab and said, 'Thanks for that.'"
- 2010: Andrew Johns
- 2011: Ex-AFL player Peter 'Spida' Everitt: for saying "Girls! When will you learn! At 3am when you are blind drunk & you decide to go home with a guy, it's not for a cup of Milo!" on Twitter.
- 2012: Basketball Australia, for flying the female basketball team to the Olympics economy class, and the male team business class (despite Lauren Jackson being the Australian flag-bearer).
- 2013: Nick Riewoldt - said that teammate Stephen Milne who was charged with four counts of rape, should be allowed to continue playing because "Milney is the absolute heart and soul of the football club."
- 2014: South Coast Winter Swimming Association, for in response to women swimmers wanting to join the club moved the following motions: "That the name of the South Coast Winter Swimming association should be changed to the South Coast Men's Winter Swimming Association. Member affiliation of the South Coast Winter Swimming Association is limited to males".
- 2015: Football Federation Australia, for paying the Matildas below minimum wage, just $21,000 per year, with no maternity leave, in contrast to the $6,000 base payment that the Socceroos get for every international game (the women get just $500).
- 2016: Eddie McGuire, for joking about drowning Caroline Wilson.
- 2017: Dale Simmons, President of the Cervantes Tiger Sharks Football Club in WA, for calling AFL umpire Eleni Glouftsis, "a dopey mole" and "a stupid bitch" and that she would change her mind on umpiring decisions because she was a woman.
- 2018: Cricket Australia for sacking a female employee, Angela Williamson after she campaigned for abortion reform on social media.
- 2019: Seven Network, for after receiving a significant amount of harassment regarding a photograph of Tayla Harris, removing the photo rather than moderating the trolls.
- 2020: Israel Folau, for claiming the bushfires were caused by the legalisation of abortion and same-sex marriage.
- 2021: Ricky Stuart, coach of the Canberra Raiders rugby team for saying: "If I can’t have tough conversations with my better players, I might as well coach netball".
- 2022: Journalist Tom Morris, for stating of a female sports broadcaster "Unfortunately she’s a lesbian lads – hottest girl at Fox by a long way. Unfortunately she’s got a licker licence. She’s very good at it".

=== The Fred – Clerical, Culinary, Celebrity ===
- 2001: Archbishop Peter Jensen
- 2002: Archbishop George Pell, for saying that abortion was a worse moral scandal than sexual abuse of young people by priests.
- 2003: Neil Perry
- 2004: Tooheys, for an ad featuring a sign saying "boys, if you win you can have our sisters".
- 2005: Sheikh Feiz Mohammad
- 2006: Tom Cruise (attributed with a quote that "Katie is tucked away, and that her life will thereon be about being a mother") and Peter West.
- 2008: Archbishop Peter Jensen and the Reverend Mark Driscoll.
- 2009: Pastor Danny Nalliah: for blaming the Black Saturday bushfires on Victoria's abortion laws.
- 2011: Dr Barry Walters, who said that "older mothers are selfish, self-centred and burden their children later in life with geriatric parents."
- 2012: Family Voice Australia, for arguing against charges to the provocation defence saying "The exclusion would effectively rule out the classic case of a husband unexpectedly arriving home to find his wife engaged in a sexual act with another man... these circumstances have traditionally been held to warrant a reduction in the seriousness of the offence from murder to manslaughter."
- 2013: Alan Jones: "Every person in the caucus of the Labor Party knows that Julia Gillard is a liar… The old man recently died a few weeks ago of shame, to think that he has a daughter who told lies every time she stood for Parliament."
- 2014: Kyle and Jackie O, for their on-air questioning of Sports Journalist, Erin Molan on how many sportsmen she has had sex with, whether she has had a boob job, and whether she has ever slept with a cricketer.
- 2015: Fred Nile, for describing childcare centres are "daytime orphanages", and school principal Omar Hallak, for refusing female students to participate in running events as it may cause them to lose their virginity.
- 2016: Rolf Harris, for his song "Gutter Girls", which he wrote in prison, containing the lyrics, "Sleeping in the daytime, lying every night / She’s scheming, screaming bloody rape and she’s got you in her sight".
- 2017: Keysar Trad, former President of the Australian Federation of Islamic Councils, for saying "using violence against women is a last resort for men, step three after counselling, buying her chocolates or taking her out to dinner".
- 2018: Don Burke, for excusing the allegations of sexual misconduct and misogyny using his self-diagnosed Asperger syndrome.
- 2019: John Marsden, for saying "Men who feel rage as a result of the failure of their mothers to effectively manage the inevitable eventual separation between mothers and their sons…are highly likely to project that rage onto future intimate partners, and often all women."
- 2020: Council for the Order of Australia for awarding Bettina Arndt an AM. And Shore School boys for their 'Triwizard Shorenament' challenge.
- 2021: shared between St Luke's Grammar School and Professor Magnus Nyden, dean of science and Engineering at Macquarie University. Staff at St Luke's had asked male students to rank the qualities they regarded highly in a woman, and awarded more points to boys who valued virginity, looks, and Christian values than to those who valued generosity or adventurousness. Nyden stated that there shouldn't be more women in the sciences because "a woman is biologically wired to be more concerned about people, and men about things".

=== The Clinton/Trump – for repeat offenders ===
- 1998: John Howard
- 1999: Piers Akerman and Alan Jones
- 2000: John Howard
- 2001: John Howard
- 2002: Tony Abbott
- 2003: John Howard
- 2004: Tony Abbott
- 2005: Tony Abbott
- 2006: Tony Abbott
- 2007: John Howard
- 2008: Tony Abbott
- 2009: Kyle Sandilands
- 2010: Tony Abbott
- 2011: Tony Abbott
- 2012: Peter Jensen
- 2013: Tony Abbott
- 2014: Tony Abbott
- 2015: Tony Abbott and Mark Latham
- 2016: Mark Latham
- 2017: Mark Latham
- 2018: Tony Abbott
- 2019: Alan Jones
- 2020: Mark Latham
- 2021: Scott Morrison, for the remark that won him the Silver Ernie (see above), plus his reaction to the Women's March for Justice "This is a vibrant liberal democracy Mr Speaker. Not far from here, such marches, even now, are being met with bullets, but not here in this country", and for observing "Well, gee, I bet it felt good to get that out" after hearing Australian of the Year Grace Tame describe her sexual assault.
- 2022: Scott Morrison

=== The Elaine – for women ===
- 1994: Wendy Jones
- 1995: Blanche d'Alpuget, for saying "I do" to Bob Hawke.
- 1996: Kathryn Greiner
- 1997: Janet McDonald
- 1998: Bettina Arndt
- 1999: Jocelyn Newman, for saying that people have other options if they can't afford childcare.
- 2000: Miranda Devine
- 2001: Pru Goward
- 2002: Bettina Arndt: for suggesting that women couldn't be both mothers and MPs.
- 2003: Sally Loane
- 2004: Jackie Kelly for saying that no-one in her electorate is interested in university education as "Penrith is pram city".
- 2005: Colleen McCullough
- 2006: Danna Vale
- 2007: Bettina Arndt
- 2008: Sophie Mirabella for taunting Julia Gillard for her childlessness: "You won't need [Kevin Rudd's] taxpayer-funded nanny, will you?"
- 2009: Miranda Devine for: "Decades of androgynous feminism have stamped on chivalry, deriding men who opened doors or stood back for women as being sexist and patronising. It would have been better for women if feminism had appealed to men's better natures."
- 2010: Alannah Hill (Genevieve Jacobs ABC radio award rescinded by Meredith Burgmann).
- 2011: Pru Goward for attacking the community workers equal pay case, saying they "failed to make their case' and referred to the 'so-called' wage gap".
- 2012: Kelly O'Dwyer, for calling Tanya Plibersek, Nicola Roxon and Deborah O'Neill the "handbag hit squad".
- 2013: Janet Albrechtsen for: "While lack of humour infects both sides of politics, the Labor girls in particular need to loosen their pigtails. In Canberra today, there are far too few Fred Dalys and far too many Tanya Pliberseks."
- 2014: Tie between Michaelia Cash: "In terms of feminism, I've never been someone who really associates with that movement. That movement was a set of ideologies from many, many decades ago", and Miranda Devine: "After rising to the top of her party through affirmative action, out first female prime minister cynically played the victim card. Her unscrupulous complaints about sexism and misogyny just empowered the worst kind of women to excuse their own failings, and justified every sexist stereotype".
- 2015: Miranda Devine, for stating that "feminism is now well past its use-by date. It has just become an excuse for unhinged individuals with Daddy issues to indulge a mean streak".
- 2016: Pauline Hanson, for linking domestic violence to decisions by the family court in her maiden speech "Women make frivolous claims and believe they have the sole right to the children. Until we treat mums and dads with the same courtesy and rights, we will continue to see murders due to sheer frustration and depression and mental illness caused by this unworkable system."
- 2017: Journalist Louise Roberts, for writing, "If I’m getting paid less than a man for doing the same job, it's not his fault. It is mine, through life choices I have made for myself".
- 2018: Michaelia Cash, for, after facing questions about misconduct in her staff, "If you want to start discussing staff matters, be very, very careful. Because I'm happy to sit here and name every young woman in Mr Shorten’s office over which rumours in this place abound."
- 2019: Bettina Arndt, for saying: "Feminism…It’s all about rules and regulations to advantage women at the expense of men. Constant male bashing. False accusations of violence being used to destroy men’s lives..."
- 2020: Bettina Arndt, for "remarks least helpful to the sisterhood".
- 2021: shared between Defence Minister Linda Reynolds and Liberal Party Vice President Teena McQueen. Reynolds called Brittany Higgins a "lying cow" over her allegations of being raped by a colleague. Amid claims of serious sexual misconduct in the Australian Parliament, McQueen said she would "kill to be sexually harassed at the moment".
- 2022: Opinion columnist Janet Albrechtsen, for stating that "[Scott Morrison] seems to be frightened of women who think they should be free to roam the landscape, pointing the bone at alleged offenders without benefit of trial or other traditional niceties".

=== The Good Ernie ===
- 1994: Peter Sams
- 1995: Australian Manufacturing Workers Union
- 1996: Ernie Page
- 1997: Peter Cameron
- 1998: Ernie Page
- 1999: George Trumbull
- 2000: Bob Carr
- 2001: Bob Debus, Matt Foley, Rob Hulls and Peter Patmore
- 2002: AMWU members at Carter Holt Harvey for striking until women also got a fair collective agreement
- 2003: Mark Holden
- 2004: Adam Goodes, for calling his mum an inspiration and taking her to the Brownlow Medal dinner.
- 2005: Keysar Trad
- 2006: Gough Whitlam
- 2007: Kevin Rudd
- 2008: Brendan Cannon for condemning rates of violence against women in Australia; Veolia for applying to the Anti-discrimination Commission for exemption from the Anti-Discrimination Act to exclusively employ female drivers.
- 2009: David Gallop
- 2010: Stephen Mayne
- 2011: The PSA for their campaign for domestic violence leave, and Simon Benson for standing up for Julia Gillard's style sense.
- 2012: Stephen Smith, for saying in reference to the Defence Force sexism case, "inappropriate conduct will not be tolerated."
- 2013: Lt General David Morrison for saying: "On all operations, female soldiers and officers have proven themselves worthy of the best traditions of the Australian Army. They are vital to us maintaining our capability now and into the future. If that does not suit you, then get out."
- 2014: Mark Lennon, Secretary of Unions NSW, for giving female staff 2% more superannuation than men, to acknowledge the structural issues that lead to women having one third of the super savings of men when they retire.
- 2015: Luke Ablett, for when speaking about the murder of Masa Vuketic, saying "another woman killed by a man and we are talking about why women shouldn't walk in parks. What is wrong Australia?"
- 2016: Bernard Keane, for condemning Pauline Hanson's "sickening" and "evil" speech linking the family court and domestic violence, and Byron Shire council, for banning Wicked Campers with sexist graffiti from its caravan parks.
- 2017: Australian Cricketers' Association, for giving female cricketers a large pay increase.
- 2018: Brandon Jack, "The following statement is true: rape culture is real. If you roll your eyes at these words, dismissing the idea as an overreaction by hypersensitive feminists, then you are part of the problem. This is something we can no longer hide from – so please, don’t weep for your toxic masculinity."
- 2019: Simon Hansford, for saying that while "the sacredness of life" must be respected, "Christians are called to respond to life with compassion and generosity. Abortion is a health and social issue and should not be a criminal issue", and Victorian Assistant Police Commissioner Luke Cornelius after the murder of another woman in a public place: "The key point is that this is about men’s behaviour, it’s not about women’s behaviour."
- 2020: Sam Neill, for saying that men should "shut up".
- 2021: shared between Liberal Member of Parliament Russell Broadbent and ABC sports reporter Richard Hinds. Broadbent said that male politicians "need to be quiet, listen and learn" about gender issues. Commenting on Raelene Castle, CEO of Rugby Australia, Hinds observed that "I'm 100 percent certain women in power are still held to a much higher account than men".
- 2022: Radio host Kyle Sandilands, for declaring that he did not know how Premier of New South Wales Dominic Perrottet came to power while being opposed to abortion and gay rights.
