= Rupert Grove =

Australian solicitor

- Born: 27 March 1906; Dulwich Hill, New South Wales
- Died: 8 August 1982 (aged 76); Killara, New South Wales
- Education: North Sydney Boys High School; University of Sydney
- Occupation: Solicitor
- Spouse: Ina Margaret (née Hulme)
- Parent(s): Aphra Marian (née McCoy) and Howard Thomas Grove
- Family: 2 daughters Simon Hansford; Grandson; Richard McCoy; Maternal uncle

Rupert Howard Grove (27 March 1906 – 8 August 1982) was an Australian solicitor and a prominent Methodist and Uniting Church layman. The Australian Dictionary of Biography states that, "in the progression towards the union of the Congregational, Methodist and Presbyterian churches in Australia, Grove made a decisive impact."

== Family and education ==
Grove was born at Dulwich Hill, New South Wales to Aphra Marian (née McCoy) and Howard Thomas Grove, a Melbourne-born architect. He attended North Sydney Boys High School and graduated from the University of Sydney with a Bachelor of Laws in 1928. The following year he was admitted as a solicitor and was made a partner in the law firm McCoy, Grove & Atkinson. The firm was founded in 1887 by Grove's maternal uncle, state parliamentarian, Richard McCoy, and closed in 2014. Grove married Ina Margaret Hulme at the Methodist Church, Gordon, in 1935.

== Church affairs ==
Active within his local churches for over forty years, Grove served as a local preacher and lay leader. From positions of youth leadership he went on to the New South Wales Conference (1936–77) and the General Conference (1947–77) of the Methodist Church of Australasia. At conferences he became heavily involved in committee work in many and varied ways. As the Australian Dictionary of Biography states he spread himself over a broad range of responsibilities but was unified by his three principal concerns: the "sound governance of the church at all its levels; its mission to evangelise and to strengthen its influence in the community; and church union, which he believed would create a renewed and influential church."

As church union between the Methodist, Congregational, and Presbyterian churches in Australia came to fruition Grove was highly influential. In 1954 as union was in jeopardy he moved an amendment that deferred further activity. His plan of action was successful and he remained pivotal in the movement to founding the Uniting Church in Australia in 1977.

Grove was a member from 1936 of the Department of Home Missions in the Methodist Church and he was chairman of the board of the United Church in North Australia from 1972 until 1977. He was chairman of the Uniting Church's Commission for National Mission from 1977 until 1982. In Sydney he served as a lay member of the council of the Newington College from 1942 until his death in 1982.

== Death and legacy ==
Survived by his wife and one of their two daughters (Barbara Hansford), he died at his Killara, New South Wales home and was cremated. Grove is commemorated in the naming of The Grove Room in the Newington College Chapel for his many years of service as honorary secretary. His son-in-law, Richard Hansford, replaced him on Newington College Council and in 2000–2001 served as its chairman. Grove's grandson, the Rev Simon Hansford, is the moderator of the Uniting Church in Australia, Synod of New South Wales and the ACT.
