= John Hassell (disambiguation) =

John Hassell (c. 1767 – 1825) was an English painter, engraver, illustrator, and writer.

John Hassell may also refer to:

- John Hassell (settler) (1788–1883), Australian pastoralist
- John Frederick Tasman Hassell (1839–1919), Australian politician

== See also ==
- Jon Hassell (1937–2021), American trumpet player and composer
- John Hassall (disambiguation)
