= Macquarie Grove =

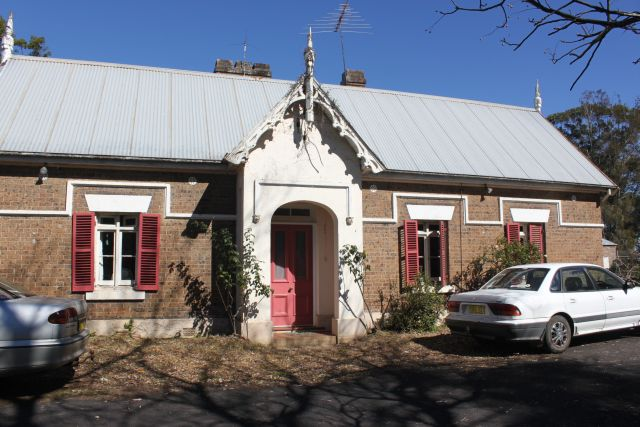

- Location within Sydney Location within Australia
- 34°02′33″S 150°41′32″E
- Location: Aerodrome Road, Cobbitty, Camden, Camden Council, New South Wales, Australia

History
- Built: 1812–1850

Site notes
- Architectural style: Victorian Rustic Gothic

New South Wales Heritage Register
- Official name: Macquarie Grove
- Type: State heritage (built)
- Designated: 2 April 1999
- Reference no.: 493
- Type: Cottage
- Category: Residential buildings (private)

Macquarie Grove is a heritage-listed former airport administration offices and private residence and now private residence located at Aerodrome Road, Cobbitty, in the south-western Sydney suburb of Camden in the Camden Council local government area of New South Wales, Australia. It was built from 1812 to 1850. The property is privately owned. It was added to the New South Wales State Heritage Register on 2 April 1999.

== History ==
After settling at Sydney Cove in 1788, the First Fleet soon found the soil unsuitable for farming and looked for more fertile soils beyond the established boundaries of the colony. By 1795, the settlers had journeyed to the Cumberland Plain and discovered the rich land of the Cowpastures, named after the discovery of a herd of wild cows that had escaped the colony years earlier and wandered west, grazing the land now known as the Camden district.

Following the colonial discovery of the area, the colonial gentry soon regarded it as rich, fertile and suitable land for livestock grazing and pastoral pursuits. The low rambling hills and wide expanses of grass flats were devoid of difficult vegetation and reminded the colonists of the familiar landscape of an English gentleman's park. This environment was considered ideal for the establishment of the wealthy estates so desired by the colonial gentry.

Quickly, the acquisition of land in the district was being sought by private colonists. The newly appointed governor, Lachlan Macquarie, agreed that the northern bank of the Nepean River should be settled and soon had the land surveyed before granting the first of the land allotments to the colonial elite from 1812. These land grants were for large scale allotments and were intended to facilitate large-scale landholdings for the wealthy colonists of the period.

Of these large landholdings, a 162-hectare (400-acre) parcel was granted to Rowland Hassall in 1812. Having arrived at Sydney Cove in 1798 with wife Elizabeth and sons Thomas, Samuel Otoo and Jonathon, Hassall was one of the pioneer colonists and quickly established himself as a prominent settler by acquiring, in addition to leasing, large portions of land around Parramatta and Cobbitty. A missionary, sheep breeder and successful pastoralist, Hassall was appointed Superintendent of NSW Government Stock in 1814 and was responsible for the distribution and maintenance of stock in the Cowpastures region (one of the most extensive stock runs in the colony). During his period as Superintendent (1814–19), Hassall was assisted by his second son Samuel Otoo who himself became a pastoralist.

After receiving the 162-hectare (400-acre) land grant from Governor Macquarie in 1812, Hassall named the property Macquarie Grove and built the original farmhouse (now Hassall Cottage) in an elevated position beside the Nepean River in c. 1813.

Governor Macquarie was to visit the farm in 1815 during a tour of the Cowpastures region and, after camping overnight, referred to the property as "Mr Hassall's finely appointed and beautiful farm". With the development of the farm and the formal establishment of the Camden township in 1840, Hassall went on to construct a larger homestead to the south-west of the original farmhouse'.

Following Rowland Hassall's death at Parramatta in 1820, his son, Samuel Otoo, inherited the Macquarie Grove property and occupied the farmhouse (now Hassall Cottage) with his wife Lucy Mileham and family. At this time, Macquarie Grove was the most established and valuable property owned by Rowland Hassall and Samuel continued to run the property as his father had done. With the development of the farm and the formal establishment of the Camden township in 1840, Otoo's son James Mileham Hassall constructed a larger homestead on the property to the south-west of the original farmhouse. The new homestead was called "Macquarie Grove" and the farmhouse renamed "Lucyville".

Following Samuel's early passing at aged 33, Lucy remarried and moved away from the property, only returning in the late 1840s to occupy Lucyville following the death of her second husband. Also at this time, Mileham Hassall, was occupying the Macquarie Grove homestead with his family but, following the damaging floods of the 1860s, James moved his family and leased the property to the schoolmaster William Gordon for its use as a boys' school.

As the Hassall family fortune dwindled, James sold the Macquarie Grove property (and both cottages) to Henry Carey Dangar MLC, the prominent pastoralist, property owner and racing enthusiast in 1877. Macquarie Grove was not intended to be a commercial venture for Dangar but rather to become the family's summer retreat for three months each year and also the produce provider for their Sydney home. As well as producing butter, eggs and poultry, the farm also provided for the farm stock and the retired race and carriage horses that grazed the property. At this time, a portion of the Macquarie Grove property was used as a rifle range by the Rifle Club of Camden. A horse track was also established to the rear of the cottages.

Macquarie Grove was to have a number of short-term owners after the Dangar period (from James White MLC MLA to Henry Lamont Mackellar in 1896; to David James Maxwell in 1900; to Percy Crossing in 1907; and to James Pritchard in 1913). Finally, Macquarie Grove was purchased by Arthur Macarthur-Onslow (great grandson of the district's pioneer John Macarthur) in 1916 who used the property as a sheep farm and as part of the Camden Park Co-operative Dairy scheme.

Arthur's second son, Edward, attempted but struggled to maintain the farm as his father had and, in 1937, spurred on by his keen interest in aviation, sold the entire sheep flock and converted the former horse racetrack into a private aerodrome. Edward established the Macquarie Grove Flying School which was used for aviation teaching as well as for recreation and public displays of flying, gliding and parachuting.

At the time, Edward had restored The Groom's Cottage, in which he lived with his wife Winifred, using bricks from the derelict stables and had renamed the property "April Cottage" after the month they had moved in. However, due to an expanding family, Edward and Winifred "swapped" residences with Edward's mother Sylvia (widow to Arthur) and moved into Macquarie Grove. Upon settling into her new home, Sylvia renamed the house "Hassall Cottage".

Upon completion of a period of initial training, the Macquarie Grove Flying and Glider School was officially opened by the Commonwealth Minister for Civil Aviation, James Fairbairn, on 30 September 1939.

As Edward was enlisted for World War II and was due to leave Macquarie Grove, he decided that, rather than close the aerodrome, he would sign a Gentleman's Agreement with Minister Fairbairn (also a personal friend) in 1939 for the government's occupation and use of the property for the duration of the war. To achieve this, a portion of the neighbouring "Wivenhoe" property was acquired and the runway extended to a length necessary for use by the Commonwealth Government.

In 1940, the Crown acquired 468 acres of Macquarie Grove for the purposes of defence and aviation during wartime for wartime activities. The Macarthur-Onslow family was to retain only 15 acres (including Hassall Cottage but not Macquarie Grove which was reused as officers' quarters).

In late 1942 when the Macarthur-Onslow family returned to the property, No 13 OBU (Operational Base Unit) was firmly established and, after the unfortunate death of Minister Fairbairn in 1940 due to an air crash, any attempts by the family to re-acquire the Macquarie Grove property were in vain.

In a final effort, Edward achieved a five-year lease from 1946 in which he was able to re-open the flying school. The Royal Australian Air Force remained at Macquarie Grove for some time after World War II and the cottages were only able to be re-purchased (on small land parcels) by the Macarthur-Onslow family in 1987. The remainder of the 468-acre Macquarie Grove property remains under the ownership of the Commonwealth Government which has established the Camden Airport on the site.

== Description ==
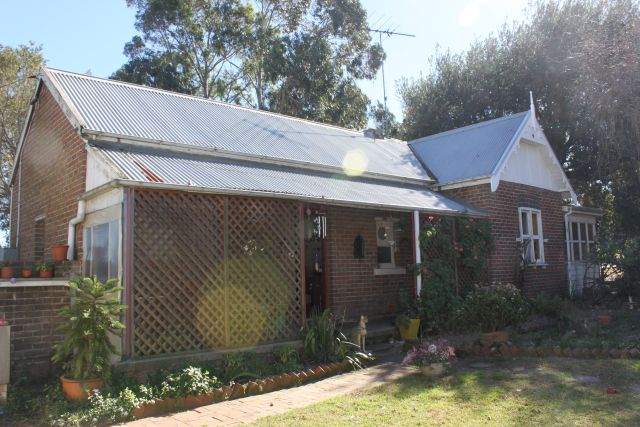
Additional wing

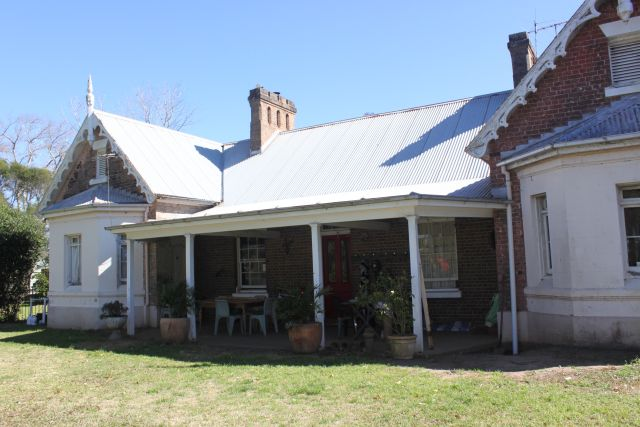
Additional wing

Overlooking the Nepean River and towards the township of Camden, Macquarie Grove is a picturesque Victorian Rustic Gothic brick cottage residence. Like many Australian versions of the Rustic Gothic style, Macquarie Grove was constructed of brick and stone on a modest scale but with steeply pitched gable roof and highly decorated bargeboards. In keeping with the picturesque style, the house is sited to take full advantage of the aesthetic values of the surrounding natural environment and cultural scenery.

The core of the house is a four-roomed cottage which was extended with balanced wings on either end to create an "H" plan. The added wings were completed in face brick with plastered window dressings, bay windows, elaborate timber bargeboards with finials, Victorian brick chimneys and a decorative Gothic side porch on the western elevation. The gabled roofs are sheeted with corrugated iron.

Macquarie Grove is complemented by outbuildings (a cottage residence/nursery and garage/studio) that enclose the rear garden.

The property contains a number of significant cultural plantings including an established white cedar tree (Melia azedarach), common holly tree (Ilex aquifolium) and mature camphor laurel tree (Cinnamomum camphora). It is estimated that the camphor laurel tree dates from the mid-19th century.

=== Modifications and dates ===
- Early 1900s – construction of outbuildings (brick servant's quarters and weatherboard nursery)
- 1940s – outbuildings modified to accommodated aviation defence use and brick garage constructed

== Heritage listing ==
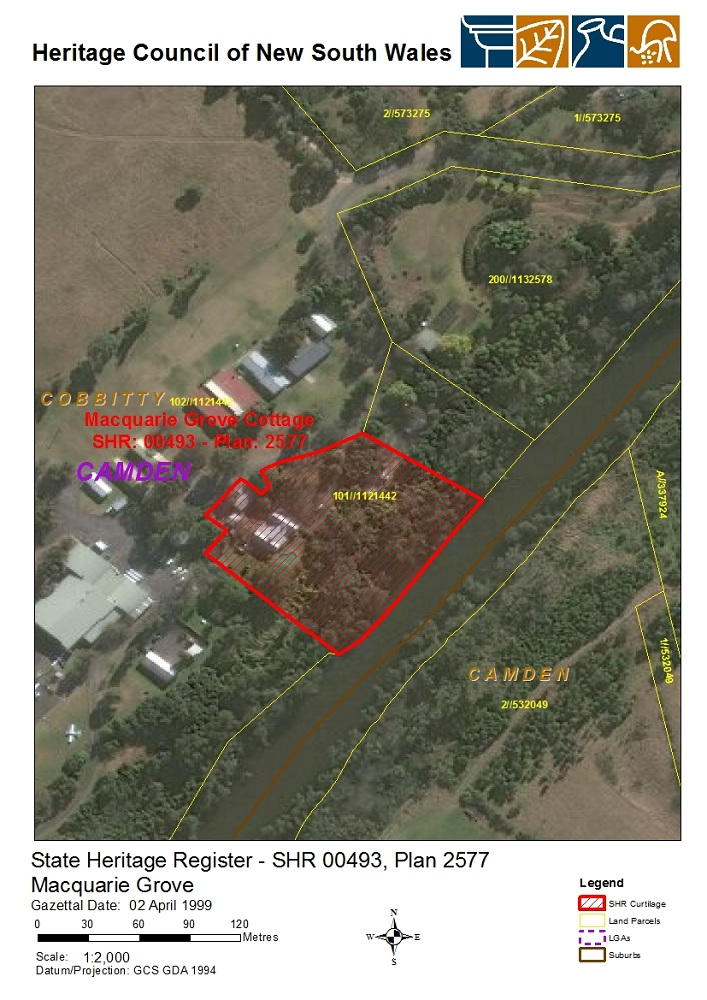
Heritage boundaries

Macquarie Grove is of state heritage significance as part of the Macquarie Grove property, a very early and substantial 162-hectare (400-acre) land grant from Governor Lachlan Macquarie in 1812. The property was one of the first allotments granted in the Cowpastures district and Macquarie Grove was the second residence constructed on the property. Macquarie Grove was, however, the main homestead for the property.

Macquarie Grove also has state heritage significance for its association with a number of prominent people and pastoral families. Originally granted by Governor Macquarie to Rowland Hassall, the property was later owned by Henry Carey Dangar MLC and Arthur Macarthur-Onslow. The Macarthur-Onslow family have been long-standing owners of the property and re-purchased portions of the site from the Commonwealth Government in 1987.

Macquarie Grove, and the greater Macquarie Grove property, also has associations with the establishment of the Macquarie Grove Flying and Glider School and the operation of the site by the Commonwealth Government as an air-force base during World War II. Following the war, the site has been developed into the Camden Airport.

Macquarie Grove was listed on the New South Wales State Heritage Register on 2 April 1999 having satisfied the following criteria.

The place is important in demonstrating the course, or pattern, of cultural or natural history in New South Wales.

Macquarie Grove has state heritage significance as part of the Macquarie Grove property. At a substantial 162 hectares (400 acres), the allotment was a very early land grant in NSW and one of the first granted by Governor Lachlan Macquarie in the Cowpastures district.

Allocated to Rowland Hassall in 1812, Macquarie Grove was the second residence constructed on the property. Macquarie Grove was, however, the main homestead for the property. The establishment of the Macquarie Grove property predates the formation of the Camden township. The construction of Macquarie Grove occurred during the same period of the establishment of the township (c. 1850s).

The place has a strong or special association with a person, or group of persons, of importance of cultural or natural history of New South Wales's history.

Macquarie Grove has state heritage significance for its association with a number of prominent people and pastoral families.

The Macquarie Grove property was originally granted by Governor Lachlan Macquarie to Rowland Hassall (a missionary, sheep breeder and later Superintendent of the Cowpastures) who built Macquarie Grove. The cottage was later owned by Henry Carey Dangar MLC (the prominent pastoralist, land owner and racing enthusiast) and finally by Arthur Macarthur-Onslow (great grandson of the district's pioneer John Macarthur).

The Macarthur-Onslow family has had an ongoing association with the Macquarie Grove property since the original purchase of the property by Arthur Macarthur-Onslow in 1916. Although the property has been reduced in size by government acquisition of land, the Macarthur-Onslow family does retain ownership of the original farmhouse and homestead on the property.

Macquarie Grove, and the greater Macquarie Grove property, also has associations with the establishment of the Macquarie Grove Flying and Glider School and the operation of the site by the Commonwealth Government as an air-force base during World War II. Following the war, the site has been developed into the Camden Airport.

The place is important in demonstrating aesthetic characteristics and/or a high degree of creative or technical achievement in New South Wales.

Purposefully sited overlooking the Nepean River towards the township of Camden, Macquarie Grove is a picturesque Victorian Rustic Gothic brick cottage residence. Like many Australian versions of the Rustic Gothic style, Macquarie Grove is positioned in its landscape to take in the aesthetic values of the surrounding natural environment and cultural scenery.

Upon visiting the Macquarie Grove property in 1815, Governor Macquarie referred to it as "Mr Hassall's finely appointed and beautiful farm".

The Macquarie Grove property contains a number of significant cultural plantings including an established White Cedar tree (Melia azedarach), Common Holly tree (Ilex aquifolium) and mature Camphor Laurel tree (Cinnamomum camphora). It is estimated that the Camphor Laurel tree dates from the mid-19th century.

The place has a strong or special association with a particular community or cultural group in New South Wales for social, cultural or spiritual reasons.

With a longheld use as a private residence, the social significance of Macquarie Grove is limited. However, Macquarie Grove is widely recognised as an early colonial property and has some social significance for the greater Camden district (once the Cowpastures).

The place has potential to yield information that will contribute to an understanding of the cultural or natural history of New South Wales.

As a very early land grant and mid-19th century construction, there is potential for further investigation into the property to reveal new information about its construction and use.

The place possesses uncommon, rare or endangered aspects of the cultural or natural history of New South Wales.

Macquarie Grove is of state heritage significance as a rare surviving example of an early residential homestead built on one of the first allotments granted by Governor Lachlan Macquarie. Granted in 1812, the Macquarie Grove property was one of the first large landholdings of the Cowpastures district.

The place is important in demonstrating the principal characteristics of a class of cultural or natural places/environments in New South Wales.

Macquarie Grove is of state heritage significance as a representative example of an early residential homestead, built on one of the first allotments granted by Governor Lachlan Macquarie in 1812. This period saw the early development and release of landholdings in the Cowpastures district and the Macquarie Grove property reflect the development of the country estates acquired by the wealthy colonists during this period.

== See also ==
- Australian residential architectural styles
