= Simon Hansford =

The Reverend Simon Hansford BA, BTh.

Moderator of the Uniting Church in Australia, Synod of New South Wales and the ACT
- In office 29 September 2017 – 14 September 2023
- Preceded by: Rev. Myung Hwa Park
- Succeeded by: Rev. Faaimata Havea Hiliau

Personal details
- Born: 3 June 1963 (age 62) Sydney, Australia
- Spouse: Fiona Hansford
- Relations: Richard Hansford (father); Rupert Grove (grandfather)
- Children: 2 daughters
- Education: Newington College; United Theological College, North Parramatta
- Occupation: Minister

Simon Richard Hansford (born 3 June 1963) is an Australian Uniting Church minister who served as Moderator of the Uniting Church in Australia, Synod of New South Wales & ACT between 2017 and 2023. He is known for his advocacy of changing drug laws in New South Wales for his support of the 2023 Australian Indigenous Voice referendum and that there is there is no place for domestic and family violence in his church.

== Birth and family ==
Hansford was born in Sydney, the son of Barbara (née Grove) and Richard Hansford. His maternal grandfather was Rupert Grove (1906–1982), of whom the Australian Dictionary of Biography states: "in the progression towards the union of the Congregational, Methodist and Presbyterian churches in Australia, Grove made a decisive impact." Rupert Grove and his son-in-law, Richard Hansford, were partners in the Sydney legal firm McCoy, Grove & Atkinson.

== Education ==
Hansford attended Newington College (1970–1980) commencing in the Preparatory School at Lindfield. He studied for the ministry at the United Theological College (1988-1990) at North Parramatta, which is now a part of Charles Sturt University.

== Clerical life ==
His first ministry placement was in Dubbo, New South Wales, in 1991. After 12 years in Dubbo he spent three years in Queanbeyan. He then served as Presbytery Minister in north-western NSW for seven years before his 2012 appointment as the Minister of Southside Uniting Church in Tamworth.

== Marriage and children ==
Hansford is married to Fiona and they have two daughters, Rachel and Miriam.
