= Margaret Reeson =

Australian historian

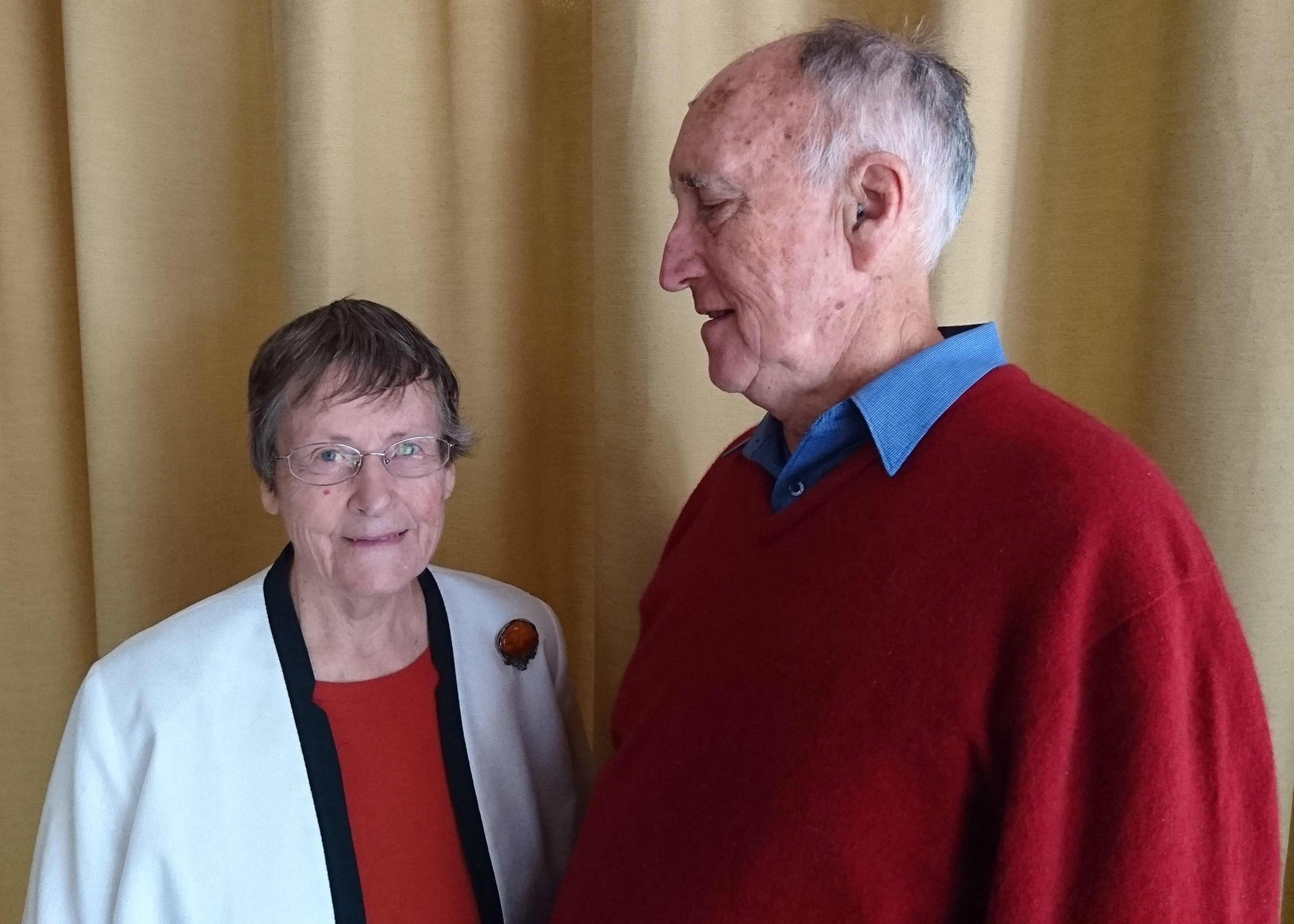
Margaret Reeson & Rev. Ron Reeson, 2018-05-27

Margaret Reeson (née Higman) (born 1938) is an Australian historian, biographer, and author, and prominent leader of the Uniting Church in Australia.

== History ==
Reeson trained as a teacher, and began this career in 1957. She moved to Papua New Guinea in 1961, working in the Papua New Guinea Highlands as a teacher and missionary. She married Reverend Ron Reeson in 1966, at the time a minister of the Methodist Church of Australasia, and they continued as missionaries in PNG's Southern Highlands Province. From this time came a deep feeling for the history of PNG and Australia's involvement in that land and its people, notably during World War II. At this time, she began her research and literary life with Torn between two worlds (1972), a book about the effect of Christianity on the native peoples of the Southern Highlands.

On return to Australia in 1979, for Ron to take up ministry with the Central Belconnen Uniting Church in the Belconnen area of Canberra, Australian Capital Territory, Reeson commenced studies as an historian, and used her interest in PNG to research the stories of missionaries there during WW2. This work on the lives of Christian women has resulted in various published biographies, biographical novels, and Australian social history books, and the award of a Master of Arts by research from the Australian National University.

== Church leadership ==
Reeson had a de facto leadership role in churches and ministries where her husband was the minister and, from 1987, senior minister for the Presbytery of Canberra Region. However, she also undertook training as a Lay Preacher, and achieved recognition through active involvement in a number of church councils, working groups, Boards and task groups within the Uniting Church in Australia, notably its New South Wales Synod, and was appointed as Moderator of the Synod for the term 2000–2002.

== Family ==
The Reesons have three adult children. Their daughter, Ruth Powell, is Director of the National Church Life Survey and a professor at the Australian Catholic University.

Reeson's brother is Emeritus Professor Barry Higman, an historian with interests in historical geography and historical demography, with particular reference to Australia and the West Indies.

== Published works ==
Reeson's published work includes:

- Torn between two worlds (1972) - examines the effect of Christianity on native PNG peoples of the Mendi region
- Currency Lass (1985) - biographical fiction based on the life of Mary Cover Lawry née Hassall(1799–1825)
- Overseas missions of the Australian Methodist Church. Volume 5. Papua New Guinea highlands : a bridge is built : a story of the United Church in the Highlands of Papua New Guinea (1987), with A. Harold Wood
- Certain Lives: the compelling story of the hope, tragedy and triumph of three generations of women (1987) - biographical fiction, based on the lives of New South Wales pioneers, Anna Rootes (1804–1888), Mary Playford (1840–1918), and Grace Higman (1875–1935)
- No fixed address : the story of Noreen Towers and her friendship with Sydney's homeless (1991) - biography of Rev. Noreen Towers and her work with the Wesley Central Mission (Sydney, N.S.W.)
- Whereabouts unknown (1993) - examines the Australian Army Lark Force at Rabaul and the loss of over 800 POWs with the sinking of the Japanese ship, Montevideo Maru
- "Rev. Dr. George Brown 1835-1917: ‘one of the toughest morsels" (also dealing with his wife, Sarah Lydia Brown née Wallis); (paper), 1996
- A Singular Woman (1999) - a biographical novel on Mary Elizabeth Brown
- Certain lives : the compelling story of the hope, tragedy and triumph of three generations of women (1999)
- A Very Long War: The Families Who Waited (2000) - about the experiences of the families of men missing in the New Guinea Islands during World War 2 (based on her 1996 thesis, "A very long war: the experiences of the families of the missing men of the New Guinea islands, 1942-1945")
- Kakokunaru kishibe kara : Ōsutoraria to Nihon no Nyūginia-sen / Sutību Burādo, Tamura Keiko hen (過酷なる岸辺から : オーストラリアと日本のニューギニア戦 / スティーブ・ブラード, 田村恵子編) "From a hostile shore : Australia and Japan at war in New Guinea" (2004), chapter; edited by Steven Bullard and Tamura Keiko

Preceded by Rev Dr David Manton	Moderator of the NSW Synod; Uniting Church in Australia; September 2000 - 2002	Succeeded by Rev Alistair Christie
