= Faaimata Hiliau =

Australian church leader

The Reverend Faaimata (Mata) Havea Hiliau

Moderator of the Uniting Church in Australia, Synod of New South Wales and the ACT
- Incumbent
- Assumed office 14 September 2023
- Preceded by: Simon Hansford

Personal details
- Occupation: Minister

Rev. Faaimata (Mata) Havea Hiliau is an Australian religious leader. She currently serves as the moderator of the NSW/ACT Synod of the Uniting Church in Australia. Rev Hiliau is the first Tongan-Australian to fill the role.

At the time of her election, Hiliau said she wanted to focus on vaccine hesitancy in Pacific Islander communities and climate change in her tenure as moderator. She was featured on ABC TV's Compass in an episode examining change at the Uniting Church, watched by 166,000 viewers on 24 August 2023.

In October 2023, Hiliau spoke at a gathering of Pasifika leaders, Uniting Church members and others at Sydney Olympic Park to raise awareness for the disproportionate impact of climate change on Pasifika, First Nations, and Western Sydney communities. In November 2023, she joined other religious leaders representing the Christian, Muslim and Buddhist faiths in visiting government ministers and MPs in Canberra to call for an end to fossil fuel projects in Australia.
