= Elaine Nile =

Australian politician (1936–2011)

Member of the Legislative Council of New South Wales
- In office 19 March 1988 – 27 August 2002
- Succeeded by: Gordon Moyes

Personal details
- Born: Elaine Blanche Crealy; 20 March 1936 Waterloo, New South Wales
- Died: 17 October 2011 (aged 75) Sydney, New South Wales
- Party: Christian Democratic Party
- Spouse: Fred Nile (m. 1958)
- Children: 4; 3 Sons, 1 Daughter
- Occupation: Comptometrist

Elaine Blanche Nile (20 March 1936 – 17 October 2011) was an Australian politician who represented the Christian Democratic Party in the New South Wales Legislative Council between 1988 and 2002. Nile was married to Fred Nile from 1958.

== Early life ==
Born on 20 March 1936 in Waterloo in Sydney the daughter of a glass blower and a factory worker, she was a comptometrist from 1951 to 1958 and a police matron at Darlinghurst Court from 1977 to 1981. From 1981 to 1986 she was manager of the Australian Christian Solidarity Paper. She was also an organiser and lecturer at Gardener's Road High School in Mascot.

== Political career ==
In 1958, she married Fred Nile, leader of the Call to Australia group (later the Christian Democratic Party) in the New South Wales Legislative Council from 1981. Mrs Nile was elected to the Legislative Council for Call to Australia in 1988, and served until her retirement due to ill health in 2002.

Her parliamentary career was marked by conservative Christian values. She was a supporter of the constitutional monarchy and the Australians for Constitutional Monarchy. Nile introduced legislation to close abortion clinics and spoke on issues including the Gay Mardi Gras, adoptions by homosexuals, drug abuse among youth, sexual abuse by clergy, family planning, condom vending machines in schools, age of consent for homosexuals, pornography, land valuations, hormone treatment for blood disorders, the M5 motorway exhaust stack, level crossing signposting, Homebush Bay green and gold frogs and Narara Valley high school counselling. Nile introduced a Sexual Offence Damages Bill and a Nudity (Indecent Exposure) in Public Places Prohibition Bill.

Despite opposition from the homosexual community, Nile's most controversial legislative proposal was the Medically Acquired AIDS Victims Compensation Bill, seeking compensation for people who had acquired AIDS through blood transfusions. Nile and her husband successfully opposed amendments to the NSW Anti-Discrimination Act to create offences of homosexual vilification. Feminists criticised her traditional views on the role of women, and the Elaine award was created for the person who made public statements that were considered the most unhelpful to the sisterhood.

Nile initially announced her decision to retire from the Legislative Council on the grounds of ill health in 2000 and John Bradford was endorsed by the Christian Democratic Party as her successor. However, as a result of an internal party dispute due to Bradford's residency, Nile delayed her retirement until 2002 and Gordon Moyes was ultimately appointed to the council, ahead of Bradford.

At the 2007 federal election, Nile was endorsed in second position of the Christian Democratic Party for the Senate; but was not successful in winning a sufficient quota. Nile was listed as the fifth candidate on the Christian Democratic Party (Fred Nile Group) ticket at the 2011 state election, with only Paul Green as the first candidate, gaining a quota.

== Death ==
Nile was diagnosed with non-Hodgkin's lymphoma in the early 2000s and it initially appeared that her treatment had been successful. However the disease recurred and in 2008 she was given only six days to live. Her treatment included radical therapy involving radiation being injected into the bloodstream. She finally succumbed to the disease three years later, dying in Calvary Hospital, Sydney.
