= Mary Cover Lawry =

Australian missionary (1799–1825)

Mary Cover Lawry (née Hassall) (12 December 1799 – 25 December 1825) was a missionary, as were her father Rowland Hassall and husband Walter Lawry. She was born in Parramatta during its early days.

== Early life ==
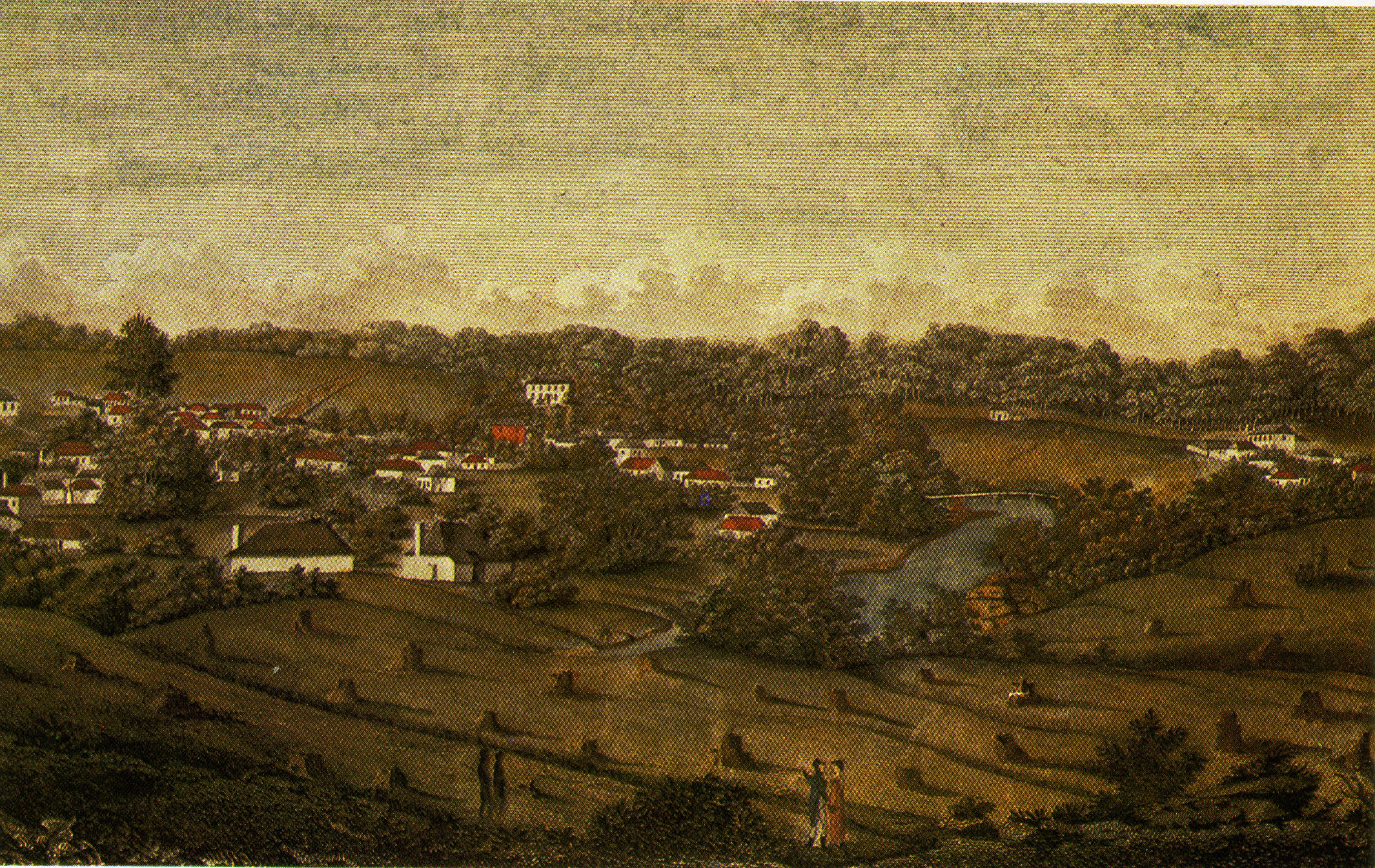
Parramatta, 1812

Mary Cover Hassall, the daughter of Elizabeth and Rowland Hassall, was born in Parramatta, New South Wales on 12 December 1799. She was born a year after her parents arrived in Sydney on the Nautilus, after having been Anglican missionaries at Tahiti. She acquired a good education and upbringing, which was unusual for the time and place. She was described by her biographer as inheriting "helpful traits from her mother and father, including their enterprising character, practical skills, compassion and self-determination".

== Marriage ==
One year after they met, Mary Cover Hassall married Rev. Walter Lawry, becoming Mary Cover Lawry. Her husband was a Wesleyan Methodist missionary and the son of Anna and Joseph Lawry of Cornwall, England. He came to Sydney in 1818 aboard a convict ship, Lady Castlereagh . Soon after, he began courting his future bride. Walter's allure was his "ready humour and characteristic sensitivity". The couple married in a triple ceremony on 22 November 1819 with her brothers Samuel and Jonathan and their brides Lucy Mileham and Mary Rouse, respectively. Her father wrote a hymn for the ceremony.

My affairs with my dear Mary are all settled… My heart cleaves to the young lady whom I have chosen for my companion thro’ tribulations; and from her I expect nothing but sweetness and the very best of enjoyments; but the family are Calvinistic Dissenters, which thing annoys me.

— Walter Lawry

Although Rowland Hassall had strong Anglican-Calvinist sympathies, he welcomed Protestant missionaries of differing faiths into the area, and often into his home. Walter was a Wesleyan missionary.

After their marriage, the couple lived on Macquarie Street in Sydney. Their first child, Elizabeth, was born prematurely on 19 August 1820, in the midst of an influenza epidemic. Lawry was sick for days before the delivery. A premature infant was among the most susceptible people to get the pneumonia-like flu. The baby died on 1 September 1820, three days after her grandfather Rowland Hassall died, and she was buried at St John's Cemetery, Parramatta. The Lawrys had three surviving children at the time of Mary's death, Henry, Elizabeth, and Mary Australia.

== Missionary ==
Lawry and her husband performed missionary work together. The first Wesleyan Chapel in Parramatta, located next to their simple "Mission House", was opened in 1821. The construction of the chapel was partially funded by most of Lawry's dowry. Convicts provided the labour. Walter stood his ground for the church to be Wesleyan, although his father-in-law believed that it should be overseen by a body of Anglicans, Congregationalists and Wesleyans. Lawry led the first Sunday school there.

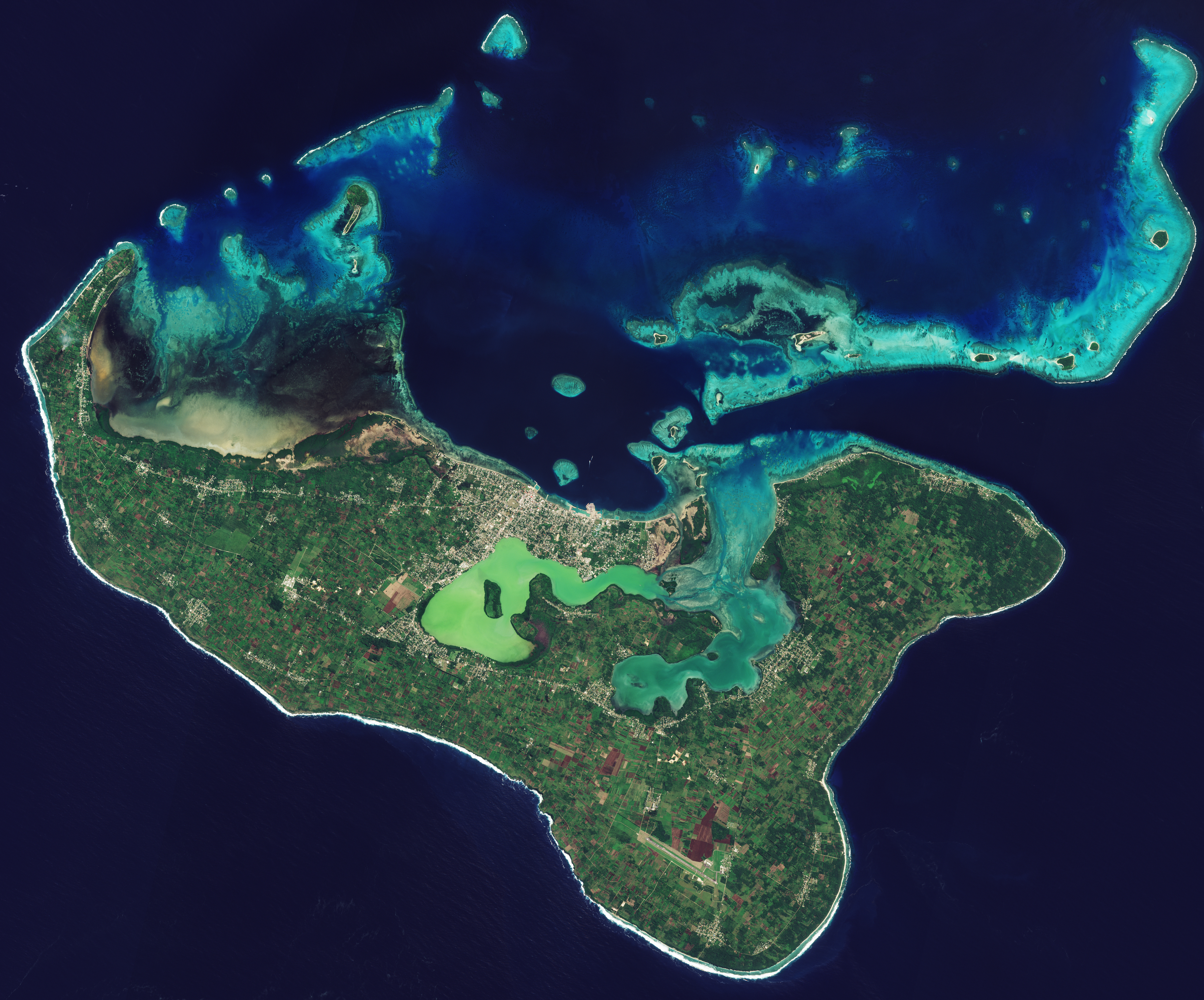
Tongatapu, Main island of the Kingdom of Tonga

They were missionaries from 1822 to 1823 at the "Friendly Islands" in Tongatapu, Tonga. (Note: The couple was in Tonga, which was also considered part of Samoa in the University of Cambridge study.) Lawry, Walter, and their son Henry weathered a difficult journey across the Pacific. Arriving in Tonga, they faced threats, theft, and resistance as well as encounters with Māori war canoes. The pagan rituals were frightening. As was found with other couples who were missionaries in Samoa, women had an easier time relating to indigenous women than the men had with the Tongan men. Lawry carried her child with her to communicate with the Tongan women about folk medicine, female knowledge, and lore. Lawry and other women relied on local women to help them become established in their homes. They were assistants, nursemaids, and guides. They also helped them attain provisions. Women traded in handicrafts, food, and moccasins. The nature of the relationships between the missionary women and the native women helped them develop "a close and easy bond".

I think it may be easier for a woman to be a missionary than for a man. Why? I am able to come to Tonga and bring my work, the shape of my days, with me almost unaltered. The bundle may have been rearranged; a little lumpy in places, but the same elements are still there—wife, mother, housewife . . . a protective shell around me and mine . . . In this tiny area, it is all right to be ourselves.

— Mary Cover Lawry

Men, on the other hand, was concerned about how to subdue and control the native peoples and converting them to Christianity. Men traded in animals and weapons. Walter spent much of his time at home learning the language.

Lawry stated that it was not her job to inspire conversion. According to Chilla Bulbeck, "women were not the explicit purveyors of colonial domination that their husbands were: British menfolk provided the iron of rigid rule and railroad." The biographical fiction book about Mary's life, Currency Lass (1985) by Margaret Reeson, brought to light that missionary women were partners to their husbands, and many women worked "behind the scenes" to bring change to indigenous communities.

Lawry worked quite hard while in Tonga and during their time there, she miscarried a baby. She was pregnant again when they returned to Parramatta in 1823 to tend to Mary's health. She gave birth to Elizabeth in 1824. Walter, born and raised in England, had charges against him by the missionary association because he did not accept a placement at Van Diemen's Land and needed to return to England to address the charges. The four Lawrys left for England during Australian spring of 1824. Lawry and the two children were quite ill during much of the trip. The Lawrys arrived at Portsmouth on New Year's Day of 1825. Lawry became pregnant shortly after arriving in Cornwall, England, where many of Walter's family lived. The Lawry's daughter Mary Australia was born in December 1825. Two weeks later, on Christmas Day 1825, Lawry died as the result of complications of childbirth.

Papers concerning Lawry are held at the National Library of Australia.

== Legacy ==
- She was said to be devoted her life to others and "Not only did she set the benchmark for the love and service displayed by our subsequent female leaders - she did so with undeniable courage."

== See also ==
- Currency lads and lasses

== Bibliography ==
- de Reland, Elizabeth (2018). Lawry : 200th anniversary : Rev. Walter Lawry at Parramatta Mission. Illuminate, Camden Theological Library.
