= David Manton =

Australian Minister

- Born: 5 July 1936 (age 89); Sydney Australia
- Education: Newington College; San Francisco Theological Seminary
- Occupations: Retired Uniting Church in Australia minister Former Moderator of the New South Wales Synod of the UCA
- Spouse: Frances Evelyn (Jones) Manton
- Children: 5
- Website: Design of Arms for David Manton

Edwin David Manton OAM (born 5 July 1936) is a retired Australian minister and former Moderator of the New South Wales Synod of the Uniting Church in Australia.

== Early life ==
Manton was born in Sydney, the third son of Edwin Spencer Manton (b. 1899 - d.1951) and his second wife, Eleanor Elizabeth (Nell) Hunt. He attended Newington College (1949-1953) the school founded by his great-grandfather Rev John Manton and attended by his father and maternal grandfather, Richard Hunt (b. 1852 - d.1929).

== Clerical life ==
Manton was a minister in rural and city congregations of the Methodist Church of Australasia, and Uniting Church, and served on the Board of Missions as associate secretary for home and inland missions in NSW. Manton was awarded his doctorate in ministry from the San Francisco Theological Seminary.

== Appointments ==
- Newington College Council (since 1984)

== Honours ==
- Medal of the Order of Australia (2005) - For service to the community through a range of ministries within the Uniting Church in Australia.

Preceded by Rev Dr Don Evans	Moderator of the NSW Synod; Uniting Church in Australia; September 1998 - September 2000	Succeeded by Mrs Margaret Reeson
