= Rowland Hassall =

England-born Australian missionary and farmer (1768–1820)

- Born: 31 March 1768; Coventry, England, United Kingdom
- Died: 28 August 1820 (aged 52); Parramatta, New South Wales, Australia
- Spouse: Elizabeth Hancox
- Children: Thomas, Samuel, Jonathan, Mary Cover, James, Eliza Cordella, Susannah Marsden, Ann, and Elizabeth
- Parent: James Hassall

Rowland Hassall (31 March 1768 – 28 August 1820), born in England, was a missionary in Tahiti for a short period of time and in New South Wales for the rest of his life. Initially a field preacher, he became a minister. He raised sheep, was a businessman, and became a prosperous land-owner. His son Thomas Hassall established the first Sunday school in Australia, after which Rowland Hassall co-founded the New South Wales Sunday School Institution in 1815.

== England ==
Rowland Hill Hassall, the son of James Hassall, was born in Coventry, England on 31 March 1768. He was named after Rowland Hill, who was his parents' minister. He was able to read and write at a rudimentary level. Like his father, he became a silk weaver, He married Elizabeth Hancox, who plied the same trade. Their first son, Thomas, was born in 1794 and their second son Samuel Otoo was born in 1796.

== Conversion ==
Hassall contracted black measles or cholera and having barely survived the disease, he vowed to serve God. (Note: Assumed to be dead, he was placed in a coffin and he opened his eyes. His brother died during the epidemic.) Hassall and Elizabeth attended the West Orchard Congregational Church and they were 'called under one sermon' given by Rev. George Burder. Hassall was a field preacher for Burder and founded a Sunday school. Inspired by Hassall and other field preachers, Burder wrote the book "Village Sermans".

== Missionary ==
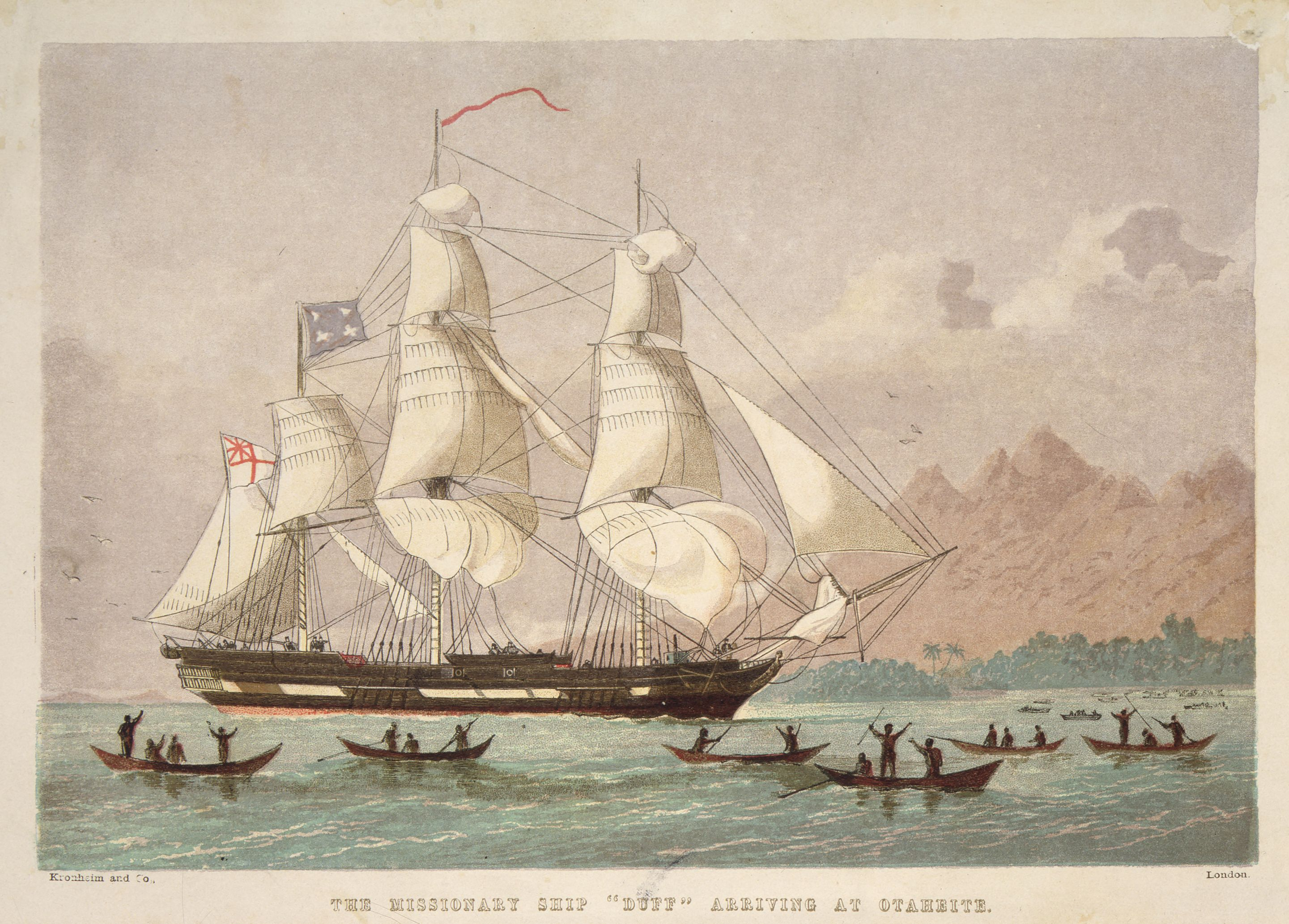
The missionary ship "Duff" arriving in 1797 at Otaheite, lithograph by Kronheim & Co.

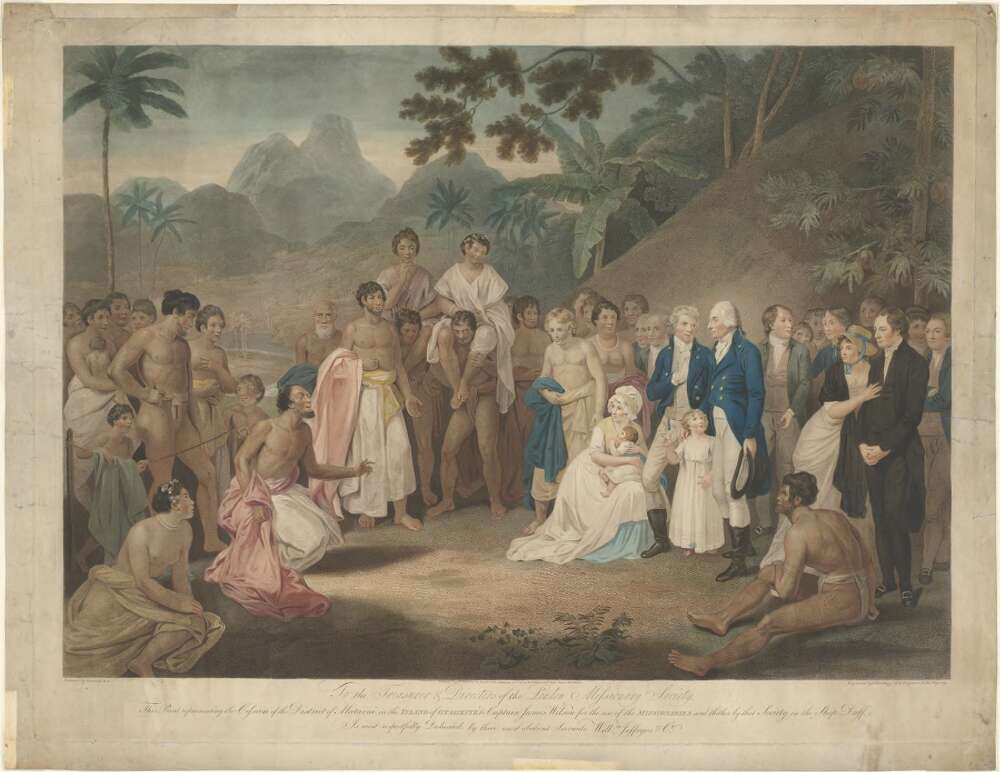
The cession of the district of Matavai in the island of Tahiti to Captain James Wilson for the use of the London Missionary Society. Wife Elizabeth is shown (kneeling).

Hassall joined the London Missionary Society (LMS) as an artisan missionary, having been recommended by Burder, who was a director of LMS. The four Hassalls sailed the Duff to Tahiti in 1796 and arrived on 5 Mar 1797. It was the first ship that sailed LMS missionaries to the South Seas. Hassall worked as a carpenter and a blacksmith. Their son Jonathan was born in Tahiti. Due to unrest with the Tahitians, the Hassalls fled Tahiti in 1798. They travelled with their brother-in-law Rev. James Cover and other missionaries on the Nautilus, arriving in Port Jackson (Sydney) in May 1798. At the time of their arrival, Port Jackson was a small community, with British officers living in seven huts made of wattle and daub with a thatched roof. Supplies arrived only once a year, leaving the inhabitants near starvation at times.

William Henry and James Cover established an itinerant ministry at preaching stations, including Kissing Point and Toongabbie. Hassall was a "Calvinistically-oriented Methodist and Presbyterian itinerant preacher" who rode on horseback to serve these communities. The Hassalls built a house on a plot of land that they were granted seven miles from Port Jackson. They had hired servants, one of whom came across a box with a false bottom hiding £600 (equivalent to £79,778 in 2023) several months after their arrival. Two men broke into their house and threatened their lives if they did not hand over their money. In the struggle, Hassall was "insensible on the floor" and Elizabeth's arm was wounded when the thieves wrestled a sword from Hassall. It took some time for Hassall to heal, but he did not press charges.

In 1800, Hassall took over Cover's position. Hassall raised funds for books and monies for Kissing Point school, which was operated by Matthew Hughes. William Wilberforce was a benefactor. In 1803, Hassall and William Crook were co-ministers at Castle Hill. In 1804, the Hassalls moved to Parramatta and built a house along the Parramatta River, that was used for parish meetings, Christian outreach, and education. It was a base for missionaries who visited the colony on their way to the Pacific islands.

Presbyterian and Calvinistic Methodist people settled at Portland Head on the Hawkesbury. He ministered to them and helped them build a chapel in 1808. He continued to give sermons on Friday and Sunday evenings in Parramatta. He co-founded the New South Wales Sunday School Institution in 1815. He communicated with fellow missionaries throughout his life.

== Businessman ==
Hassall was appointed government storekeeper in September 1800 by Governor Philip Gidley King. He was responsible for managing the stores at Toongabbie and the granary at Parramatta. He held the position for two years until it became apparent that there was ongoing fraudulent activity that Hassall overlooked. He was a sergeant in the Loyal Parramatta Association of Volunteers in March 1804.

Hassall engaged in a number of commercial endeavours. He managed properties and was an agent, ran sheep for himself and other flockmasters, and operated a store in Parramatta. (Note: The store, which was a profitable concern, may have been the first private business in the colony.) He had 1300 acres (526 ha) of land by 1808. He became the superintendent of government stock in 1814. When he died he left a total of 3000 acres (1214 ha) in multiple locations.

== Personal life and death ==
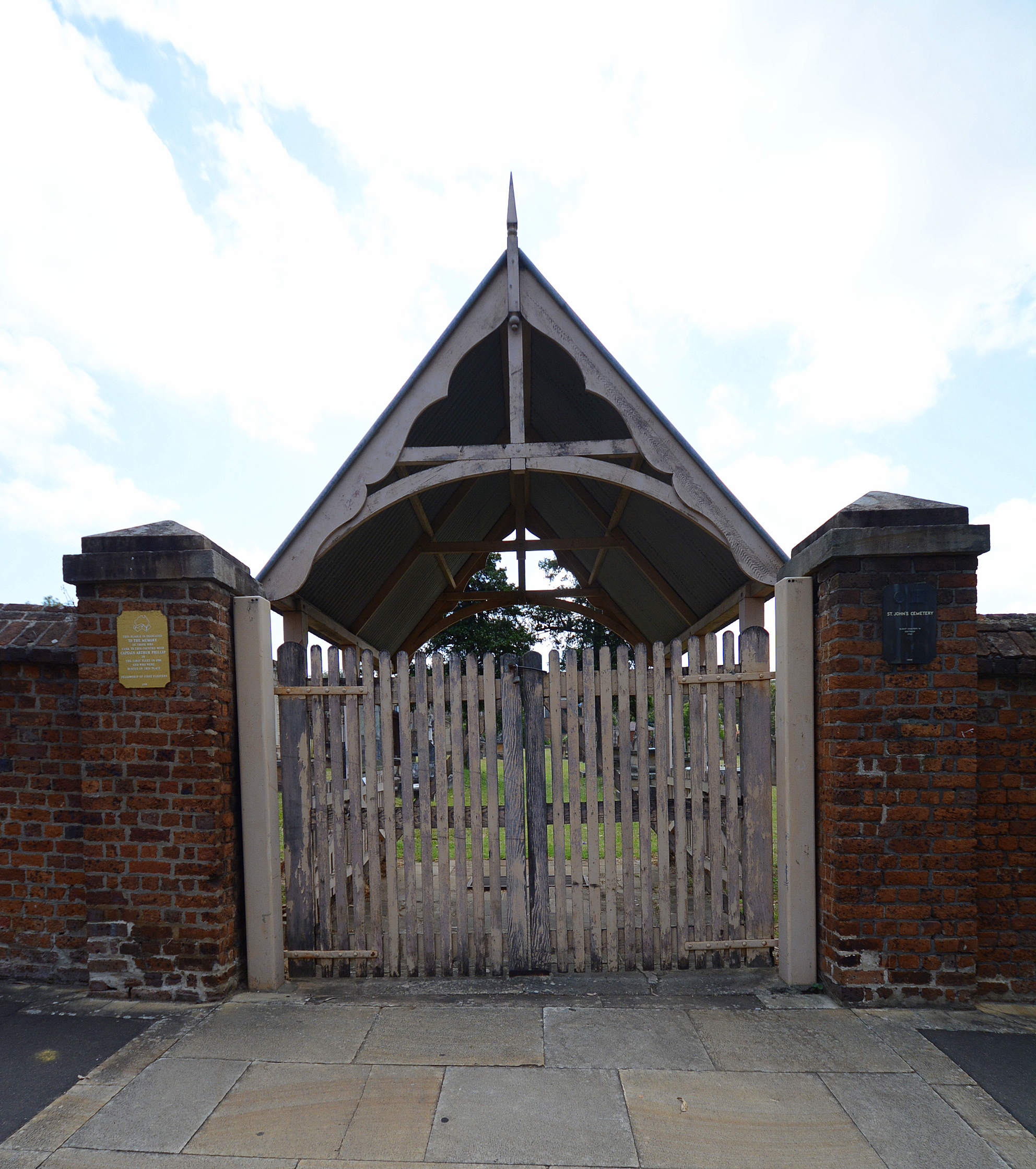
St John's Cemetery, Parramatta

The Hassalls had nine children including Thomas, Samuel, Jonathan, Mary Cover, James, Eliza Cordelia, Susannah Marsden, Ann, and Elizabeth. Thomas opened the first Sunday school in Australia and his siblings were teachers.

Hassall died of influenza on 28 August 1820 at Parramatta (Note: His gravestone states that he died 26 August 1820. The newspaper article about his life states that he died on 30 August 1820.) and was buried at the St John's Cemetery, Parramatta. Elizabeth died on 11 February 1834 at Parramatta.

== Legacy ==
His son-in-law, Rev. Walter Lawry (married to Mary Cover Lawry), said of him upon his death, "His life was upright and his end, peace—a man more than ordinarily beloved by all around him; but most so by his own family, who are proverbially fond of him.

Hassall's life was said to have been a "continued example of religion and piety, extensive benevolence and hospitality", and he had "never lost sight of his original designation as a Missionary, and continued to the latest period of his life zealously to perform the duties of one, by preaching the Gospel in almost all parts of the colony".

He was an ardent correspondent and his letters are "one of the main sources for the early social history of New South Wales." His papers are held by the State Library of New South Wales.

Artifacts from Rowland and Elizabeth are among the collection of the Mitchell Library (part of the State Library of New South Wales), including a painting by Buonarotti of the Hassalls, other missionaries, and King Pōmare II and the Queen of Tahiti. (Note: Mr. and Mrs. Henry, also depicted in the painting, remained in Tahiti after the other missionaries had fled. They were said to have been killed and eaten by the Tahitians.)

== See also ==
- Hassall Grove, New South Wales
- Macquarie Grove
