= Thomas Hassall (priest) =

Anglican clergyman in early colonial Australia

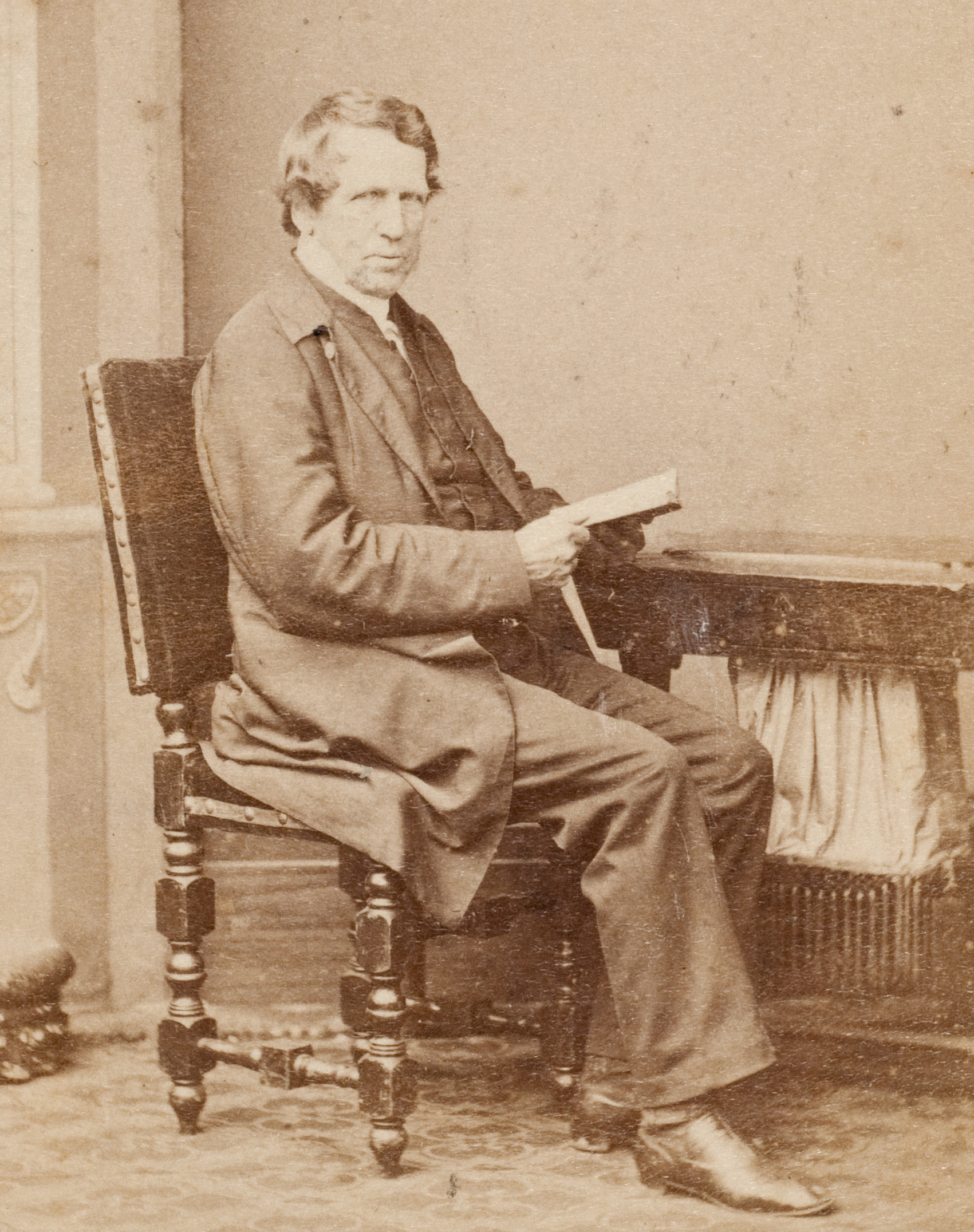
- Portrait of Reverend Thomas Hassall, Australia, ca. 1866
- Born: May 29, 1794; Coventry, England
- Died: March 29, 1868 (aged 73); Cobbitty, New South Wales
- Education: Lampeter College, Wales
- Spouse: Anne Marsden
- Children: 3 sons 5 daughters
- Parent(s): Rowland Hassall and Elizabeth, nee Hancox
- Church: Church of England
- Ordained: 1821

Thomas Hassall (29 May 1794 – 29 March 1868) was an Anglican clergyman and the first Australian candidate for ordination. Hassall opened the first Sunday School in Australia in 1813 in his father's house at Parramatta.

== Early life ==
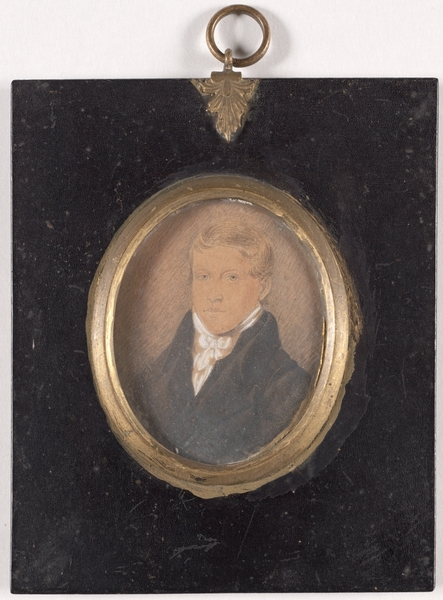
Thomas Hassall, ca. 1818 - portrait a1528138

Thomas Hassall was born in Coventry, London, the eldest son of missionaries Rowland and Elizabeth Hassall. He sailed with them as a three-year-old to Tahiti aboard the ship Duff in 1796 with missionaries approved by the directors of the recently formed London Missionary Society. Fifteen months later the Hassall family with Thomas and younger brother Samuel, sailed to the newly founded settlement of New South Wales, arriving in Sydney on 14 May 1798 aboard Nautilus. The Hassall family settled in Parramatta during which time the missionary's eldest son, Thomas, came to the attention of the Reverend Samuel Marsden. Initially Thomas was employed as a clerk in the offices of Sydney merchant Robert Campbell and afterwards Captain James Birnie. However, Thomas Hassall gained success in establishing the first Sunday school in Australia for children in his father's house at Parramatta, and Marsden recommended the young man enter the ministry.

== Sunday School Movement ==
Thomas Hassall opened up the family home on the corner of George and Charles Street Parramatta to Sunday school classes in May 1813, initially to a small group, including convict children. Thomas requested permission from Marsden to accommodate the school at St John's church Parramatta as numbers continued to grow. There were more than 200 children including Aboriginal children. Teachers included Thomas’ father, Rowland Hassall, and Rev. Marsden's children Ann, Elizabeth and Charles Simeon Marsden. Thomas Hassall then formalised the Sunday school movement with “requirements and rules” established and printed for the guidance of teachers.

== Training for the Ministry in Wales ==
Having resolved to enter the Ministry, Hassall sailed for England in the Kangaroo in 1817, to undergo his training, the first Australian candidate for ordination. Hassall studied at the Diocesan College, Lampeter, Wales under the direction of Principal Rev Dr. Williams. Hassall was ordained deacon by Dr Howley the Bishop of London on 15 April 1821, and ordained priest three months later by the Bishop of Ely in June 1821. Receiving his appointment as Colonial Chaplain, Hassall returned to NSW arriving in Sydney aboard the convict ship Mary in January 1822.

== Life and Ministry in New South Wales ==
=== Parramatta ===
Thomas Hassall took up his position as Rev Marsden's curate at St John's Parramatta, preaching his first Australian sermon there on 3 February 1822. He married Marsden's eldest daughter Anne Marsden on 12 August 1822 and continued as his curate until 1824.

=== Port Macquarie ===
In June 1824 Hassall was appointed chaplain to the penal settlement of Port Macquarie. Rev Marsden corresponded with Governor Sir Thomas Brisbane encouraging the appointment

=== Bathurst ===
In 1826 Hassall was appointed to the Bathurst district. Living on his property Lampeter farm at O’Connell Plains he rode every Sunday to the town of Bathurst to hold Church services, returning in the evening to preach at ‘Salem Chapel’ which he built in close proximity to his residence.

=== Cowpastures ===
In 1827 Hassall was appointed to the new parish of Cowpastures which he described as “Australia beyond Liverpool”. This was to be his centre of operations for the remainder of his life. At this time Hassall purchased Denbigh estate at Cobbitty which became his headquarters. Here be built Heber Chapel in 1828 which served for many years until St Paul's Cobbitty was established in 1842.

Hassall's extensive parish extended as far as Goulburn and Illawarra involving an exhaustive preaching ministry including Cobbitty, Berrima, Bong Bong and Goulburn. He was often referred to as the "galloping parson” and has been described as the first of Australia's ‘bush parsons’.

Gradually from 1838 onwards the large parish was reduced to a more manageable circuit, with Hassall being relieved of Goulburn and Mulgoa. Subdivided into dioceses and parishes, clergy were appointed and churches built.

Thomas Hassall died at Denbigh estate on 29 March 1868. He was survived by his wife, Anne Hassall, née Marsden (1794 – 18 June 1885)

== See also ==
- Eliza Marsden Hassall
- London Missionary Society
- Samuel Marsden
