= Eliza Marsden Hassall =

Lay leader of the Anglican church (1834–1917)

- Born: 2 November 1834; Cobbitty, New South Wales
- Died: 26 December 1917; Coogee, New South Wales
- Venerated in: Anglican Church of Australia
- Feast: 2 January

Eliza Marsden Hassall (2 November 1834 – 26 December 1917) was an Australian lay leader of the Anglican church and a philanthropist. Her father was an Anglican clergyman.

== Life ==
She was born at "Denbigh", in Cobbitty, New South Wales, the seventh of eight children of Thomas Hassall, a colonial minister, and his wife Ann, the eldest daughter of Samuel Marsden. Eliza was educated at home, by her governess and by the tutors of her brothers. She assisted in the Sunday school programs at Heber Chapel, which her father had built for the benefit of the workers at the Denbigh estate, and at St. Paul's Church, in Cobbity, beginning in 1842.

She maintained regular correspondence with the members of her extended family, being particularly interested in her family history. She also became proficient at managing the household of her family, extending to assisting in management of the estate, to the point of learning winemaking. She also helped to minister to the families of the estate's tenants and tradesmen.

With the assistance of her father, she acquired a farm at Bowral, which would later be sold in 1866 for 450 pounds. In time, her elder sisters married. She did not, choosing instead to help her father and eldest brother, Rev. James Hassall, in their ministries, and later in caring for her mother after the death of her father. Following her father's death in 1868, Eliza moved with her mother to Parramatta.

She became involved in promoting missionary activity overseas. By 1855, she had become involved in the work of the British and Foreign Bible Society. Eliza during these years became increasingly pietistic. She is recorded as having told a niece to break off an engagement with a young man, at whatever cost to herself, on the basis of his lacking good character, and as telling a sister-in-law that "the lessons affliction is sent to teach us is to be more sympathetic and forgiving to others.

In July 1880, she helped in the formation of the New South Wales brand of the Young People's Scripture Union, and later became secretary of that group. After the death of her mother in 1885, Hassall helped to form the Church Missionary Association of New South Wales, which was formally started in July 1892.This organization set its own policies and engaged in its own recruitment of missionaries, although its parent group kept the job of placing these missionaries. The next year, Eliza bought a property called "Cluden", at the intersection of Frederick Street and Church Street in Ashfield, New South Wales, near the local Anglican church. After receiving a request from the Church Missionary Association, she established Marsden House (alternately, the Marsden Training Home for Women Missionaries) there, and engaged in the recruitment of new missionaries. The first of these recruits, her niece Amy Isabel Oxley, became a missionary to China in 1896.

Marsden House laid particular emphasis on Biblical studies and geography. Eliza herself was the superintendent of the school and the president of the ladies' fund-raising committee. It proved quite successful, and in 1898 expanded to permit the training of even more missionaries. After a missionary exhibition the following year, Eliza was made an honorary life member of the Church Missionary Society.

== Death and legacy ==
Hassall retired from Marsden House in 1903, and moved to a cottage on Charlotte Street in Ashfield, which she also named "Cluden". Roughly three of every four Australian overseas missionaries by this time were women who Eliza had helped recruit and train. The Deaconess Institute at Redfern took control of Marsden House and continued in the work of training woman missionaries.

Eliza died on 26 December 1917, at Coogee and was buried in the churchyard of St. Paul's Church in Cobbitty. She is commemorated in the Calendar of saints of the Anglican Church of Australia on 2 January.
