= Wicked Campers =

Australian camper van rental company

- Founded: 2000
- Founder: John Webb
- Headquarters: Brisbane, Australia
- Products: Camper van rentals
- Website: www.wickedcampers.com

Wicked Campers is an Australian camper van rental company based in Brisbane, Queensland, Australia. Founded in 2000 by John Webb, the company also has outlets in other parts of Australia, along with New Zealand, together with operations in Europe, South Africa, Japan, and North and South America.

Wicked Campers market their product towards younger drivers and backpackers. Each van features a spray painted design, often featuring pop culture references and slogans, which are often rude and offensive—including statements perceived as misogynistic, anti-environmental, and disrespectful to Indigenous communities. Following moves by various Australian states to outlaw offensive slogans and images on vehicles, notably campervans belonging to Wicked Campers, on 2 August 2019 Federal and State government ministers agreed on a combined approach to deal with the issue.

== Controversies ==
Wicked Campers have continually attracted media attention in Australia and New Zealand for their use of offensive slogans on their painted vans. Between 2008 and 2012 the Australian Advertising Standards Board upheld numerous complaints about offensive slogans or other advertising.

In 2010, according to the Daily Telegraph, the Queensland government released a report saying 90% of Wicked vans in the state were unroadworthy. Wicked took the vans off the road but claimed that the vans were safe. It appears, however, that the number of vans that were taken off the road is a point of contention.

In 2011, various media sources reported that Wicked Campers received criticism from animal rights activists for placing stickers inside their Australian vans with the text "Kangaroos, run the fuckers down." Wicked stated the stickers were to promote road safety and prevent vehicular rollovers.

In November 2011 it was reported that the company trading as Wicked Campers had paid fines of $26,400 for 'misleading advertising' regarding camper van hire fees. According to the Australian Competition & Consumer Commission, the company had 'failed to specify the single total price payable for the campervans and failed to adequately disclose certain mandatory fees and charges'.

In July 2014 a petition opposing their sexist and misogynist slogans attracted over 100,000 signatures and protests in the Australian Senate. After pressure through the media, Wicked issued an apology and committed to removing the offensive slogans. As of April 2016, they have not done so.

The Australian Christian Lobby has campaigned in Queensland and in New South Wales in regards to the wording on Wicked Camper vans.

In December 2016 it was reported that the New Zealand Advertising Standards Authority upheld a number of complaints. Wicked Campers, "did not respond to the complaints board".

In July 2014, following significant public criticism and a widely supported petition, Wicked Campers issued a public apology for the offensive slogans displayed on some of their vehicles. The company stated that it would review its advertising policies, remove insensitive slogans from its fleet within six months, and committed to improving its practices. In subsequent years, media reports have noted a reduction in the use of controversial slogans, indicating that Wicked Campers has taken steps to address earlier concerns.

== Federal and state government responses ==
In November 2016, Premier of Queensland Annastacia Palaszczuk introduced legislation revoking the registration of commercial operators who refuse to remove offensive slogans from their vehicles.

In November 2016, Tasmanian Transport Minister Rene Hidding said that the Government would cancel the registration of vehicles displaying slogans he described as "vile and appalling".

In December 2016, Victorian Minister for Women, Fiona Richardson said, "If we can do something to rid our roads of Wicked Campers, take down advertising that blurs the line between marketing and misogyny and turn the tables on the trolls, we will do it."

In February 2017, a Queensland Parliamentary Committee recommended the legislation that will result in the cancellation of registration of vehicles with offensive slogans or advertisements that contravene advertising standards.

On 2 August 2019, Transport ministers of Federal and all state governments agreed on a national strategy to deal with the issue. On the same day, the Victorian transport minister announced the introduction of new laws which would ban vehicles displaying obscene slogans and images from travelling on Victorian roads.

== Local government responses ==
Numerous caravan and camping parks and businesses pertaining to tourism have stated they will refuse entry to vans carrying offensive slogans. Following community groundswell opposing the wicked slogans that promote rape, indecent sexual behaviour, Indigenous disrespect, harm to native wildlife and other offensive imagery and slogans, the Blue Mountains City Council notified the community on 1 June 2016 that it is looking at various options to ban Wicked Campervans with offensive, misogynistic, racial and degrading slogans and imagery from council managed tourist/caravan parks within the Blue Mountains. Wicked Campers appear to enjoy the free negative promotions of its business that the slogans draw. However, they do not appear to be concerned about the implications on its market, generally young travelers, who may be influenced by these slogans to carry out actions that they would not normally otherwise do.

Ballina Shire Council in NSW, has lobbied State Governments for, "action or legislative changes to ban the inappropriate messages".

== Other responses ==
In April 2015, due to the offensive slogans, Lonely Planet removed Wicked Campers from its listings.

Writing in Australia’s media and marketing journal Mumbrella, its marketing and advertising editor, Simon Canning has said, "Adland can thank Wicked Campers for getting the law involved in ad regulation", with Mumbrella describing Wicked Campers as being Australia’s most out-of-control advertiser.

== Wicked Camper reaction ==
The company mocks both the complainants, and the complaints against it.
