= John Hassall =

John Hassall may refer to:

- John Hassall (musician) (born 1981), English bassist
- John Hassall (illustrator) (1868–1948), English poster artist
- John Hassall, chairman of Sheffield United F.C., an English football club

== See also ==
- Jon Hassall (born 1973), Australian rules footballer
- John Hassell (disambiguation)
