= McCoy, Grove & Atkinson =

Australian commercial law firm

- Major practice areas: Corporate and commercial
- Date founded: 1887
- Founder: Richard McCloy
- Company type: Partnership
- Dissolved: 2014

McCoy, Grove & Atkinson was an Australian commercial law firm. It was established in 1887 in Marrickville, New South Wales, by Richard McCoy and soon after moved to Castlereagh Street, Sydney. The name of McCoy, Grove & Atkinson was adopted in 1929 and in 1956 the firm of Fitzhardinge, Son & Yeomans was subsumed into the partnership. The firm closed on 30 June 2014.

== Notable alumni ==
The following were once partners at McCoy, Grove & Atkinson:–

- Richard McCloy (1863–1942); an alderman at Marrickville from 1894 to 1896, serving as mayor for the final year of his term. In 1901 he was elected to the New South Wales Legislative Assembly as the Liberal member for Marrickville. He served until his retirement in 1910.
- Rupert Grove (1906–1982); prominent Methodist and Uniting Church layman. In the progression towards the union of the Congregational, Methodist and Presbyterian churches in Australia, Grove made a decisive impact.
- Richard Hansford; former councillor and chairman of Newington College Council.
