= Uniting Church in Australia, Synod of New South Wales and the ACT =

Uniting Church in Australia, Synod of NSW & ACT
- Classification: Protestantism
- Orientation: Calvinism and Methodism
- Polity: Presbyterianism, Connexionalism and Congregationalism
- Moderator: Rev. Faaimata Havea Hiliau
- Distinct fellowships: Uniting Aboriginal and Islander Christian Congress
- Origin: 1977; 49 years ago
- Merger of: Methodist Church of Australasia, Presbyterian Church of Australia, Congregational Union of Australia
- Congregations: 500
- Members: 50,000
- Official website: nswact.uca.org.au

The Synod of New South Wales and the ACT is a regional council of the Uniting Church in Australia having responsibility for the congregations and presbyteries in New South Wales and the Australian Capital Territory. From its creation in 1977 until 29 March 2008, the Synod had the shorter title of Synod of New South Wales.

The current and 29th Moderator of the Synod is Rev. Faaimata (Mata) Havea Hiliau, who succeeded Rev. Simon Hansford in September 2023.

== Presbyteries ==
There were previously 13 presbyteries in the Synod of New South Wales and the ACT (regional councils with responsibility for oversight of congregations in their area), listed below. These were replaced over the period 2025-2027 with three presbyteries;

- Northern
- Central
- Southern

The previous presbyteries were;

- Canberra Region Presbytery
- Far North Coast Presbytery
- Georges River Presbytery
- Illawarra Presbytery
- Korean Presbytery
- Macquarie Darling Presbytery
- Mid North Coast Presbytery
- New England North West Presbytery
- Parramatta Nepean Presbytery
- Riverina Presbytery
- Sydney Central Coast Presbytery
- Sydney Presbytery
- The Hunter Presbytery

The regional council of the Uniting Aboriginal and Islander Christian Congress (UAICC) also functions similarly to a presbytery.

== Moderators ==
date	name
2023–2026	Rev. Faaimata (Mata) Havea Hiliau
2017–2023	Rev. Simon Hansford
2014–2017	Rev. Myung Hwa Park
2011–2014	Rev. Dr. Brian Brown
2007–2011	Rev. Niall Reid
2004–2007	Mr Jim Mein AM
2002–2004	Rev. Alistair Christie
2000–2002	Mrs Margaret Reeson
1998–2000	Rev. Dr. David Manton OAM
1996–1998	Rev. Dr. Donald Evans
1995–1996	Rev. Dean Drayton
1994–1995	Rev. Ken Cornwall
1993–1994	Rev. Shirley Maddox
1992–1993	Rev. Tony Chi
1989–1992	Mr Bruce Irvine
1988–1989	Rev. Dr. Clyde Dominish AM
1987–1988	Rev. Dr. Geoffrey Barnes
1986–1987	Rev. Dr. William Ives
1985–1986	Miss Freda Whitlam AM
1984–1985	Rev. Dr. Gordon Dicker
1983–1984	Rev. John Mallison OAM
1982–1983	Rev. Keith Brooks
1981–1982	Rev. Malcolm McLeod
1980–1981	Rev. Graham Hardy
1979–1980	Rev. Peter Davis
1978–1979	Rev. Ronald Sparks
1977–1978	Mrs Lilian Wells
