= Joe Hassall =

English footballer

Personal information
- Full name: Joshua Hassall
- Date of birth: November 1871
- Place of birth: Wednesfield, England
- Date of death: 1895 (aged 23–24)
- Position: Goalkeeper

Senior career*
Years	Team	Apps	(Gls)
1889–1890	Birmingham St George's		
1890–1891	Stafford Rangers		
1891–1892	Heath Moor		
1893–1895	Wolverhampton Wanderers	48	(0)
Total		48	(0)
- * Club domestic league appearances and goals

Joshua Hassall (November 1871 – 1895) was an English footballer who played in the Football League for Wolverhampton Wanderers.
