= Electoral results for the district of Goulburn =

Election results for Goulburn, New South Wales, Australia

Goulburn, an electoral district of the Legislative Assembly in the Australian state of New South Wales, has had two incarnations, from 1859 until 1991 and from 2007 to the present.

== Members for Goulburn ==
First incarnation (1859–1991)
Election	Member	Party				
1859	William Roberts	None				
1860	Charles Walsh	None				
1861 by	Maurice Alexander	None				
1864	Maurice Alexander	None				
1869	Maurice Alexander	None				
1872	William Teece	None				
1874	William Teece	None				
1877	William Teece	None				
1880	William Teece	None				
1882	William Teece	None				
1885	William Teece	None				
1887	William Teece	Free Trade				
1890 by	Cecil Teece	Free Trade				
1891	Leslie Hollis	Labor				
1894	Leslie Hollis	Free Trade				
1895	Leslie Hollis	Free Trade				
1898	James Ashton	Free Trade				
1901	James Ashton	Liberal Reform				
1903	James Ashton	Liberal Reform				
1907	Gus James	Liberal Reform				
1910	Gus James	Liberal Reform				
1913	Gus James	Liberal Reform				
1917	Gus James	Nationalist	Member	Party	Member	Party
1920	Gus James	Nationalist	Thomas Rutledge	Progressive	Jack Bailey	Labor
1920 apt	William Millard	Nationalist	Thomas Rutledge	Progressive	Jack Bailey	Labor
1921 apt	John Perkins	Nationalist	Thomas Rutledge	Progressive	Jack Bailey	Labor
1922	John Perkins	Nationalist	Thomas Rutledge	Progressive	Jack Bailey	Labor
1925	John Perkins	Nationalist	Paddy Stokes	Labor	Jack Tully	Labor
1926 apt	Henry Bate	Nationalist	Paddy Stokes	Labor	Jack Tully	Labor
1927	Jack Tully	Labor				
1930	Jack Tully	Labor				
1932	Peter Loughlin	United Australia				
1935	Jack Tully	Labor (NSW)				
1938	Jack Tully	Labor				
1941	Jack Tully	Labor				
1944	Jack Tully	Labor				
1946 by	Laurie Tully	Labor				
1947	Laurie Tully	Labor				
1950	Laurie Tully	Labor				
1953	Laurie Tully	Labor				
1956	Laurie Tully	Labor				
1959	Laurie Tully	Labor				
1962	Laurie Tully	Labor				
1965	Ron Brewer	Country				
1968	Ron Brewer	Country				
1971	Ron Brewer	Country				
1973	Ron Brewer	Country				
1974 by	Ron Brewer	Country				
1976	Ron Brewer	Country				
1978	Ron Brewer	National Country				
1981	Ron Brewer	National Country				
1984	Robert Webster	National				
1988	Robert Webster	National				
Second incarnation (2007–present)
Election	Member	Party				
2007	Pru Goward	Liberal				
2011	Pru Goward	Liberal				
2015	Pru Goward	Liberal				
2019	Wendy Tuckerman	Liberal				
2023	Wendy Tuckerman	Liberal				

== Election results ==
=== Elections in the 2020s ===
==== 2023 ====
2023 New South Wales state election: Goulburn
Party	Candidate	Votes	%	±%
Liberal	Wendy Tuckerman	20,737	40.8	+2.1
Labor	Michael Pilbrow	18,028	35.5	+5.2
Shooters, Fishers, Farmers	Andrew Wood	6,891	13.6	+4.3
Greens	John Olsen	3,587	7.1	−1.2
Sustainable Australia	Margaret Logan	1,532	3.0	+3.0
Total formal votes		50,775	97.0	+0.1
Informal votes		1,553	3.0	−0.1
Turnout		52,328	90.8	+0.5
Two-party-preferred result
Liberal	Wendy Tuckerman	23,185	51.3	−1.8
Labor	Michael Pilbrow	22,015	48.7	+1.8
Liberal hold		Swing	−1.8	

=== Elections in the 2010s ===
==== 2019 ====
2019 New South Wales state election: Goulburn
Party	Candidate	Votes	%	±%
Liberal	Wendy Tuckerman	19,957	39.09	−9.66
Labor	Ursula Stephens	15,355	30.07	−4.20
Shooters, Fishers, Farmers	Andy Wood	4,847	9.49	+9.49
One Nation	Richard Orchard	4,723	9.25	+9.25
Greens	Saan Ecker	4,100	8.03	+0.17
Animal Justice	Tracey Keenan	1,247	2.44	+2.44
Liberal Democrats	Dean McCrae	828	1.62	+1.62
Total formal votes		51,057	96.93	−0.32
Informal votes		1,616	3.07	+0.32
Turnout		52,673	91.50	−1.24
Two-party-preferred result
Liberal	Wendy Tuckerman	22,539	53.74	−2.89
Labor	Ursula Stephens	19,398	46.26	+2.89
Liberal hold		Swing	−2.89	

==== 2015 ====
2015 New South Wales state election: Goulburn
Party	Candidate	Votes	%	±%
Liberal	Pru Goward	23,725	48.7	+9.7
Labor	Ursula Stephens	16,681	34.3	+18.5
Greens	Iain Fyfe	3,827	7.9	−2.1
Outdoor Recreation	Wal Ashton	2,552	5.2	+5.2
Christian Democrats	Adrian Van Der Byl	1,196	2.5	−0.5
No Land Tax	Stephen Fitzpatrick	692	1.4	+1.4
Total formal votes		48,673	97.3	+0.7
Informal votes		1,373	2.7	−0.7
Turnout		50,046	92.7	+2.5
Two-party-preferred result
Liberal	Pru Goward	25,138	56.6	−20.2
Labor	Ursula Stephens	19,248	43.4	+20.2
Liberal hold		Swing	−20.2	

==== 2011 ====
2011 New South Wales state election: Goulburn
Party	Candidate	Votes	%	±%
Liberal	Pru Goward	27,828	61.3	+21.5
Labor	Crystal Validakis	6,690	14.7	−7.8
Hatton's Independent Team	Robert Parker	4,962	10.9	+10.9
Greens	Maree Byrne	4,341	9.6	+3.0
Christian Democrats	Adrian Van Der Byl	1,551	3.4	−0.8
Total formal votes		45,372	96.8	−1.0
Informal votes		1,508	3.2	+1.0
Turnout		46,880	93.7	0.0
Two-party-preferred result
Liberal	Pru Goward	30,540	76.6	+18.0
Labor	Crystal Validakis	9,312	23.4	−18.0
Liberal hold		Swing	+18.0	

=== Elections in the 2000s ===
==== 2007 ====
2007 New South Wales state election: Goulburn
Party	Candidate	Votes	%	±%
Liberal	Pru Goward	17,115	39.9	+7.8
Independent	Paul Stephenson	10,603	24.7	+24.7
Labor	Rob Parker	9,695	22.6	−16.4
Greens	Bill Dorman	2,834	6.6	−0.7
Christian Democrats	Geoff Peet	1,817	4.2	+3.6
AAFI	David Hughes	860	2.0	+2.0
Total formal votes		42,924	97.8	−0.4
Informal votes		958	2.2	+0.4
Turnout		43,882	93.7	
Notional two-party-preferred count
Liberal	Pru Goward	20,162	58.6	+4.1
Labor	Rob Parker	14,249	41.4	−4.1
Two-candidate-preferred result
Liberal	Pru Goward	18,769	51.3	−3.2
Independent	Paul Stephenson	17,807	48.7	+48.7
Liberal hold		Swing	−3.2	

==== 1991–2007 ====
District abolished

=== Elections in the 1980s ===
==== 1988 ====
1988 New South Wales state election: Goulburn
Party	Candidate	Votes	%	±%
National	Robert Webster	20,606	69.3	+16.8
Labor	Roger Lucas	9,144	30.7	−13.2
Total formal votes		29,750	97.6	−1.2
Informal votes		745	2.4	+1.2
Turnout		30,495	95.0	
National hold		Swing	+15.2	

==== 1984 ====
1984 New South Wales state election: Goulburn
Party	Candidate	Votes	%	±%
National	Robert Webster	15,089	49.7	−2.1
Labor	Bob Stephens	13,652	45.0	−3.2
Independent	Miriam Naughton	1,369	4.5	+4.5
Independent	Ronald Sarina	222	0.7	+0.7
Total formal votes		30,332	98.5	+0.2
Informal votes		451	1.5	−0.2
Turnout		30,783	94.1	+1.2
Two-party-preferred result
National	Robert Webster		52.3	+0.4
Labor	Bob Stephens		47.7	−0.4
National hold		Swing	+0.4	

==== 1981 ====
1981 New South Wales state election: Goulburn
Party	Candidate	Votes	%	±%
National Country	Ron Brewer	14,999	51.8	
Labor	Robert Stephens	13,926	48.1	
Total formal votes		28,925	98.3	
Informal votes		509	1.7	
Turnout		29,434	92.9	
National Country hold		Swing	−0.5	

=== Elections in the 1970s ===
==== 1978 ====
1978 New South Wales state election: Goulburn
Party	Candidate	Votes	%	±%
National Country	Ron Brewer	11,353	49.8	−4.8
Labor	Brian Lulham	10,945	48.1	+2.7
Democrats	Gregory Butler	479	2.1	+2.1
Total formal votes		22,777	98.8	−0.3
Informal votes		268	1.2	+0.3
Turnout		23,045	95.3	+0.1
Two-party-preferred result
National Country	Ron Brewer	11,592	50.9	−3.7
Labor	Brian Lulham	11,185	49.1	+3.7
National Country hold		Swing	−3.7	

==== 1976 ====
1976 New South Wales state election: Goulburn
Party	Candidate	Votes	%	±%
Country	Ron Brewer	12,091	54.6	−9.4
Labor	Brian Lulham	10,044	45.4	+14.6
Total formal votes		22,135	99.1	+0.8
Informal votes		202	0.9	−0.8
Turnout		22,337	95.2	+0.2
Country hold		Swing	−13.3	

==== 1974 by-election ====
1974 Goulburn by-election
Party	Candidate	Votes	%	±%
Country	Ron Brewer	12,600	61.9	−2.1
Labor	Dermid McDermott	7,770	38.1	+7.3
Total formal votes		20,370	99.4	+1.1
Informal votes		133	0.6	−1.1
Turnout		20,503	89.9	−5.1
Country hold		Swing	−6.0 (Note: compared to the two-party-preferred result for the 1973 Goulburn election.)	

Ron Brewer (Country) resigned to unsuccessfully contest the 1974 federal election for Eden-Monaro.

==== 1973 ====
1973 New South Wales state election: Goulburn
Party	Candidate	Votes	%	±%
Country	Ron Brewer	13,386	64.0	+2.0
Labor	Noel Lane	6,453	30.8	−7.2
Democratic Labor	Raymond Albrighton	773	3.7	+3.7
Independent	Evan Treharne	311	1.5	+1.5
Total formal votes		20,923	98.3	
Informal votes		354	1.7	
Turnout		21,277	95.0	
Two-party-preferred result
Country	Ron Brewer	14,215	67.9	+5.9
Labor	Noel Lane	6,708	32.1	−5.9
Country hold		Swing	+5.9	

==== 1971 ====
1971 New South Wales state election: Goulburn
Party	Candidate	Votes	%	±%
Country	Ron Brewer	11,882	62.0	−2.9
Labor	Norman Barnwell	7,267	38.0	+6.2
Total formal votes		19,149	98.9	
Informal votes		206	1.1	
Turnout		19,355	95.9	
Country hold		Swing	−4.3	

=== Elections in the 1960s ===
==== 1968 ====
1968 New South Wales state election: Goulburn
Party	Candidate	Votes	%	±%
Country	Ron Brewer	11,940	64.9	+36.5
Labor	John Longhurst	5,853	31.8	−14.0
Democratic Labor	Kenneth Clancy	598	3.3	+3.3
Total formal votes		18,391	99.0	
Informal votes		191	1.0	
Turnout		18,582	95.7	
Two-party-preferred result
Country	Ron Brewer	12,418	67.5	+14.8
Labor	John Longhurst	5,973	32.5	−14.8
Country hold		Swing	+14.8	

==== 1965 ====
1965 New South Wales state election: Goulburn
Party	Candidate	Votes	%	±%
Labor	Ernest McDermott	7,630	45.8	−5.6
Country	Ron Brewer	4,718	28.3	+28.3
Liberal	Brian Keating	4,313	25.9	−19.3
Total formal votes		16,661	98.7	−0.7
Informal votes		222	1.3	+0.7
Turnout		16,883	96.7	−0.1
Two-party-preferred result
Country	Ron Brewer	8,589	51.5	+51.5
Labor	Ernest McDermott	8,072	48.5	−3.6
Country gain from Labor		Swing	+3.6	

==== 1962 ====
1962 New South Wales state election: Goulburn
Party	Candidate	Votes	%	±%
Labor	Laurie Tully	8,869	51.4	+1.5
Liberal	George Ashley	7,793	45.2	+1.7
Democratic Labor	Reginald Andrews	579	3.4	−3.2
Total formal votes		17,241	99.4	
Informal votes		100	0.6	
Turnout		17,341	96.8	
Two-party-preferred result
Labor	Laurie Tully	8,985	52.1	+0.2
Liberal	George Ashley	8,256	47.9	−0.2
Labor hold		Swing	+0.2	

=== Elections in the 1950s ===
==== 1959 ====
1959 New South Wales state election: Goulburn
Party	Candidate	Votes	%	±%
Labor	Laurie Tully	8,135	49.9	
Liberal	Ray Bladwell	7,105	43.5	
Democratic Labor	Charles O'Brien	1,073	6.6	
Total formal votes		16,313	99.1	
Informal votes		142	0.9	
Turnout		16,455	95.6	
Two-party-preferred result
Labor	Laurie Tully	8,468	51.9	
Liberal	Ray Bladwell	7,845	48.1	
Labor hold		Swing		

==== 1956 ====
1956 New South Wales state election: Goulburn
Party	Candidate	Votes	%	±%
Labor	Laurie Tully	8,666	52.9	−9.7
Liberal	Ray Bladwell	7,724	47.1	+9.7
Total formal votes		16,390	99.4	+1.2
Informal votes		97	0.6	−1.2
Turnout		16,487	95.2	−0.7
Labor hold		Swing	−9.7	

==== 1953 ====
1953 New South Wales state election: Goulburn
Party	Candidate	Votes	%	±%
Labor	Laurie Tully	10,155	62.6	
Liberal	Pat Osborne	6,069	37.4	
Total formal votes		16,224	98.2	
Informal votes		290	1.8	
Turnout		16,514	95.9	
Labor hold		Swing		

==== 1950 ====
1950 New South Wales state election: Goulburn
Party	Candidate	Votes	%	±%
Labor	Laurie Tully	8,691	55.3	
Liberal	Hubert O'Connell	7,029	44.7	
Total formal votes		15,720	98.7	
Informal votes		212	1.3	
Turnout		15,932	95.0	
Labor hold		Swing		

=== Elections in the 1940s ===
==== 1947 ====
1947 New South Wales state election: Goulburn
Party	Candidate	Votes	%	±%
Labor	Laurie Tully	8,019	52.6	−47.4
Liberal	Ray Bladwell (Note: Jointly endorsed by the Liberal and Country parties.)	7,240	47.4	+47.4
Total formal votes		15,259	99.3	
Informal votes		112	0.7	
Turnout		15,371	96.8	
Labor hold		Swing	N/A	

==== 1946 by-election ====
1946 Goulburn by-election Saturday 1 June
Party	Candidate	Votes	%	±%
Labor	Laurie Tully	7,184	51.7	
Country	Ray Bladwell	4,910	35.4	
Liberal	Dick Hollis	696	12.9	
Total formal votes		13,890	99.2	
Informal votes		119	0.8	
Turnout		14,009	88.4	
Labor hold		Swing	N/A	

Jack Tully (Labor) resigned to be appointed Agent-General for New South Wales in London.

==== 1944 ====
1944 New South Wales state election: Goulburn
Party	Candidate	Votes	%	±%
Labor	Jack Tully	unopposed		
Labor hold				

==== 1941 ====
1941 New South Wales state election: Goulburn
Party	Candidate	Votes	%	±%
Labor	Jack Tully	8,917	60.5	
United Australia	George Ardill	5,520	37.4	
Independent	Cecil Gray	306	2.1	
Total formal votes		14,743	98.8	
Informal votes		171	1.2	
Turnout		14,914	94.9	
Labor hold		Swing		

=== Elections in the 1930s ===
==== 1938 ====
1938 New South Wales state election: Goulburn
Party	Candidate	Votes	%	±%
Labor	Jack Tully	6,284	51.3	+0.8
United Australia	Peter Loughlin	3,200	26.1	−23.4
Country	Frederick Davies	2,702	22.0	+22.0
Independent	Robert Tatham	66	0.5	+0.5
Total formal votes		12,252	98.2	+0.6
Informal votes		221	1.8	−0.6
Turnout		12,473	97.7	+0.1
Labor hold		Swing	N/A	

- Preferences were not distributed.

==== 1935 ====
1935 New South Wales state election: Goulburn
Party	Candidate	Votes	%	±%
Labor (NSW)	Jack Tully	6,300	50.5	+5.4
United Australia	Peter Loughlin (defeated)	6,167	49.5	+13.9
Total formal votes		12,467	98.8	−0.2
Informal votes		151	1.2	+0.2
Turnout		12,618	97.6	+0.3
Labor (NSW) gain from United Australia		Swing	+4.3	

==== 1932 ====
1932 New South Wales state election: Goulburn
Party	Candidate	Votes	%	±%
Labor (NSW)	Jack Tully	5,439	45.1	−15.4
United Australia	Peter Loughlin	4,300	35.6	−3.6
Country	John Garry	2,329	19.3	+19.3
Total formal votes		12,068	99.0	+0.4
Informal votes		119	1.0	−0.4
Turnout		12,187	97.3	+1.4
Two-party-preferred result
United Australia	Peter Loughlin	6,489	53.8	+14.6
Labor (NSW)	Jack Tully	5,579	46.2	−14.6
United Australia gain from Labor (NSW)		Swing	+14.6	

==== 1930 ====
1930 New South Wales state election: Goulburn
Party	Candidate	Votes	%	±%
Labor	Jack Tully	7,093	60.5	
Nationalist	Joseph Hamlet	4,588	39.2	
Communist	George Hill	35	0.3	
Total formal votes		11,716	98.6	
Informal votes		164	1.4	
Turnout		11,880	95.9	
Labor hold		Swing		

=== Elections in the 1920s ===
==== 1927 ====
This section is an excerpt from 1927 New South Wales state election § Goulburn

1927 New South Wales state election: Goulburn
Party	Candidate	Votes	%	±%
Labor	Jack Tully	6,853	48.4	
Nationalist	John Garry	6,230	44.0	
Independent	Archibald Turnbull	1,087	7.7	
Total formal votes		14,170	98.9	
Informal votes		157	1.1	
Turnout		14,327	87.2	
Two-party-preferred result
Labor	Jack Tully	7,026	50.6	
Nationalist	John Garry	6,849	49.4	
Labor win		(new seat)		

==== 1926 appointment ====
John Perkins resigned to successfully contest the federal seat of Eden-Monaro at the 1926 Eden-Monaro by-election. Henry Bate was the next unsuccessful Nationalist candidate at the 1925 election and took his seat on 21 January 1926.

==== 1925 ====
This section is an excerpt from 1925 New South Wales state election § Goulburn

1925 New South Wales state election: Goulburn
Party	Candidate	Votes	%	±%
Quota		6,490		
Labor	Paddy Stokes (elected 2)	7,078	27.3	+27.3
Labor	Jack Tully (elected 3)	4,295	16.6	+16.6
Labor	Clarence Steele	685	2.6	+2.6
Nationalist	John Perkins (elected 1)	7,665	29.5	+11.6
Nationalist	Henry Bate	1,815	7.0	−5.0
Nationalist	Percy Hollis	616	2.4	+2.4
Progressive	William Hedges	1,496	5.8	+5.8
Progressive	William Bluett	1,238	4.8	+4.8
Progressive	Adam Singer	1,034	4.0	+4.0
Young Australia	Denis O'Leary	34	0.1	+0.1
Total formal votes		25,956	97.0	+1.0
Informal votes		794	3.0	−1.0
Turnout		26,750	69.1	−0.5
Party total votes
Labor		12,058	46.5	+9.2
Nationalist		10,096	38.9	+9.0
Progressive		3,768	14.5	−18.0
Young Australia		34	0.1	+0.1

==== 1922 ====
This section is an excerpt from 1922 New South Wales state election § Goulburn

1922 New South Wales state election: Goulburn
Party	Candidate	Votes	%	±%
Quota		6,427		
Labor	John Bailey (elected 1)	7,329	28.5	−7.1
Labor	Frank Morgan	2,080	8.1	+6.0
Labor	Thomas Butler	176	0.7	+0.7
Progressive	Thomas Rutledge (elected 3)	3,707	14.4	+2.7
Progressive	John O'Reilly	2,820	11.0	+11.0
Progressive	Edward Halliday	1,821	7.1	+7.1
Nationalist	John Perkins (elected 2)	4,607	17.9	+17.9
Nationalist	Henry Bate	3,078	12.0	+12.0
Independent	Francis Grogan	76	0.3	+0.3
Independent	Samuel Rose	12	0.1	+0.1
Total formal votes		25,706	96.0	+5.3
Informal votes		1,059	4.0	−5.3
Turnout		26,765	69.6	+11.3
Party total votes
Labor		9,585	37.3	−1.4
Progressive		8,348	32.5	+11.2
Nationalist		7,685	29.9	+0.5
Independent	Francis Grogan	76	0.3	+0.3
Independent	Samuel Rose	12	0.1	+0.1

==== 1921 appointment ====
William Millard died in October 1921. As there were no further unsuccessful Nationalist candidates, the Parliamentary Elections (Casual Vacancies) Act was amended to allow his replacement by another Nationalist supporter. John Perkins was appointed taking his seat on 22 November 1921.

==== 1920 appointment ====
Gus James was appointed an Acting Judge of the Supreme Court of New South Wales from 21 September 1920. Between 1920 and 1927 the Legislative Assembly was elected using a form of proportional representation with multi-member seats and a single transferable vote (modified Hare-Clark). There was confusion at the time as to the process to be used to fill the vacancy. When George Beeby resigned on 9 August 1920, in accordance with the practice prior to 1920, the Speaker of the Legislative Assembly issued a writ of election requiring a by-election to be conducted, however the Chief Electoral Officer said he couldn't do so under then law at the time and that a by-election would be contrary to the principle of proportional representation. The vacancies were left unfilled until the Parliament passed the Parliamentary Elections (Casual Vacancies) Act on 10 December 1920, so that casual vacancies were filled by the next unsuccessful candidate on the incumbent member's party list. William Millard was the only unsuccessful Nationalist candidate at the 1920 election and took his seat on 15 December 1920.

==== 1920 ====
This section is an excerpt from 1920 New South Wales state election § Goulburn

1920 New South Wales state election: Goulburn
Party	Candidate	Votes	%	±%
Quota		5,039		
Labor	John Bailey (elected 1)	7,175	35.6	
Labor	Frank Morgan	413	2.1	
Labor	Richard Macdonald	214	1.1	
Nationalist	Augustus James (elected 2)	3,981	19.7	
Nationalist	William Millard (defeated)	1,943	9.6	
Progressive	Thomas Rutledge (elected 3)	2,361	11.7	
Progressive	Patrick Bourke	779	3.9	
Progressive	William Tomkins	736	3.6	
Independent	Percy Evans	2,023	10.0	
Independent	John Brogan	62	0.3	
Independent	Francis Grogan	39	0.2	
Total formal votes		20,152	90.7	
Informal votes		2,061	9.3	
Turnout		22,213	58.3	
Party total votes
Labor		7,802	38.7	
Nationalist		5,924	29.4	
Progressive		4,302	21.3	
Independent	Percy Evans	2,023	10.0	
Independent	John Brogan	62	0.3	
Independent	Francis Grogan	39	0.2	

=== Elections in the 1910s ===
==== 1917 ====
This section is an excerpt from 1917 New South Wales state election § Goulburn

1917 New South Wales state election: Goulburn
Party	Candidate	Votes	%	±%
Nationalist	Augustus James	4,290	51.4	−2.4
Labor	Con Hogan	4,055	48.6	+2.4
Total formal votes		8,345	99.3	+1.8
Informal votes		56	0.7	−1.8
Turnout		8,401	65.1	−7.6
Nationalist hold		Swing	−2.4	

==== 1913 ====
This section is an excerpt from 1913 New South Wales state election § Goulburn

1913 New South Wales state election: Goulburn
Party	Candidate	Votes	%	±%
Liberal Reform	Augustus James	4,444	53.8	
Labor	Chester Davies	3,810	46.2	
Total formal votes		8,254	97.5	
Informal votes		213	2.5	
Turnout		8,467	72.7	
Liberal Reform hold				

==== 1910 ====
This section is an excerpt from 1910 New South Wales state election § Goulburn

1910 New South Wales state election: Goulburn
Party	Candidate	Votes	%	±%
Liberal Reform	Augustus James	3,467	57.7	
Labour	Percy Hollis	2,542	42.3	
Total formal votes		6,009	99.2	
Informal votes		49	0.8	
Turnout		6,058	72.6	
Liberal Reform hold				

=== Elections in the 1900s ===
==== 1907 ====
This section is an excerpt from 1907 New South Wales state election § Goulburn

1907 New South Wales state election: Goulburn
Party	Candidate	Votes	%	±%
Liberal Reform	Augustus James	2,237	42.5	
Labour	Richard Holloway	1,553	29.5	
Independent	Thomas Rose	1,267	24.1	
Independent	James Gegg	208	4.0	
Total formal votes		5,265	98.4	
Informal votes		84	1.6	
Turnout		5,349	67.9	
Liberal Reform hold				

==== 1904 ====
This section is an excerpt from 1904 New South Wales state election § Goulburn

1904 New South Wales state election: Goulburn
Party	Candidate	Votes	%	±%
Liberal Reform	James Ashton	2,480	56.2	
Labour	Hector Lamond	1,931	43.8	
Total formal votes		4,411	99.4	
Informal votes		28	0.6	
Turnout		4,439	59.0	
Liberal Reform hold				

Goulburn was expanded to include part of the abolished seat of Argyle. The member for Goulburn was James Ashton (Liberal Reform). The member for Argyle was Thomas Rose (Liberal Reform) who unsuccessfully contested Belubula.

==== 1901 ====
This section is an excerpt from 1901 New South Wales state election § Goulburn

1901 New South Wales state election: Goulburn
Party	Candidate	Votes	%	±%
Liberal Reform	James Ashton	947	63.1	+0.8
Labour	James Toomey	554	36.9	
Total formal votes		1,501	99.5	−0.2
Informal votes		8	0.5	+0.2
Turnout		1,509	59.6	−2.7
Liberal Reform hold				

=== Elections in the 1890s ===
==== 1898 ====
This section is an excerpt from 1898 New South Wales colonial election § Goulburn

1898 New South Wales colonial election: Goulburn
Party	Candidate	Votes	%	±%
Free Trade	James Ashton	842	62.3	
National Federal	Arthur Barrett	509	37.7	
Total formal votes		1,351	99.7	
Informal votes		4	0.3	
Turnout		1,355	62.3	
Free Trade hold				

==== 1895 ====
This section is an excerpt from 1895 New South Wales colonial election § Goulburn

1895 New South Wales colonial election: Goulburn
Party	Candidate	Votes	%	±%
Free Trade	Leslie Hollis	917	71.2	
Protectionist	Arthur Barrett	371	28.8	
Total formal votes		1,288	99.1	
Informal votes		12	0.9	
Turnout		1,300	65.5	
Free Trade hold				

==== 1894 ====
This section is an excerpt from 1894 New South Wales colonial election § Goulburn

1894 New South Wales colonial election: Goulburn
Party	Candidate	Votes	%	±%
Free Trade	Leslie Hollis	1,115	67.8	
Protectionist	Arthur Barrett	432	26.3	
Ind. Free Trade	Edward Ball	98	6.0	
Total formal votes		1,645	98.9	
Informal votes		19	1.1	
Turnout		1,664	82.5	
Member changed to Free Trade from Labour				

==== 1891 ====
This section is an excerpt from 1891 New South Wales colonial election § Goulburn

1891 New South Wales colonial election: Goulburn Wednesday 17 June
Party	Candidate	Votes	%	±%
Labour	Leslie Hollis (elected)	823	47.9	
Free Trade	Frederick Furner	431	25.1	
Protectionist	Albert Lansdowne	396	23.0	
Labour	Aiden Doyle	69	4.0	
Total formal votes		1,719	98.5	
Informal votes		26	1.5	
Turnout		1,745	68.4	
Labour gain from Free Trade				

==== 1890 by-election ====
1890 Goulburn by-election Saturday 16 August
Party	Candidate	Votes	%	±%
Free Trade	Cecil Teece (elected)	952	57.8	
Protectionist	Henry Gannon	696	42.2	
Total formal votes		1,648	97.5	
Informal votes		43	2.5	
Turnout		1,691	66.6	
Free Trade hold				

William Teece (Free Trade) died.

=== Elections in the 1880s ===
==== 1889 ====
This section is an excerpt from 1889 New South Wales colonial election § Goulburn

1889 New South Wales colonial election: Goulburn Saturday 2 February
Party	Candidate	Votes	%	±%
Free Trade	William Teece (elected)	889	58.6	
Protectionist	John Osborne	629	41.4	
Total formal votes		1,518	99.0	
Informal votes		15	1.0	
Turnout		1,533	66.1	
Free Trade hold				

==== 1887 ====
This section is an excerpt from 1887 New South Wales colonial election § Goulburn

1887 New South Wales colonial election: Goulburn Thursday 3 February
Party	Candidate	Votes	%	±%
Free Trade	William Teece (re-elected)	unopposed		

==== 1885 ====
This section is an excerpt from 1885 New South Wales colonial election § Goulburn

1885 New South Wales colonial election: Goulburn Tuesday 27 October
Candidate	Votes	%
William Teece (re-elected)	unopposed	

==== 1882 ====
This section is an excerpt from 1882 New South Wales colonial election § Goulburn

1882 New South Wales colonial election: Goulburn Friday 1 December
Candidate	Votes	%
William Teece (re-elected)	unopposed	

==== 1880 ====
This section is an excerpt from 1880 New South Wales colonial election § Goulburn

1880 New South Wales colonial election: Goulburn Thursday 18 November
Candidate	Votes	%
William Teece (re-elected)	unopposed	

=== Elections in the 1870s ===
==== 1877 ====
This section is an excerpt from 1877 New South Wales colonial election § Goulburn

1877 New South Wales colonial election: Goulburn Friday 26 October
Candidate	Votes	%
William Teece (re-elected)	400	62.8
Frederick Horn	237	37.2
Total formal votes	637	97.7
Informal votes	15	2.3
Turnout	652	65.7

==== 1874 ====
This section is an excerpt from 1874-75 New South Wales colonial election § Goulburn

1874–75 New South Wales colonial election: Goulburn Tuesday 22 December 1874
Candidate	Votes	%
William Teece (re-elected)	unopposed	

==== 1872 ====
This section is an excerpt from 1872 New South Wales colonial election § Goulburn

1872 New South Wales colonial election: Goulburn Tuesday 5 March
Candidate	Votes	%
William Teece (elected)	372	64.8
Maurice Alexander (defeated)	202	35.2
Total formal votes	574	100.0
Informal votes	0	0.0
Turnout	578	66.1

=== Elections in the 1860s ===
==== 1869 ====
This section is an excerpt from 1869-70 New South Wales colonial election § Goulburn

1869–70 New South Wales colonial election: Goulburn Tuesday 14 December 1869
Candidate	Votes	%
Maurice Alexander (re-elected)	unopposed	

==== 1864 ====
This section is an excerpt from 1864–65 New South Wales colonial election § Goulburn

1864–65 New South Wales colonial election: Goulburn Wednesday 7 December 1864
Candidate	Votes	%
Maurice Alexander (re-elected)	278	61.6
Phillip Dignam	172	38.1
Henry Sibley	1	0.2
Total formal votes	451	98.0
Informal votes	9	2.0
Turnout	460	67.6

==== 1861 by-election ====
1861 Goulburn by-election Thursday 13 June
Candidate	Votes	%
Maurice Alexander (elected)	207	76.6
Peter Faucett	78	27.4
Total formal votes	285	95.6
Informal votes	13	4.4
Turnout	298	42.9

==== 1860 ====
This section is an excerpt from 1860 New South Wales colonial election § Goulburn

1860 New South Wales colonial election: Goulburn Friday 7 December
Candidate	Votes	%
Charles Walsh (elected)	unopposed	

The sitting member was William Roberts who unsuccessfully contested Canterbury.

=== Elections in the 1850s ===
==== 1859 ====
This section is an excerpt from 1859 New South Wales colonial election § Goulburn

1859 New South Wales colonial election: Goulburn Tuesday 14 June
Candidate	Votes	%
William Roberts (elected)	198	57.9
Richard Driver	144	42.1
Total formal votes	342	100.0
Informal votes	0	0.0
Turnout	342	68.3
