= 1946 Goulburn state by-election =

Election result for Goulburn, New South Wales, Australia

A by-election was held for the New South Wales Legislative Assembly electorate of Goulburn on 1 June 1946 because of the resignation of Jack Tully (Labor) to be appointed Agent-General for New South Wales in London.

== Dates ==
Date	Event
9 May 1946	Jack Tully resigned.
13 May 1946	Writ of election issued by the Speaker of the Legislative Assembly and close of electoral rolls.
17 May 1946	Nominations
1 June 1946	Polling day
22 June 1946	Return of writ

== Candidates ==
- Ray Bladwell, the Country Party candidate, was a local grazier and wool broker. This was his first election campaign and he would unsuccessfully stand for Goulburn in 1947, 1956 and 1959.
- Dick Hollis, the Liberal party candidate, was the Mayor of Goulburn and nephew of the former member Dr Leslie Hollis.
- Laurie Tully, the Labor Party candidate, a son of the former member, was educated at St Patrick's College, Goulburn, former public servant, and barrister.

== Results ==
1946 Goulburn by-election Saturday 1 June
Party	Candidate	Votes	%	±%
Labor	Laurie Tully	7,184	51.7	
Country	Ray Bladwell	4,910	35.4	
Liberal	Dick Hollis	696	12.9	
Total formal votes		13,890	99.2	
Informal votes		119	0.8	
Turnout		14,009	88.4	
Labor hold		Swing	N/A	

== See also ==
- Electoral results for the district of Goulburn
- List of New South Wales state by-elections
