= 1861 Goulburn colonial by-election =

By-election in New South Wales, Australia

A by-election was held for the New South Wales Legislative Assembly electorate of Goulburn on 13 June 1861 because of the resignation of Charles Walsh. Walsh stated that he had been elected to support the Land Bills, which would open up the free selection of Crown land, and the Legislative Council Bill which would replace the nominated council with an elected body. These bills had not been passed by the Legislative Council and the Premier Charles Cowper had arranged for 21 new members to be appointed to the council. Walsh stated that as the bills "will be carried through both branches of the legislature, and become the law of the land" he therefore resigned as the tasks had been achieved.

It is unclear when Walsh wrote the letter, because on 10 May 1861, before the new members had been sworn in, Sir William Burton the President of the Legislative Council, announced his resignation and left the chambers, followed by the 13 members of the opposition. Under the standing orders of the council in the absence of the President or the Chairman of Committees, George Allen, the council was adjourned until the next sitting day. As there was no further sitting day before the council was prorogued on 13 May 1861 the bills were not passed.

== Dates ==
Date	Event
14 May 1861	Charles Walsh resigned.
20 May 1861	Writ of election issued by the Speaker of the Legislative Assembly.
10 June 1861	Nominations
13 June 1861	Polling day
24 June 1861	Return of writ

== Results ==
1861 Goulburn by-election Thursday 13 June
Candidate	Votes	%
Maurice Alexander (elected)	207	76.6
Peter Faucett	78	27.4
Total formal votes	285	95.6
Informal votes	13	4.4
Turnout	298	42.9

== Aftermath ==
The Robertson Land Acts were ultimately passed by both houses and became law in October 1861. The Legislative Council Bill was not passed and the Council did not become a directly elected body until after the 1978 referendum.

== See also ==
- Electoral results for the district of Goulburn
- List of New South Wales state by-elections
