= 1974 Goulburn state by-election =

By-election in New South Wales, Australia

A by-election was held for the New South Wales Legislative Assembly electorate of Goulburn on 20 July 1974 because Country Party member Ron Brewer resigned to contest the 1974 federal election for Eden-Monaro. Brewer was defeated by 146 votes, and re-contested Goulburn.

== Dates ==
Date	Event
11 April 1974	The Governor-General of Australia dissolved the Australian Senate and House of Representatives.
13 April 1974	Ron Brewer resigned from the Legislative Assembly.
18 May 1974	Polling day for the 1974 Australian federal election.
21 June 1974	Writ of election issued by the Speaker of the Legislative Assembly and close of electoral rolls.
27 June 1974	Nominations
20 July 1974	Polling day
2 August 1974	Return of writ

== Candidates ==
- Dermid McDermott, the Labor Party candidate, was the son of the Mayor of Goulburn. This was the only time he would contest a Legistaive Assembly election.
- Ron Brewer, the Country Party candidate, was the former member recontesting the seat.

== Results ==
1974 Goulburn by-election
Party	Candidate	Votes	%	±%
Country	Ron Brewer	12,600	61.9	−2.1
Labor	Dermid McDermott	7,770	38.1	+7.3
Total formal votes		20,370	99.4	+1.1
Informal votes		133	0.6	−1.1
Turnout		20,503	89.9	−5.1
Country hold		Swing	−6.0 (Note: compared to the two-party-preferred result for the 1973 Goulburn election.)	

== See also ==
- Electoral results for the district of Goulburn
- List of New South Wales state by-elections
