= Electoral results for the district of Moruya =

Election results for state seat of Moruya, New South Wales, Australia

Moruya, an electoral district of the Legislative Assembly in the Australian state of New South Wales was created in 1894 and abolished in 1904.

Election	Member	Party
1894	William Millard	Free Trade
1895	William Millard	Free Trade
1898	William Millard	Free Trade
1901	William Millard	Liberal Reform

== Election results ==
=== Elections in the 1900s ===
==== 1901 ====
1901 New South Wales state election: Moruya
Party	Candidate	Votes	%	±%
Liberal Reform	William Millard	956	65.6	+12.5
Independent	Joynton Smith	440	30.2	
Progressive	Theophilus Cox	62	4.3	−42.1
Total formal votes		1,458	99.6	+0.5
Informal votes		6	0.4	−0.5
Turnout		1,464	70.6	−2.2
Liberal Reform hold				

=== Elections in the 1890s ===
==== 1898 ====
1898 New South Wales colonial election: Moruya
Party	Candidate	Votes	%	±%
Free Trade	William Millard	812	53.0	
National Federal	Albert Chapman	709	46.3	
Independent	John Brogan	10	0.7	
Total formal votes		1,531	99.1	
Informal votes		14	0.9	
Turnout		1,545	72.8	
Free Trade hold				

==== 1895 ====
1895 New South Wales colonial election: Moruya
Party	Candidate	Votes	%	±%
Free Trade	William Millard	733	56.8	
Protectionist	William Boot	557	43.2	
Total formal votes		1,290	99.6	
Informal votes		5	0.4	
Turnout		1,295	71.7	
Free Trade hold				

==== 1894 ====
1894 New South Wales colonial election: Moruya
Party	Candidate	Votes	%	±%
Free Trade	William Millard	708	44.4	
Protectionist	Henry Clarke	448	28.1	
Ind. Protectionist	William Boot	339	21.3	
Ind. Protectionist	John Brogan	49	3.1	
Ind. Protectionist	John Roseby	41	2.6	
Ind. Free Trade	Thomas Garrard	10	0.6	
Total formal votes		1,595	98.8	
Informal votes		19	1.2	
Turnout		1,614	83.5	
Free Trade win		(new seat)		
