= 1890 Goulburn colonial by-election =

By-election in New South Wales, Australia

A by-election was held for the New South Wales Legislative Assembly electorate of Goulburn on 16 August 1890 because of the death of William Teece (Free Trade).

== Dates ==
Date	Event
3 August 1890	William Teece died.
6 August 1890	Writ of election issued by the Speaker of the Legislative Assembly and close of electoral rolls.
14 August 1890	Nominations
16 August 1890	Polling day
26 August 1890	Return of writ

== Candidates ==
- Henry Gannon was the son of John Gannon, the former member for Argyle, a solicitor like his father. He was also a Goulburn alderman and former Mayor of Goulburn. Gannon was endorsed by the Golbourn Protection Union. While he described himself as a protectionist, when he was asked "would it not have been better for you to come out under the auspices of the freetrade party?" Gannon's answer was "very likely". This was Gannon's first experience standing for Parliament, and he subsequently was an unsuccessful Free Trade candidate at the 1894 election for Argyle. In 1897, he ostensibly went on holiday to Fiji, but in fact fled to the United States after misappropriating nearly £15,000 of client's money.
- Cecil Teece, representing the Free Trade Party, was a barrister based in Goulburn and the brother of William. He had attended school with Gannon and described him as an intimate personal friend. This was the only occasion on which Teece stood for Parliament.

The Goulburn Evening Penny Post described the election as a magnificent triumph for free trade and a crushing defeat for protection. Antony Green lists both candidates as independents, stating "neither candidate seemed particularly committed to Free Trade or Protection, the contest being one between two local identities."

== Results ==
1890 Goulburn by-election Saturday 16 August
Party	Candidate	Votes	%	±%
Free Trade	Cecil Teece (elected)	952	57.8	
Protectionist	Henry Gannon	696	42.2	
Total formal votes		1,648	97.5	
Informal votes		43	2.5	
Turnout		1,691	66.6	
Free Trade hold				

== See also ==
- Electoral results for the district of Goulburn
- List of New South Wales state by-elections
