= Thomas Lloyd Forster Rutledge =

Australian politician

Thomas Lloyd Forster Rutledge (11 January 1889 – 13 August 1958) was an Australian politician.

He was born at Goulburn to grazier William Forster Rutledge and Jane (Jean), née Morphy. After attending King's College at Goulburn and St Paul's College at the University of Sydney, where he studied mechanical and civil engineering, he became a jackeroo on his father's station near Bungendore in 1910; by 1918 he owned the property. From 1914 to 1918 he served in Egypt and Gallipoli, being invalided to Malta and England. He rose to the rank of lieutenant colonel and commanded the 7th Light Horse Regiment, and was mentioned in dispatches twice. After his return he served as a Progressive member of the New South Wales Legislative Assembly for Goulburn from 1920 to 1925. He was active in graziers' associations after his defeat. On 29 October 1935 he married Helen Stephen, with whom he had three children. Rutledge died in 1958 in Sydney.

New South Wales Legislative Assembly
Preceded by Augustus James	Member for Goulburn; 1920–1925; Served alongside: Bailey, Millard/Perkins	Succeeded by Paddy Stokes; Jack Tully
