= John Harold Mostyn =

Australian mayor and rugby league administrator (1887–1956)

Jack Mostyn
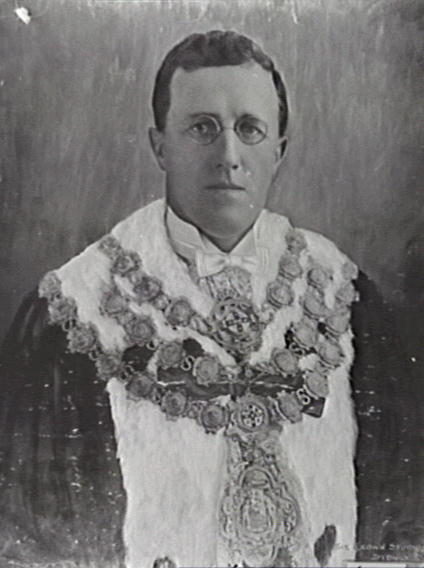

55th Lord Mayor of Sydney
- In office 1 January 1927 – 3 January 1928
- Deputy: Frank Green
- Preceded by: Patrick Vincent Stokes
- Succeeded by: Council dismissed

Alderman of the City of Sydney for Camperdown Ward
- In office 1 December 1924 – 3 January 1928 Serving with Ernest Charles O'Dea
- Preceded by: Charles Mallett; David Gilpin
- Succeeded by: Council dismissed

Personal details
- Born: 1 January 1887 Orange, Colony of New South Wales
- Died: 9 July 1956 (aged 69) Rockdale, New South Wales, Australia
- Resting place: Woronora Memorial Park
- Party: Australian Labor Party (NSW Branch)
- Spouse(s): Laura Champley (b.1887–m.1910–d.1972)

John Harold Mostyn (1887 – 9 July 1956) was the 55th Lord Mayor of Sydney and a rugby league administrator.

== Early life and background ==
Jack Mostyn was born at Orange, New South Wales in 1887 and was an electrician by trade.

== Political career ==
Mostyn was elected as an Alderman of the City of Sydney for Camperdown Ward for the Australian Labor Party in 1924. In 1927 he became Lord Mayor of Sydney. He left office in early 1928, with the dismissal of the City of Sydney and its replacement by a board of commissioners.

== NSW Rugby League ==
Mostyn became the president of the St George District Rugby League Football Club in 1938 and stayed in that role for eight years until 1944, when he lost a ballot for re-election. He was president during the club's first premiership win in 1941. Mostyn was also the St. George Dragons delegate to the NSWRFL for many years.

== Later life ==
A long time resident of Carlton, New South Wales, Jack Mostyn died on 9 July 1956, age 69. He was later buried at Woronora Cemetery, Sutherland, New South Wales.

Civic offices
Preceded by Patrick Vincent Stokes	Lord Mayor of Sydney; 1927 – 1928	Succeeded by Edmund Patrick Fleming; John Garlick; Henry Edgar Morton as Commissioners
Sporting positions
Preceded by Arthur William Yager	President of the St George District Rugby League Football Club; 1938 – 1944	Succeeded by Clem Madden
