= New South Wales Club building =

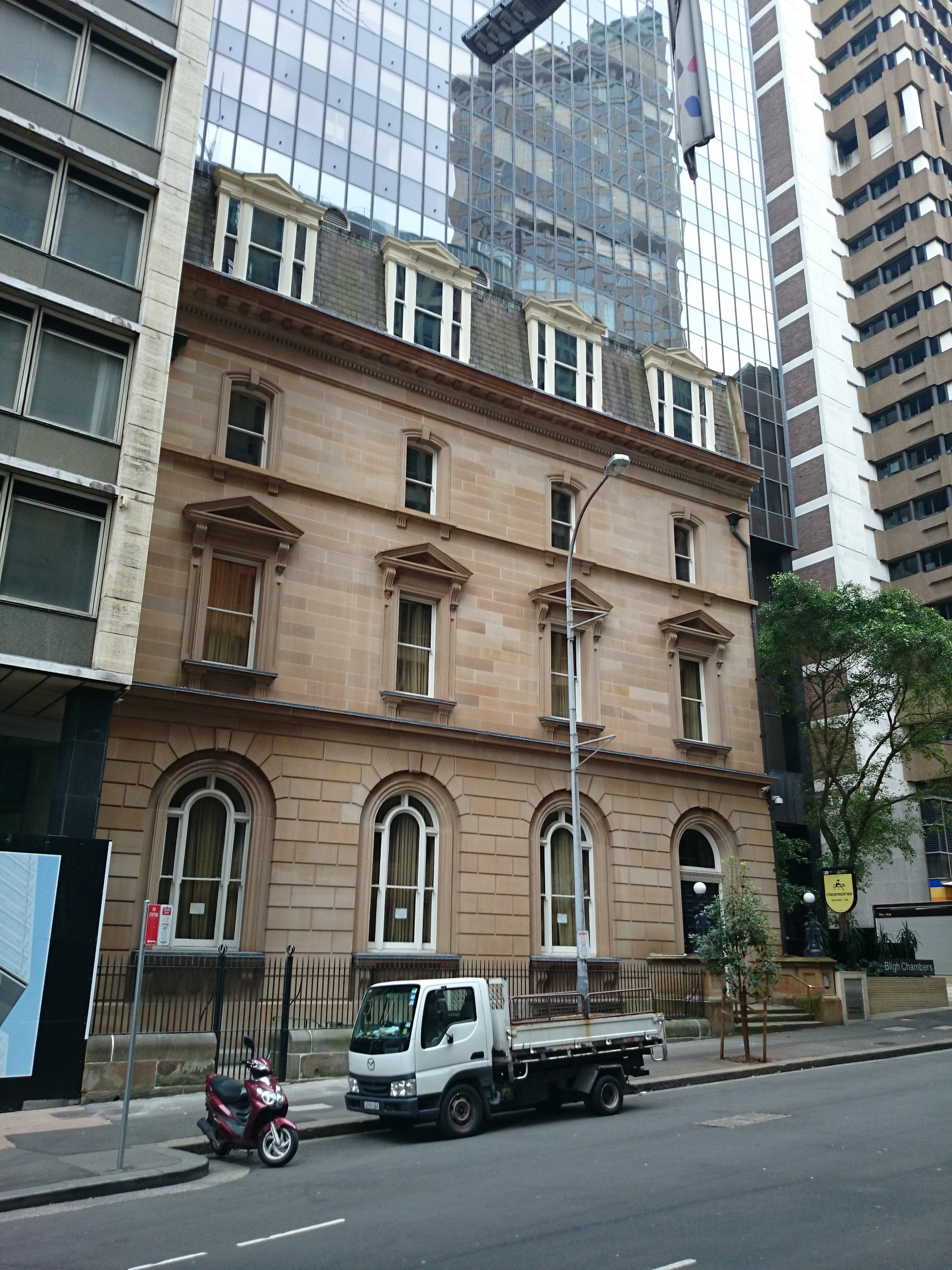

- Location within Sydney Location within Australia
- 33.8656°S 151.2101°E
- Location: 31 Bligh Street, Sydney central business district, City of Sydney, New South Wales, Australia

History
- Built: 1886–1887

Site notes
- Architect: William Wardell

New South Wales Heritage Register
- Official name: NSW Club House Building
- Type: State heritage (built)
- Designated: 2 April 1999
- Reference no.: 145
- Type: Community Club/ Clubhouse
- Category: Community Facilities
- Builders: John Try

New South Wales Club building is a heritage-listed former clubhouse and now offices located at 31 Bligh Street, in the Sydney central business district, in the City of Sydney local government area of New South Wales, Australia. It was designed by William Wardell and built from 1886 to 1887 by John Try. It housed the New South Wales Club from 1886 until the club's amalgamation with the Australian Club in 1969. It was then sold and the two rear wings demolished in 1973 before the surviving front portion was converted to offices. It was added to the New South Wales State Heritage Register on 2 April 1999.

== History ==
The New South Wales Club was conceived on 16 March 1883 and for its premises a block of land measuring 20 metres (67 ft) was bought with frontages to both O'Connell and Bligh Streets. At the club's first general meeting on 1 October 1883, the NSW Club appointed the architect William Wardell to design the building. The purchase of the land cost the Club £18,000, with the tender to John Try costing £15,800. To allay these costs, the O'Connell Street frontage was sold for £15,000.

The clubhouse was opened in 1886, though construction concluded a year later. At the inaugural dinner on 20 January 1886, the Club crest appeared for the first time: an oval girdle enclosing the cross, lions and stars with the motto "Sic Fortis Etruria Crevit" translated as "Thus Etruria grew strong". The club served elaborate dinners and with Lord Carrington, the Governor of New South Wales and the Patron of the club dining there on the 14 October 1890. Other well-known members of the NSW Club included Sydney Burdekin, Richard Teece, Sir Samuel Hordern, Sir Marcus Clarke and Sir William Spooner.

The Club's history reflects the changing demands of time, though it appears that the Club changed only when it had to. The staff ceased dressing in livery in 1943 due to the rationing of clothes and the basement was converted into a Ladies' Annexe for female members in 1965, with a separate entrance below-ground. Most of the changes to the building till the late 1960s were internal with the exception of the 1916 addition of an extra mansard-roofed floor to create more space and later housing billiard and card rooms and additional bedrooms.

The NSW Club was affiliated with other existing clubs of the time. For example, in 1922 it provided honorary membership to members of the Union Club during alterations to its building. In early 1969 the NSW Club announced its amalgamation with the Australian Club. The Bligh Street building was then sold for $3.7 million to Capital and Counties (Aust) Pty Ltd and a year later, in 1971, the building was classified "A" by the National Trust of Australia with the preservation of the front portion of the building deemed "most desirable".

By late 1972, an arrangement was made between Capital and Counties, the National Trust and Gordon Barton on behalf of IPEC Investments whereby Capital and Counties would lease the front of the Club building to the National Trust which would then lease it to IPEC Investments. Capital and Counties nominally leased the building to the Trust at one dollar per year, with the City of Sydney offering Capital and Counties an incentive by giving a bonus plot ratio which allowed additional floors for its intended office block site as compensation for the additional cost of preserving the original club building. The demolished wings and rear would be used by Capital and Counties as high-rise offices and in its deal with IPEC, the Savoy Theatre became available for demolition to give the new offices street access. Under the agreement the National Trust leased the front portion of the Club to IPEC for a period of 80 years with one of the conditions being that internal and external alterations acquire the Trust's approval.

In early 1973 demolition of the rear portion of the club building commenced to make way for the new 25 Bligh Street. Ipec-Tjuringa engaged McConnel Smith and Johnson as architects to the site to restore the remaining front portion of the building and by 1978 the restoration had been completed.

The saving of the club building was a first of the National Trust's efforts in negotiation with property owners to preserve important historic buildings under the procedures set out in the City of Sydney Strategic Plan. The President of the Trust at the time, Wyatt said that he hoped that the arrangements negotiated for the NSW building would serve as a model for the future.

Although Barton had intended the building to be used as office, it was vacant for some years before former Prime Minister Paul Keating occupied its offices in 1996.

== Description ==
The New South Wales Club building is of the Italian palazzo style and is said to have been modelled on London's Travellers Club. For the NSW Club, Wardell designed a main three-story block extending across the full width of the Bligh Street frontage, with two wings at the rear of this central block which were demolished in the 1970s. The western ends of these wings were joined by a single storey block topped with a decorative sky lighted roof. At the northern and southern ends, extending towards O'Connell Street was a grassed courtyard, featuring a small fountain.

The principal entrance to the club-house is from Bligh Street, the frontage of which is constructed in Pyrmont stone. The entrance is approached by a flight of stairs and lined with cast-iron lamp standards, leading to a spacious hall on the ground floor. The NSW Club building is marked by high ceilings and tall windows; the windows being semi circular headed on this floor. The ground floor's entrance hall and original dining room contain elaborate joinery and marble chimney pieces and is further distinguished by its richly painted and stencilled decorative scheme on its walls and ceilings. This latter finding was through restoration efforts of the 1970s which found stencilled decoration on the main ground floor with bands at several levels along with gilded cornices and ceiling roses. In Wardell's original dining room, the walls were a combination of greens, creams and terra cotta in six individual friezes above a brown dado, with sill level emphasized by linking stripes. The entrance hall and the grand dining room had ceilings hand painted in gold, red and brown ochres and spatially the dining room dominated the floor with a comfortable 46 feet by 24 feet in length. The entrance hall had a porter's station, and retains its marble floor edging and a multicoloured arched screen and apart from the hall and dining room the ground floor also included two billiard rooms and a smoking room which opened through a veranda into the courtyard.

The entrance hall of the ground floor led through a wide cedar staircase to the first floor which mainly consisted of a large reading room, a card room and a private dining room. This floor, while being less elaborate than the ground floor contains remnants of embossed wallpaper of importance and has triangular pedimented windows. The windows on the second floor are smaller than the first floor windows and are arched headed. Because of the demolition of the rear wings the bedrooms on the upper floors of the servants no longer exist and it is the ground floor which has remained the most intact out of all the floors.

== Heritage listing ==
The remnant building is of significance as the sole surviving example of a nineteenth-century Sydney gentlemen's club, then an important and influential institution in Victorian colonial society in Australia.

The remnant building is of significance as a surviving, albeit altered, example of the works of the Victorian-era architect, William Wilkinson Wardell. The restrained classical elegance of its original Bligh Street facade is influenced by Italian Renaissance palazzo. Behind the facade are spacious Victorian-era and Federation-era rooms, all with high ceilings and tall windows overlooking Bligh Street. These rooms contain elaborate joinery and marble chimney pieces, and a rich, masculine, painted and stencilled decorative scheme on the walls and ceilings, with remnants of embossed wallpaper of importance.

The remnant building is also of significance because it demonstrates, by means of its surviving form, fabric and finishes the evolution of building conservation during the 1970s.

NSW Club building was listed on the New South Wales State Heritage Register on 2 April 1999 having satisfied the following criteria.

The place is important in demonstrating the course, or pattern, of cultural or natural history in New South Wales.

The NSW Club building is significant because of its 88-year-long association with the NSW Club, commencing in the latter years of the 19th century. This exclusive club, one of a number of similar gentlemen's clubs in Sydney at the time, procured a purpose-designed building that was provided with a complete range of facilities for the enjoyment and comfort of its exclusively male members. The building's presence in Bligh Street, now overwhelmed by late 20th-century high-rise buildings, is the only tangible reminder of this association. The changes to the building, firstly by the addition of the mansard-roofed top floor in the early 20th century, followed by the demolition of a substantial portion of the rear of the building in 1973 after it ceased to function as a club, demonstrate the changing needs placed on the building by the early growth and subsequent declining of the role of such exclusive clubs in an evolving Australian society.

The place has a strong or special association with a person, or group of persons, of importance of cultural or natural history of New South Wales's history.

The NSW Club building has importance as one of the surviving, albeit considerably altered, examples of the work of the pre-eminent Victorian-era architect William Wilkinson Wardell.

The place is important in demonstrating aesthetic characteristics and/or a high degree of creative or technical achievement in New South Wales.

The NSW Club building is significant because of its high aesthetic quality such as the use of sandstone on the Bligh Street facade and use on stencil decoration on the main ground floor. The building is also important in demonstrating the evolution of building conservation principles and practice within NSW. The work done on the building in the early years of the 1970s predated the existence of the Burra Charter and the agreements negotiated to secure (partial) retention remain unique with this process contributing to the reconsideration by Sydney City Council of the importance of incentives for owners and developers in retaining heritage sites.

The place has potential to yield information that will contribute to an understanding of the cultural or natural history of New South Wales.

The materials of construction, finishes and decoration of the internal spaces demonstrate the quality of finishes that were a prerequisite of a Victorian-era Gentlemen's club. Whilst some of the fabric has suffered from disturbance, enough remains in original essentially undisturbed condition.

The place possesses uncommon, rare or endangered aspects of the cultural or natural history of New South Wales.

The NSW Club building is the sole surviving example of a Victorian-era Gentlemen's club in the Sydney central business district and one of such few buildings in Australia, an institution that was relatively common during the nineteenth and early twentieth centuries. It would appear to be one of the few such buildings surviving in Australia. The building form has been substantially altered through the demolition in 1973 of the twin rear wings, a consequence of which is that not all of the Club's original functions are now able to be interpreted from the remnant building form and fabric.

== See also ==
- List of clubhouses in New South Wales
