= Maurice Alexander =

Maurice Alexander may refer to:

- Maurice Alexander (Australian politician) (1820–1874), English-born Australian politician
- Maurice Alexander (barrister) (1889–1945), Canadian-British barrister
- Maurice Alexander (safety) (born 1991), American football safety
- Maurice Alexander (wide receiver) (born 1997), American football wide receiver
