= Municipality of Camperdown =

Former local government area in New South Wales, Australia

- Local government area
- Country: Australia
- State: New South Wales
- Established: 13 November 1862
- Abolished: 22 December 1908
- Council seat: Camperdown Town Hall

Area
  - Total: 1.6 km^{2} (0.62 sq mi)
- Parish: Petersham
LGAs around Municipality of Camperdown
| Annandale | The Glebe | Sydney |
| Petersham | Municipality of Camperdown | Darlington |
| | Newtown |

Municipality of Cook
- Local government area
- Country: Australia
- State: New South Wales
- Established: 13 November 1862
- Abolished: 19 February 1870

The Municipality of Camperdown was a local government area of Sydney, New South Wales, Australia. The municipality was proclaimed in 1862 and, with an area of 1.6 square kilometres, covered the entire suburb of Camperdown, as well as small parts of Annandale, Newtown and Stanmore. The municipality unified in February 1870 with the Municipality of Cook, which had also been established in 1862 to the north. After years of financial difficulties, the Camperdown council was formally amalgamated with the City of Sydney on 22 December 1908.

== Council history and location ==
The area of Camperdown, bounded by Orphan School Creek and Parramatta Road to the north, Johnstons Creek in the west, and Newtown Road in the east, was first incorporated on 13 November 1862 when a petition of residents was accepted, and was proclaimed by Governor Sir John Young in the Government Gazette. The first election of Aldermen occurred in February 1863. The Aldermen did not elect a chairman for the small council, in contrast to Cook, prior to the enactment of the Municipalities Act, 1867, when the first mayor was elected in February 1868. Under the enactment of The Municipalities Act of 1867, the title of 'Chairman' for the council was changed to be 'Mayor' and both councils also were renamed as the Borough of Camperdown and the Borough of Cook.

=== Municipality of Cook ===
The northern part of the Camperdown municipality was originally gazetted as the Municipality of Cook on the same day as Camperdown. However its small size proved highly unsustainable and on 1 May 1869 a petition was presented to the NSW Government which expressed the general opinion that:

"the area of the two Boroughs, if united, could be managed with less expense than at present. That the number of ratepayers in Camperdown is only 138, whilst the rates are barely more than sufficient to defray the working expenses, the improvements having to be effected almost solely by the Government endowment. That the ratepayers are desirous that the two Boroughs should be united and bear the name of Camperdown."

The petition was subsequently accepted by the government and the Borough of Cook was subsumed into the Borough of Camperdown on 19 February 1870.

=== Municipality of Camperdown ===
The proclamation subsequently divided the new municipality into three wards: Belmore Ward in the north, Cook Ward in the east and Kingston Ward in the south. However, even with this expansion in the size of the council, it was gradually recognised that the location and size of the municipality was unsustainable and unable to carry out even the most basic of council responsibilities. This was largely because the municipality included large areas occupied by government institutions, such as the Royal Prince Alfred Hospital and the University of Sydney and consequently drew no rates as an income for the council. These institutions also inevitably displaced land that could include the numbers of rate-payers that allowed neighbouring councils to survive and invest in projects that Camperdown could barely afford. The infrastructure demands on the council were significant, including a separate drainage and sewer system and maintenance of major roads such as Missenden Road.

In late 1901 the Camperdown Town Hall on Parramatta Road provided the source of the culmination of decades of financial trouble when the Australian Joint Stock Bank took legal action against the municipality for unpaid debts, which ended in their favour. In 1893 the council had mortgaged the Town Hall with a loan from the Joint Stock Bank. As a consequence, the Town Hall was put up for sale and a receiver was appointed to direct the aldermen on the use and disposal of council monies and assets, which proved a source of great contention. The years of financial troubles also contributed to Camperdown Council's reputation as a rough chamber not a stranger to the brawling of aldermen: "In those days aldermen were not averse to settling a difference of opinion with their fists. A story is told that on one occasion the lights were extinguished and a free fight took place between the aldermen, books and other weapons being freely used."

In late 1903 the council, by now "in a state of hopeless insolvency", was moved to the position of amalgamating the council with one or several of its neighbours. A resolution passed on 27 October invited The Glebe and Newtown councils to discussions over such a proposal, which was firmly rejected by The Glebe. Newtown council were more receptive of the proposal and a report was accepted by Newtown in September 1906. Newtown's proposal was consequent on a significant raising of rates and the establishment of a sinking fund to deal with Camperdown's maintenance backlog and debts. It was this element that proved controversial with Camperdown aldermen, who categorically rejected Newtown's proposal in July 1907 in opposition to the mayor, Thomas Culbert, who had led the negotiations with the previous mayor, Charles Mallett. From 28 December 1906, with the passing of the Local Government Act, 1906, the council underwent a final change, and was again renamed as the "Municipality of Camperdown".

=== Amalgamation with the City of Sydney ===
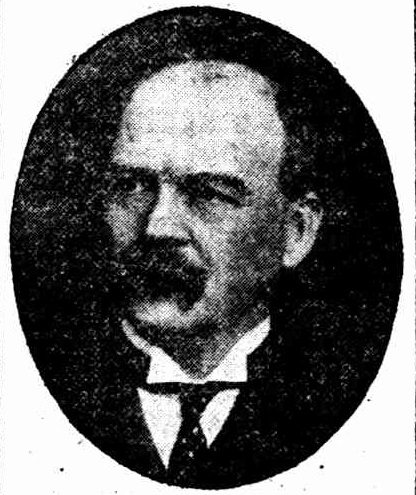
David Gilpin, the last Mayor of Camperdown.

Camperdown council then looked to its more prosperous northern neighbour, the City of Sydney, and a resolution was passed by council in March 1904 which endorsed a proposal that: "in the opinion of this council, it is desirable in the best interests of the Borough of Camperdown to become connected with the City of Sydney by absorption." This resolution set off negotiations with the Sydney City Council which lasted for several years, but, with the council owing around £27,000 (worth roughly $3.8 million AUD in 2015 values) by July 1905, it was clear that the proposal was an inevitable solution, which was made clear in a meeting of ratepayers by the serving mayor and Lord Mayor of Sydney, Allen Taylor. There then followed two referendums of rate-payers, which both gave majorities in favour of accepting the City of Sydney's terms for amalgamation.

The last election of aldermen to Camperdown took place in early 1908, and the last mayor, David Gilpin, was tasked with concluding the negotiations with the City of Sydney, which took the form of a Bill to amend the Sydney Corporation Act 1902. The final meeting of Camperdown council was held on 7 December 1908, with the mayor noting that "I am very pleased to say that the result of the negotiations, in the form of the present Bill, was unanimously agreed to by this council, and has met with the approval of all the ratepayers of Camperdown. The primary object for which we were elected was the extinction of Camperdown as a municipality, and in a few days this will be an accomplished fact." The council officially ceased to exist and was absorbed into the City of Sydney when the Sydney Corporation (Amendment) Act 1908 was passed by the Parliament of New South Wales and assented to on 22 December 1908. A month later, the Sydney Evening News, in reflection of the history of Camperdown council, opined that:

"From any standpoint the new order of things must be welcomed as satisfactory. Under the old regime Camperdown was hopelessly insolvent, many, indeed most, of its streets were almost impassable, and absolutely dangerous to traffic, and there was an ever-growing dissatisfied feeling among the ratepayers that they were getting but a poor return for their municipal taxation."

The Camperdown municipality became the Camperdown Ward of the City of Sydney returning two aldermen. The first elections were held on 8 January 1909, with the two previous mayors of Camperdown returned: David Gilpin and Charles Mallett.

== Mayors ==
=== Camperdown ===
| Ordinal | Mayors | Term start | Term end | Time in office | Notes |
|---|---|---|---|---|---|
| 1 | Joseph Seale | 12 February 1868 | February 1869 | | |
| 2 | George Davison | February 1869 | 18 March 1870 | | |
| 3 | Robert Fowler | 18 March 1870 | 19 February 1872 | | |
| 4 | Thomas Hinds | 19 February 1872 | 14 February 1874 | | |
| 5 | Michael McGrath | 14 February 1874 | 14 February 1876 | | |
| 6 | James Bennett | 14 February 1876 | 19 February 1877 | | |
| 7 | James Larkin | 19 February 1877 | February 1878 | | |
| 8 | Percy Charles Lucas | February 1878 | 17 February 1882 | | |
| 9 | Robert Thomson | 17 February 1882 | 12 February 1885 | | |
| - | Michael McGrath | 12 February 1885 | 20 April 1886 | | |
| 10 | Thomas Larkin | 20 April 1886 | 10 February 1887 | | |
| 11 | George Hudson Sparkes | 10 February 1887 | 9 February 1889 | | |
| 12 | Benjamin Morgan | 9 February 1889 | 12 February 1891 | | |
| 13 | Seaforth Proctor | 12 February 1891 | 16 February 1893 | | |
| 14 | Thomas George Porter | 16 February 1893 | 10 February 1896 | | |
| - | Thomas Larkin | 10 February 1896 | 10 February 1898 | | |
| - | George Hudson Sparkes | 10 February 1898 | 16 February 1899 | | |
| - | Benjamin Morgan | 16 February 1899 | 16 February 1900 | | |
| 15 | Thomas Probert | 16 February 1900 | 15 February 1902 | | |
| - | Thomas Larkin | 15 February 1902 | 13 February 1904 | | |
| - | George Hudson Sparkes | 13 February 1904 | 11 February 1905 | | |
| 16 | Charles Mallett | 11 February 1905 | 11 February 1907 | | |
| 17 | Thomas Culbert | 11 February 1907 | February 1908 | | |
| 18 | David Gilpin | February 1908 | 22 December 1908 | | |

=== Cook ===
| Ordinal | Officer | Title | Term start | Term end | Time in office | Notes |
|---|---|---|---|---|---|---|
| 1 | James Flanagan | Chairman | 5 March 1863 | 1864 | | |
| 2 | James Larkin Snr | Chairman | 1864 | 1866 | | |
| 3 | James Flanagan | Chairman | 1866 | 1867 | | |
| 4 | Michael McGrath | Mayor | 1867 | 10 February 1868 | | |
| 5 | James Maloney | Mayor | 10 February 1868 | 15 February 1869 | | |
| 6 | James Bennett | Mayor | 15 February 1869 | 9 February 1870 | | |
| 7 | Robert Fowler | Mayor | 9 February 1870 | 19 February 1870 | | |

== Town Hall ==
Camperdown Town Hall
- Camperdown Town Hall, on the corner of Parramatta Road and Mallett Street, 1911

General information
- Architectural style: Victorian Italianate
- Groundbreaking: 13 November 1886
- Completed: November 1887
- Demolished: 1917
- Cost: A£5,000

Height
- Height: 34 feet (10 m)

Design and construction
- Architect: William Martin
- Developer: E. E. Ayles

The council first met in council chambers on the northern side of Parramatta Road but by the mid-1880s, certain aldermen desired for the construction of a purpose-built town hall along the lines of other chambers being erected elsewhere in Sydney. A motion to commission the Town Hall was debated by the council on 5 June 1885, but despite the general support carrying the motion, Alderman Beale, a major landowner in the area, opposed the setting aside of £4000 for the hall and that "on account of the present sanitary requirements of the borough the work would be injudicious." The foundation stone for the new town hall, located not far away from the old council chambers other side of Parramatta Road (then known as George Street) on the corner of Park Street (later known as Mallett Street), was laid by the Mayor, Alderman Thomas Larkin, on 13 November 1886. The opening ceremony was notable in that Larkin commented to the crowd that he had "received a note from an alderman of the borough which stated that 'he could not take part in anything that would strangle the borough.'"

The council had approved the hall's ornate Victorian Italianate design by architect William Martin, with E. E. Ayles being the main contractor. The Sydney Morning Herald noted the design thus: "The frontage will be 64 feet to George-street and the depth 112 feet. The building will be 34 feet in height, and will have an ornamental front. It will comprise a council chamber 35 feet x 18 feet, also an office 18 feet x 16 feet, mayor's room, council clerk's office, and an office for an inspector of nuisances. There will also be a main public hall, the dimensions of which will be 58 feet 8 inches and 34 feet 9 inches." The Town Hall was completed by November 1887, and it was noted that it "presents a very handsome appearance from the street" but that the final cost came at over £5000, a substantial sum for a relatively poor and small municipality.

By 1893, the Hall had been heavily mortgaged, and legal action taken by the main lender resulted in its further sale and re-mortgaging in October 1901. With the end of the Council in 1909, the City of Sydney took over the Town Hall, settling its outstanding debts. In March 1909 it was reported to the finance committee of the Sydney City Council that the Town Hall was in a poor state, and that money needed to be put forward for its repair, which was done, and the Hall continued its use as a community meeting place. However, by 1917 the City Council eventually resolved to demolish the old Town Hall "to make way for the construction of two shops and a bank". Its demolition was reported with great interest when the time capsule was uncovered from the foundation stone with several monetary items missing.
