= Electoral district of Clyde =

State electoral district of New South Wales, Australia

The Clyde was an electoral district of the Legislative Assembly in the Australian state of New South Wales which was creating in 1904, named after the Clyde River and replacing Moruya. It was abolished in 1913 and replaced by Bega.

== Members for The Clyde ==
| Member | Party | Term |
|---|---|---|
| William Millard | Liberal Reform | 1904–1913 |

== Election results ==
=== 1910 ===
1910 New South Wales state election: The Clyde
| Party | Candidate | Votes | % | ±% |
|---|---|---|---|---|
| Liberal Reform | William Millard | 2,382 | 59.3 | |
| Labour | William Tomkins | 1,624 | 40.4 | |
| Independent | Samuel Rose | 9 | 0.2 | |
| Total formal votes | | 4,015 | 96.9 | |
| Informal votes | | 126 | 3.0 | |
| Turnout | | 4,141 | 74.8 | |
| Liberal Reform hold | | | | |

=== 1907 ===
1907 New South Wales state election: The Clyde
| Party | Candidate | Votes | % | ±% |
|---|---|---|---|---|
| Liberal Reform | William Millard | 1,902 | 53.6 | |
| Independent | John Keenan | 834 | 23.5 | |
| Labour | William Alley | 815 | 23.0 | |
| Total formal votes | | 3,551 | 96.2 | |
| Informal votes | | 141 | 3.8 | |
| Turnout | | 3,692 | 69.6 | |
| Liberal Reform hold | | | | |

=== 1904 ===
1904 New South Wales state election: The Clyde
| Party | Candidate | Votes | % | ±% |
|---|---|---|---|---|
| Liberal Reform | William Millard | 2,132 | 61.5 | |
| Progressive | John Keenan | 1,336 | 38.5 | |
| Total formal votes | | 3,468 | 99.5 | |
| Informal votes | | 19 | 0.5 | |
| Turnout | | 3,487 | 62.2 | |
| Liberal Reform win | | (new seat) | | |

The Clyde was a new seat which absorbed the whole of whole of the abolished seat of Moruya and parts of the abolished seats of Braidwood and The Shoalhaven. The member for Moruya was William Millard (Liberal Reform). The member for The Shoalhaven was Mark Morton (Liberal Reform) who successfully contested Allowrie. The member for Braidwood was Albert Chapman (Progressive) who did not contest the election.
