= Richard Teece =

Australian actuary and general manager of the Australian Mutual Provident Society

Richard Teece (29 April 1847 – 13 December 1928) was an Australian actuary, general manager and actuary of the Australian Mutual Provident Society.

Teece was born in Paihia, Bay of Islands, New Zealand, the son of William Teece and his wife Catherine, and went with his family to New South Wales in 1854 or in 1852. Teece was educated at the Goulburn Grammar School and from 1865 to 1867 at the University of Sydney. Teece was a keen sportsman, secretary of the University Boat Club and played in early intervarsity cricket matches and later with the Albert and I Zingari clubs.

Having gained a high reputation in connection with actuarial and assurance business, Teece was appointed general manager and actuary of the Australian Mutual Provident Society, a position of high responsibility. He has been President of the Free Trade and Liberal Association of New South Wales and President of the Australian Economic Association. He is also a Fellow and member of the senate of the University of Sydney, President of the Sydney Mechanics' School of Arts, a Fellow of the Institute of Actuaries of Great Britain and Ireland, member of the American Society of Actuaries, member of the British Economic Association, President of Section F at the meeting of the Australasian Association held in Hobart in January 1892. Teece married in Sydney on 12 February 1876, Miss Helena Palmer.

Teece was honorary secretary of the New South Wales Cricket Association and chairman of the Australian Cricket Board 1892–1893. Teece shot himself on 13 December 1928 at his home in Point Piper, survived by four sons and three daughters. Teece was buried in the Anglican section of Gore Hill Cemetery. A son, Richard Clive Teece (1877-1965), became a barrister; a daughter, Emma Linda Palmer Littlejohn (1883–1949), became a feminist and journalist. Two of his brothers, William and Cecil were members of the New South Wales Legislative Assembly for Goulburn.
