= Jack Bailey (New South Wales politician) =

Australian politician

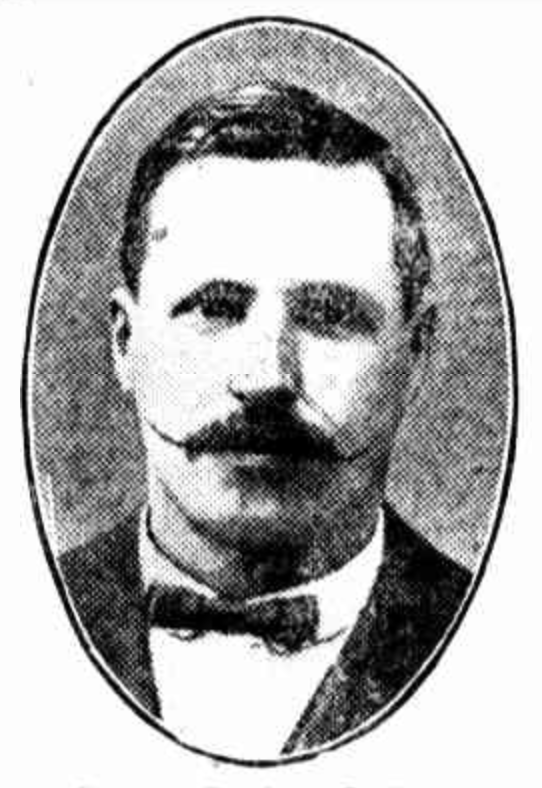
Jack Bailey in 1920

John (Jack) Bailey (14 June 1871 – 26 October 1947) was an Australian politician.

Born at Manus Creek to farmer Thomas Henry Bailey and Rosanna Rielly Boyd, he left school early to work with his father as a shearer. On 29 November 1891, he married Esther Elphick at Tumut. The couple had four children.

In 1901, Bailey joined the Political Labor League, the precursor of the New South Wales Labor Party, and became an organiser with the Australian Workers' Union (AWU). He was president of the A.W.U. central branch from 1915 to 1933, and New South Wales vice-president of the AWU general executive from 1914 to 1923 and from 1927 to 1933.

As a member of the central executive of the NSW Labor Party from 1916 to 1918, he helped to organise the opposition to conscription during World War I. He also helped establish the dominance of the A.W.U. in the N.S.W. Labor Party.

In 1918, Bailey was elected to the New South Wales Legislative Assembly in a by-election for the seat of Monaro, representing the Labor Party. Following the introduction of proportional representation in 1920, he became one of the members for Goulburn, and held his seat at the 1922 election.

In 1924, Bailey was expelled from the Labor Party, following allegations of his involvement in rigging ballot boxes. He saw out the remainder of his term as an independent and did not contest the 1925 election. In December 1929, he was awarded £4500 damages after suing those whose report had led to his expulsion from the party.

In 1931, Bailey was unsuccessful in his bid for a seat in the Australian Senate, but continued to be active in the union movement and was elected president of the New South Wales branch of the AWU in 1938, although that was voided by the union's federal executive.

Bailey developed an interest in gold prospecting and, from 1930, was honorary chairman of the Central Australia Gold Exploration Co., which financed an expedition to find the fabled Lasseter's Reef.

Bailey died at Stanmore in 1947.

New South Wales Legislative Assembly
Preceded by Gus Miller	Member for Monaro; 1918–1920	Abolished
Preceded by Gus James	Member for Goulburn; 1920–1925; Served alongside: James/Millard/Perkins, Rutledge	Succeeded by Perkins, Stokes & Tully
