= Paddy Stokes (politician) =

Australian politician

Cr Paddy Stokes
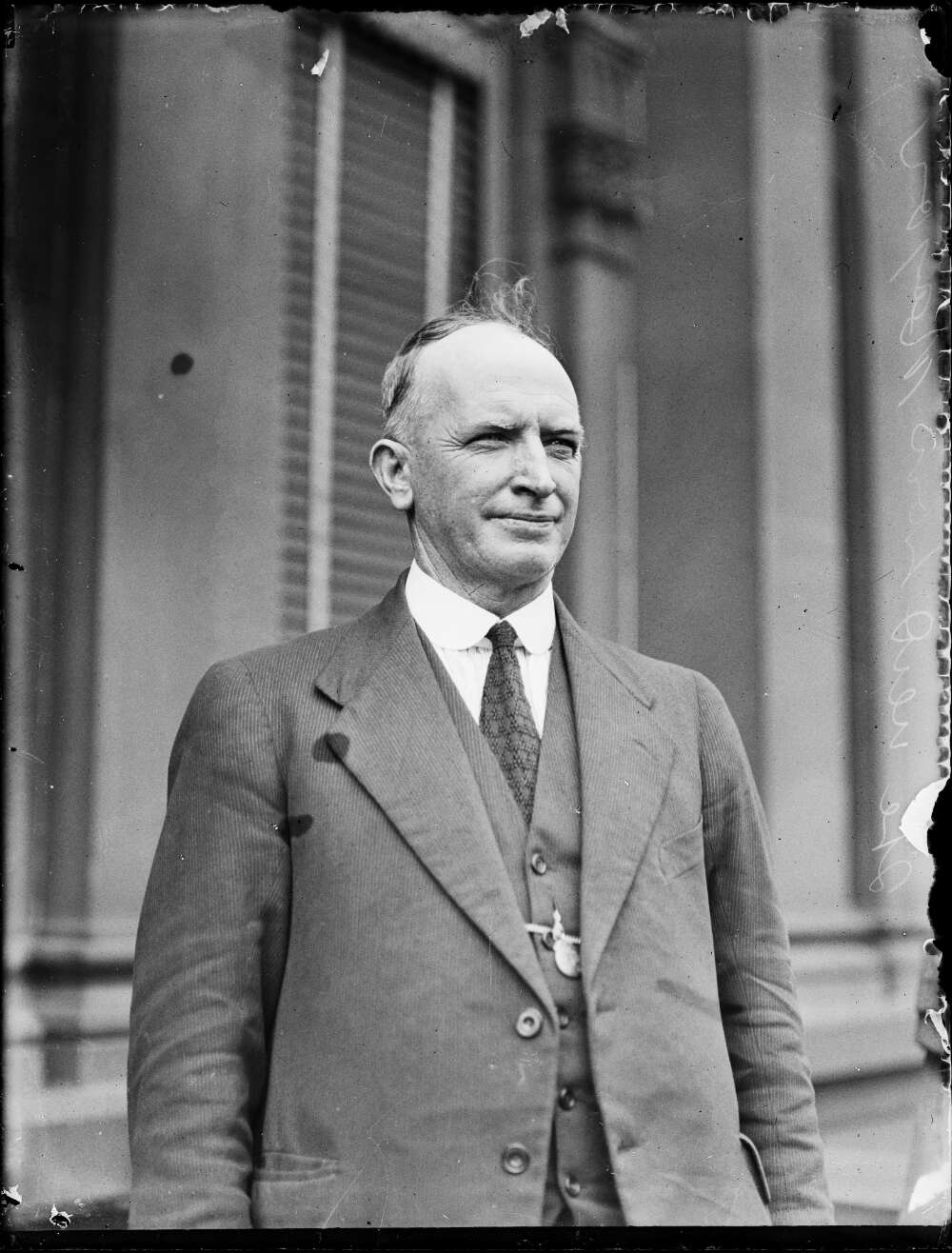
- Stokes in 1925

54th Lord Mayor of Sydney
- In office 1 January 1925 – 31 December 1926
- Preceded by: David Gilpin
- Succeeded by: John Mostyn

Councillor of the City of Sydney for Phillip Ward
- In office 1934 – 6 April 1945

Personal details
- Born: 15 August 1884 Sydney
- Died: 6 April 1945 (aged 60) Lewisham
- Party: Labor Party

Patrick Vincent "Paddy" Stokes (15 August 1884 – 6 April 1945) was an Australian politician.

He was born at Braidwood to farmer Patrick Stokes and Bridget, née Daly. He was educated locally before becoming an engine driver, qualifying in 1908. In that year he was also secretary of the Braidwood branch of the Federated Engine Drivers and Firemen's Association. He served on Sydney City Council from 1918 to 1927 and from 1934 to 1945, with a period from 1925 to 1926 as Lord Mayor. In 1925 he was elected as one of the Labor members for Goulburn in the New South Wales Legislative Assembly, and from May to October 1927 he served as Minister for Agriculture. He was defeated in the 1927 election and became a hotelkeeper, running Foster's Hotel in Sydney from 1929 to 1933, the Family Hotel in Bega from 1934 to 1935, and Victoria Hotel in Canowindra thereafter.

He died at a private hospital in Lewisham on 6 April 1945 (aged 60). His funeral was conducted at St Mary's Cathedral and he was later buried at Rookwood Catholic Cemetery on 7 April 1945.

Parliament of New South Wales
Political offices
Preceded by Bill Dunn	Minister for Agriculture; May – Oct 1927	Succeeded by Harold Thorby
New South Wales Legislative Assembly
Preceded by John Perkins; John Bailey; Thomas Rutledge	Member for Goulburn; 1925 – 1927; With: John Perkins / Henry Bate; Jack Tully	Succeeded by Jack Tully
Civic offices
Preceded by David Gilpin	Lord Mayor of Sydney; 1925 – 1926	Succeeded by John Mostyn
