= John Perkins (Australian politician) =

Australian politician

The Honourable John Perkins
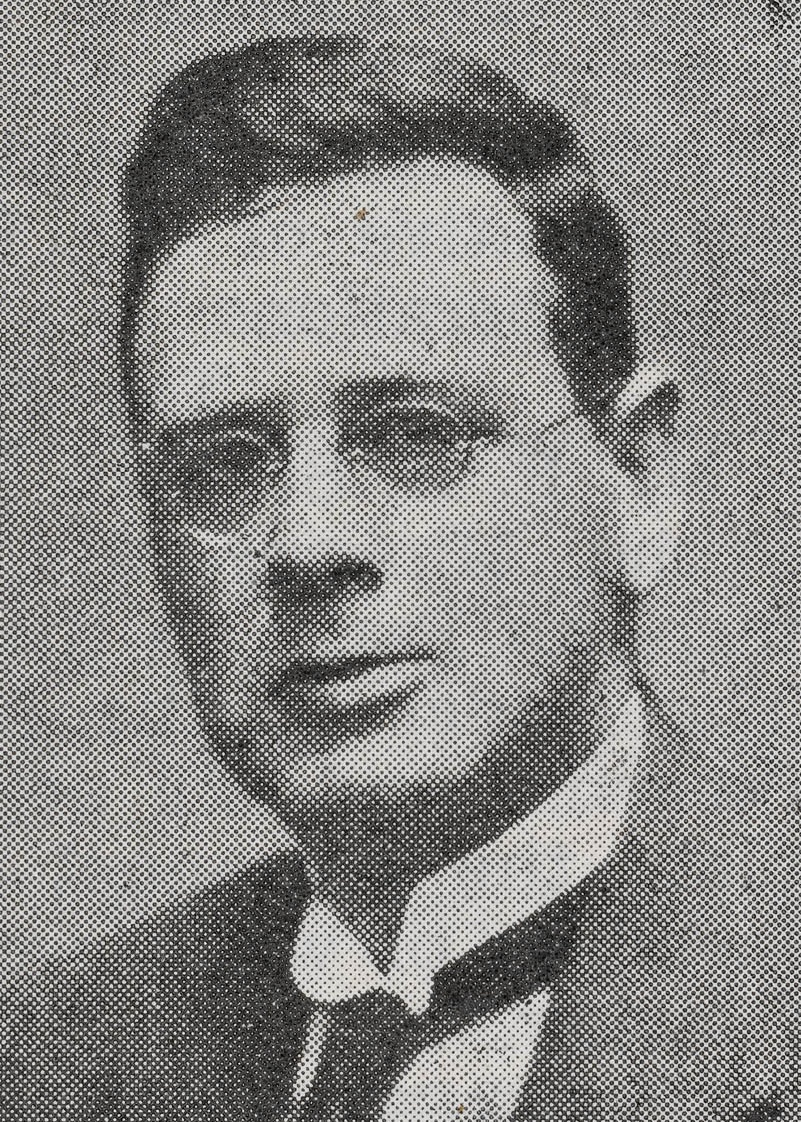

Member of the Australian Parliament for Eden-Monaro
- In office 6 March 1926 – 12 October 1929
- Preceded by: Austin Chapman
- Succeeded by: John Cusack
- In office 19 December 1931 – 21 August 1943
- Preceded by: John Cusack
- Succeeded by: Allan Fraser

Personal details
- Born: 18 May 1878 Gocup, New South Wales
- Died: 13 July 1954 (aged 76) Manly, New South Wales
- Party: Nationalist (1926–1929); UAP (1931–43)
- Spouse: Evelyn Mary Bray
- Occupation: Local councillor

John Arthur Perkins (18 May 1878 – 13 July 1954) was an Australian newsagent, bookseller and politician. He was a member of the Australian House of Representatives from 1926 to 1943, representing the seat of Eden-Monaro for the Nationalist Party of Australia and its successor the United Australia Party. He was a minister in the governments of Joseph Lyons and Robert Menzies.

== Early life and state politics ==
Perkins was born at Gocup near Tumut, New South Wales, and educated at Tumut Public School and Cooma Public School. He was a small farmer at Cooma from 1894 to 1899, when he leased the property and became a newsagent, bookseller and stationer in Cooma. He was a Municipality of Cooma councillor from 1902 to 1909 and was Mayor of Cooma in 1904 and 1908. He was also president of the Cooma School of Arts, president of the Parents' and Citizens' Association, a justice of the peace, the local coroner, a director of the Monaro Grammar School, a member of the local land board and Grand Master of the Independent Order of Oddfellows Manchester Unity. Perkins was an unsuccessful candidate for the New South Wales Legislative Assembly seat of Monaro in 1904 and in 1907. He married Evelyn Mary Bray in 1909.

He was appointed to a casual vacancy for the New South Wales Legislative Assembly seat of Goulburn in November 1921 following the death of Nationalist MP William Millard. As the countback method used to fill vacancies under the 1920-1927 proportional representation experiment (in which each seat had multiple members) was unable to fill the seat, the legislation was changed to allow for him to fill Millard's seat by appointment. He resigned from the Legislative Assembly in January 1926 upon his winning Nationalist Party preselection to contest a federal by-election for the seat of Eden-Monaro.

== Federal parliamentary career ==
In January 1926 Perkins won the Federal seat of Eden-Monaro at a by-election. He lost the seat in 1929 to Labor's John Cusack amid that year's massive Labor landslide. However, Perkins retook the seat in 1931 amid an equally massive landslide for the UAP (Cusack did not stand in that election).

He was government whip from 1926 to 1929 and was appointed Minister for the Interior in the Lyons government in October 1932, responsible among other things for administering the Northern Territory. The anthropologist, A. P. Elkin congratulated him on his efforts "to make inter-racial conditions in the North more equable and more just". Nevertheless, criticism of Australia's treatment of indigenous Australians in the British press led Lyons to drop him from Cabinet in 1934. He was minister without portfolio from November 1937 to November 1938, Minister in charge of Territories for two days in November 1938 and then Minister for Trade and Customs until April 1939, when he became Minister without portfolio administering External Territories until March 1940. He was defeated by Allan Fraser in the 1943 elections.

== Later life ==
Perkins spent the last ten years of his life researching the history of the Monaro region, with some of his records being donated to the State Library of New South Wales upon his death. He died in the Sydney suburb of Manly in 1954, and was accorded a state funeral; he was cremated.

== Notes ==
Political offices
| Preceded by Archdale Parkhill | Minister for the Interior; 1932–1934 | Succeeded by Eric Harrison |
| Preceded by Billy Hughes | Minister in charge of Territories; 1937 | Succeeded by Eric Harrison |
| Preceded by Thomas White | Minister for Trade and Customs; 1938–1939 | Succeeded by John Lawson |
| Preceded by Eric Harrison | Minister without portfolio administering External Territories; 1939–1940 | Succeeded by Horace Nock |
New South Wales Legislative Assembly
| Preceded by William Millard | Member for Goulburn; 1921 – 1926; Served alongside: Rutledge/Stokes, Bailey/Tully | Succeeded by Henry Bate |
Parliament of Australia
| Preceded by Austin Chapman | Member for Eden-Monaro; 1926–1929 | Succeeded by John Cusack |
| Preceded by John Cusack | Member for Eden-Monaro; 1931–1943 | Succeeded by Allan Fraser |
