= 1926 Eden-Monaro by-election =

Australian federal by-election

- 6 March 1926
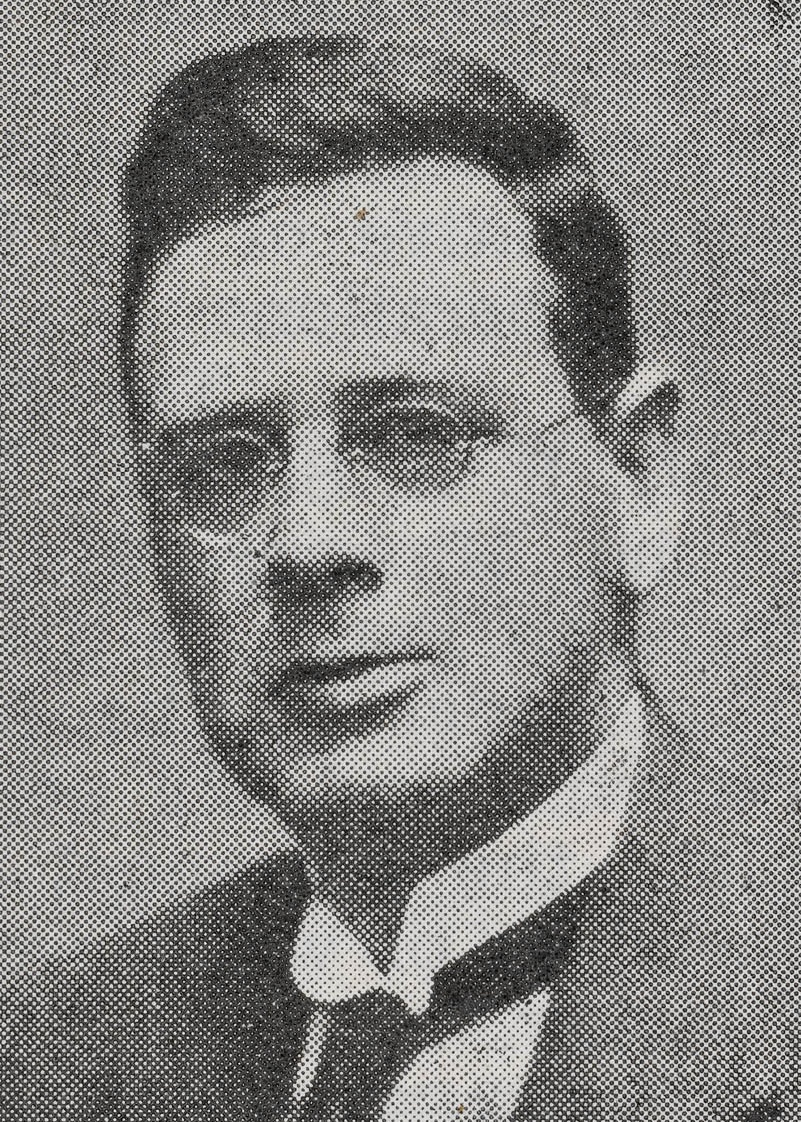

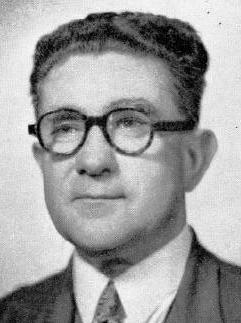
	First party	Second party
Candidate	John Perkins	Charles Morgan
Party	Nationalist	Labor
Popular vote	20,573	13,729
Percentage	60.0%	40.0%
Swing	▼4.6pp	▲4.6pp
MP before election
Austin Chapman
Nationalist
Elected MP
John Perkins
Nationalist

A by-election was held for the Australian House of Representatives seat of Eden-Monaro on 6 March 1926. This was triggered by the death of Nationalist MP Sir Austin Chapman. Canberra residents were not permitted to vote although the Australian Capital Territory is geographically inside the Division.

The by-election was won by Nationalist candidate John Perkins.

== Results ==
Eden-Monaro by-election, 1926
Party	Candidate	Votes	%	±%
Nationalist	John Perkins	20,573	60.0	−4.6
Labor	Charles Morgan	13,729	40.0	+4.6
Total formal votes		34,302	97.5	
Informal votes		887	2.5	
Turnout		35,189	86.3	
Nationalist hold		Swing	−4.6	
