= Wendy Tuckerman =

Australian politician

The Honourable Wendy Tuckerman MP

Member of the New South Wales Parliament for Goulburn
- Incumbent
- Assumed office 23 March 2019
- Preceded by: Pru Goward

Minister for Local Government
- In office 21 December 2021 – 28 March 2023
- Preceded by: Shelley Hancock
- Succeeded by: Ron Hoenig

Personal details
- Born: Wendy Margaret Porter; 5 October 1964 (age 62) Cowra, New South Wales, Australia
- Party: Liberal (since 2019)
- Other political affiliations: National (2017)

Wendy Margaret Tuckerman (née Porter; born 5 October 1964) is an Australian politician who has represented Goulburn in the New South Wales Legislative Assembly since 2019 as a member of the Liberal Party. Prior to entering state politics, she served in local government, including as Mayor of Boorowa Council and Administrator of Hilltops Council. She served as Minister for Local Government in the Perrottet ministry from December 2021 to March 2023.

== Early life and career ==
Tuckerman was born in Cowra, New South Wales. She worked in the Australian Federal Police before becoming involved in local government and regional community affairs.

== Local government ==
Tuckerman served as Mayor of Boorowa Council for twelve years from 2007 until the council's abolition following local government amalgamations in New South Wales. She was subsequently appointed Administrator of the newly created Hilltops Council, which combined the former Boorowa, Harden and Young councils. At the 2017 local government elections, she was elected as a councillor of Hilltops Council.

== State politics ==
In 2017, Tuckerman sought preselection as the National Party candidate for the 2017 Cootamundra state by-election but was unsuccessful.

Tuckerman later joined the Liberal Party and was elected to the New South Wales Legislative Assembly at the 2019 New South Wales state election, succeeding retiring member Pru Goward. She was re-elected at the 2023 New South Wales state election.

== Ministerial service ==
On 21 December 2021, Premier Dominic Perrottet appointed Tuckerman as Minister for Local Government.

She served in the role until the defeat of the Perrottet government at the 2023 state election. She was succeeded by Ron Hoenig in March 2023.

New South Wales Legislative Assembly
| Preceded by Pru Goward | Member for Goulburn; 2019–present | Incumbent |
Political offices
| Preceded by Shelley Hancock | Minister for Local Government; 2021–2023 | Succeeded by Ron Hoenig |
