= David Gilpin =

Australian businessman and politician (1863–1952)

David Gilpin JP
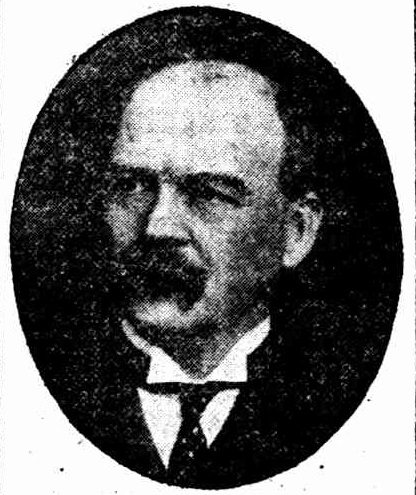

53rd Lord Mayor of Sydney
- In office 1 January 1923 – 31 December 1924
- Preceded by: William McElhone
- Succeeded by: Patrick Vincent Stokes

Alderman of the Sydney City Council
- In office 8 January 1909 – 30 November 1924
- Constituency: Camperdown Ward

18th Mayor of Camperdown
- In office February 1908 – 22 December 1908
- Preceded by: Thomas Culbert
- Succeeded by: Council abolished

Alderman of the Camperdown Municipal Council
- In office 10 February 1906 – 22 December 1908
- Constituency: Belmore Ward; East Kingston Ward

City Member of the Metropolitan Board of Water Supply and Sewerage
- In office 31 March 1922 – 6 January 1925
- Preceded by: William Patrick Fitzgerald
- Succeeded by: Ernest Glasgow

Member of the Metropolitan Board of Water Supply and Sewerage
- In office 31 March 1925 – 19 February 1931
- Preceded by: New Board
- Succeeded by: Andrew Noble Campbell
- Constituency: Fifth

Personal details
- Born: 6 April 1863 Carlisle, Cumberland, England, United Kingdom
- Died: 21 May 1952 (aged 89) Katoomba, New South Wales, Australia
- Party: Civic Reform
- Spouse(s): Mary Ann Southam (m. 1884–1938; her death)

David Gilpin JP (6 April 1863 – 21 May 1952), was an Australian schoolteacher, businessman, accountant and local government politician who served two terms as Lord Mayor of Sydney and was the last Mayor of Camperdown, leading the negotiations that led to Camperdown Council's amalgamation with the City of Sydney in 1908.

== Early life ==
David Gilpin was born on 6 April 1863 at Carlisle, Cumberland, England, and emigrated to Australia aged 3 with his parents in 1866, arriving in Brisbane before moving to Sydney in 1867. Gilpin began his career in 1883 when he was appointed a public school teacher, serving in various country schools. As a teacher he married Mary Ann Southam at Tilba Tilba on 21 October 1884 and they had five sons and two daughters.

Later becoming a Sydney produce merchant and accountant, Gilpin settled with his family in the inner Sydney suburb of Camperdown.

== Political career ==
Gilpin first took elected office as an Auditor for the Council of the small Municipality of Camperdown in February 1904, but, as secretary of Camperdown Ratepayers Association, soon stood for election as an Alderman for Belmore Ward, to which he was elected in February 1906.

Gilpin however joined the council during a period of severe crisis; the council had been running insolvent for the last few years and the Town Hall where council met was fully mortgaged. In the years before his election, Camperdown aldermen had been seeking to amalgamate with one or several of their neighbouring councils, with little success. Gilpin was elected mayor after the February 1908 municipal elections, and tasked himself with concluding the negotiations for Camperdown amalgamating with the City of Sydney.

Gilpin presided over the final meeting of Camperdown council held on 7 December 1908, with Gilpin noting that "I am very pleased to say that the result of the negotiations, in the form of the present Bill, was unanimously agreed to by this council, and has met with the approval of all the ratepayers of Camperdown. The primary object for which we were elected was the extinction of Camperdown as a municipality, and in a few days this will be an accomplished fact." The council officially ceased to exist and was absorbed into the City of Sydney when the Sydney Corporation (Amendment) Act 1908 was passed by the Parliament of New South Wales, with the council area becoming the Camperdown Ward returning two aldermen.

In January 1909, Gilpin was elected alongside his fellow former Camperdown alderman and mayor, Charles Mallett, to the Camperdown Ward of the City of Sydney. Gilpin became one of the council's representatives on the Metropolitan Board of Water Supply and Sewerage in March 1922.

Joining the Civic Reform Association when it was created, Gilpin became honorary secretary and was elected Lord Mayor of Sydney for 1923 and 1924.

Gilpin lost his bid for re-election to his Camperdown Ward seat on the council in the 1924 municipal elections and forfeited his seat on the Water Board as a result. However, when the Water Board was reconstituted in March 1925 shortly after as an elected, rather than appointed body, Gilpin, who now lived in Burwood, stood for election and was successful for the Fifth Constituency (Annandale, Ashfield, Burwood, Concord, Enfield, Glebe, Homebush, Leichhardt, Lidcombe, and Strathfield). After gaining re-election for a further four-year term in 1927, Gilpin was defeated in his 1931 bid for re-election by the Mayor of Leichhardt, Andrew Noble Campbell.

== Later life and legacy ==
Gilpin's wife, Mary Ann, died at their residence, "Kayla", on Parkes Street, Wentworth Falls on 5 November 1938. Gilpin died on 21 May 1952, aged 89 and was buried at Wentworth Falls Church of England Cemetery. Gilpin Street in Camperdown is named after him.

Civic offices
Preceded by Thomas Culbert	Mayor of Camperdown; 1908	Council abolished
Preceded by Richard Meagher	Lord Mayor of Sydney; 1923–1924	Succeeded by John English
