= Leslie Hollis (politician) =

Australian politician

Dr. Leslie Thomas Hollis
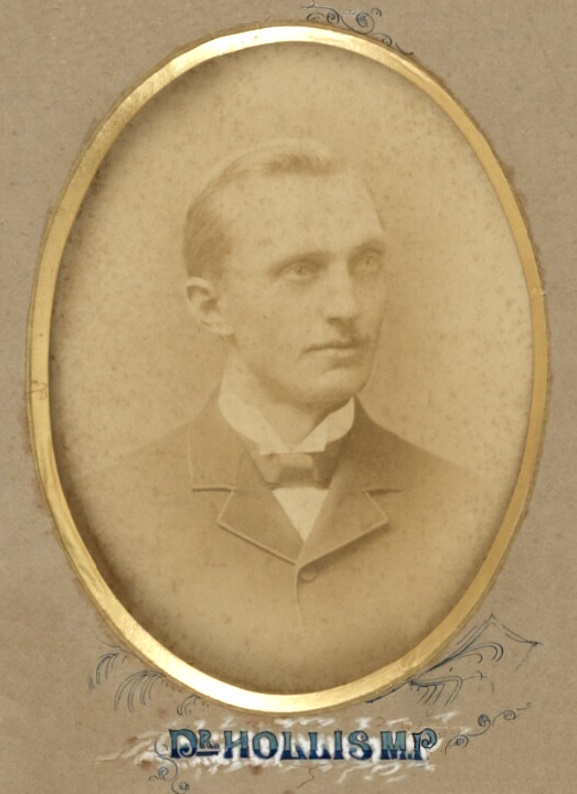

Member for Goulburn (NSW Legislative Assembly)
- In office 17 June 1891 – 25 June 1894

Member for Goulburn (NSW Legislative Assembly)
- In office 17 July 1894 – 5 July 1895

Member for Goulburn (NSW Legislative Assembly)
- In office 24 July 1895 – 8 July 1898

Personal details
- Born: 23 May 1865 Goulburn, New South Wales
- Died: 7 August 1898 (aged 33) Goulburn, New South Wales
- Parents: Henry George Hollis (father); Julia (née Regan) (mother)

Leslie Thomas Hollis (23 May 1865 – 7 August 1898) was an Australian medical practitioner and politician.

In June 1891 Hollis was amongst the initial group of Labor Party members elected to the New South Wales Legislative Assembly. He represented the Goulburn electorate in the New South Wales Legislative Assembly from 1891 to July 1898, initially as a member of the Labor Electoral League in his first term, and later representing the Free Trade Party or as an independent Labor member after refusing to sign Labor's caucus solidarity pledge. From September 1895 Dr. Hollis suffered periodic ill-health from the effects of a stroke and died a month after he retired from parliament.

== Biography ==
=== Early life ===
Leslie Thomas Hollis was born on 23 May 1865 at Goulburn, the son of Henry George Hollis and Julia (née Regan). His father was the superintendent of Goulburn Hospital in Sloane Street. Leslie was the eleventh born of the couple's thirteen children.

Young Leslie received his early education at St. Saviour's Church of England denominational school in Goulburn.

In May 1880 Leslie Hollis was appointed as a student-teacher at the North Goulburn Superior Public School. He remained in that role until December 1883, teaching at both the North Goulburn school and the Goulburn Superior Public School in Bourke Street. Hollis passed his examinations as a pupil-teacher, after which he studied for his matriculation under the headmaster of Goulburn High School, Alfred Davis.

=== Medical practitioner ===
After passing his matriculation exam Hollis attended the University of Sydney from 1885, taking up residence at St. Andrew's College. He studied arts in his first year, after which he qualified for the medical school. For four years from 1886 to 1889 Hollis studied medicine, graduating in 1890 with a Bachelor of Medicine and a Master of Surgery. He received a number of prizes and awards during his university studies, including the Horne scholarship. He was one of the founders of the Sydney University Association, serving as its first secretary, and he was a regular contributor to the university periodical Hermes.

After graduation Dr. Hollis initially acted as locum tenens for Dr. Lamrock at Kogarah. Later in 1890 he accepted an appointment as house surgeon of the Sydney Hospital, resigning from that position at the end of the year. In January 1891 Hollis commenced practicing as a medical practitioner in Goulburn, following the death of Dr. Peter Gentle of that place on 3 January.

In the six months before he was elected to parliament Dr. Hollis built up a large practice at Goulburn. Hollis was one of the medical staff of Goulburn Hospital but later resigned from that position due to the pressure of parliamentary duties. He also served as surgeon of the local fire brigade and the medical officer of several friendly societies.

=== Political career ===
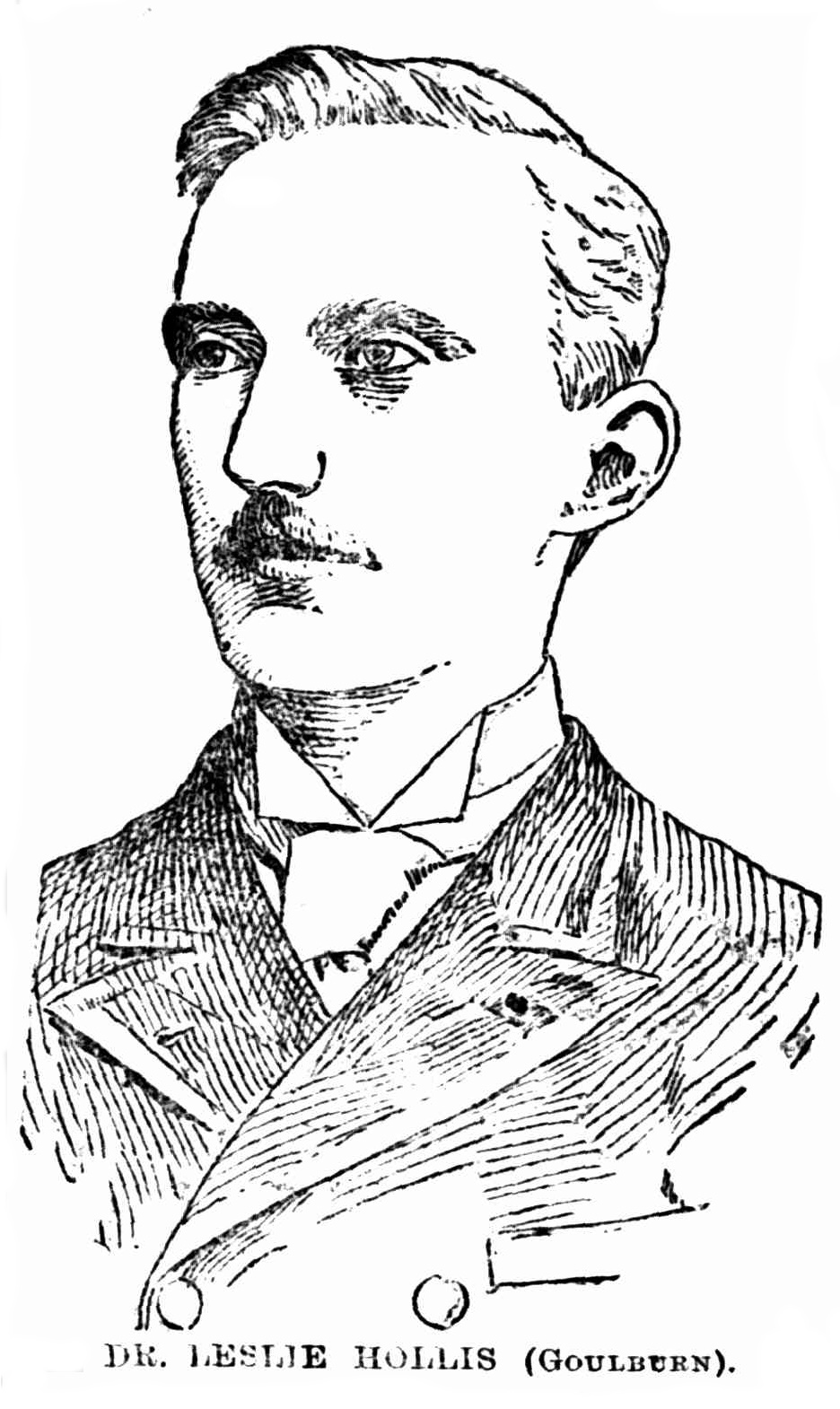
Illustration of Dr. Leslie T. Hollis, published in Evening News, 29 June 1891.

The 1891 general election in New South Wales, held in June and early July 1891, saw the first electoral successes of the Labor Party (then known as the Labor Electoral League of New South Wales). Hollis was known to have "a deep interest in political and social questions". He had joined the Single Tax League in the late 1880s and was an early member of the Goulburn branch of the Labor Electoral League, formed in April 1891. In early June 1891 the Goulburn branch of the Labor Electoral League held a ballot to decide on its candidate to contest the electorate of Goulburn in the New South Wales Legislative Assembly for the forthcoming general election. Of the seven candidates Dr. Hollis received seventy-four votes and Aiden Doyle received twenty-two. The remaining candidates received single figure votes, three of them only one each.

Although Hollis was selected to represent the Goulburn branch of the Labor Electoral League, the runner-up in the poll, Aiden Doyle, refused to accept the verdict and decided to also contest the election, claiming to be the legitimate Labor candidate. Doyle had been a railway worker. At a disorderly meeting held on 13 June 1891 in support of his candidature, Doyle "stated that he ought to receive the labour vote, as he was the only labourer before the electors". He added that "the man who spent six or seven years in study on the human body was not a worker" and maintained "the reason why Dr. Hollis gained 74 votes was because the chairman of the Labour League unduly favoured the doctor". A report of the meeting in the Goulburn Evening Penny Post concluded: "Altogether it was the most disgraceful meeting that has ever been held in Goulburn".

The polling for the Goulburn electorate was held on 17 June 1891, contested by Hollis and Doyle, as well as two other candidates representing the Free Trade and Protectionist parties (at that time the major parliamentary factions in the New South Wales parliament). Hollis was elected to the seat with 823 votes (47.9 percent). The independent Labor candidate, Aiden Doyle, managed only 69 votes (4 percent).^{[A]} Of the thirty-five Labor members elected to the Legislative Assembly in 1891, only three or four had been educated beyond primary school and only Hollis had studied at a university.

In parliament Hollis was a supporter of the initial Labor caucus pledge affirming that decisions made at caucus meetings would be binding on all parliamentary members, based on the trade union tradition of acceptance of decisions freely made at union meetings. In December 1891 the unity of the Labor party members was tested by a censure motion against the government by George Reid, leader of the Free Trade opposition. There was no unanimity of opinion amongst the Labor Party members on the fiscal issue of free trade versus protectionism, and the debate pitted the concept of party solidarity against members' personal beliefs and their constituents' interests. When the vote on Reid's censure motion was held, all the Labor League members, with the exception of James McGowen, "voted as their fiscal faith guided them", producing a split in the Labor vote. Hollis was probably one of the seventeen, all supporters of free trade except McGowen, who voted for the censure motion. Sixteen of the protectionist Labor members supported the government by voting against the motion, which was defeated. Despite subsequent efforts to amend the pledge to bind Labor League parliamentarians to a unified fiscal position as determined by caucus, by June 1894 the Labor members remained divided on the subject of signing a pledge. Hollis expressed the opinion that "the country was being caucussed to death and therefore refused to sign", his decision generally supported by the local Labor Electoral League.

At the 1894 general election Hollis was opposed by Arthur Barrett for the Protectionist Party and an independent free trade candidate. Hollis' candidature had been endorsed by the Free Trade Committee, so he was considered a Free Trade candidate by mainstream newspapers whereas Labor-affiliated newspapers considered him to be an independent Labor candidate. At the election held on 14 July 1894 Hollis was re-elected with 67.8 percent of the vote.

At the 1895 general election Hollis stood for the Free Trade Party against the Protectionist Party candidate, Arthur Barrett. At the election held on 20 July 1895 Hollis was re-elected with 71.2 percent of the vote.

Hollis retired from parliament at the end of his third term in July 1898, due to his continual ill-health.

=== Death ===
Hollis had been in failing health from September 1895 when, while visiting a friend at Warren, he suffered a stroke aggravated by a weak heart. His condition gradually improved, though with occasional relapses. In late July 1898, however, Hollis' "most serious symptoms manifested themselves", and combined with a bout of influenza, his "enfeebled condition" proved to be fatal. Hollis died at his residence in Auburn Street on the evening of 7 August 1898.

== Notes ==
A.The previous sitting member for the Goulburn electorate, William Teece, who had held the seat since 1872, had died in August 1890. At a by-election held on 16 August 1890 Teece's brother Cecil was elected, but did not contest the 1891 election.

New South Wales Legislative Assembly
Preceded by Cecil Teece	Member for Goulburn; 1891–1898	Succeeded by James Ashton
