= Electoral district of Moruya =

Former state electoral district of New South Wales, Australia

Moruya was an electoral district of the Legislative Assembly in the Australian state of New South Wales from 1894 to 1904, named after Moruya. It was created from parts of the districts of Eden and The Shoalhaven. Its only member was William Millard, who held it for the Free Trade Party until 1904 when it was replaced by The Clyde.

== Members for Moruya ==
Member	Party	Term
William Millard	Free Trade	1894–1901
William Millard	Liberal Reform	1901–1904

== Election results ==
1901 New South Wales state election: Moruya
Party	Candidate	Votes	%	±%
Liberal Reform	William Millard	956	65.6	+12.5
Independent	Joynton Smith	440	30.2	
Progressive	Theophilus Cox	62	4.3	−42.1
Total formal votes		1,458	99.6	+0.5
Informal votes		6	0.4	−0.5
Turnout		1,464	70.6	−2.2
Liberal Reform hold				
