= Laurie Tully =

Australian politician (1917–1981)

Membe of New South Wales Legislative Assembly
- In office 1946–1965
- Preceded by: Jack Tully
- Succeeded by: Ron Brewer

Personal details
- Born: 30 July 1917 Sydney
- Died: 27 June 1981 (aged 63) Goulburn, New South Wales
- Party: Labor Party
- Relations: Jack Tully (father)
- Education: St Patrick's College

Laurence John Tully (30 July 1917 – 27 June 1981) was an Australian politician and a member of the New South Wales Legislative Assembly from 1946 until 1965. He was a member of the Labor Party (ALP).

== Biography ==
Tully was born on 30 July 1917, in Sydney, to politician Jack Tully. He was educated at St Patrick's College, Goulburn and the law faculty of the University of Sydney. He was called to the bar in 1942. During World War Two, he served with the Royal Australian Air Force. After an unsuccessful campaign in the seat of Temora in 1944, Tully was elected to the parliament as the Labor member for Goulburn at the 1946 by-election caused by the resignation of his father. Tully retained the seat for the Labor Party at the next 6 elections and retired from public life at the 1965 election. He later became a company director. He was briefly the Acting Chairman of Committees but did not hold any other party, parliamentary or ministerial office. He died on 27 June 1981, aged 63, in Goulburn.

New South Wales Legislative Assembly
Preceded by Jack Tully	Member for Goulburn; 1946–1965	Succeeded by Ron Brewer
