= Gus James =

American baseball player (born 1881)

- Utility player
- Born: 1881
- Died: Unknown
- Batted: Unknown Threw: Unknown

Teams
- Brooklyn Royal Giants (1907–1912); Paterson Smart Set (1912)

Augustus James (born 1881) was a Negro leagues utility player for several years before the founding of the first Negro National League. He often played as a second baseman or catcher, and played most of his seasons for the Brooklyn Royal Giants.
