= St Patrick's College, Goulburn =

Independent boys' school in Goulburn, New South Wales, Australia

St Patrick's College

Location
- Goulburn, New South Wales; Australia; 34°45′04″S 149°41′59″E

Information
- Type: Independent, boys'
- Motto: Latin: Age Quod Agis (If you do something, do it well)
- Denomination: Roman Catholic; Congregation of Christian Brothers
- Patron saint: Saint Patrick
- Established: 1874
- Status: Closed
- Closed: 2000 (merged into Trinity Catholic College, Goulburn)
- Colours: Maroon and blue

Collectable Australian school cigarette card featuring the St Patrick's colours & crest, c. 1920s

St Patrick's College, Goulburn was an independent, Roman Catholic, day and boarding school for boys located in Goulburn, New South Wales, Australia.

The college, founded by the Goulburn Catholic Diocese in 1874, had been operated by the Christian Brothers from 1897 until its closure. It was one of a number of schools founded or taken over by the Christian Brothers in Australia in the 1890s. It attended the initial meetings leading to the formation of Athletic Association of the Great Public Schools of New South Wales in 1892 but didn't ever take part in any of the association's activities. It is also a school which has a significant Rugby Union tradition.

The school ceased to exist in its present form in 2000 when it amalgamated with Marian College for girls in Goulburn to become Trinity Catholic College, Goulburn. The amalgamation was essentially due to declining enrolments, linked in part to Goulburn's decline in population and importance as a regional centre, a process which has been occurring gradually over the past century, particularly after the founding of Canberra in 1913. The respective schools in three different locations were then gradually consolidated on the old St. Patrick's campus.

The brothers continued to operate the boys' boarding residence but due to a lack of resources this facility was amalgamated with the girls' boarding school from North Goulburn at the old St. Patrick's campus in 2006. The responsibility for the boarding facilities transferred at this time from the brothers back to the now Archdiocese through the Catholic Education Office. This ended 109 years of service by the Christian Brothers on the school site. The boarding facility was shut down entirely at the end of 2009, completing 135 years of operation.

After the amalgamation, the teacher and professional historian Dr Bollen published a history of the college.

== Notable alumni ==
- Michael Durack ("M.P.") and John Durack (J.W.), circa 1877–1881, sons of Irish immigrants who had fled the Great Famine to become one of Australia's most significant pioneer grazing families, opening up the Kimberley, WA. Their stories are told in the books by Dame Mary Durack, Kings in Grass Castles and its sequel, Sons in the Saddle.
- Right Reverend Joseph Dwyer – circa 1881–1885, Bishop of Wagga Wagga 1918–1939 though other sources claim he instead attended St. Stanislaus College.
- Patrick Hartigan – 1892–1897, priest and poet, whose poems were collected in a book, and later filmed, under the title of Around the Boree Log, published under the pseudonym John O'Brien
- Jack Tully – circa 1897–1902, Australian parliamentarian, Member for Goulburn in the NSW Parliament, 1925–1932 and 1935–1946 and Secretary of Lands 1930–1932 and 1941–1946.
- Joseph Lamaro – circa 1907–1911, Attorney General of NSW 1931–1932
- Billy Sheahan – circa 1907–1911, Attorney General of NSW 1953–1956
- James Dwyer McGee - circa 1915–1922, physicist, one of the main inventors of the television camera at EMI in West London, around 1932
- Reg Downing – circa 1916–1918, Attorney General of NSW 1956–1965
- Laurie Tully – circa 1929–1933 Australian parliamentarian, Member for Goulburn in the NSW Parliament, 1946–1965 succeeding his father in the seat.
- Bill O'Reilly – circa 1929–1930 Australian Test Cricketer, 1932–1946 and sports journalist.
- Alan Reid – circa 1929–1930 political journalist and author, who coined the Australian political term "faceless men".
- John Ryan – circa 1936–1941, diplomat and Director-General of the Australian Secret Intelligence Service.
- Bruce Devlin – circa 1949–1953, golfer
- John Hannaford – circa 1962–1966, Attorney General of NSW 1992–1995
- Terry Casey – 1963–1964, Rugby Union International – Wallaby (fullback)
- Simon Poidevin – 1971–1976, Rugby Union International – Wallaby (breakaway)
- Neale Daniher – 1973–1976, Essendon VFL footballer, and later coach of the Melbourne Demons.

== Notable staff ==
- Very Reverend Patrick Dunne V.G., who was the foundation president of the college (principal) in 1874.
- Dr. John Gallagher, who was the second president of the college 1875–1888 and later Bishop of Goulburn – 1895–1899 as coadjutor and from 1900 to 1923 as bishop in his own right.
- Christopher Brennan, poet who taught at the school in 1891.
- Rev. Joseph Dwyer – "professor" circa 1894–1897, later Bishop of Wagga Wagga 1918–1939
- Br. Dan Marzorini, Christian Brother who taught at the school in 1945 and was college president from 1956–1961 and 1975–1986.
- Jim Roxburgh, lay teacher, who taught at the school circa 1976–2000, former Rugby Union International – Wallaby – 1968–1970 and noted anti-Apartheid protester.

== See also ==
- List of non-government schools in New South Wales
- List of boarding schools
