= William Millard (politician) =

Australian politician (1844–1921)

Member of the New South Wales Legislative Assembly for Moruya
- In office 1894–1904

Member of the New South Wales Legislative Assembly for the Clyde
- In office 1904–1913

Member of the New South Wales Legislative Assembly for Bega
- In office 1913–1920

Member of the New South Wales Legislative Assembly for Goulburn
- In office 1920–1921

Personal details
- Born: 11 January 1844 Wollongong
- Died: 8 October 1921 (aged 77) Bondi
- Party: Free Trade; Liberal Reform Party; Nationalist Party of Australia

William Millard (11 January 1844 – 8 October 1921) was an Australian politician.

He was born in Wollongong to storekeeper Richard Millard and Anne, née Radler. In 1854 his family moved to Ulladulla, and he was educated locally before entering his father's tanning business. He married his first wife, Mary Walter, in 1866 at Shellharbour; they had four children. He was a lieutenant in the Ulladulla Voluntary Rifles from 1869 to 1882, a captain in the Ulladulla Corps reserve from 1882 to 1884, and a captain in the 2nd Infantry Regiment from 1884 to 1893.

At the 1894 election he was elected to the New South Wales Legislative Assembly as the Free Trade member for Moruya. He continued to serve the region for 27 years, through 4 districts and 3 political parties. In 1901 the Free Trade party in NSW was renamed the Liberal Reform Party. At the 1904 election the district was renamed the Clyde after the Clyde River that flowed through the region. Clyde in turn was replaced by Bega at the 1913 election. For the 1917 election he was a member of the New South Wales branch of the Nationalist Party of Australia following the merger between the Liberal Reform Party and the pro-conscription elements of Labor.

For the 1920 election the Legislative Assembly was elected using a form of proportional representation with multi-member seats and a single transferable vote (modified Hare-Clark) and Bega was absorbed by Goulburn. Millard and Gus James were the candidates for the Nationalist Party, but only James was elected. James resigned just six months later to accept an appointment as an Acting Judge of the Supreme Court of New South Wales, and Millard, being the unsuccessful Nationalist candidate, was appointed to the vacancy, taking his seat on 15 December 1920.

Millard died on 8 October 1921 (aged 77) at Bondi. Despite twenty-seven years in parliament he never served as a minister.

New South Wales Legislative Assembly
New district	Member for Moruya; 1894–1904	Replaced by Clyde
New district	Member for the Clyde; 1904–1913	Replaced by Bega
Preceded by William Wood	Member for Bega; 1913–1920	Absorbed into Goulburn
Preceded by Gus James	Member for Goulburn; 1920–1921; Served alongside: John Bailey, Thomas Rutledge	Succeeded by John Perkins
