= Augustus James =

Australian politician

The Honourable Augustus George James KC

Justice of the Supreme Court of New South Wales
- In office 5 January 1921 – 27 February 1934

Minister for Labour and Industry
- In office 23 Jul 1919 – 12 Apr 1920
- Preceded by: George Beeby
- Succeeded by: George Cann

Minister of Public Instruction
- In office 15 Nov 1916 – 12 Apr 1920
- Preceded by: Arthur Griffith
- Succeeded by: Thomas Mutch

Member of the New South Wales Legislative Assembly for Goulburn
- In office 10 September 1907 – 21 September 1920
- Preceded by: James Ashton
- Succeeded by: William Millard

Personal details
- Born: 30 October 1866 Sydney, Colony of New South Wales, Australia
- Died: 27 February 1934 (aged 67) Woollahra, New South Wales, Australia

Augustus (Gus) George Frederic James KC (30 October 1866 – 27 February 1934) was an Australian politician. He was the Liberal/Nationalist member for Goulburn in the New South Wales Legislative Assembly from 1907 to 1920.

== Political career ==
James served as Minister of Public Instruction in the Holman Nationalist ministry from November 1916 to April 1920, adding the portfolio of Labour and Industry from July 1919. James was appointed King's Counsel on 29 October 1919.

He was appointed an Acting Judge of the Supreme Court of New South Wales on 21 September 1920 for six months and a Puisne Judge on 5 January 1921.

James died on February 27, 1934 (aged 67). He had married Altona Johanna Bohrsmann on 17 August 1892 and they had five children, 3 daughters and 2 sons.

Parliament of New South Wales
Political offices
Preceded by Arthur Griffith	Minister of Public Instruction; 1916 – 1920	Succeeded by Thomas Mutch
Preceded by George Beeby	Minister for Labour and Industry; 1919 – 1920	Succeeded by George Cann
New South Wales Legislative Assembly
Preceded by James Ashton	Member for Goulburn; 1907–1920	Succeeded by William Millard
