= Electoral district of Goulburn =

State electoral district of New South Wales, Australia

Goulburn New South Wales—Legislative Assembly
- Interactive map of district boundaries from the 2023 state election
- State: New South Wales
- Dates current: 1859–1991; 2007–present
- MP: Wendy Tuckerman
- Party: Liberal Party
- Electors: 57,607 (2023)
- Area: 18,827.31 km^{2} (7,269.3 sq mi)
- Demographic: Rural
Electorates around Goulburn:
Cootamundra	Bathurst	Wollondilly
Cootamundra	Goulburn	Kiama
ACT; Wagga Wagga	Monaro	Kiama

Goulburn is an electoral district of the Legislative Assembly in the Australian state of New South Wales. It is represented by Wendy Tuckerman of the Liberal Party.

Goulburn is a regional electorate. It encompasses all of Goulburn Mulwaree Council, Yass Valley Council, Upper Lachlan Shire, the eastern part of Hilltops Council and a large part of Wingecarribee Shire. Its population centres include Goulburn and Yass, as well as Marulan, Tallong, Towrang, Bungonia, Lake Bathurst, Tarago, Moss Vale, Bundanoon, Berrima, Sutton Forest, Exeter, Wingello, Penrose, Taralga, Murrumbateman, Boorowa, Crookwell and Gunning.

== History ==
Goulburn was first established in 1859, partly replacing Southern Boroughs. In 1920, with the introduction of proportional representation, it absorbed Monaro and Bega and elected three members simultaneously. Monaro and South Coast were separated from it in 1927 and it reverted to a single-member electorate. It was abolished in 1991, but recreated for the 2007 general election from part of the abolished district of Southern Highlands and part of the old Burrinjuck.

== Members for Goulburn ==
Single-member (1859–1920)
Member	Party	Term
William Roberts	None	1859–1860
Charles Walsh	None	1860–1861
Maurice Alexander	None	1861–1872
William Teece	None	1872–1887
William Teece	Free Trade	1887–1890
Cecil Teece	Independent	1890–1891
Leslie Hollis	Labor	1891–1894
Leslie Hollis	Free Trade	1894–1898
James Ashton	Free Trade	1898–1901
James Ashton	Liberal Reform	1901–1907
Gus James	Liberal Reform	1907–1917
Gus James	Nationalist	1917–1920

Three members (1920–1927)
Member	Party	Term	Member	Party	Term	Member	Party	Term
Gus James	Nationalist	1920–1920	Thomas Rutledge	Progressive	1920–1925	John Bailey	Labor	1920–1925
William Millard	Nationalist	1920–1921	Thomas Rutledge	Progressive	1920–1925	John Bailey	Labor	1920–1925
John Perkins	Nationalist	1921–1926	Thomas Rutledge	Progressive	1920–1925	John Bailey	Labor	1920–1925
John Perkins	Nationalist	1921–1926	Paddy Stokes	Labor	1925–1927	Jack Tully	Labor	1925–1927
Henry Bate	Nationalist	1926–1927	Paddy Stokes	Labor	1925–1927	Jack Tully	Labor	1925–1927

Single member (1927–1991)
Member	Party	Term
Jack Tully	Labor	1927–1932
Peter Loughlin	United Australia	1932–1935
Jack Tully	Labor	1935–1946
Laurie Tully	Labor	1946–1965
Ron Brewer	Country	1965–1975
Ron Brewer	National Country	1975–1982
Ron Brewer	National	1982–1984
Robert Webster	National	1984–1991

=== 2nd incarnation (2007–present) ===
Single member (2007–present)
Member	Party	Term
Pru Goward	Liberal	2007–2019
Wendy Tuckerman	Liberal	2019–present

== Election results ==
2023 New South Wales state election: Goulburn
Party	Candidate	Votes	%	±%
Liberal	Wendy Tuckerman	20,737	40.8	+2.1
Labor	Michael Pilbrow	18,028	35.5	+5.2
Shooters, Fishers, Farmers	Andrew Wood	6,891	13.6	+4.3
Greens	John Olsen	3,587	7.1	−1.2
Sustainable Australia	Margaret Logan	1,532	3.0	+3.0
Total formal votes		50,775	97.0	+0.1
Informal votes		1,553	3.0	−0.1
Turnout		52,328	90.8	+0.5
Two-party-preferred result
Liberal	Wendy Tuckerman	23,185	51.3	−1.8
Labor	Michael Pilbrow	22,015	48.7	+1.8
Liberal hold		Swing	−1.8	
