= Ron Brewer (politician) =

Australian politician (1921–2003)

Ronald Alfred St Clair Brewer (8 April 1921 – 16 June 2003) was an Australian politician. He was the Country Party member for Goulburn in the New South Wales Legislative Assembly from 1965 to 1984.

== Biography ==
Born on 8 April 1921, in Watsons Bay, Sydney, to farmer Alfred George Brewer and Doris Griffin, he was educated at Gunning, Goulburn and Naremburn, leaving school at age 14. He became a rural worker before enlisting in the armed forces in 1938, serving in the 7th Light Horse Regiment of the 2nd Light Horse Brigade until 1940, when he joined the Royal Australian Air Force. He was discharged as medically unfit in 1942, and joined the Second Australian Imperial Force, being stationed in New Guinea as a warrant officer. He was discharged from the armed forces in 1946.

Brewer married Dorothy Sorrell on 16 November 1946, with whom he would have six children. As an ex-serviceman he was settled with the Green Hills property near Marulan in 1948, and he became captain of the local Bush Fire Brigade. In 1959, he was elected to Mulwaree Shire Council, becoming president in 1962; he served until 1965.

In 1965, Brewer was elected to the New South Wales Legislative Assembly as the Country Party member for Goulburn, winning the Labor-held seat after a three-cornered contest with both Labor and the Liberal Party. He held the seat easily until 1974, when he resigned to contest the federal seat of Eden-Monaro. Narrowly defeated by sitting Labor MP Jim Snow, Brewer contested the by-election for his old state seat and was re-elected. Redistributions weakened his margin in subsequent years, and he retired in 1984.

Brewer died in Goulburn on 16 June 2003, aged 72.

New South Wales Legislative Assembly
Preceded by Laurie Tully	Member for Goulburn; 1965–1984	Succeeded by Robert Webster
