= Cecil Teece =

Australian barrister and politician

Cecil Bedford Teece (24 December 1864 – 21 November 1917) was an Australian barrister and politician.

He was born in Goulburn to tanner William Teece and Catherine Hassall. He married Mary Jane Evan Buchanan on 19 December 1883; they had two sons. A lawyer, he was called to the Bar in 1889. In 1890 he was elected to the New South Wales Legislative Assembly for Goulburn, in a by-election caused by the death of his brother William. He did not contest the 1891 election. Teece died at Wee Waa in 1917. Another brother, Richard, was the general manager of the Australian Mutual Provident Society.

New South Wales Legislative Assembly
| Preceded by William Teece | Member for Goulburn; 1890–1891 | Succeeded by Leslie Hollis |
