= William Teece =

Australian bootmaker and politician

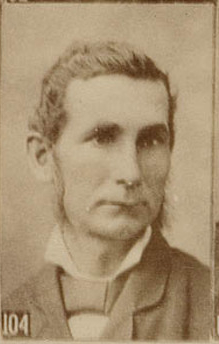

William Teece (1845 – 3 August 1890) was an Australian bootmaker and politician. He was born at Russell in New Zealand to tanner William Teece and Catherine Hassall. His family migrated to New South Wales in 1859, where he was apprenticed to his father, eventually becoming manager of the business. On 29 January 1872 he married Anna Bella Tinsley, with whom he had two sons. In 1872 he was elected to the New South Wales Legislative Assembly as the member for Goulburn. He served until his death in Sydney in 1890, whereupon he was succeeded by his brother Cecil. Another brother, Richard, was the general manager of the Australian Mutual Provident Society.

New South Wales Legislative Assembly
Preceded by Maurice Alexander	Member for Goulburn; 1872–1890	Succeeded by Cecil Teece
