= Maurice Alexander (Australian politician) =

English-born Australian politician

Member of the New South Wales Legislative Assembly from Goulburn
- In office 1861–1872
- Preceded by: Charles Walsh
- Succeeded by: William Teece

Personal details
- Born: 1820; London, England
- Died: 27 January 1874 (aged 53–54); Sydney, Australia

Maurice Alexander (1820 – 27 January 1874) was an English-born Australian politician who served as a member of the New South Wales Legislative Assembly from 1861 to 1872.

== Background ==
He was born in London to merchant Isaac Alexander and Susan Levy. He migrated to Sydney in 1834 and became a merchant. He also owned property at Goulburn. In 1857 he married Isabella Levey. In 1861 he was elected to the New South Wales Legislative Assembly for Goulburn, serving until his defeat in 1872.

Alexander died in Sydney on 27 January 1874.

New South Wales Legislative Assembly
Preceded by Charles Walsh	Member for Goulburn; 1861–1872	Succeeded by William Teece
