= Jack Tully =

Australian politician (1885–1966)

John Moran Tully (1 December 1885 – 27 October 1966) was an Australian politician. He was a Labor member of the New South Wales Legislative Assembly from 1925 to 1932 and from 1935 to 1946.

Born at Mulgoa to railway officer Peter Tully and teacher Sarah Lovat, he attended St Patrick's College in Goulburn before becoming a public servant. He was an assistant at the public library from 1903 to 1908 and a draughtsman at the Registrar General's Department from 1908 to 1925 and 1932 to 1935. On 4 October 1916, he married Dorothy Kitching, with whom he had two sons.

He had joined the Labor Party in 1913 and became president of the Chatswood branch. In 1925, he was elected to the New South Wales Legislative Assembly for Goulburn. He became Secretary for Lands in 1930, but lost his seat in 1932. He returned to the Assembly in 1935, and was again appointed Secretary for Lands in 1941. He resigned in 1946 to accept appointment as Agent-General for New South Wales in London, and was succeeded by his son Laurie.

He died at Roseville on 27 October 1966, aged 80.

Parliament of New South Wales
Political offices
Preceded by Richard Ball	Secretary for Lands; 1930 – 1932	Succeeded by Ernest Buttenshaw
Preceded by Alfred Yeo	Secretary for Lands; 1941 – 1946	Succeeded by Bill Dunn
New South Wales Legislative Assembly
Preceded by John Bailey	Member for Goulburn; 1925 – 1932	Succeeded by Peter Loughlin
Preceded by Peter Loughlin	Member for Goulburn; 1935 – 1946	Succeeded by Laurie Tully
Diplomatic posts
Vacant Title last held by Clifford Hay	Agent-General for New South Wales; 1946 – 1954	Succeeded by Francis Buckley
