= Alard =

Alard may refer to:

- Alard (surname)
- Alard, son of Duke Aymon in the Matter of France
- Alard, Iran, a village in Tehran Province
- Alard, East Azerbaijan, a village in Iran
- Alard Stradivarius (disambiguation), two violins
  - Alard–Baron Knoop Stradivarius, 1715
  - Artot–Alard Stradivarius, 1728

== See also ==
- Allard (disambiguation)
