= Allard (surname) =

Allard is a French and English surname. The surname is derived from the given name Adelard.

Allard may refer to:

== People ==
- Bill Allard (born 1937), American photographer
- Carole-Marie Allard (1949–2024), Canadian politician
- Christian Allard (born 1964), Scottish politician
- Don Allard (1936–2002), American college and professional football player
- Eudore Allard (1915–2001), Canadian politician
- Félix Allard (1897–1974), Canadian politician and lawyer
- Frédéric Allard (born 1997), Canadian ice hockey player
- Geoffrey Allard (1912–1941), Battle of Britain Fighter Ace
- Henry Allard (1911–1996), Swedish politician
- J Allard (born 1969), American computer businessman
- Jamie Allard, American politician from Alaska
- Jean-François Allard (1785–1839), French soldier and adventurer
- Jean-Guy Allard (1948–2016), Canadian journalist
- Jean René Allard (1930–2020), Canadian politician
- Jean Victor Allard (1913–1996), Canadian general
- Kolby Allard (born 1997), American baseball player
- Linda Allard (born c. 1940), American fashion designer
- Marie Allard (1738–1802), French dancer
- Markus Allard (born 1990), Swedish politician
- Maurice Allard (1922–1988), Canadian politician, law professor and lawyer
- Michèle Allard, former French figure skater
- Nicholas Allard (born 1952), American Dean and President of Brooklyn Law School
- Peter Allard, QC, founder of Allard & Co
- Robert W. Allard (1919–2003), American geneticist
- Sydney Allard (1910–1966), English founder of Allard Motor Company
- Sven Allard (1896–1975), Swedish diplomat
- Tracy Allard (born 1970/1971), Canadian politician
- Wayne Allard (born 1943), member of the Republican Party and former United States Senator

== In fiction ==
- Kent Allard, pulp magazine character as The Shadow

== See also ==
- Alard (surname)
- Ballard (surname)
- Callard (surname)
- Hallard (surname)
- Gallard (surname)
- Mallard (surname)
- Ollard
- Tallard
