= Adlard =

Adlard is an English surname, most common in Norfolk and Lincolnshire, and derived from the given name Adelard as is the more common name Allard.

Notable people with the surname include:

- Charlie Adlard (born 1966), English comics artist
- Mark Adlard (born 1932), English science fiction writer
- Robert Adlard (1915–2008), British field hockey player
- Steve Adlard (1950–2018), British footballer
