= Sydney central business district =

Part of Sydney, New South Wales, Australia

Sydney CBD
- Suburb
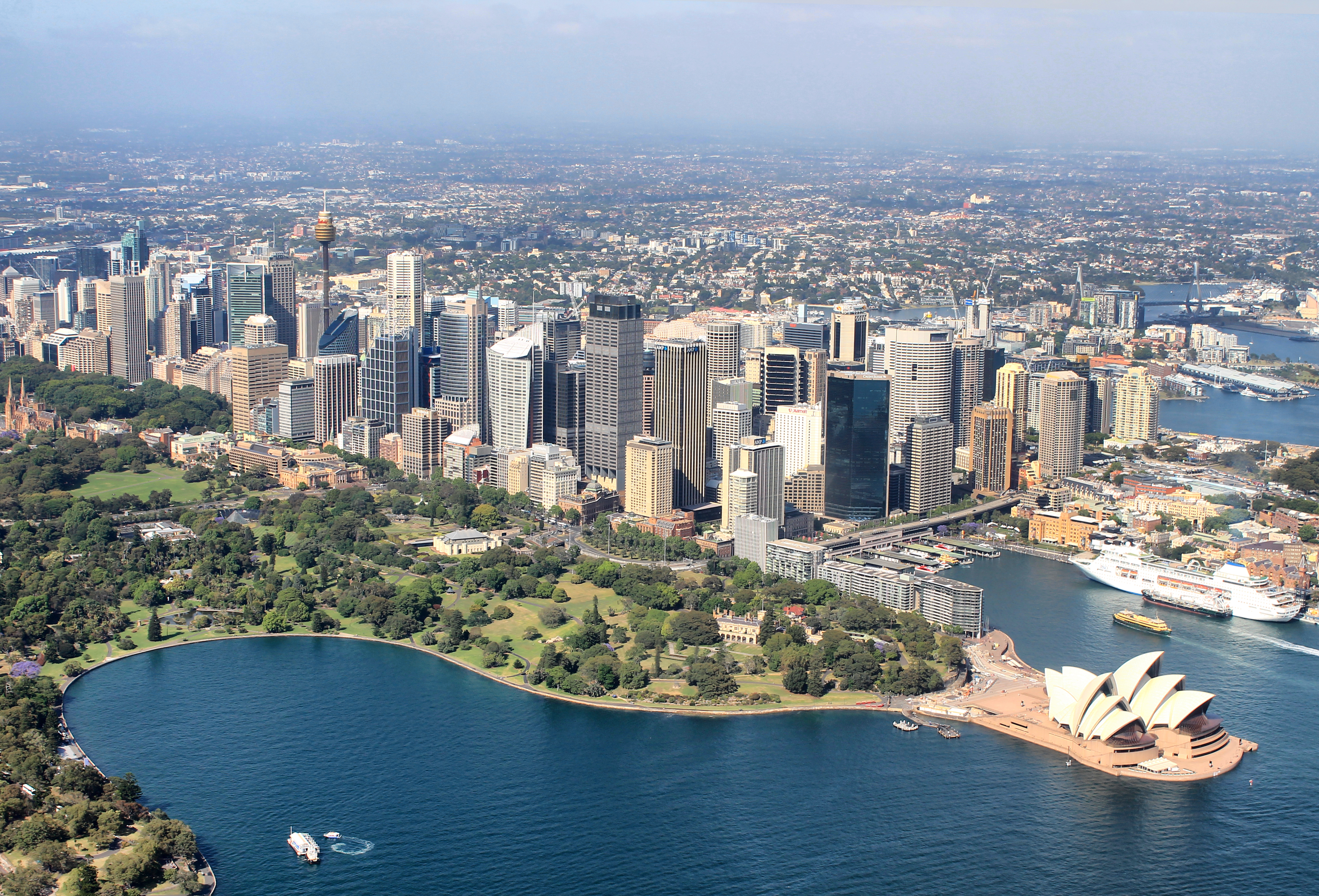
- Sydney CBD from the air, 2014

- Interactive map of Sydney CBD
- Coordinates: 33°52′08″S 151°12′30″E
- Country: Australia
- State: New South Wales
- City: Sydney
- LGA: City of Sydney

Government
  - State electorate: Sydney
  - Federal division: Sydney

Area
  - Total: 2.94 km^{2} (1.14 sq mi)
- Elevation: 58 m (190 ft)

Population
  - Total: 16,667 (SAL 2021)
  - Density: 5,669/km^{2} (14,680/sq mi)
- Postcode: 2000
Suburbs around Sydney CBD
Barangaroo	Millers Point; The Rocks	Port Jackson
Pyrmont	Sydney CBD	Woolloomooloo; Darlinghurst
Ultimo	Haymarket; Ultimo	Surry Hills

The Sydney central business district (CBD) is the historical and main commercial centre of Sydney. The CBD is Sydney's city centre, or Sydney City, and the two terms are used interchangeably. Colloquially, the CBD or city centre is often referred to simply as "Town" or "the City".

The Sydney CBD is Australia's main financial and economic centre, as well as a leading hub of economic activity for the Asia Pacific region. 40.7% of businesses in the CBD fall within the ‘Finance and Financial Services’ or ‘Professional and Business services’ category. It is ranked overall #16 in the 2024 Oxford's Global Cities Index and amongst the top 10 cities in the Human Capital category. Approximately 15% of Sydney's total workforce is employed within the CBD. In 2012, the number of workers operating in the city was 226,972. Based on industry mix and relative occupational wage levels it is estimated that economic activity (GDP) generated in the city in 2023/24 was approximately $142 billion.

Culturally, the city centre is Sydney's focal point for nightlife and entertainment, and is also home to some of the city's most culturally significant buildings and structures.

== History ==
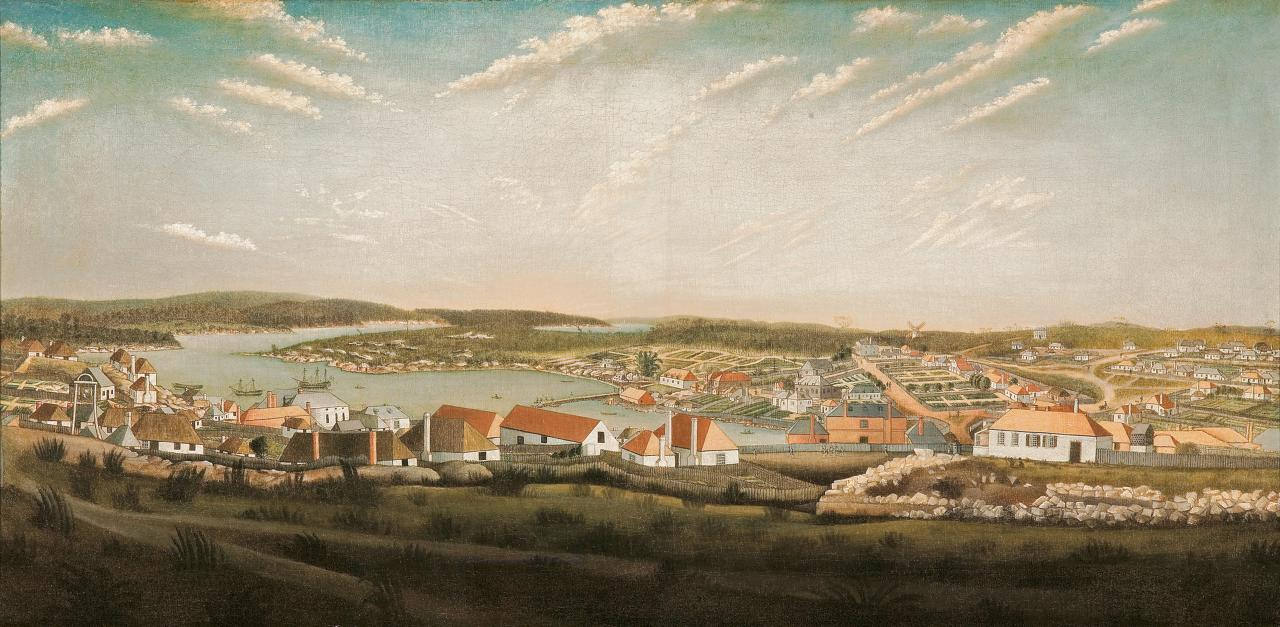
The Sydney colony (c. 1799)

Sydney's history begins in prehistoric times with the occupation of the district by Australian Aboriginals, whose ancestors came to Sydney in the Upper Paleolithic period. Radiocarbon dating suggests that they lived in and around Sydney for at least 30,000 years. Sydney Cove from Port Jackson to Petersham was inhabited by the Cadigal clan. The principal language groups were Darug, Guringai, and Dharawal. The modern history of the city began with the arrival of a First Fleet of British ships in 1788 and the foundation of a penal colony by Great Britain. The area surrounding Port Jackson (Sydney Harbour) was home to several Aboriginal tribes. The "Eora people" are the coastal Aboriginal people of the Sydney district. The name Eora simply means "here" or "from this place", and was used by Local Aboriginal people to describe to the British where they came from.

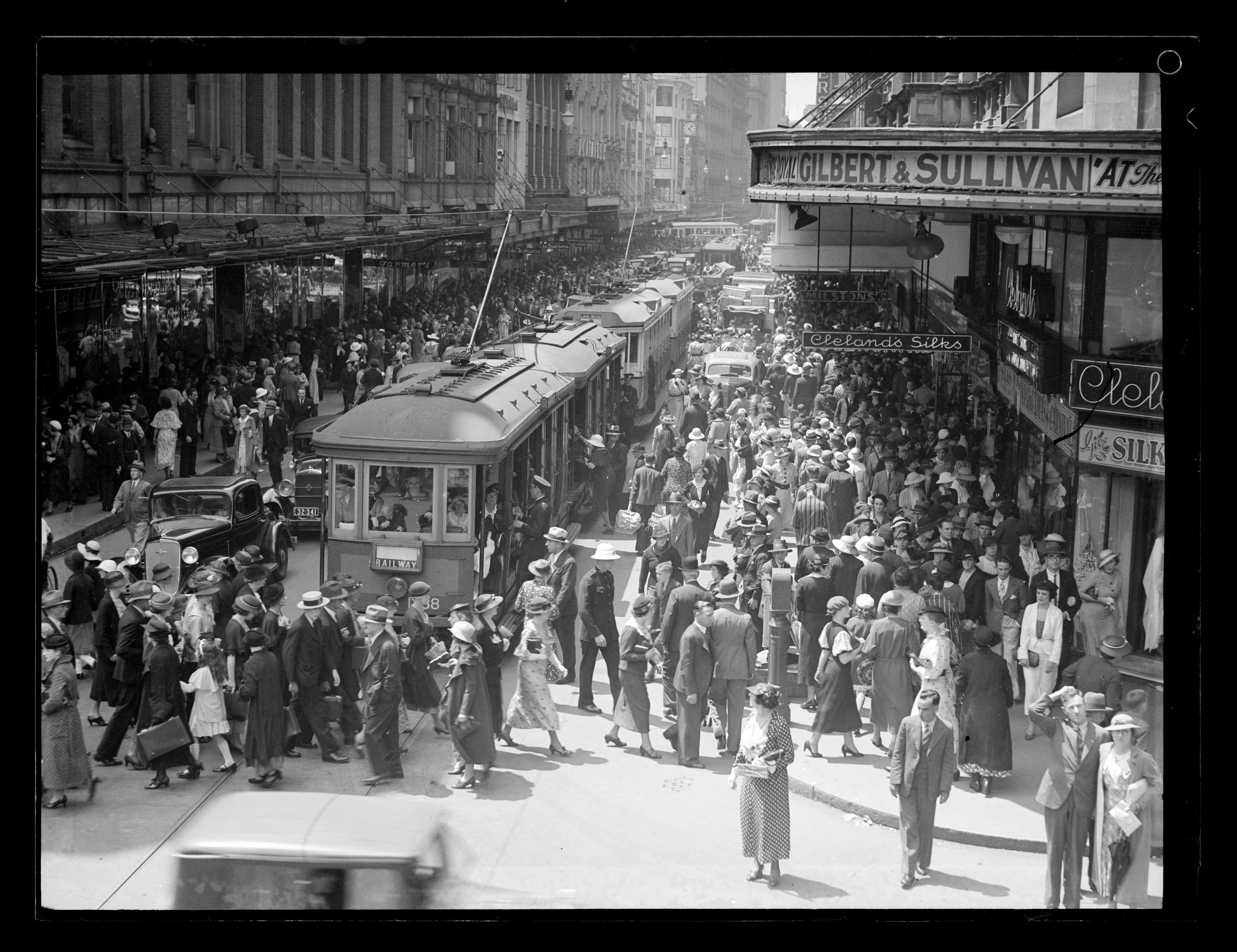
A tram passes through a crowd of people during lunch hour, Pitt Street, 1937.

After arriving to Botany Bay, Captain Arthur Phillip decided that the area was not suitable since it had poor soil, no secure anchorage and no reliable water source. Thus, the fleet moved to the more suitable Port Jackson where a settlement was established at Sydney Cove on 26 January 1788. This date later became Australia's national day, Australia Day. The colony was formally proclaimed by Governor Phillip on 7 February 1788 at Sydney. Sydney Cove offered a fresh water supply and Port Jackson a safe harbour, which Phillip described as: "being without exception the finest Harbour in the World". With the expansion of European settlement large amounts of land was cleared for farming, which resulted in the destruction of Aboriginal food sources. This, combined with the introduction of new diseases such as smallpox, caused resentment within the Aboriginal clans against the British and resulted in violent confrontations.

The oldest legislative body in Australia, the New South Wales Legislative Council, was created in Sydney in 1825 as an appointed body to advise the Governor of New South Wales. The northern wing of Macquarie Street's's Rum Hospital was requisitioned and converted to accommodate the first Parliament House in 1829, as it was the largest building available in Sydney at the time. In 1840 the Sydney City Council was established. Australia's first parliamentary elections were conducted for the New South Wales Legislative Council in 1843.

Market Street in January 1986, showing Sydney Tower and the now defunct Sydney Monorail

Macquarie set aside a large portion of land for an Anglican Cathedral and laid the foundation stone for the first St Mary's Catholic Cathedral in 1821. St Andrew's Anglican Cathedral, though more modest in size than Macquarie's original vision, later began construction and, after fire and setbacks, the present St Mary's Catholic Cathedral foundation stone was laid in 1868, from which rose a towering gothic-revival landmark. Religious groups were also responsible for many of the philanthropic activities in Sydney. One of these was the Sydney Female Refuge Society set up to care for prostitutes in 1848. An academy of art formed in 1870 and the present Art Gallery of New South Wales building began construction in 1896. Inspired by the works of French impressionism, artists camps formed around the foreshores of Sydney Harbour in the 1880s. The Romanesque landmark Queen Victoria Building (QVB), designed by George McRae, was completed in 1898 on the site of the old Sydney markets.

In the midst of World War I, on Valentine's Day, riots racked the CBD, in what has come to be known as the Central Station Riots of 1916. A substantial segment of the violence was concentrated in the Central area. These riots involved five thousand military recruits who refused to comply with extraneous parade orders. During the riots, they caused significant damage to buildings. People with "foreign" names were especially targeted. The recruits clashed with soldiers, resulting in the death of Private Ernest William Keefe. Eight people sustained injuries. Because this incident occurred in the middle of the Great War the state discouraged media coverage. Only a fifth of the rioters were court-marshalled. These riots spurred the introduction of lockout laws for pubs after 6 pm. This law was only lifted in 1955.

== Geography ==
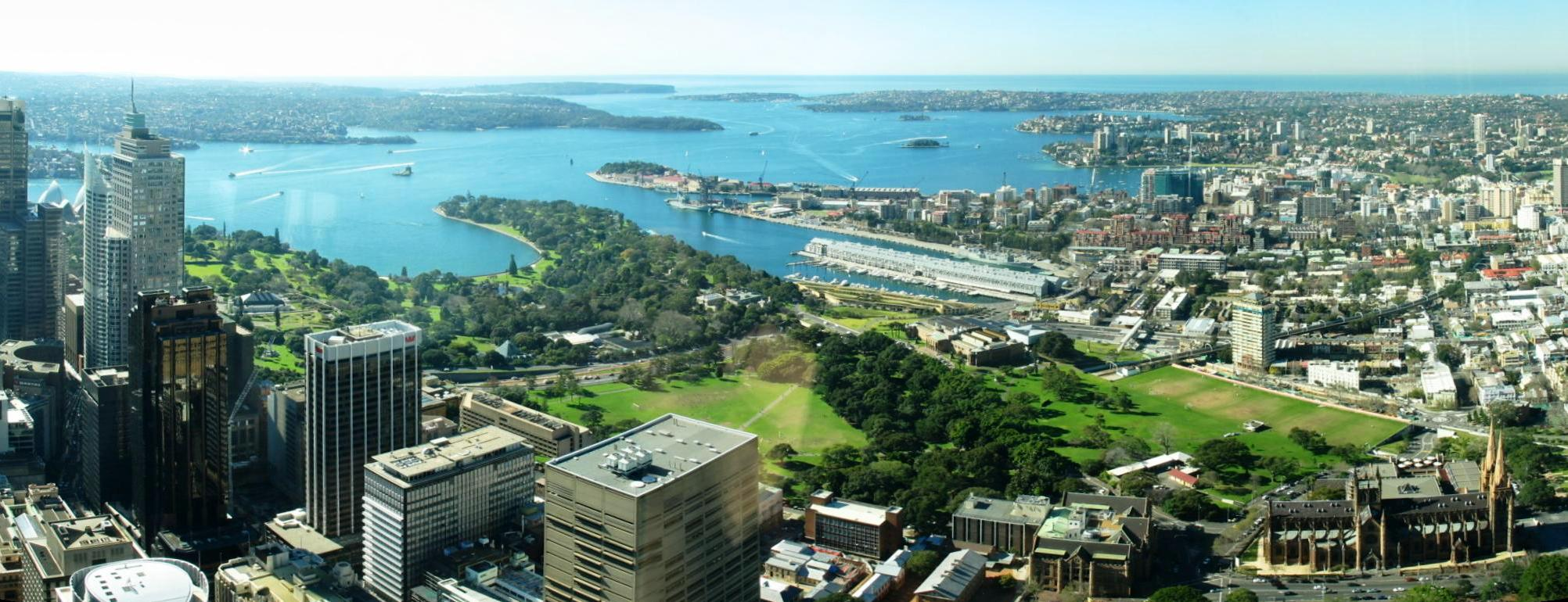
The Central Business District is surrounded by parks including Hyde Park, The Royal Botanic Garden, The Domain and Tumbalong Park. (2003)

The Sydney CBD is an area of very densely concentrated skyscrapers and other buildings, interspersed by several parks such as Hyde Park, The Domain, Royal Botanic Garden and Wynyard Park.

Geographically, its north–south axis runs from Circular Quay in the north to Central railway station in the south. Its east–west axis runs from a chain of parkland that includes Hyde Park, The Domain, Royal Botanic Garden and Farm Cove on Sydney Harbour in the east; to Darling Harbour and the Western Distributor in the west.

The CBD runs along two ridge lines below Macquarie Street and York Streets. Between these ridges is Pitt Street, running close to the course of the original Tank Stream (now tunneled). George Street is the Sydney CBD's main north–south thoroughfare. Bridge Street took its name from the bridge running east–west that once crossed this stream. Martin Place is the banking and commercial heart of Sydney whereas Pitt Street is the retail heart of the city and includes the Pitt Street Mall as well as the Sydney Tower. Macquarie Street is a historic precinct that houses such buildings as the State Parliament House and the Supreme Court of New South Wales.

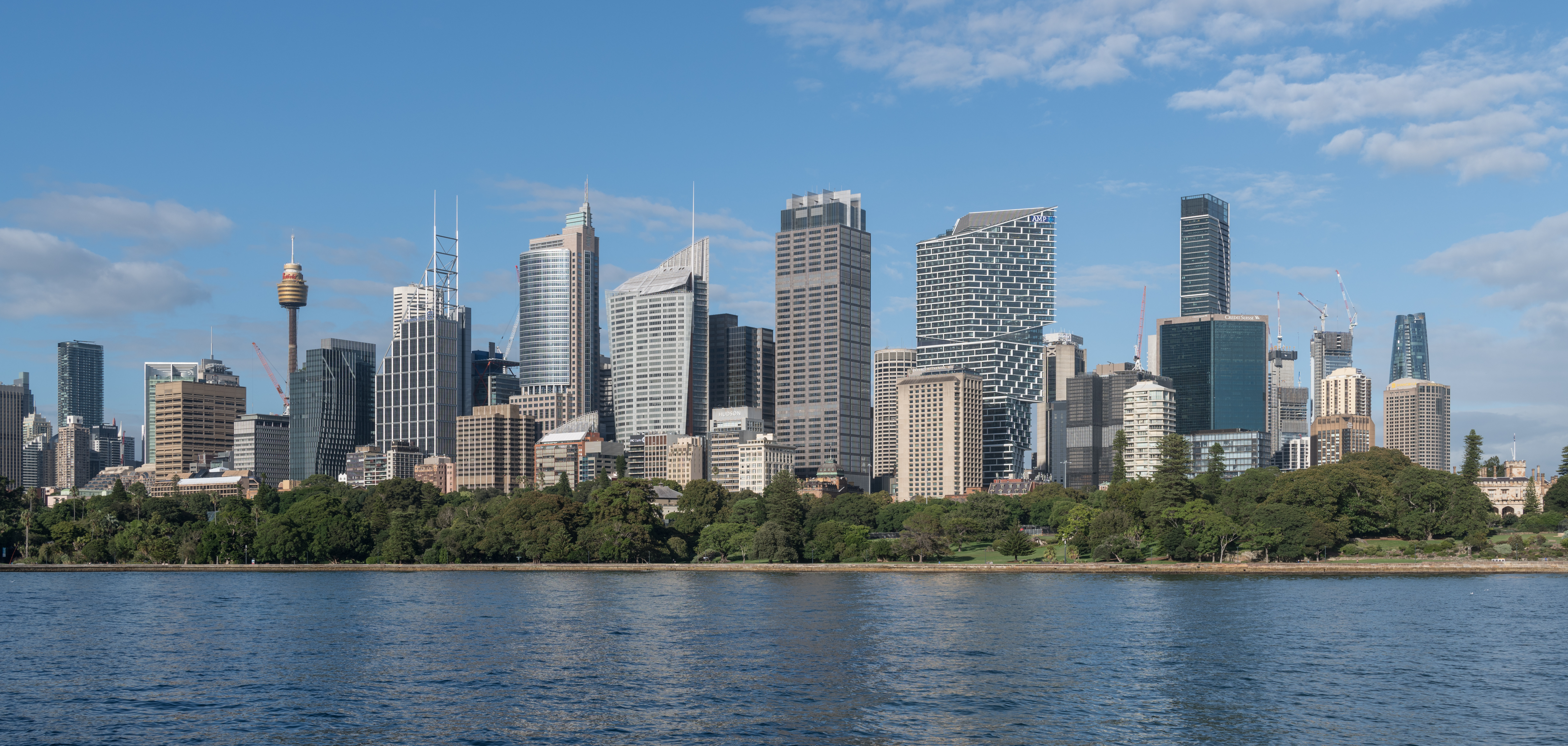
The skyline of the central business district, 2023

=== Boundaries ===
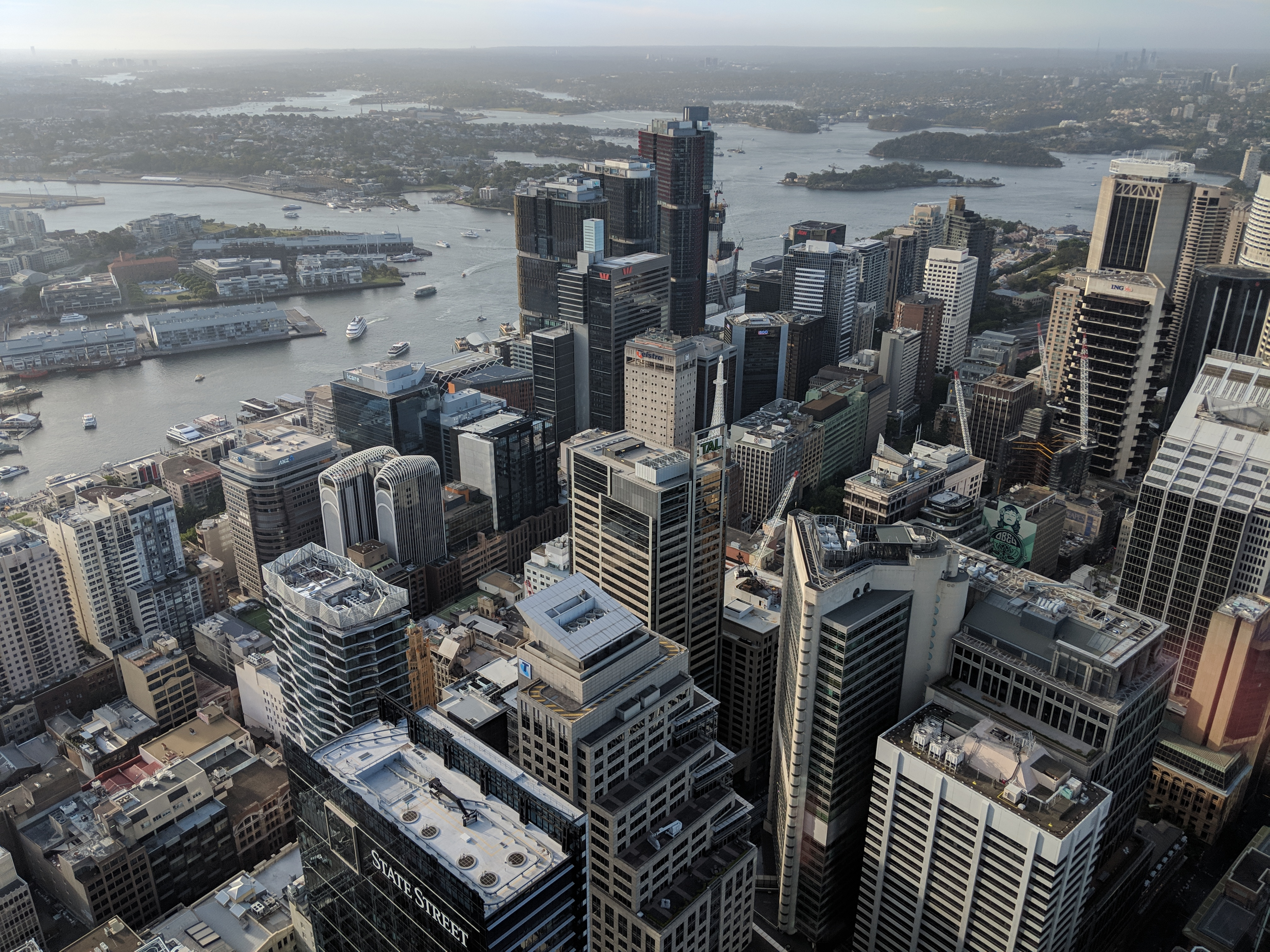
The northwestern end of the Sydney CBD as viewed from Sydney Tower. 2018

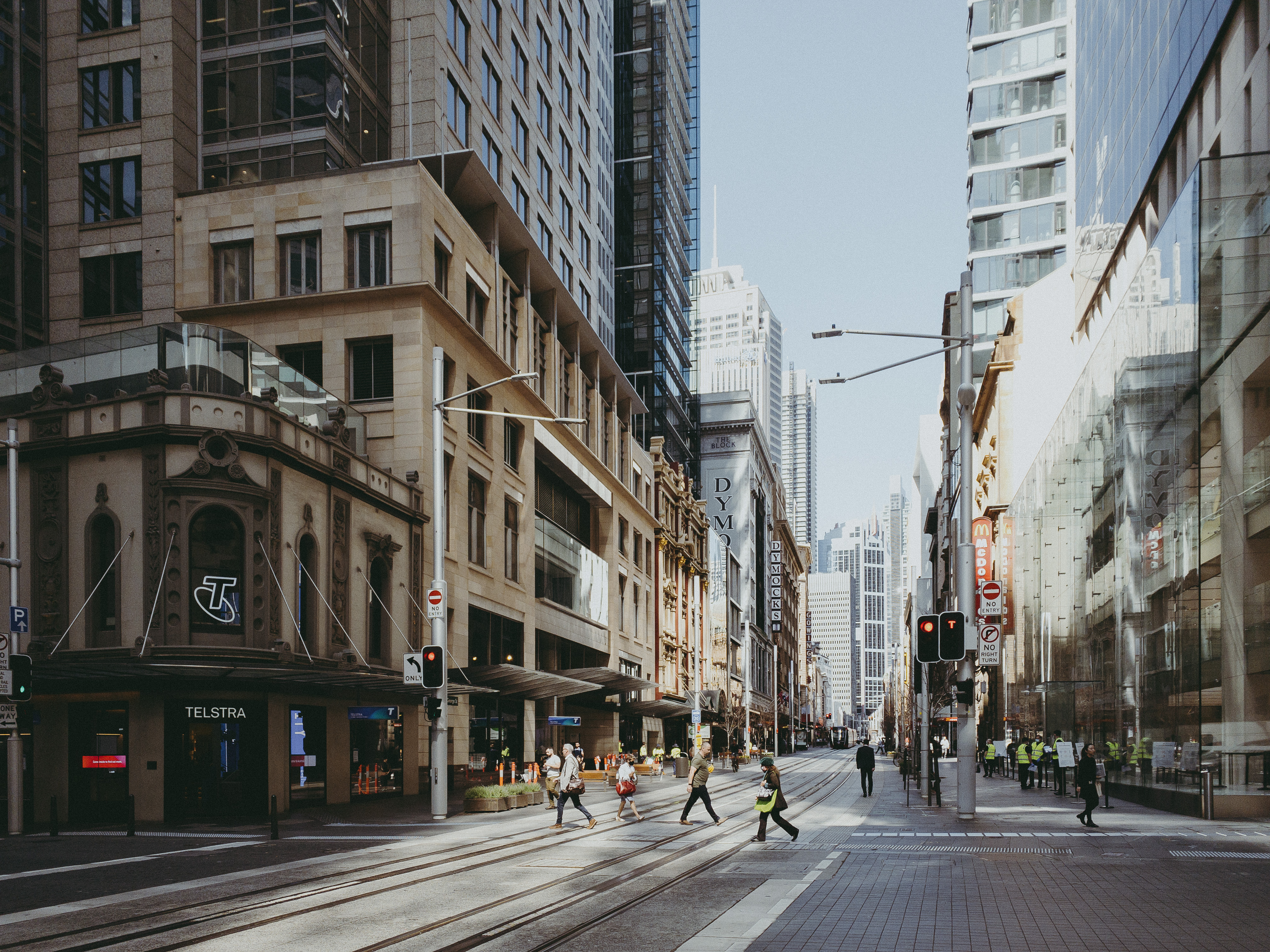
George Street, the main CBD thoroughfare. 2020

The Geographical Names Board defines the area covering the central business district as the suburb named "Sydney". The formal boundaries of the suburb "Sydney" covers most of the peninsula formed by Cockle Bay in the west and Woolloomooloo Bay in the east. It extends north to Circular Quay, Bennelong Point and Mrs Macquarie's Chair, east to Woolloomooloo Bay and the eastern boundary of the Domain and Hyde Park, south to Goulburn Street just north of Sydney's Chinatown (Haymarket), and west to cover the Darling Harbour area on the western shore of Cockle Bay. However, it does not include the northwestern portion of the peninsula which includes the Barangaroo, The Rocks, Millers Point, Dawes Point and Walsh Bay area, which are formally separate suburbs grouped by the City of Sydney into the "small area" called "The Rocks - Miller's Point - Dawe's Point".

The City of Sydney defines the CBD as comprising two of its ten "villages" – CBD and Harbour Village & Chinatown and CBD South Village.

- CBD and Harbour Village is bounded by the shoreline of Port Jackson in the north, Lincoln Crescent, Sir John Young Crescent, The Domain and College Street in the east, Liverpool Street, Elizabeth Street, Bathurst Street and the Western Distributor in the south, and Darling Harbour in the west.
- Chinatown and CBD South Village is bounded by the Pyrmont Bay Wharf, Darling Harbour, the Western Distributor and Bathurst Street in the north, Elizabeth Street, Liverpool Street, Wentworth Avenue, Elizabeth Street and Chalmers Street in the east, Devonshire Street Tunnel, Lee Street and Railway Square in the south, and the railway line, Pyrmont Street, Murray Street and Pirrama Road in the west.

The postcode zone 2000 is also roughly correlative with the city centre.

== Governance ==
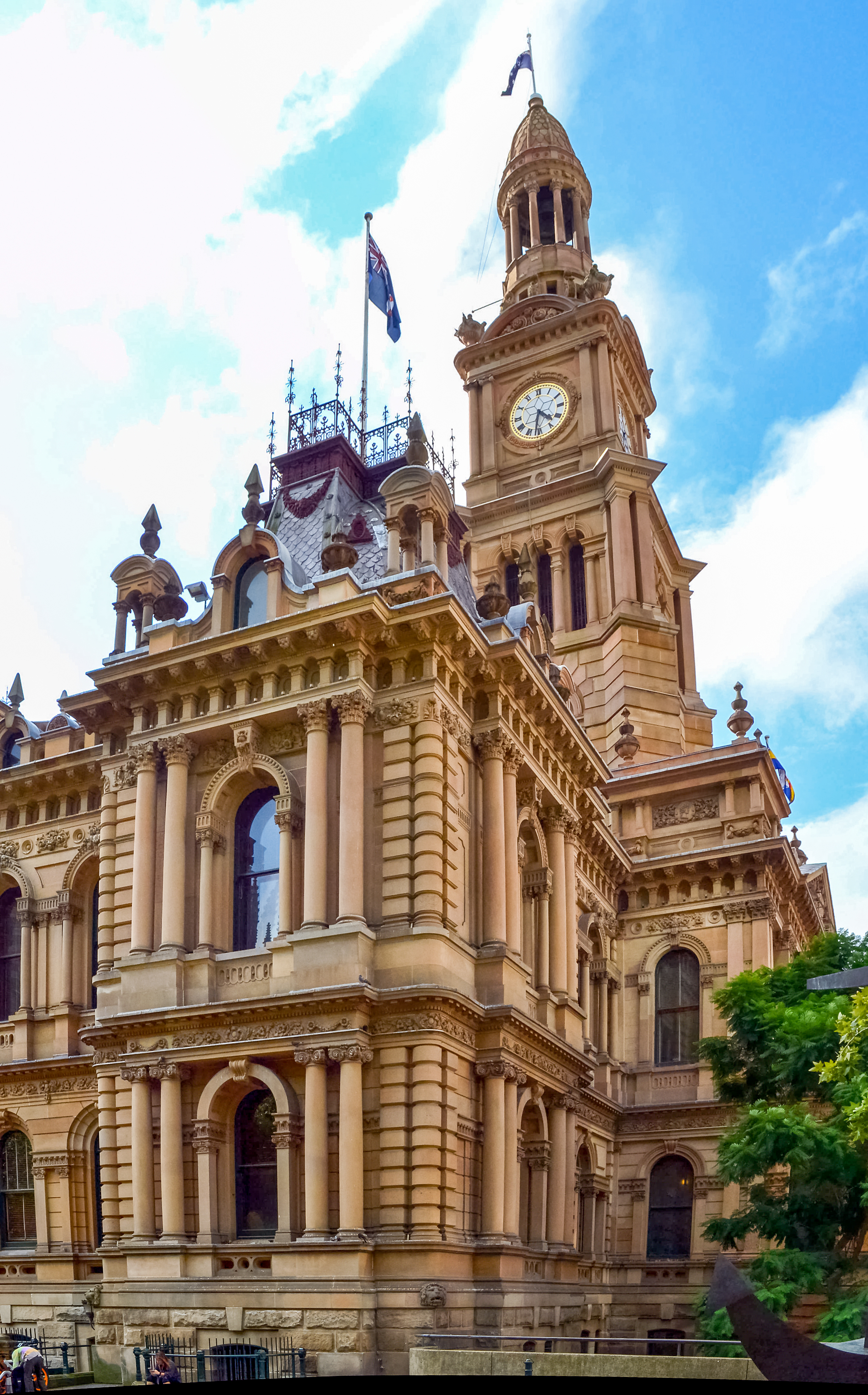
The Sydney Town Hall. 2019

Administratively, the Sydney CBD falls under the authority of the local government area of the City of Sydney. The New South Wales state government also has authority over some aspects of the CBD, in particular through Property NSW.

In the New South Wales state parliament, the seat of "Sydney" covers the city centre together with inner western, southern and eastern suburbs. Independent Alex Greenwich has represented the state seat of Sydney since the 2012 by-election, triggered by the resignation of previous independent Clover Moore, who was the Lord Mayor of Sydney, due to introduced state laws preventing dual membership of state parliament and local council.

In the federal parliament, the seat of "Sydney" covers the city centre together with a larger set of inner western, southern and eastern suburbs, as well as islands in the Sydney Harbour and Lord Howe Island. Australian Labor Party member Tanya Plibersek has represented the federal seat of Sydney since the 1998 Australian federal election.

== Precincts ==
=== Culture ===
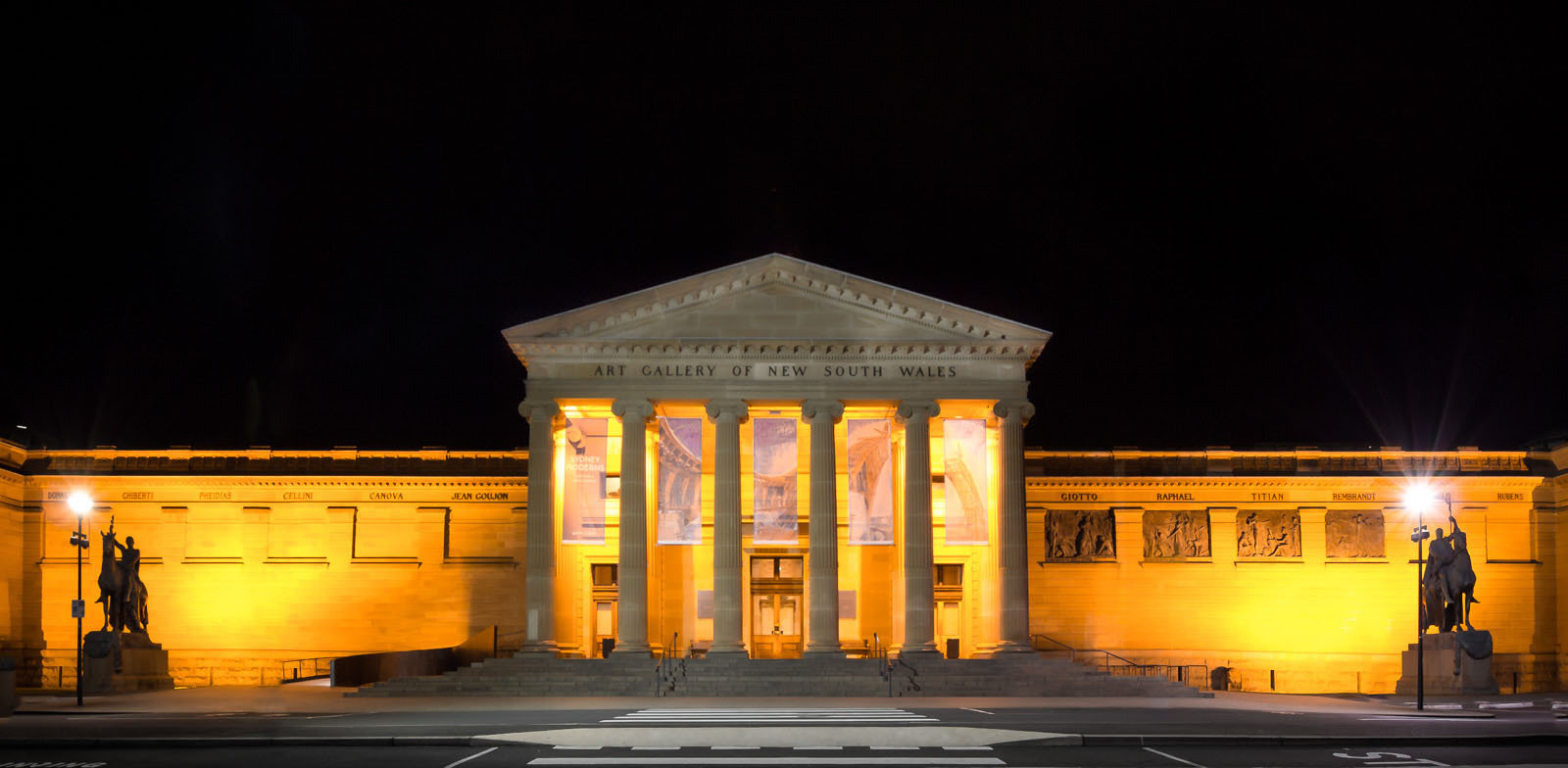
The Art Gallery of New South Wales. Facade of the Naala Nura building and entrance designed by Walter Vernon. 2013

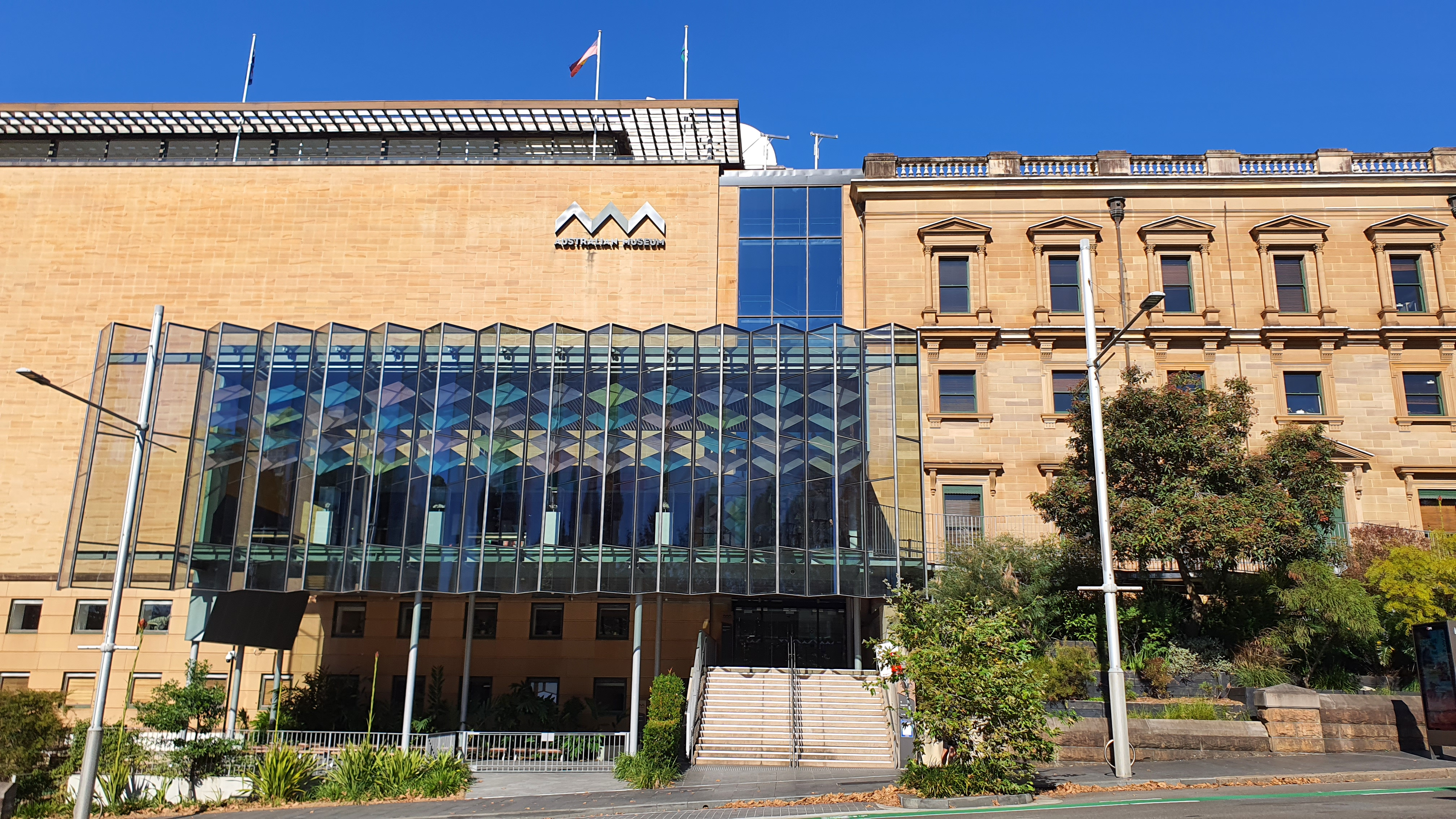
The Australian Museum on the corner of William and College street, is the oldest natural history museum in Australia and the fifth oldest natural history museum in the world. 2023

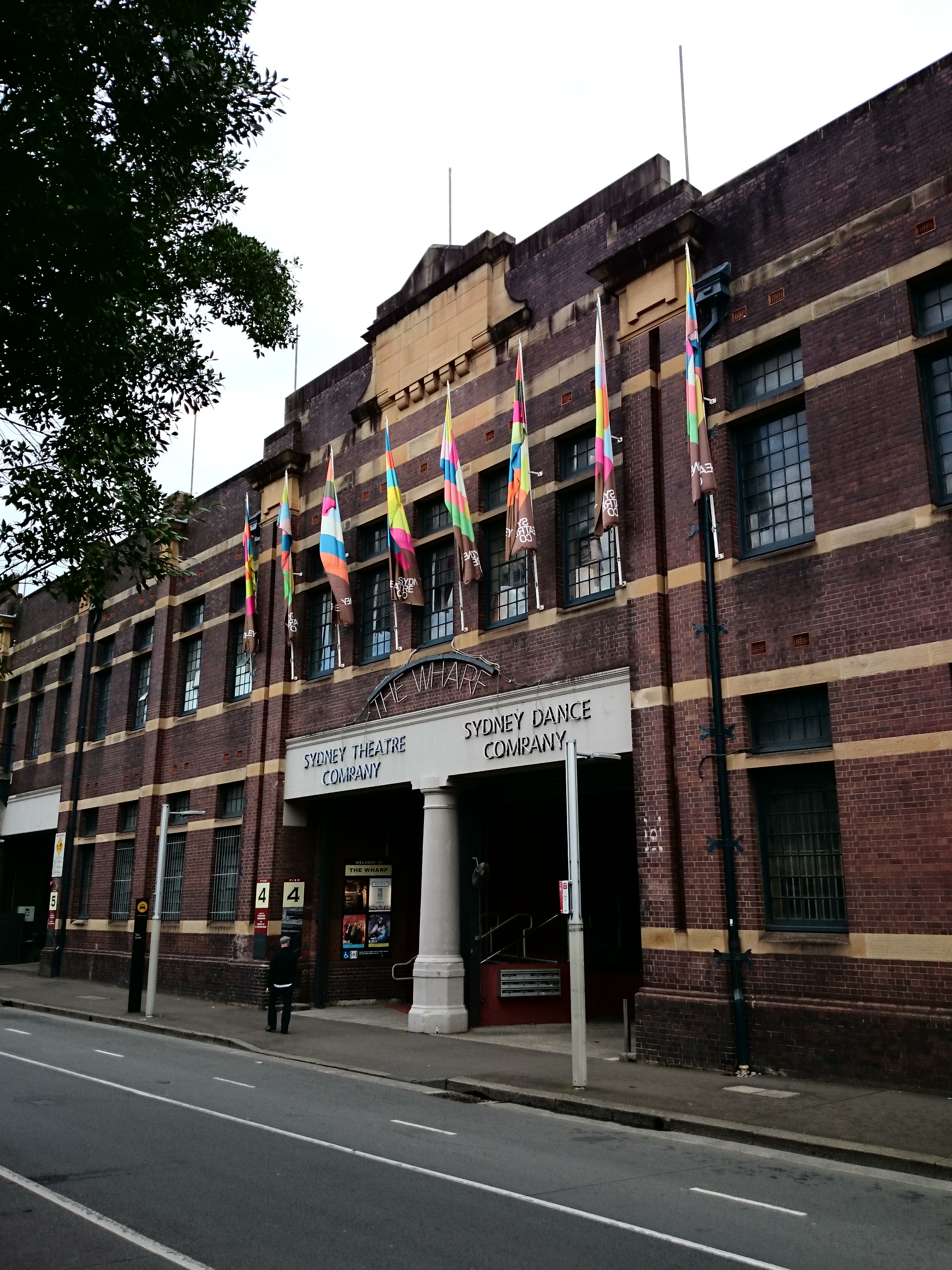
The Wharf Theatres in Pier 4/5 Dawes Point, host performances by numerous cultural groups including the Sydney Theatre Company and the Sydney Dance Company. 2014

Sydney's cultural centre is compacted within its central business district and inner city ring, due to its nightlife, pedestrian traffic and centrality of notable attractions. There is a large concentration of cultural institutions within the CBD including: the Museum of Sydney, the State Library of New South Wales, the Customs House branch of the City of Sydney Library, the Theatre Royal, the City Recital Hall and the Japan Foundation. There are a total of 19 churches located in the Sydney city centre.

Many other cultural institutions are located at the surrounds of the CBD, such as: the Sydney Opera House and the Museum of Contemporary Art to the north, the Australian Museum and the Art Gallery of New South Wales to the east, the Powerhouse Museum to the west, White Rabbit Gallery and the Haymarket branch of the City of Sydney Library to the south. The lanes and alleyways of Sydney exhibit the culture and arts of the CBD.

Every January during the summer, the city celebrates with the Sydney Festival. Australian and International theatre during the month is also featured, including Aboriginal, and Contemporary.

The Sydney Film Festival is an international event organised every year in June at various venues across the CBD. The festival opened on 11 June 1954 and was held over four days, with screenings at Sydney University. Attendance was at full capacity with 1,200 tickets sold at one guinea each.

Sydney has a lively café culture, as well as a club and bar scene distributed throughout the CBD and concentrated in a couple of locations such as Darling Harbour. Although Kings Cross is not technically located within the Sydney CBD, it is accessible via William Street, which runs through Hyde Park and is part of the inner-city region. Oxford Street hosts Sydney's gay scene.

=== Civic ===
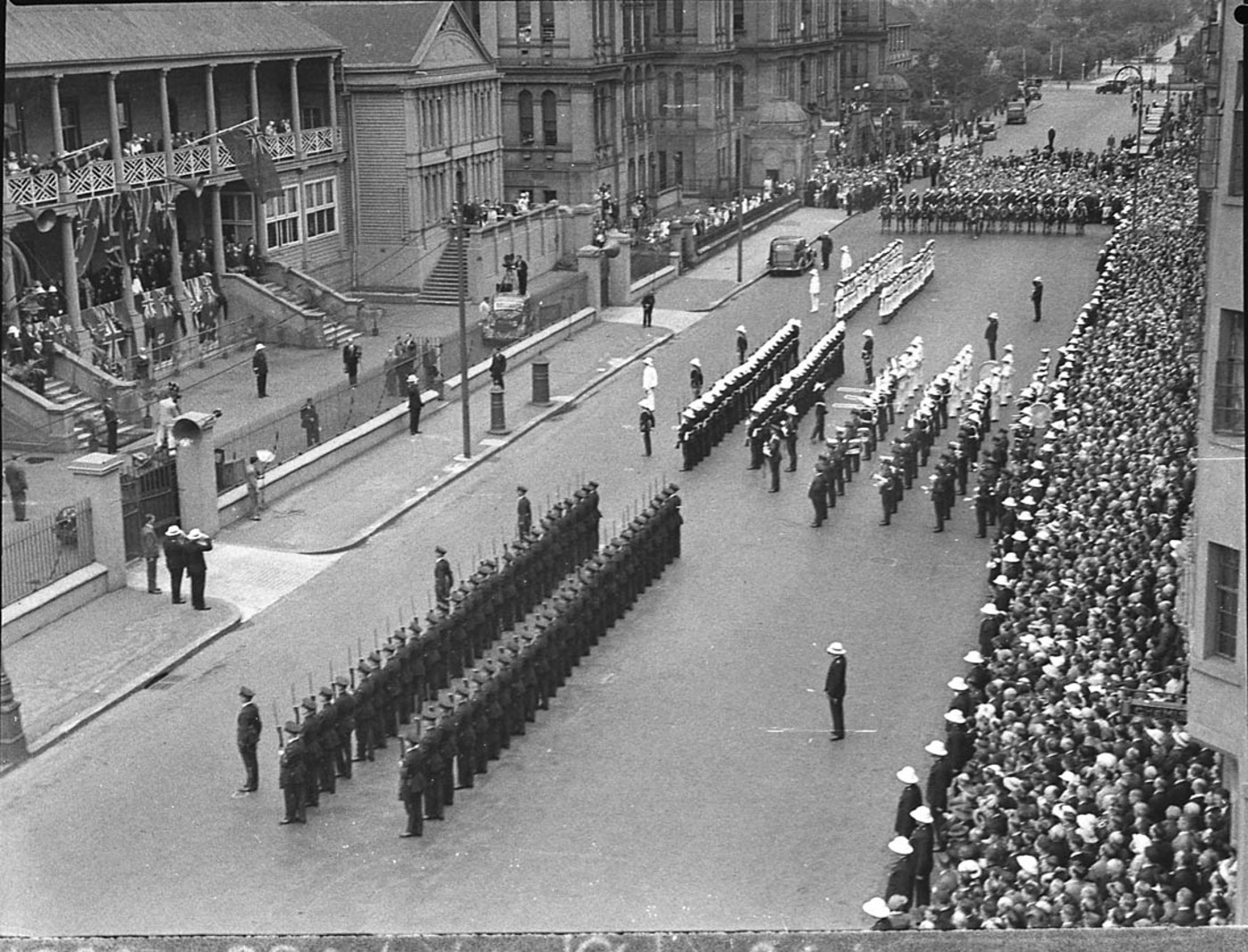
Proclamation of King George VI at Parliament House along Macquarie Street

Macquarie Street is a historic precinct and where many local as well as federal governmental institutions reside. "Macquarie Street" is often used as a metonym for the New South Wales government (the way Whitehall, for example, is a metonym for the British government). Parliament House, Government House, and the Law Courts Building (which houses the Supreme Court of New South Wales) are all located along the street. Federal Government institutions located along this street include the Federal Court of Australia and High Court of Australia, and the headquarters of the Reserve Bank of Australia.

=== Justice ===
The primary legal precinct of Sydney is located in Queens Square, Sydney where the Joint Law Courts Building on Phillip Street accommodates the High Court of Australia, Federal Court of Australia and the Supreme Court of New South Wales. Also located in this precinct are the UNESCO World Heritage Listed Hyde Park Barracks and the Sydney Law School.

=== Retail ===
Pitt Street Mall is the pedestrianised section of Pitt Street in the Sydney CBD running one block long between Market Street and King Street. It is one of Australia's busiest and most cosmopolitan shopping precincts with many flagship chain stores and more than 500 specialty stores. As one of Sydney's main shopping streets, rents are correspondingly the highest in Australia, and the fourth highest in the world in terms of city streets with CBRE Group rating Pitt Street Mall as the second most expensive street for retail rents in the world, second only to New York City's Fifth Avenue.

=== Banking and Commercial ===
The Sydney CBD is home to some of the largest Australian companies, as well as serving as an Asia-Pacific headquarters for many large international companies. Martin Place is considered to be the financial hub of the CBD and is also where the Australian Securities Exchange is located, the Australian government’s central bank (the Reserve Bank of Australia) head office is also there. Martin Place has also been dubbed 'Silicon Place' with global tech giants Amazon, Microsoft, LinkedIn, Expedia and Atlassian.

The financial services industry in particular occupies much of the available office space in the CBD, with companies such as the Westpac, Commonwealth Bank, Citibank, Deutsche Bank, Macquarie Bank, AMP, Insurance Australia Group, Aon, Marsh McLennan, Allianz, HSBC, Axa, ABN Amro, Royal Bank of Canada and Bloomsbury Publishing all having offices.

== Transport ==
Sydney's CBD is serviced by interstate rail, suburban rail, urban rail, light rail, bus and ferry transportation systems.

=== Rail ===
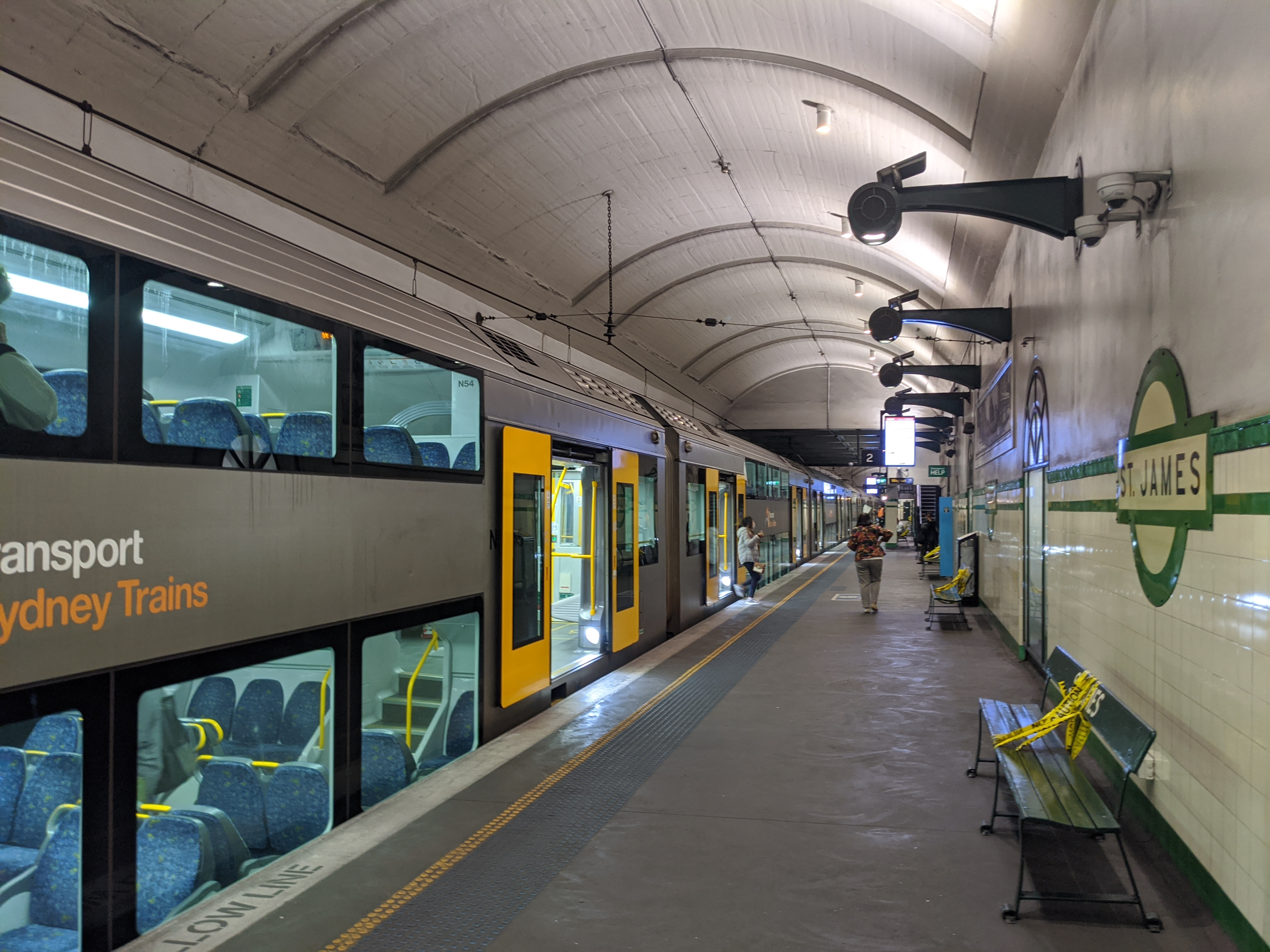
St James station; one of six underground stations in the CBD

Sydney's main commuter rail hub is Central railway station, which is located to the south of the CBD in Haymarket: it connects services for almost all of the lines in the Sydney Trains network, as well as being the terminus for NSW TrainLink country and inter-urban rail services. From Central, there is a largely-underground CBD rail loop, accessed in both directions via Central, which services five CBD stations (Town Hall, Wynyard, Circular Quay, St James and Museum). This is known as the City Circle. In addition, a separate underground line to Bondi Junction services an additional underground station, Martin Place.

The Inner West Light Rail passes immediately to the south of the CBD, connecting Central to nearby suburbs of Sydney's Inner West. The CBD and South East Light Rail runs north–south through the CBD, connecting Circular Quay with Central and the Eastern Suburbs.

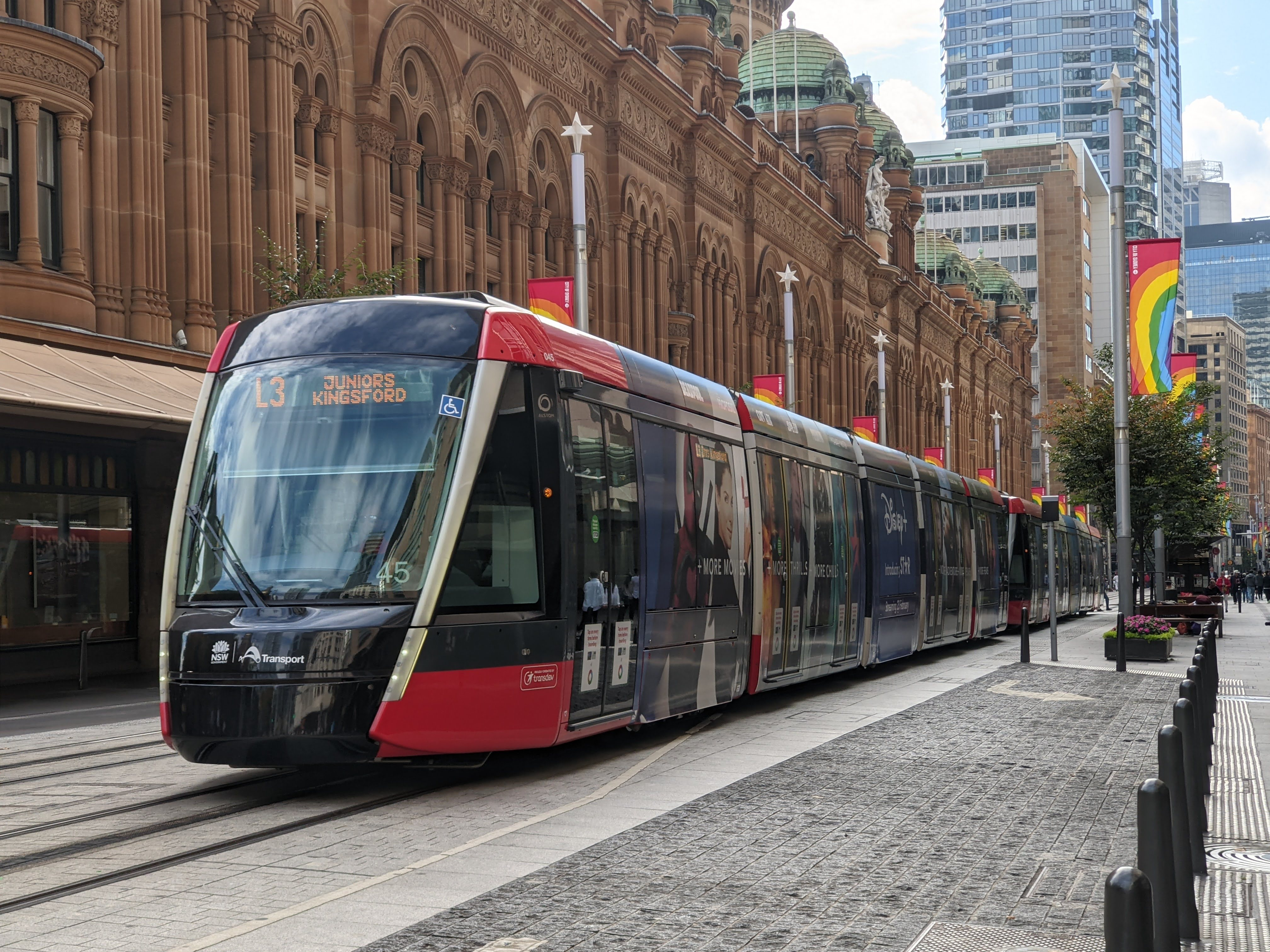
Light rail on George Street 2021.

The Metro North West & Bankstown Line of the Sydney Metro network serves an additional CBD station at Gadigal, as well as the existing Sydney Trains station at Martin Place. Hunter Street station, in the north of the CBD, is under construction as part of Sydney Metro West.

=== Bus ===
Buses service the CBD along several dozen routes to both inner and more remote suburbs. NightRide is an after-hours bus service that operates between midnight and 5:00 am, with most services running from George Street outside the Sydney Town Hall.

=== Ferry ===
Sydney Ferries operate largely from Circular Quay, on the northern edge of the CBD. There are several wharves (directly beneath the elevated Circular Quay commuter rail station), with Wharf 3 operating exclusively to Manly.

== Architecture ==
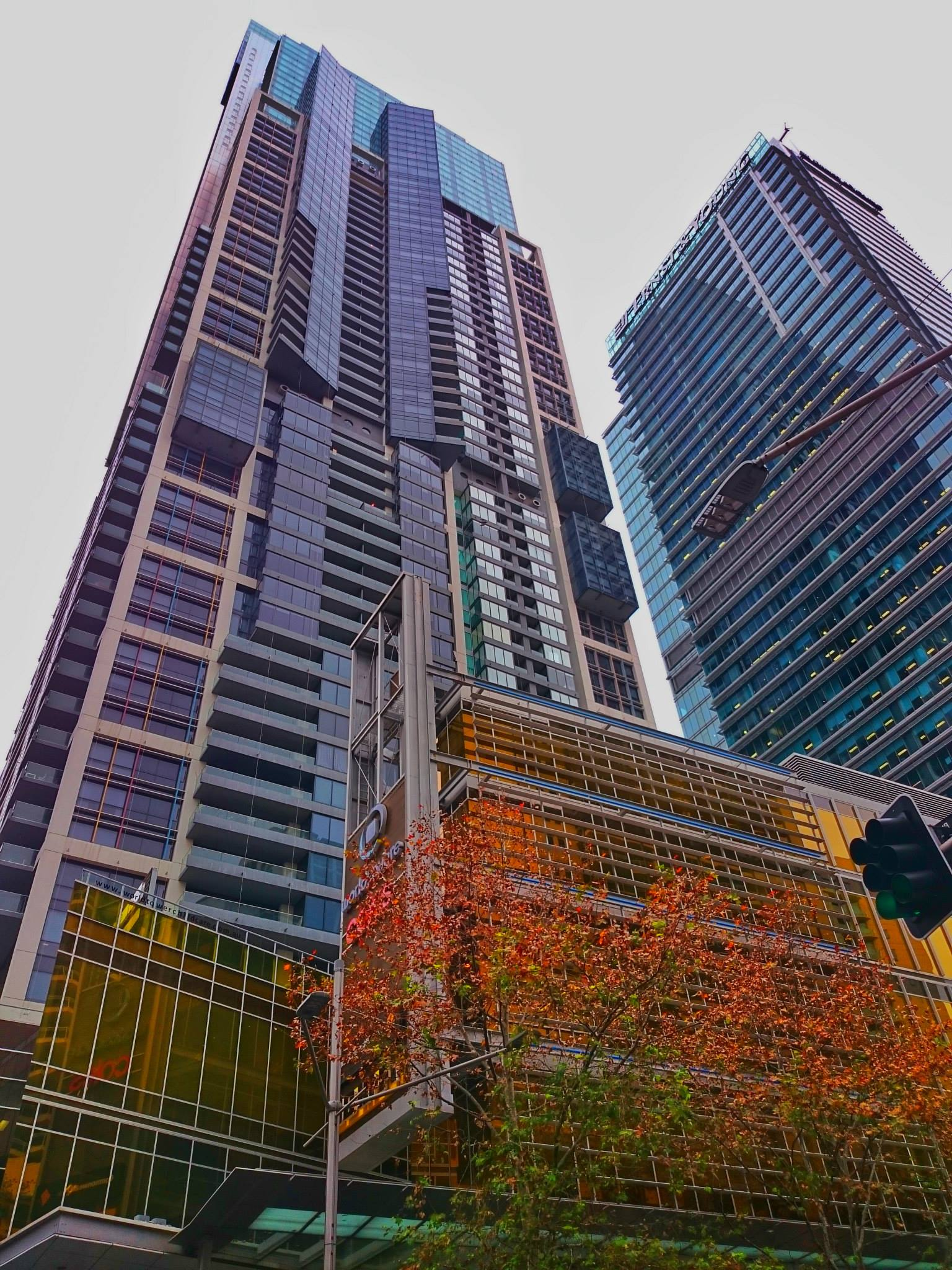
World Square skyscrapers. 2015

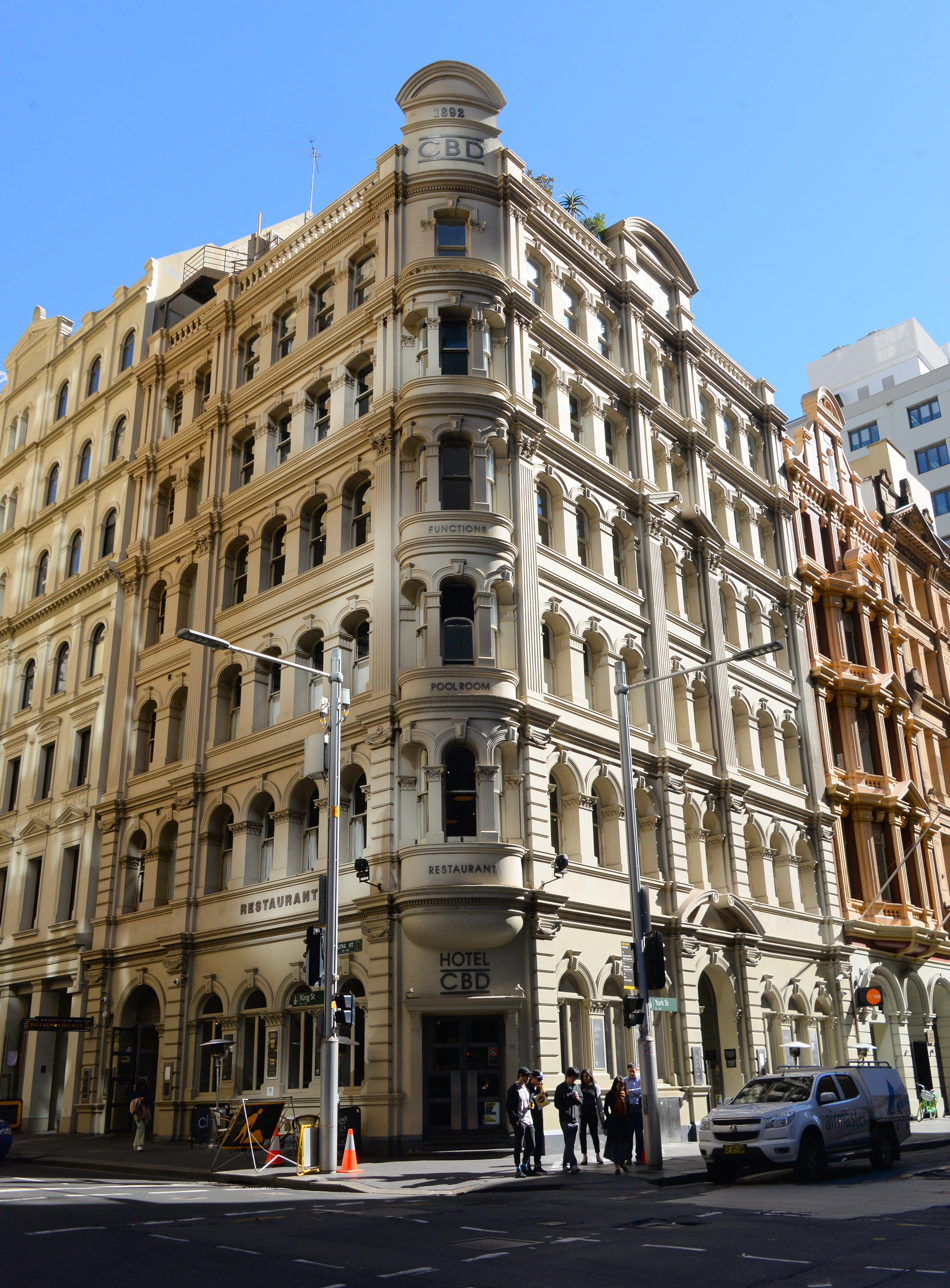
Victorian architecture on York Street

The Sydney CBD contains many of Australia's tallest skyscrapers, including Governor Phillip Tower, 25 Martin Place and World Tower, the latter consisting predominantly of apartments. It is also home to the Australia Square tower building on George Street, which was the city's tallest building until 1976. As of 2017, the tallest structure is Sydney Tower at 309 m (1,014 ft) which has dominated the city skyline since it was topped out in 1981. In 2016, height limits for buildings were lifted from 235 m (771 ft) to 310 m (1,017 ft).

Heritage conservation has been an ongoing issue for Sydney's city centre since the introduction of green bans in the 1970s and the increasing need for office or living space. Since then, a number of prominent buildings in the CBD have been lost: Anthony Hordern & Sons on George Street, the Regent Theatre also on George Street, Commercial Travelers' Club and Hotel Australia at Martin Place all attracted the ire of Sydneysiders–Sydney Mayor Clover Moore, then the MP for Bligh, even addressed a crowd in Martin Place in 1988 in a futile attempt to save the Regent Theatre from its imminent fate.

== Demographics ==
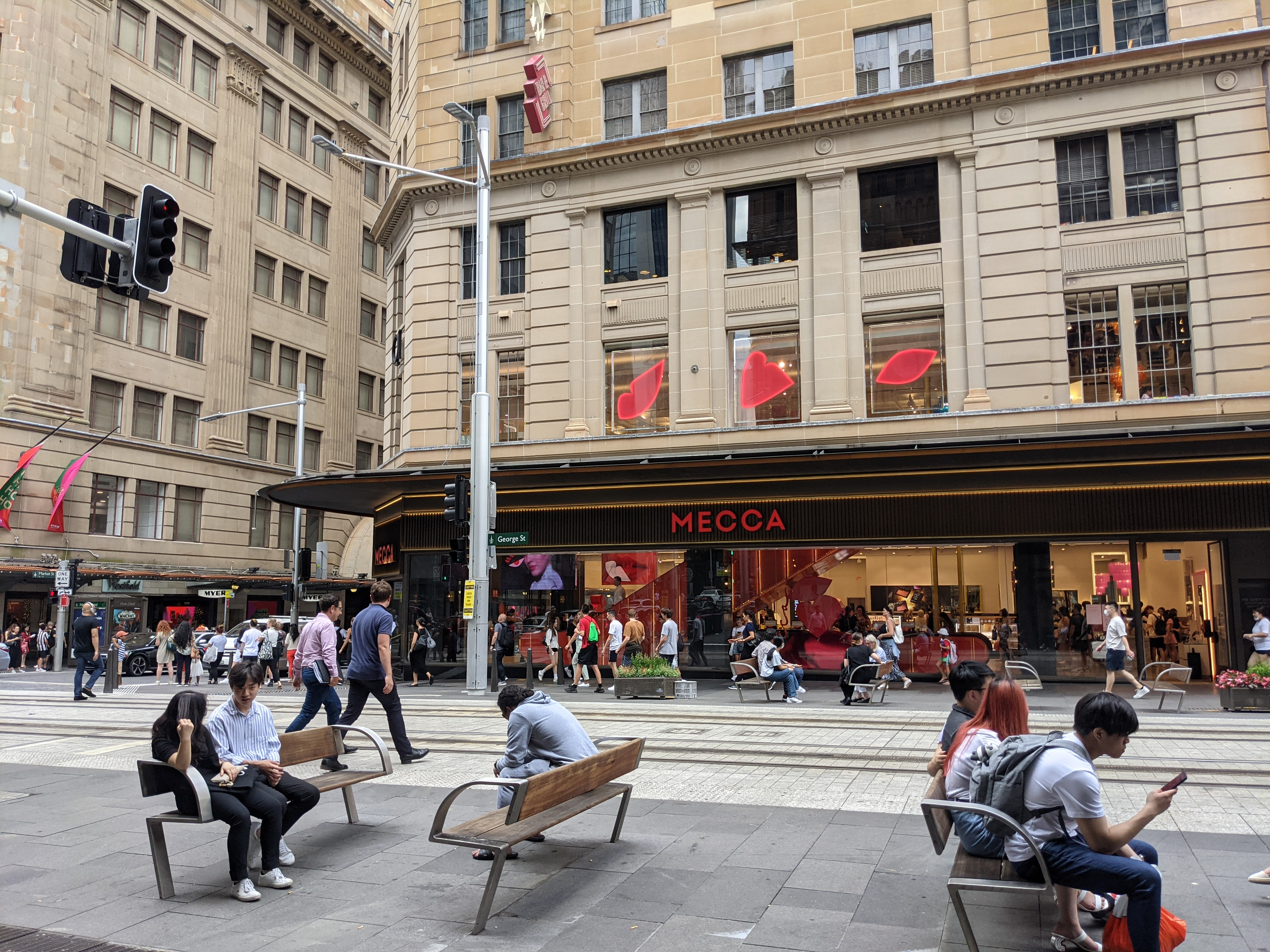
George Street outside the Gowings Building

At the 2021 census, the population of the Sydney CBD was recorded as 27,936. Australia-born individuals make up 22.3% of the CBD's population. The most common countries of birth other than Australia were China 12.7%, Thailand 12.6%, Indonesia 11.1%, India 2.9% and South Korea 2.8%. Aboriginal and/or Torres Strait Islander people made up 0.3% of the population. International students account for 32% of Sydney CBD residents.

Culturally, residents in the CBD have diverse ancestries, with the most common being Chinese 30.8%, English 13.6%, Thai 11.9%, Australian 7.1%, and Indonesian 7.1%. Religious affiliations are equally diverse, with the largest group reporting No Religion 38.0%, followed by Buddhism 21.3%, Catholic 12.9% and Anglican 3.5%. 97.0% of dwellings were flats or apartments. 71.1% were rented and 25.1% were owned outright or with a mortgage in 2021.
