= Gallard =

Gallard is a surname. Notable people with the surname include:

- Esteban Gallard (1901–1929), Cuban boxer
- Jill Gallard (born 1968), British diplomat
- Michel de Gallard (1921–2007), French painter

== See also ==
- Galland
- Hallard
- Mallard (surname)
