= Ellard =

Ellard is a surname and given name. The surname is found in Ireland and England among other places. Notable people with the name include:

== Surname ==
- Brian Ellard (born 1940), Canadian educator, musicologist, arranger, and conductor
- David Ellard (born 1989), Australian rules footballer
- Fraser Ellard (born 1997), American baseball pitcher
- Frederick Ellard (1824–1874), Australian composer
- Henry Ellard (born 1961), former American football wide receiver
- Kelly Ellard, murderer of Reena Virk in Saanich, British Columbia, Canada
- Tom Ellard (born 1962), Australian electronic musician
- William Ellard (born 2006), British swimmer

== Given name ==
- Ellard O'Brien (1930–2011), retired Canadian professional ice hockey player
- Ellard A. Walsh (1887–1975), U.S. National Guard and Army officer

== See also ==
- Ellard, Mississippi, an unincorporated community
- Bayley-Ellard High School, Roman Catholic secondary school in Madison, New Jersey
- Allard
- Bellard
- Wellard
