= Mallard (disambiguation) =

A mallard is a type of duck.

Mallard may also refer to:

== Vehicles ==
- LNER Class A4 4468 Mallard, the fastest steam locomotive ever, reaching 126 miles per hour (203 km/h)
- Grumman G-73 Mallard, an amphibious aircraft of the late 1940s
- Advanced Aeromarine Mallard, an aircraft
- HMS Mallard, the name of four ships of the Royal Navy
- USS Mallard, either of two United States naval ships

== Music ==
- Mallard (band)
  - Mallard (album), 1975
- Mallard Song, an ancient tradition of All Souls College, Oxford

== Places in the United States ==
- Mallard (Charlotte neighborhood), in Charlotte, North Carolina
- Mallard, Iowa
- Mallard, Minnesota, an abandoned town site
- Point Mallard Park, in Decatur, Alabama
- Black Mallard River, Lower Peninsula of Michigan

== Fiction ==
- Mallard Fillmore, a conservative politically oriented comic strip
- Dr. Donald "Ducky" Mallard, a character on the television show NCIS
- Gosalyn Mallard, a character created for the Disney animated series Darkwing Duck
- Millard the Mallard, a fictional character and mascot of WRVA radio in Richmond, Virginia
- Molly Mallard, a Disney character who is Scrooge McDuck's paternal grandmother
- Darkwing Duck, a Disney character whose alter-ego is Drake Mallard
- Roy Mallard, the central character in the 1990s mockumentary TV series People Like Us

== Sports teams ==
- Fermanagh Mallards F.C., a women's association football team in Ballinamallard, Northern Ireland
- Madison Mallards, a collegiate summer baseball team from Madison, Wisconsin
- Quad City Mallards, an ice hockey team from Moline, Illinois

== Other uses ==
- Mallard (documentation), a markup language for creation of user documentation
- Mallard (surname)
- Mallard BASIC, a BASIC interpreter for CP/M produced by Locomotive Software
- Mallard and Claret, a popular fishing fly in the United Kingdom
- 6236 Mallard, a main-belt asteroid
- Operation Mallard, a part of World War II 1944 Operation Tonga in Normandy
