= Meillard (surname) =

Meillard is a surname. Notable people with the surname include:

- Loïc Meillard (born 1996), Swiss skier
- Mélanie Meillard (born 1998), Swiss skier

== See also ==
- Maillard (surname)
- Millard (surname)
