= Maillard =

Maillard may refer to:

- Maillard (surname)
- Maillard (automobile)
- Maillard, a French bicycle parts brand purchased by Fichtel & Sachs in the 1980s

== See also ==
- Maillard reaction
- Mallard (disambiguation)
