= Alard Stradivarius =

Alard Stradivarius is a sobriquet used for two violins fabricated by Antonio Stradivari:

- Alard-Baron Knoop Stradivarius of 1715
- Artot-Alard Stradivarius of 1728
