= Bellard =

Bellard is a surname. Notable people with the surname include:

- Chris Bellard (born 1979), American rapper known as Young Maylay
- Emory Bellard (1927–2011), college football coach
- Eugenio de Bellard Pietri (1927–2000), founder of speleology in Venezuela
- Fabrice Bellard, French computer programmer
- Mary Roszela Bellard (born 1971), American Creole Zydeco accordion player and singer

- Bellard's formula, used to calculate the nth digit of π in base 2

== See also ==
- Ballard (disambiguation)
- Bellardia (disambiguation)
- Bullard
