= Adelardo =

Adelardo is a given name. Notable people with the name include:

- Adelardo Cattaneo (died 1214), Italian cardinal
- Adelardo López de Ayala y Herrera (1828–1879), Spanish writer and politician
- Adelardo Covarsí (1885–1951), Spanish painter
- Adelardo Rodríguez (born 1939), former Spanish footballer
