= Allard =

Allard may refer to:

- Allard (surname), people with the surname Allard
- Allard Motor Company
- Allard River, river in Quebec
- Allard, Edmonton
- Peter A. Allard School of Law, the law school of the University of British Columbia

== Given name ==
- Allard Anthony (1620–1685), Dutch alderman
- Allard Baird (born 1961), baseball executive
- Allard H. Gasque (1873–1938), U.S. Representative from South Carolina
- Allard K. Lowenstein (1929–1980), politician
- Allard Oosterhuis (1902–1967), Dutch resistance hero
- Allard Pierson (1831–1896), Dutch theologian
- Allard de Ridder (1887–1966), Dutch–Canadian conductor, violist, and composer
- Allard Roen (1921–2008), American businessman
- Allard van der Scheer (actor), Dutch actor
