= Callard =

Callard is a surname. Notable people with the surname include:

- Agnes Callard (born 1976), American philosopher
- Andrea Callard (born 1950), media artist long connected with the artists group Colab in New York City
- Beverley Callard (born 1957), English actress, known for her roles as June Dewhurst and Liz McDonald in ITV's Coronation Street
- Charles G. Callard (1923–2004), known in the financial community for innovative application of mathematics and statistics to stock analysis
- Jon Callard (born 1966), coach at the Rugby Football Union's National Academy
- Kay Callard (1923–2008), Canadian film and television actress who spent most of her career in Britain
- Rebecca Callard (born 1975), English actress from Leeds
- Tanya Callard, character in the British TV series Emmerdale in 2009

== See also ==
- Callard & Bowser, New York subsidiary of Wm. Wrigley Jr. Company, responsible for Altoids mints and other products
- Alard (disambiguation)
- Allard
- Calla
