= Electoral results for the district of Bligh =

Election results for Bligh, New South Wales, Australia

Bligh, an electoral district of the Legislative Assembly in the Australian state of New South Wales was created in 1962 and abolished in 2007.

Election	Member	Party
1962	Tom Morey	Labor
1965	Morton Cohen	Liberal
1968	John Barraclough	Liberal
1971	John Barraclough	Liberal
1973	John Barraclough	Liberal
1976	John Barraclough	Liberal
1978	John Barraclough	Liberal
1981	Fred Miller	Labor
1984	Michael Yabsley	Liberal
1988	Clover Moore	Independent
1991	Clover Moore	Independent
1995	Clover Moore	Independent
1999	Clover Moore	Independent
2003	Clover Moore	Independent

== Election results ==
=== Elections in the 2000s ===
==== 2003 ====
2003 New South Wales state election: Bligh
Party	Candidate	Votes	%	±%
Independent	Clover Moore	15,330	38.5	+1.2
Labor	Barri Phatarfod	9,071	22.8	−9.1
Liberal	Shayne Mallard	8,496	21.3	−0.1
Greens	Anita Ceravolo	5,634	14.1	+8.2
Unity	Stephen Pong	642	1.6	+0.0
Christian Democrats	Jon Phillips	279	0.7	+0.7
Independent	Malcolm Duncan	268	0.7	+0.0
Independent	Gary Burns	113	0.3	+0.3
Total formal votes		39,833	97.8	+0.1
Informal votes		882	2.2	−0.1
Turnout		40,715	84.3	
Notional two-party-preferred count
Labor	Barri Phatarfod	15,499	60.9	−0.9
Liberal	Shayne Mallard	9,971	39.1	+0.9
Two-candidate-preferred result
Independent	Clover Moore	19,253	64.7	+4.9
Labor	Barri Phatarfod	10,525	35.3	−4.9
Independent hold		Swing	+4.9	

=== Elections in the 1990s ===
==== 1999 ====
1999 New South Wales state election: Bligh
Party	Candidate	Votes	%	±%
Independent	Clover Moore	14,214	37.3	+5.7
Labor	Vic Smith	12,153	31.9	+4.8
Liberal	Peter Fussell	8,140	21.4	−10.8
Greens	Emelia Holdaway	2,245	5.9	−1.0
Unity	Ariel Marguin	621	1.6	+1.6
Independent	Malcolm Duncan	280	0.7	+0.7
Euthanasia Referendum	Julia Trubridge	190	0.5	+0.5
Timbarra Clean Water	Change Upton	128	0.3	+0.3
Natural Law	Bronia Hatfield	93	0.2	−0.1
Total formal votes		38,064	97.7	+2.2
Informal votes		883	2.3	−2.2
Turnout		38,947	86.0	
Notional two-party-preferred count
Labor	Vic Smith	16,528	61.7	+6.3
Liberal	Peter Fussell	10,254	38.3	−6.3
Two-candidate-preferred result
Independent	Clover Moore	19,636	59.8	−4.0
Labor	Vic Smith	13,215	40.2	+4.0
Independent hold		Swing	−4.0	

==== 1995 ====
1995 New South Wales state election: Bligh
Party	Candidate	Votes	%	±%
Liberal	James Fisher	13,636	40.1	−0.1
Independent	Clover Moore	12,356	36.3	−7.4
Labor	Susan Harben	6,191	18.2	+2.1
Greens	Virginia Milson	1,697	5.0	+5.0
Natural Law	Machael Lippmann	142	0.4	+0.4
Total formal votes		34,022	96.3	+4.8
Informal votes		1,300	3.7	−4.8
Turnout		35,322	87.8	
Two-candidate-preferred result
Independent	Clover Moore	17,886	55.5	−0.6
Liberal	James Fisher	14,359	44.5	+0.6
Independent hold		Swing	−0.6	

==== 1991 ====
1991 New South Wales state election: Bligh
Party	Candidate	Votes	%	±%
Independent	Clover Moore	12,801	43.7	+21.6
Liberal	Carol Dance	11,764	40.2	−9.7
Labor	Anne-Maree Whitaker	4,729	16.1	−9.6
Total formal votes		29,294	91.5	−4.9
Informal votes		2,710	8.5	+4.9
Turnout		32,004	87.3	
Two-candidate-preferred result
Independent	Clover Moore	15,762	56.1	+11.4
Liberal	Carol Dance	12,352	43.9	−11.4
Independent notional gain from Liberal		Swing	+11.4	

Bligh became a notional Liberal seat as a result of the 1990 redistribution, however Clover Moore (Independent) retained the seat with an increased margin.

=== Elections in the 1980s ===
==== 1988 ====
1988 New South Wales state election: Bligh
Party	Candidate	Votes	%	±%
Liberal	Michael Yabsley	11,748	44.0	−2.9
Independent	Clover Moore	7,135	26.7	+26.7
Labor	Ross Aubrey	7,112	26.6	−19.1
Democrats	Joseph Zingarelli	415	1.6	−4.8
Call to Australia	Bruce Thompson	293	1.1	+1.1
Total formal votes		26,703	96.6	+0.3
Informal votes		944	3.4	−0.3
Turnout		27,647	85.8	
Two-candidate-preferred result
Independent	Clover Moore	12,748	50.6	+50.6
Liberal	Michael Yabsley	12,431	49.4	−0.8
Independent gain from Liberal		Swing	+50.6	

==== 1984 ====
1984 New South Wales state election: Bligh
Party	Candidate	Votes	%	±%
Liberal	Michael Yabsley	13,134	48.5	+4.2
Labor	Fred Miller	12,279	45.3	−2.3
Democrats	Brian Hillman	1,689	6.2	+2.0
Total formal votes		27,102	96.4	+0.2
Informal votes		1,005	3.6	−0.2
Turnout		28,107	85.8	+3.0
Two-party-preferred result
Liberal	Michael Yabsley	13,740	51.2	+3.9
Labor	Fred Miller	13,085	48.8	−3.9
Liberal gain from Labor		Swing	+3.9	

==== 1981 ====
1981 New South Wales state election: Bligh
Party	Candidate	Votes	%	±%
Labor	Fred Miller	11,807	47.6	
Liberal	John Barraclough	10,997	44.3	
Democrats	Joseph Zingarelli	1,050	4.2	
Independent	George Warnecke	966	3.9	
Total formal votes		24,820	96.2	
Informal votes		977	3.8	
Turnout		25,797	82.8	
Two-party-preferred result
Labor	Fred Miller	12,876	52.7	−3.9
Liberal	John Barraclough	11,561	47.3	+3.9
Labor notional hold		Swing	−3.9	

The sitting member was John Barraclough (Liberal), however Bligh had become notionally held by Labor due to the redistribution.

=== Elections in the 1970s ===
==== 1978 ====
1978 New South Wales state election: Bligh
Party	Candidate	Votes	%	±%
Liberal	John Barraclough	15,220	56.1	−1.3
Labor	Suzanne Ashmore-Smith	10,818	39.9	+7.7
Democrats	Susanna Dodgson	1,097	4.0	+4.0
Total formal votes		27,135	96.9	−0.8
Informal votes		879	3.1	+0.8
Turnout		28,014	84.9	−2.7
Two-party-preferred result
Liberal	John Barraclough	15,457	58.4	−5.4
Labor	Suzanne Ashmore-Smith	11,012	41.6	+5.4
Liberal hold		Swing	−5.4	

==== 1976 ====
1976 New South Wales state election: Bligh
Party	Candidate	Votes	%	±%
Liberal	John Barraclough	16,868	57.4	−8.9
Labor	Mairi Petersen	9,462	32.2	+32.2
Independent	Graeme Donkin	1,121	3.8	+3.8
Workers	John Curvers	1,085	3.7	+3.7
Independent	Alexander Nash	872	3.0	+3.0
Total formal votes		29,408	97.7	+2.6
Informal votes		706	2.3	−2.6
Turnout		30,114	87.6	+3.6
Two-party-preferred result
Liberal	John Barraclough	18,750	63.8	−6.2
Labor	Mairi Petersen	10,658	36.2	+36.2
Liberal hold		Swing	−6.2	

==== 1973 ====
1973 New South Wales state election: Bligh
Party	Candidate	Votes	%	±%
Liberal	John Barraclough	16,767	66.3	+7.5
Australia	Julia Featherstone	6,656	26.3	+26.3
Democratic Labor	Monica Quigley	1,883	7.4	+4.5
Total formal votes		25,306	95.1	
Informal votes		1,298	4.9	
Turnout		26,604	84.0	
Two-candidate-preferred result
Liberal	John Barraclough	17,709	70.0	+5.9
Australia	Julia Featherstone	7,597	30.0	+30.0
Liberal hold		Swing	+5.9	

==== 1971 ====
1971 New South Wales state election: Bligh
Party	Candidate	Votes	%	±%
Liberal	John Barraclough	14,104	58.8	
Labor	Maurice Allen	6,522	27.2	
Independent	Francis Claffy	1,387	5.8	
Abortion Law Reform	Bridget Gilling	899	3.8	
Democratic Labor	Dominique Droulers	696	2.9	
Independent	Merilyn Giesekam	202	0.8	
Independent	Thomas Smith	170	0.7	
Total formal votes		23,980	96.2	
Informal votes		953	3.8	
Turnout		24,933	86.6	
Two-party-preferred result
Liberal	John Barraclough	16,058	67.0	−1.9
Labor	Maurice Allen	7,922	33.0	+1.9
Liberal hold		Swing	−1.9	

=== Elections in the 1960s ===
==== 1968 ====
1968 New South Wales state election: Bligh
Party	Candidate	Votes	%	±%
Liberal	John Barraclough	11,954	57.2	+3.7
Labor	Tom Morey	7,496	35.9	−8.0
Democratic Labor	Henry Bader	818	3.9	+1.3
Independent	Peter Clyne	630	3.0	+3.0
Total formal votes		20,898	96.4	
Informal votes		773	3.6	
Turnout		21,671	89.5	
Two-party-preferred result
Liberal	John Barraclough	12,923	61.8	+6.3
Labor	Thomas Morey	7,975	38.2	−6.3
Liberal hold		Swing	+6.3	

==== 1965 ====
1965 New South Wales state election: Bligh
Party	Candidate	Votes	%	±%
Liberal	Morton Cohen	10,391	49.5	+4.2
Labor	Tom Morey	10,069	47.9	−2.3
Democratic Labor	John Kenny	548	2.6	−1.9
Total formal votes		21,008	97.5	−0.7
Informal votes		527	2.5	+0.7
Turnout		21,535	91.7	−0.5
Two-party-preferred result
Liberal	Morton Cohen	10,797	51.4	+2.5
Labor	Tom Morey	10,211	48.6	−2.5
Liberal gain from Labor		Swing	+2.5	

==== 1962 ====
1962 New South Wales state election: Bligh
Party	Candidate	Votes	%	±%
Labor	Tom Morey	11,186	50.2	
Liberal	Vernon Treatt	10,098	45.3	
Democratic Labor	James Markham	1,012	4.5	
Total formal votes		22,296	98.2	
Informal votes		411	1.8	
Turnout		22,707	92.2	
Two-party-preferred result
Labor	Tom Morey	11,388	51.1	
Liberal	Vernon Treatt	10,908	48.9	
Labor notional gain from Liberal		Swing		

- Bligh was a new seat created from the abolished districts of Paddington−Waverley, held by Keith Anderson (Labor) and Woollahra held by Vernon Treatt (Liberal). It was a notionally a marginal Liberal seat.
