= 2012 Sydney state by-election =

Election result for Sydney, New South Wales, Australia

- 27 October 2012
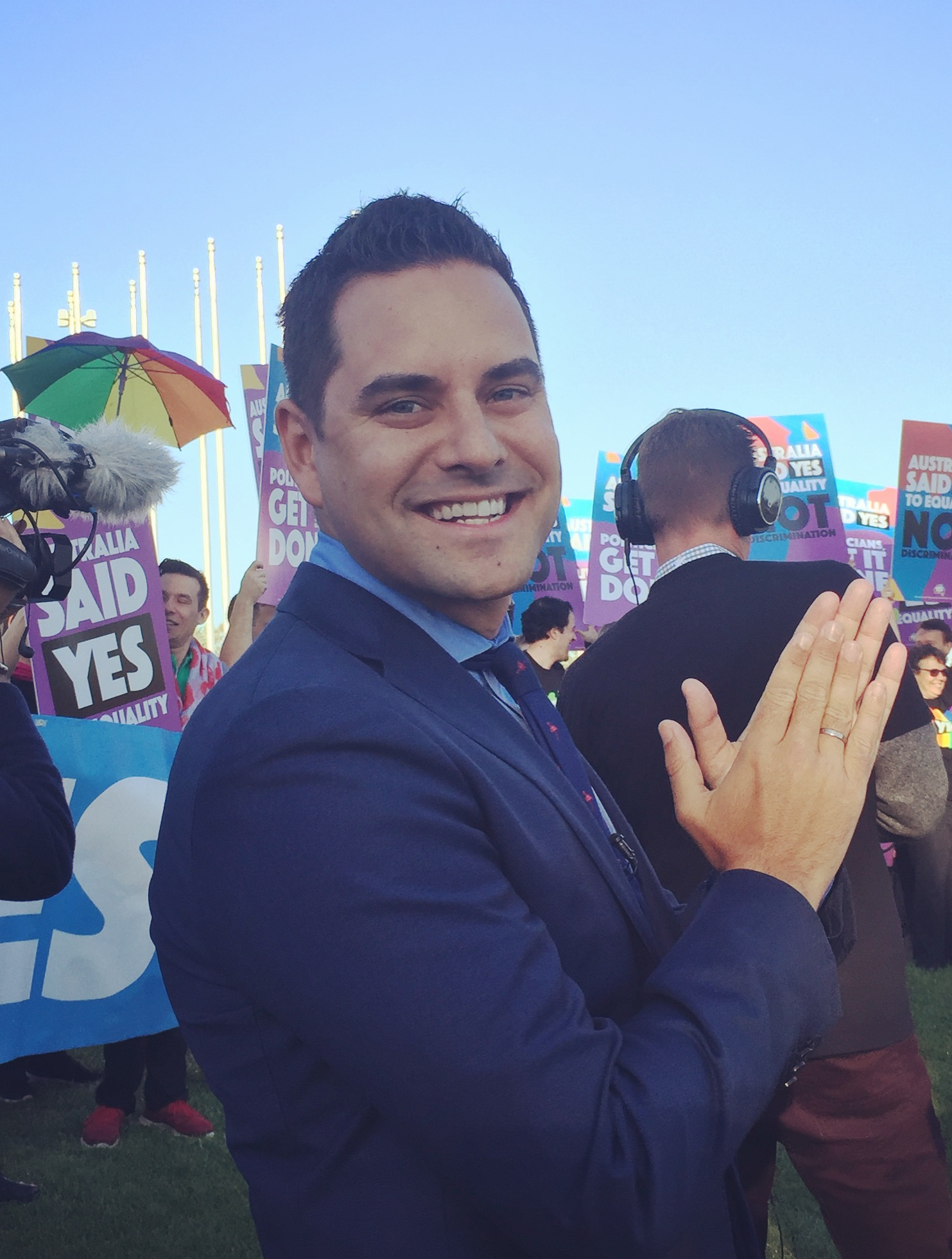

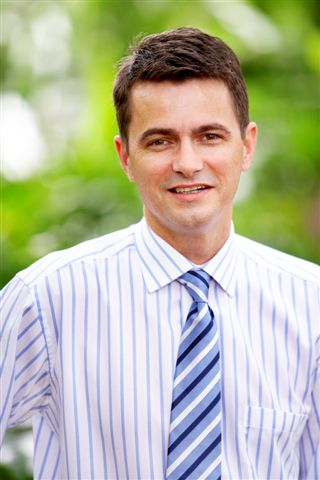

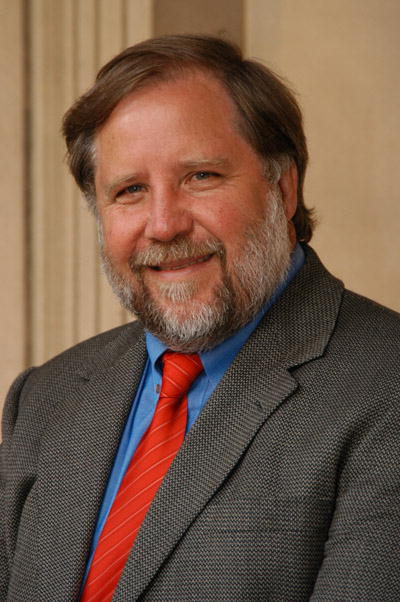
	First party	Second party	Third party
Candidate	Alex Greenwich	Shayne Mallard	Chris Harris
Party	Independent	Liberal	Greens
Popular vote	17,687	11,543	6,616
Percentage	47.3%	30.9%	17.7%
Swing	▲47.3	▼5.3	▲4.9
TPP	63.7%	36.3%
TPP swing	▲63.7	▼10.6
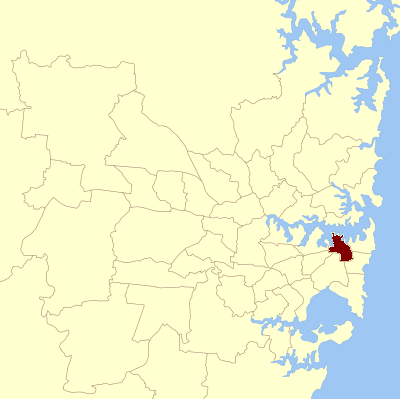
- Electoral district of Sydney in central metropolitan Sydney
MP before election
Clover Moore
Independent
Elected MP
Alex Greenwich
Independent

A by-election for the New South Wales Legislative Assembly seat of Sydney was held on Saturday 27 October 2012. The by-election was triggered by the resignation of independent MP Clover Moore due to the legislation preventing dual membership of state parliament and local council.

Following the 2012 local government elections in which Moore was re-elected for a third term as Lord Mayor of Sydney, Moore resigned from NSW Parliament. Laws passed through NSW Parliament in 2012 ceased dual state parliament and local council representation.

Alex Greenwich, an independent candidate backed by Moore easily won the seat.

== Dates ==
Date	Event
8 October 2012	Writ of election issued by the Speaker of the Legislative Assembly and close of electoral rolls.
10 October 2012	Close of party nominations
11 October 2012	Close of independent nominations, ballot paper order draw conducted
15 October 2012	Early voting began
27 October 2012	Polling day, between the hours of 8 am and 6 pm

== Background ==
Moore was first elected to the marginal seat of Bligh at the 1988 election. Her largest primary vote was 43.7 percent in 1991, while her largest two-candidate preferred vote was 64.7 percent in 2003. The seat was replaced by Sydney at the 2007 election, where Moore retained the seat with a primary vote of 39.6 percent (+7.2) and a two-candidate preferred vote of 66.6 percent (+1.6) against Labor. At the 2011 election, Moore retained the seat with a primary vote of 36.3 percent and a two-candidate vote of 53.1 percent against the Liberals with a primary vote of 36.2 percent (+14.6), the Greens on 12.8 percent (−2.8), and Labor on 11.3 percent (−8.7). In two-party preferred terms, the seat had a Liberal vote of 65.5 percent (+22.4) against Labor.

There was a 16.3 percent two-party preferred swing away from the Coalition government at the 2011 Clarence by-election. The Coalition did not contest the 2012 Heffron by-election which Labor retained with an increased margin. Labor strategically chose not to contest the Sydney by-election.

== Candidates ==
The five candidates in ballot paper order were as follows:

Candidates
Christian Democratic Party	Robyn Peebles	Pastor of West Ryde Church of the Good Shepherd, state and federal serial candidate.
Independent	Alex Greenwich	LGBT rights campaigner, leader of Australian Marriage Equality. Endorsed by Clover Moore.
Greens	Chris Harris	Councillor for City of Sydney 2004–2012. Contested Sydney in 2007.
Liberal Party	Shayne Mallard	Councillor for City of South Sydney 2000–2004 and City of Sydney 2004–2012. LGBT rights campaigner. Contested Bligh in 2003.
Independent	Glenn Wall	Long-term local activist, most recently involved with the Occupy Sydney movement.

== Polling ==
- On 26 September 2012, 422 voters (5% MoE) in the seat were robocall polled by ReachTel. Greenwich was on a primary vote of 31.4 percent, the Liberals were on 30.6 percent, the Greens were on 25.4 percent, with 'others' on 12.5 percent (respondents were told Labor was not fielding a candidate). Although no two-candidate preferred vote was given, the ABC's election analyst Antony Green said Greenwich would have been favoured to win on preferences given that Labor decided not to run a candidate.

== Results ==
2012 Sydney by-election Saturday 27 October
Party	Candidate	Votes	%	±%
Independent	Alex Greenwich	17,687	47.3	+47.3
Liberal	Shayne Mallard	11,543	30.9	–5.3
Greens	Chris Harris	6,616	17.7	+4.9
Independent	Glenn Wall	825	2.2	+2.2
Christian Democrats	Robyn Peebles	724	1.9	+0.8
Total formal votes		37,395	97.2	–0.6
Informal votes		1,062	2.8	+0.6
Turnout		38,457	62.6	–21.3
Two-candidate-preferred result
Independent	Alex Greenwich	21,283	63.7	+63.7
Liberal	Shayne Mallard	12,120	36.3	–10.6
Independent hold		Swing	N/A	

== See also ==
- Electoral results for the district of Sydney
- Electoral results for the district of Bligh
- List of New South Wales state by-elections
