= Maillard (surname) =

Maillard is a surname. Notable people with the surname include:

- Armand Maillard (b.1943), French Catholic church archbishop
- Carol Lynn Maillard (b.1951), African-American actress, singer, and composer
- Chantal Maillard (b.1951), Spanish poet and philosopher
- Charles-Thomas Maillard De Tournon (1668–1710), papal legate and cardinal
- Edmond Maillard (1896–1969), Chilean cyclist
- Jean Maillard (c.1515–after 1570), French composer
- Jean-Cristophe Maillard, founder of American band Grand Baton
- Jean de Maillard (b.1951), French magistrate
- Keith Maillard (b.1942), Canadian-American novelist, poet, and professor
- Kenneth Maillard (b.1972), Mauritian accountant
- Louis Maillard (astronomer) (1867–1938), French-born Swiss astronomer and professor
- Louis Camille Maillard (1878–1936), French physician and chemist
- Oliver Maillard (c.1430–1502), Breton Franciscan preacher
- Pierre Maillard (c.1710–1762), French-born Roman Catholic priest
- Pierre-Yves Maillard (b.1968), Swiss politician
- Stanislas-Marie Maillard (1763–1794), captain of the Bastille Volunteers
- Sébastien Maillard (b.1981), French hurdler
- Sylvain Maillard (b.1974), French politician
- William Job Maillard (1863–1903), English recipient of the Victoria Cross

== See also ==
- Maillard (disambiguation)
