= Adelard =

Adelard (also spelled Adelhard, Adalhard or Adalard) may refer to:

== People in the Middle Ages ==
- Adelard, father of the Frankish saint Herlindis of Maaseik (died 745)
- Adalard of Corbie (751–827), Frankish abbot
- Adelard of Spoleto (died 824), Italian nobleman
- Adalard the Seneschal, 9th-century Frankish nobleman
- Adalhard of Metz (c. 840–890), Frankish nobleman
- Adalard of Paris (c. 830–890), Frankish nobleman
- Adalhard of Babenberg (died 903), Frankish nobleman
- Adalard (bishop of Le Puy) (fl. 919–924), first count–bishop of Le Puy
- Adelard of Ghent, 11th-century biographer of Saint Dunstan
- Adelard of Bath (c. 1080?–c. 1142–1152?), English scholar

== Canadians since the 19th century ==
- Adélard Godbout (1892–1956), Canadian politician
- Adélard Turgeon (1863–1930), Canadian lawyer and politician
- Adélard Langevin (1855–1915), Canadian archbishop and priest
- Adélard Bellemare (1871–1933), Canadian politician
- Adélard Lafrance (1912–1995), Canadian ice hockey player
- Adélard Laurendeau (1883–1968), Canadian politician

== See also ==
- Adelardo (disambiguation)
