= Steve Adlard =

English cricketer and footballer

Personal information
- Date of birth: 23 October 1950
- Date of death: 18 September 2018 (aged 67)

Senior career*
Years	Team	Apps	(Gls)
	Nottingham Forest	0	(0)
	Lincoln City	0	(0)

Managerial career
- 1982–1986: University of Evansville (assistant)
- 1986–1988: Davis & Elkins
- 1988–1991: UNC Asheville
- 1991–2005: Marquette University
- * Club domestic league appearances and goals

Stephen Keith Adlard (23 October 1950 – 18 September 2018) was an English footballer and first-class cricketer.

== Life ==
Adlard played professional football for several seasons in England, as a goalkeeper. He was a member of the Nottingham Forest (first division) and Lincoln City (fourth division) teams, but never played at first-team level. As a cricketer, he played one match for Lincolnshire against Derbyshire in the 1976 Gillette Cup and played in the Minor Counties Championship from 1975 to 1980.

From 1982 to 1986 Adlard was an assistant coach for the University of Evansville soccer team. From 1986 to 1988 he was the head coach of Davis and Elkins and then moved on to become director of soccer at UNC-Asheville from 1988 to 1991. During the same time, 1988–1991, he was the head coach of the 1972 classic division of the USYSA, The Asheville Highlanders. From 1991 to November 2005 he was the head coach at Marquette University.
