= Mallard and Claret =

- Artificial fly
- Type: Wet fly
- Imitates: minnow, attractor, or deceiver

History
- Creator: William Murdoch
- Created: 1850s

Materials
- Typical sizes: 8-14
- Typical hooks: original used a double hook
- Thread: Black
- Tail: 7-8 fibres of golden pheasant tippet
- Body: dubbed claret seal's fur
- Wing: Rolled wing from a Mallard Bronze shoulder feather
- Ribbing: silver or gold wire
- Hackle: black hen hackle
- Head: Tying thread

Uses
- Primary use: brown trout
- Other uses: sea trout

Mallard and Claret is a popular fishing fly in the United Kingdom. Also known as the 'M and C' it is a good general pattern that imitates a wide range of trout food items. The Mallard and Claret fly was created in the 1850s by Aberdeen fly tyer William Murdock. As its name suggests, this fly is constructed from the feathers of a mallard duck together with a claret coloured body.
