= Ollard =

Ollard is a surname. Notable people with the surname include:

- Edward Ollard, British civil servant, Clerk of the Parliaments
- Richard Ollard (1923–2007), English historian and biographer
- Sidney Leslie Ollard (1875–1949), British Anglican priest, Canon of Windsor
