= Chantal Maillard =

Spanish poet & philosopher (born 1951)

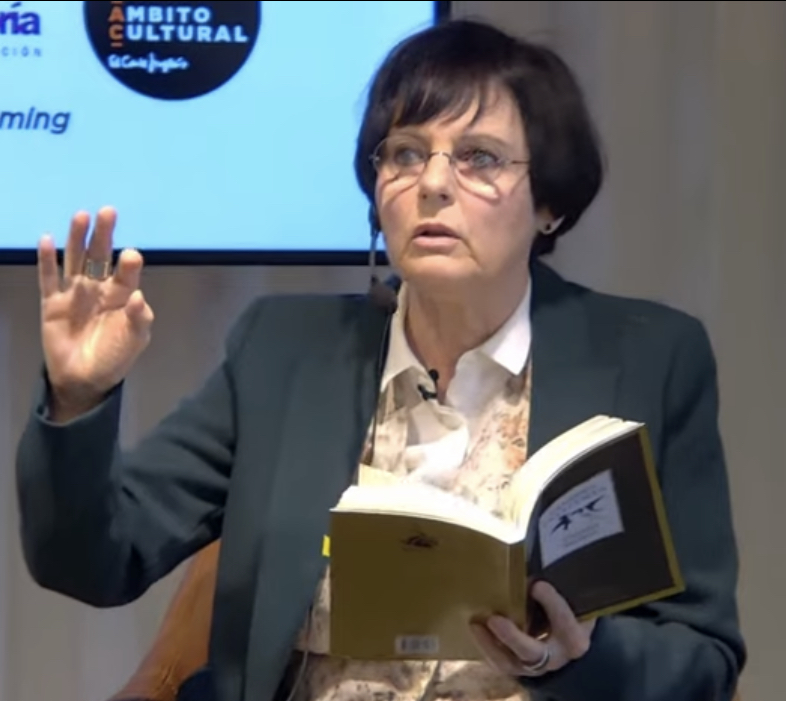
- Born: 1951 (age 74–75); Brussels, Belgium
- Occupation: writer

Chantal Maillard (born 1951) is a contemporary Belgo-Spanish poet and philosopher.

With a long repertoire behind her, she has received various literary prizes for her poetry. She was awarded the Premio Nacional de Poesía in Spain in 2004 for her work Matar a Platón and the Premio de la Crítica for Spanish Poetry in 2007, as well as the Premio Andalucía de la Crítica for her work Hilos. Her prose is particularly characterized for merging and transgressing literary genres. Her essays mainly concern philosophy and sometimes focus on María Zambrano.

After receiving her doctorate in Philosophy from the University of Málaga, she spent long periods traveling and living in India, specializing in Philosophy and Religions from India at the Banaras Hindu University. Until 2000, she was a professor of Aesthetics and Art Theory at the University of Málaga, where was instrumental in the creation of the Department of Comparative Philosophy and Aesthetics.

Since 1998, she has written articles on philosophy, aesthetics and Eastern Thought for several publications such as ABC and El País. She has translated and edited the work of Henri Michaux, and is also known for her efforts to promote philosophy from India in many of her works.

Chantal Maillard has also worked on stage and adapted her works to various interdisciplinary projects, in collaboration with visual and stage artists, musicians and filmmakers from Spain and around the world.

== Works ==
=== Poetry ===
- Semillas para un cuerpo (in collaboration with Jesús Aguado). Soria: Diputación Provincial de Soria, 1988. Premio Leonor 1987
- La otra orilla. Coria del Río: Qüásyeditorial, 1990. Premio Juan Sierra 1990
- Hainuwele. Córdoba: Ayuntamiento de Córdoba, 1990. Premio Ciudad de Córdoba «Ricardo Molina» 1990
- Poemas a mi muerte. Madrid: La Palma, 1993. Premio Ciudad de Santa Cruz de la Palma 1993
- Conjuros. Madrid: Huerga y Fierro. Editores, S.L., 2001.
- Lógica borrosa. Málaga: Miguel Gómez Ediciones, 2002.
- Matar a Platón. Barcelona: Tusquets, 2004. Premio Nacional de Poesía 2004
- Hilos, 2007. Premio Nacional de la Crítica 2007 and Premio Andalucía de la Crítica 2008.
- La tierra prometida. Barcelona: Milrazones, 2009.
- Hainuwele y otros poemas. Barcelona: Tusquets, 2009.
- Cual. DVD. Contains a reading of "Hilos" and a short film interpreted by the author. Málaga: Centro de la Generación del 27, 2009.
- Polvo de avispas. Málaga: Árbol de Poe, (booklet) 2011.
- Balbuceos. Málaga: Árbol de Poe, (booklet) 2012.
- La herida en la lengua. Barcelona, 2015

=== Prose ===
- Filosofía en los días críticos. Valencia: Editorial Pre-Textos, 2001.
- Diarios indios. Valencia: Editorial Pre-Textos, 2005.
- Husos. Notas al margen. Valencia: Editorial Pre-Textos, 2006.
- Adiós a la India. Málaga: Puerta del Mar, 2009.
- Bélgica. Valencia: Editorial Pre-Textos, 2011.
- India. Valencia: Editorial Pre-Textos, 2014.
- La baba del caracol. Spain-Mexico: Editorial Vaso Roto, 2014.

=== Essays ===
- La kábala del kéter-malkut. Editoriales Andaluzas Unidas, 1986
- El monte Lu en lluvia y niebla. María Zambrano y lo divino. Málaga: Diputación Provincial de Málaga, 1990.
- La creación por la metáfora. Introducción a la razón poética. Barcelona: Anthropos, 1992.
- El crimen perfecto. Aproximación a la estética india. Madrid: Tecnos, 1993.
- La sabiduría como estética. China: confucianismo, budismo y taoísmo. Madrid: Akal, 1995.
- La razón estética. Barcelona: Laertes, 1998.
- Rasa. El placer estético en la tradición india. Benarés: Indica Books, 1999 and Palma de Mallorca: Olañeta, 2007.
- En la traza. Pequeña zoología poemática. Barcelona: Centro de Cultura Contemporánea 2008.
- Contra el arte y otras imposturas. Valencia: Editorial Pre-Textos, 2009.

=== Editions ===
- Estética y Hermenéutica. Chantal Maillard and Luis de Santiago Guervós (eds.). Málaga: Contrastes. Revista Interdisciplinar de Filosofía, 1999.
- Henri Michaux: Escritos sobre pintura. Murcia: Colegio de Arquitectos y Aparejadores, 2000.
- El árbol de la vida. La naturaleza en el arte y las tradiciones de la India. Barcelona: Kairós, 2001.
- Henri Michaux: Retrato de los meidosems. Valencia: Editorial Pre-Textos, 2008.

=== Available translated works ===
- Killing Plato. English translation of Matar a Platón by Yvette Siegert. New York: New Directions, 2019. Shortlist, PEN Award for Poetry in Translation.
- Draden gevold door Wat. Dutch translation of Hilos seguido de Cual by Bart Vonck. Leuven (Belgium): Editorial P, 2014.
- Amazzare Platone. Italian translation of Matar a Platón by Gabriele Blundo. Rome: Edizioni Elliot, 2013.
- In the Tracing. Small Poetic Zoology. Centro de Cultura Contemporánea de Barcelona, 2008. (Lecture given at the Center of Contemporary Culture of Barcelona on 11 February 2008, as part of the Barcelona Debate Series, "The Human Condition").
- Platon töten. German translation of Matar a Platón by Elisabeth Seifer. Zürich: Teamart Publishers, 2006.
- Plato doden: Dutch translation of Matar a Platón by Bart Vonck. Leuven: Editorial P, 2006.

Available in Braille through the ONCE:

- Matar a Platón.
- Hilos.
- Hainuwele y otros poemas.

== Theatre ==
- Matar a Platón en Concierto. With Chefa Alonso and Barbara Meyer. Madrid: Teatro Español, 2011 y Palma de Mallorca: Museo Es Baluart, 2013.
- Diarios Indios. With David Varela. Madrid: Teatro Pradillo, 2014.

== Prizes ==
- Premio Leonor 1987
- Ciudad de Córdoba «Ricardo Molina» 1990
- Premio Juan Sierra 1990
- Ciudad de Santa Cruz de la Palma 1993
- Premio Nacional de Poesía 2004
- Premio Nacional de la Crítica 2007
- Premio Andalucía de la Crítica 2008
