= Alard (surname) =

Alard is a French surname. Notable people with the surname include:

- Éric Alard (born 1967), French bobsledder
- Jean-Delphin Alard (1815–1888), French violinist
- Benjamin Alard (born 1985), French harpsichordist and organist
- Nelly Alard (born 1962), French actress

== See also ==
- Allard (surname)
