= Adelardo Covarsí =

Spanish painter

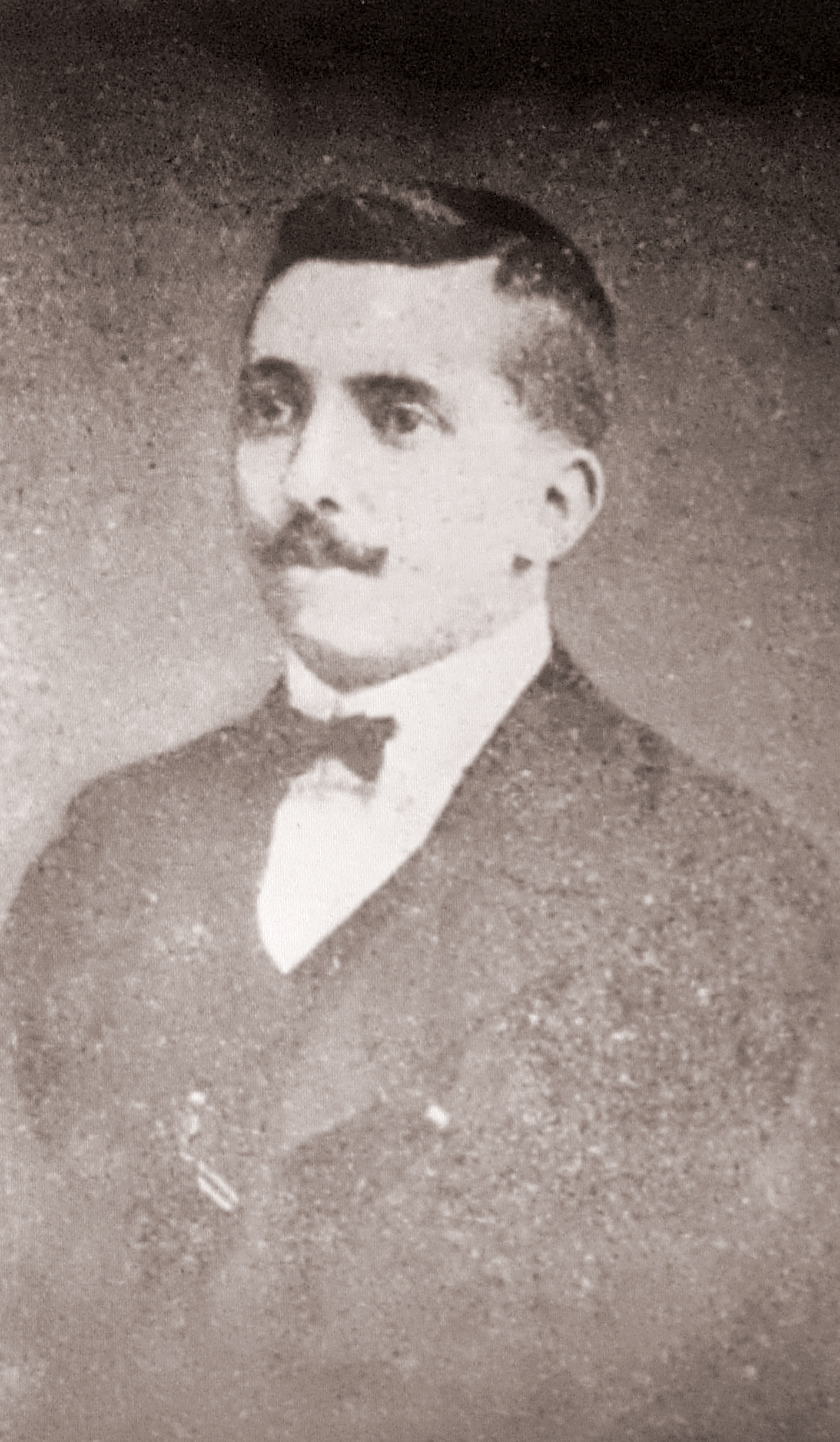
Adelardo Covarsí

Adelardo Covarsí (Badajoz, 23 March 1885 – Badajoz, 26 August 1951) was a Spanish painter active in Badajoz.

Covarsí began studying art in Badajoz, later moving to Madrid in 1902 to study painting, sculpture and engraving. He later taught at the School of Arts and Crafts in Badajoz.
