= Galland =

Galland is a surname. Notable people with the surname include:

- Adolf Galland (1912–1996), German air general during World War II
- Antoine Galland (1646–1715), French orientalist and archeologist; first European translator of The Arabian Nights
- Antoine Galland (1763–1851), publisher and printer during the French Revolution and First Empire
- Barbara Galland, New Zealand academic in the field of paediatric sleep health
- Bertha Galland (1876–1932), American stage actress
- Bruno Galland (born 1964), French medievalist
- Eddy Galland (1961–1995), triplet profiled in the 2018 documentary film Three Identical Strangers
- Jean Galland (1887–1967), French film actor
- Jérémie Galland (born 1983), French cyclist
- Jordan Galland (born 1980), American entertainer
- Paul Galland (1919–1942), German World War II fighter pilot
- Pierre-Victor Galland (1822–1892), French decorative painter
- Stéphane Galland (born 1969), Belgian drummer
- Wilhelm-Ferdinand Galland (1914–1943), German World War II fighter pilot
- Yves Galland (1941–2025), French politician and entrepreneur

== Fictional ==
- Adolfine Galland, fictional character in the anime/manga Strike Witches

== See also ==
- Groupe Galland, Canadian bus operator
