= Bellardia =

Bellardia may refer to:

- Bellardia (fly), a genus of flies in the subfamily Calliphorinae
- Bellardia, a monotypic genus of flowering plants in the family Orobanchaceae with the only species Bellardia trixago
- Bellardia, a genus of plants in the family Asteraceae; synonym of Microseris
- Bellardia, a genus of plants in the family Rubiaceae; synonym of Coccocypselum
- Bellardia, a genus of snails in the family Pachychilidae; synonym of Comarmondia
