= Alex Greenwich =

Australian politician (born 1980)

Alex Greenwich MP
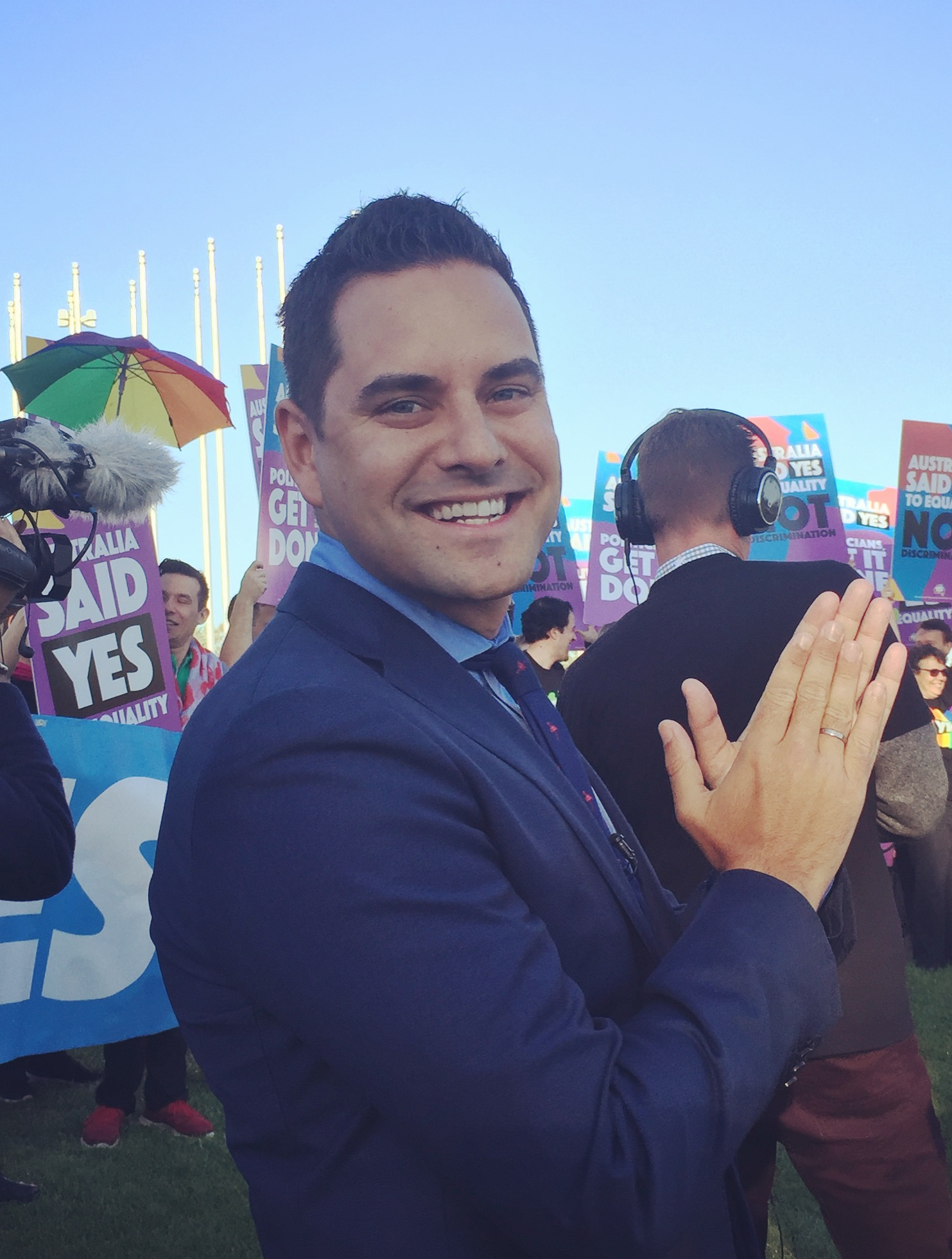
- Greenwich in 2017

Member of the New South Wales Parliament for Sydney
- Incumbent
- Assumed office 27 October 2012
- Preceded by: Clover Moore

Personal details
- Born: Alexander Hart Greenwich; 28 November 1980 (age 45) Wellington, New Zealand
- Party: Independent
- Other political affiliations: Clover Moore Independent Team
- Spouse: Victor Hoeld (m. 2012)
- Education: University of New South Wales
- Profession: Politician

Alexander Hart Greenwich (born 28 November 1980) is an Australian politician. He is a member of the New South Wales Legislative Assembly, representing the seat of Sydney since a 2012 by-election. He ran as an independent and was backed by his predecessor, independent Clover Moore.

He was also the co-chair of Australian Marriage Equality and one of the key leaders of the successful "Yes" campaign for the Australian Marriage Law Postal Survey in 2017 and abortion legalisation within New South Wales in 2019. He is a proponent of LGBTQ rights by helping to pass laws that respond to issues within the LGBTQ community. He helped legalise voluntary assisted dying in 2022.

== Early years and background ==
Greenwich was born in New Zealand to a Georgian father and American mother. His father, Victor Greenwich Dadianov (formerly the Honorary Consul-General of Georgia in Sydney, 2004–2013), was born Prince Victor Dadianov of the princely Georgian Dadiani family but his mother changed the name to Greenwich after they moved as refugees to New Zealand from Russia after the Second World War. At the age of seven, Greenwich moved with his family to Sydney. From his family residence in Circular Quay, Greenwich was educated at Sydney Grammar School and completed a Bachelor of Arts in Human Resource Management and Russian Studies at the University of New South Wales. From 1 December 1998 to 1 December 2012, Greenwich was the Managing Director of his own recruiting agency, Winning Attitudes Recruitment.

He is a direct descendant of the House of Dadiani, one of the oldest royal houses in Eastern Europe.

== Personal life ==
Greenwich is a gay male MP in the NSW Legislative Assembly. Before entering politics, Greenwich was a prominent LGBT rights activist and led Australian Marriage Equality (AME).

Prior to running for office, Greenwich was the national convener of AME from 2009, and in 2010 was named as one of Samesame.com.au's 25 most influential gay and lesbian Australians. As national convener, Greenwich organised over 44,000 submissions to be made to the 2011 Australian Senate inquiry into same-sex marriage, and continues to be a prominent activist for achieving same-sex marriage reform in Australia. In May 2012, Greenwich married his German Australian long-term partner, Victor Hoeld, in Argentina, where same-sex marriage was already legal.

As of 2017 Greenwich had triple Australian, New Zealand and United States citizenship. Shortly before this was publicised, Greenwich had renounced his New Zealand citizenship.

In 2023, Greenwich was one of those honoured as part of the 'Pride 2023' campaign. During this Sydney's Queen Victoria Building (QVB) underwent a transformation, including a temporary renaming, celebrating Sydney WorldPride. The QVB paid tribute to five members of the LGBTQIA+ community by capturing them as 'Real Queens' in a series of royal–style portraits. For WorldPride, Greenwich swapped his signature casual suit and shirt for a tuxedo with green tulle in a display that was hosted in the QVB.

=== Lawsuit against Mark Latham ===
In May 2023, Greenwich announced he would be launching defamation action against the then-leader of One Nation NSW, Mark Latham, for a graphic and homophobic tweet about Greenwich. Latham's tweet was widely criticised, with Prime Minister Anthony Albanese saying that "hateful speech" was never warranted, and One Nation founder and leader Pauline Hanson describing the tweet as "disgusting". Latham's tweet was a response to Greenwich, who criticised Latham over an event he was speaking at where pro-LGBT protesters demonstrating against his appearance were rushed by hundreds of men. Greenwich has also made a formal complaint to police against Latham, for using a carriage service to harass and offend, and has also lodged a complaint of homosexual vilification to the anti-discrimination board.

On 11 September 2024, the Federal Court ruled that the tweet was defamatory. Judge David O'Callaghan found that the tweet was defamatory because it made Greenwich out to be a person that "engages in disgusting sexual activities". He rejected Latham's defences, a statutory defence of honest opinion and a common law defence of qualified privilege, right of reply to attack. Greenwich also claimed that the tweet conveyed that Greenwich was not a fit and proper person to be a member of the New South Wales Parliament, however the judge found that allegation not proven. The court awarded Greenwich $140,000 in damages. Greenwich praised the judgement, saying "It gives me confidence that we've established some case law here that can protect other LGBTQ people", and that "The strength of this judgment is that... it is made clear that this Trump-style political attack on your opponents based on their sexuality, based on whatever you want to attack them for, has no place in the Australian public political discourse".

In an interview with DNA magazine published in their November 2025 issue, Greenwich stated that he had been diagnosed with post-traumatic stress disorder (PTSD), in the aftermath of Latham's comments and subsequent death threats directed towards him. Greenwich also said that he had been prescribed medical cannabis to deal with symptoms of PTSD, such as anxiety and insomnia.

In April 2026, the NSW Civil and Administrative Tribunal (NCAT) found Latham had subjected Greenwich to homosexual vilification and sexual harassment. NCAT required Latham to pay Greenwich $100,000, to delete any offensive social media posts and to refrain from harassing Greenwich further.

== Political career ==
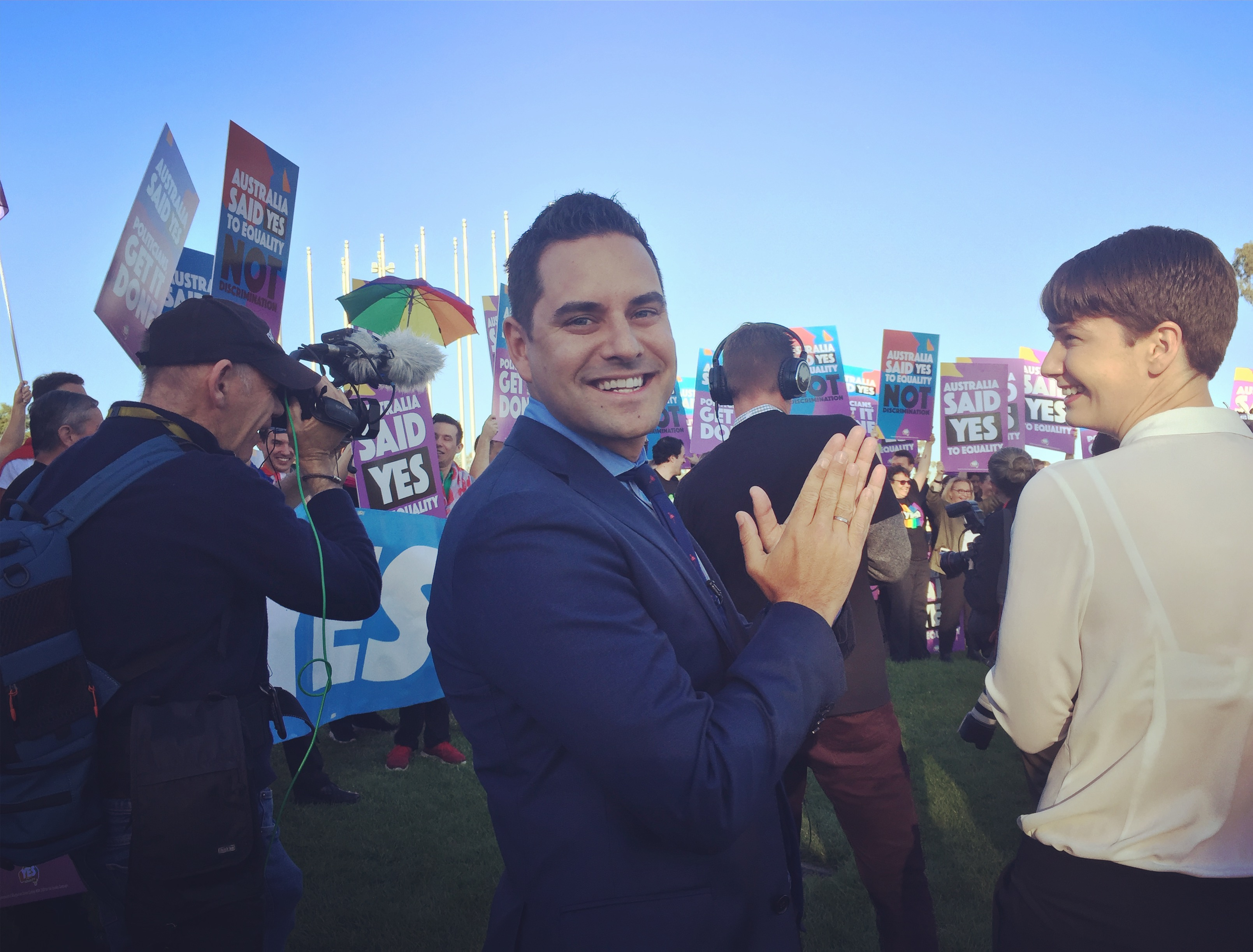
Alex Greenwich MP outside the Australian Federal Parliament on the day of the marriage equality vote

In July 2012, Greenwich aligned himself with prominent independent Lord Mayor of Sydney Clover Moore and announced his candidacy on Moore's ticket for the Sydney City Council elections scheduled for the NSW local government elections in September 2012. This low (and therefore most likely unelectable) position on the ticket fuelled speculation that this was to increase Greenwich's visibility for a possible run to succeed Moore should she be forced to resign her state seat of Sydney in light of promised reforms by the O'Farrell Liberal/National government to ban MPs from serving on local government bodies. This legislation was subsequently passed as the Local Government Amendment (Members of Parliament) Act 2012 (NSW) and following the local government elections in which Moore was re-elected for a third term as lord mayor, Moore resigned her seat in the New South Wales Legislative Assembly, triggering a by-election.

Greenwich subsequently contested the 2012 Sydney by-election as an independent with the endorsement of Moore, comfortably defeating Shayne Mallard of the Liberal Party with a 47.3 percent primary and 63.7 percent two-candidate preferred vote. Greenwich said after the by-election that it was "very clear Barry O'Farrell's legislation has backfired – because now there are two of us". Greenwich has denied claims that he is a single-issue politician, having gone to the by-election on a platform involving a range of policy areas, including small business, the re-establishment of an inner-city public high school, and social welfare and public housing, among others.

Greenwich introduced the Reproductive Health Care Reform Bill 2019 into the New South Wales Legislative Assembly on 1 August 2019, in a bid to decriminalise abortion in New South Wales, allow abortions for up to 22 weeks, and permit an abortion after 22 weeks if two medical practitioners agree. The bill passed the parliament on 26 September and was given royal assent on 2 October 2019 as the Abortion Law Reform Act 2019.

In October 2021, Greenwich introduced the Voluntary Assisted Dying Bill 2021. This bill later passed parliament and allows people to end their lives if they have a terminal illness. It passed both chambers of parliament and received royal assent in May 2022.

Greenwich also supported and introduced the Equality Legislation Amendment (LGBTIQA+) Bill 2023 which was passed by members of New South Wales's Parliament on 17 October 2024.

New South Wales Legislative Assembly
Preceded by Clover Moore	Member for Sydney; 2012–present	Incumbent
