= Allard van der Scheer =

Dutch actor (1928–2014)

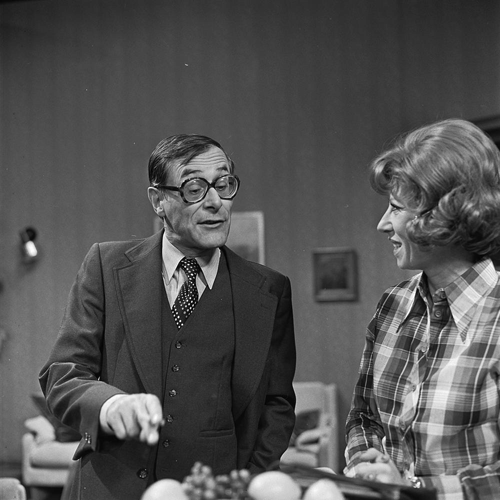
- Allard van der Scheer with Ronnie Bierman on the set of Hotel de Botel.
- Born: Allard Jan van der Scheer; 21 August 1928; The Hague, South Holland, Netherlands
- Died: 10 January 2014 (aged 85); Muiderberg, North Holland, Netherlands
- Occupation: Actor
- Years active: 1957–2010
- Children: 2 (including Veronique)

Allard Jan van der Scheer (21 August 1928 – 10 January 2014) was a Dutch actor.

Allard van der Scheer died on 10 January 2014, aged 85, in Muiderberg, North Holland. He was survived by his wife and their two daughters, including actress Veronique.
