= Artot–Alard Stradivarius =

The Artot–Alard Stradivarius of 1728 is an antique violin made by luthier Antonio Stradivari of Cremona (1644-1736).

This violin is currently on display in the Stradivarius exhibition at the Musical Instrument Museum in Phoenix, Arizona until June 5, 2016.

== See also ==
- Stradivarius
- List of Stradivarius instruments
