= Shayne Mallard =

Australian politician

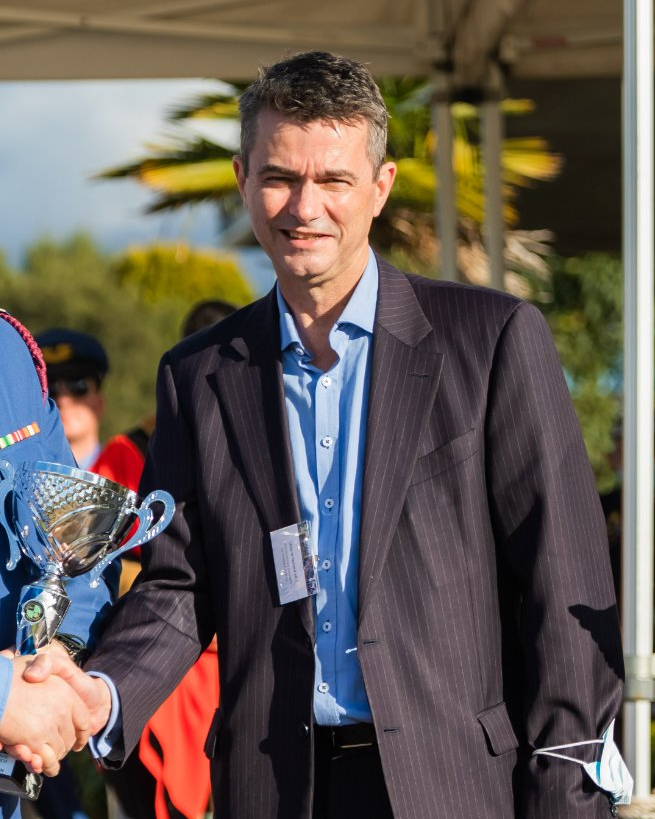

Member of the New South Wales Legislative Council
- In office 28 March 2015 – 3 March 2023

Councillor of the City of Sydney
- In office 27 March 2004 – 28 August 2012

Councillor of the City of South Sydney for North Ward
- In office 1 July 2000 – 27 March 2004

Personal details
- Born: Maxwell Shayne Mallard; 4 September 1964 (age 62) Sydney
- Party: Liberal Party
- Spouse: Jesper Hansen (m. 2013)
- Education: Macquarie University
- Website: www.shaynemallard.com.au

Maxwell Shayne Mallard (born 4 September 1964) is an Australian politician. He was a Liberal Party member of the New South Wales Legislative Council from 2015 until 2023. He was formerly a councillor of the City of South Sydney from 2000 to 2004, and of the City of Sydney from 2004 to 2012.

== Political background and council career ==
Mallard was President of the New South Wales branch of the Young Liberals from 1993 to 1994, succeeding John Brogden, who later became leader of the NSW Liberal Party and NSW Leader of the Opposition.

Prior to election to the City of Sydney council in March 2004, Mallard served as a councillor on the South Sydney City Council, from July 2000. In 2004, both councils were amalgamated. Mallard is the first Liberal endorsed candidate elected to the City of Sydney. In 2008, Mallard ran against sitting candidate Clover Moore for the popularly elected position of Lord Mayor, gaining 14% of the vote. Moore was re-elected.

Mallard was instrumental in setting up the city's register of same-sex relationships.

In 2009, Mallard faced two accusations of misconduct and for breaching Council's code of conduct. The first alleged indiscretion related to debating and voting on a development application before Council from the hotelier George Thomas who had allegedly made a donation to support Mallard's re-election to Council. Using parliamentary privilege, Lee Rhiannon, a Greens Member of NSW Legislative Council, accused Mallard of a second indiscretion by receiving illegal donations through provision of rent by a third party during the 2008 local government election campaign. Mallard asked the matters be referred to the NSW Department of Local Government for investigation. The Department of Local Government investigation cleared Mallard of allegations that he breached the council's code of conduct.

Following an earlier announcement that he would again run against Moore for the popularly elected position of Lord Mayor, in June 2012 Mallard announced that he would not contest the 2012 local government elections. In September 2012, Mallard was endorsed as the Liberal Party candidate for the NSW Legislative Assembly seat of Sydney at the 2012 by-election but was beaten by Moore-backed independent candidate Alex Greenwich.

In June 2021 Mallard was elected as Government Whip in the NSW Legislative Council and Parliamentary Secretary for Infrastructure and the Aerotropolis.

In December 2021, Mallard was appointed Parliamentary Secretary for Western Sydney.

== New South Wales parliamentary career ==
Mallard was elected to the New South Wales Legislative Council on the Liberal/Nationals ticket at the 2015 state election, endorsed as the seventh candidate.

Mallard was involved in calling on the government to protect the Radiata Plateau in the Blue Mountains.

== Post-parliamentary career ==
In 2023 Mallard lost his seat in the Legislative Council.

Mallard was later appointed through a competitive process to the new role of Director City Futures at Liverpool City Council. Mallard was previously employed at Liverpool City Council as a senior advisor to the Mayor Ned Mannoun and former CEO John Ajaka. Mallard leads Liverpool's future development plan, Liverpool2050.

== Personal ==
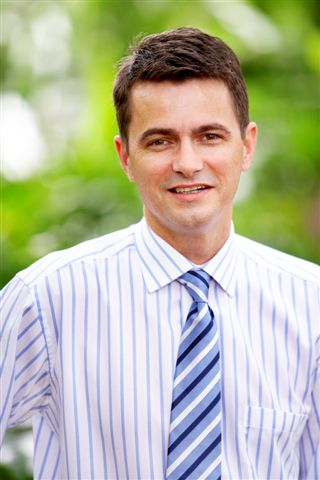
Mallard in February 2011

Mallard's early career was in marketing and advertising. In 1995 he took a career sabbatical and established a small business in horticulture with his brother in the inner city suburb of Darlinghurst.

Mallard, who is gay, is in a same-sex relationship with Danish born Jesper Hansen. On 20 July 2012 it was reported that they would marry in a Lutheran Church in Copenhagen in 2013.
