= Mallard (surname) =

Mallard is a surname. Notable people with the surname include:

- Andrew Mallard (1962–2019), wrongfully convicted of murder in Perth, Western Australia
- Chante Jawan Mallard (born 1976), African American woman from Texas who was convicted of the murder of Gregory Glenn Biggs and sentenced to 50 years imprisonment
- Ernest-François Mallard (1833–1894), French mineralogist
- Felix Mallard (born 1998), Australian actor
- Henri Mallard (1884–1967), Australian photographer of the construction of Sydney Harbour Bridge
- John Mallard (1927–2021), Professor of Medical Physics at the University of Aberdeen
- John Mallard (cricketer) (1860–1935), New Zealand cricketer and insurance executive
- Josh Mallard (born 1980), American football defensive end
- Rob Mallard (born 1992), English actor
- Robert Mallard (c. 1911–1948), American lynching victim
- Sax Mallard (1915–1986), American jazz saxophonist
- Shayne Mallard (born 1964), political figure in the inner Sydney area
- Trevor Mallard (born 1954), New Zealand politician
- Wesly Mallard (born 1978), American football linebacker
