= Alard–Baron Knoop Stradivarius =

1715 antique violin by Antonio Stradivari

The Alard–Baron Knoop Stradivarius of 1715 is an antique violin made by luthier Antonio Stradivari of Cremona (1644–1737). It was made during Stradivari's golden period and is regarded as the "finest of the fine," and nec plus ultra by W.E. Hill & Sons. The Alard has the original neck with the initials "PS" found in the mortise of the head believed to be those of son, Paolo Stradivari. The Hill brothers conclude this violin is one of the instruments that came into Paolo's possession upon the death of his brother Francesco in 1742.

The Alard Stradivarius receives its name from French violinist Jean-Delphin Alard, its most famed owner. Upon the publication of the Hill brothers' work on Stradivari in 1902, The Alard was in the possession of Baron Knoop (1846–1918). The instrument sold at auction in 1981 to a collector in Singapore for US$1.2 million.

In the 19th century leading French violin maker Jean-Baptiste Vuillaume made a close copy of the Alard, which today is played by American virtuoso Hilary Hahn.

== See also ==
- List of Stradivarius instruments
- Stradivarius
