= Hallard =

Hallard is a surname. Notable people with the surname include:

- C. M. Hallard (1865–1942), Scottish actor
- Frederick Hallard (1821–1882), Scottish advocate and legal author
- Ian Hallard (born 1974), English actor
- Nick Hallard (born 1975), English artist
- Philip Purser-Hallard (born 1971), British science fiction author
- Steven Hallard (born 1965), British Olympic archer

== Given name ==
- Hallard Croft (1936–2025), English mathematician
- Hallard White (1929–2016), New Zealand rugby player

== Other uses ==
- Purser-Hallard
