= Electoral results for the district of Wollondilly =

Election results for Wollondilly, New South Wales, Australia

Wollondilly, an electoral district of the Legislative Assembly in the Australian state of New South Wales, has had two incarnations, the first from 1904 to 1981 and the second from 2007 to the present. It returned 3 members between 1920 and 1927.

== Members ==
First incarnation (1894–1981)
Election	Member	Party				
1904	William McCourt	Liberal Reform				
1907	William McCourt	Liberal Reform				
1910	William McCourt	Liberal Reform				
1913	William McCourt	Liberal Reform				
1913 by	Frank Badgery	Liberal Reform				
1915 by	Sir George Fuller	Liberal Reform				
1917	Sir George Fuller	Nationalist	Member	Party	Member	Party
1920	Sir George Fuller	Nationalist	Billy Davies	Labor	John Cleary	Labor
1922	Sir George Fuller	Nationalist	Billy Davies	Labor	Mark Morton	Nationalist
1925	Sir George Fuller	Nationalist	Billy Davies	Labor	Andrew Lysaght	Labor
1927	Sir George Fuller	Nationalist				
1928 by	Mark Morton	Nationalist				
1930	Mark Morton	Nationalist				
1932	Mark Morton	United Australia				
1935	Mark Morton	United Australia				
1938	Mark Morton	United Australia				
1938 by	Jeff Bate	United Australia				
1941	Jeff Bate	United Australia				
1944	Jeff Bate	Democratic				
1947	Jeff Bate	Liberal				
1950 by	Blake Pelly	Liberal				
1953	Blake Pelly	Liberal				
1956	Blake Pelly	Liberal				
1957 by	Tom Lewis	Liberal				
1959	Tom Lewis	Liberal				
1962	Tom Lewis	Liberal				
1965	Tom Lewis	Liberal				
1968	Tom Lewis	Liberal				
1971	Tom Lewis	Liberal				
1973	Tom Lewis	Liberal				
1976	Tom Lewis	Liberal				
1978	Bill Knott	Labor				
Second incarnation (2007–present)
Election	Member	Party				
2007	Phil Costa	Labor				
2011	Jai Rowell	Liberal				
2015	Jai Rowell	Liberal				
2019	Nathaniel Smith	Liberal				
2023	Judy Hannan	Independent				

== Election results ==
=== Elections in the 2020s ===
==== 2023 ====
2023 New South Wales state election: Wollondilly
Party	Candidate	Votes	%	±%
Liberal	Nathaniel Smith	17,712	33.8	−4.7
Independent	Judy Hannan	13,586	25.9	+6.1
Labor	Angus Braiden	11,505	22.0	+6.9
One Nation	Rebecca Thompson	6,158	11.8	+0.7
Greens	Jason Webster	2,616	5.0	−0.6
Sustainable Australia	Ildiko Haag	792	1.5	+1.5
Total formal votes		52,369	96.9	+0.4
Informal votes		1,698	3.1	−0.4
Turnout		54,067	90.5	−0.2
Notional two-party-preferred count
Liberal	Nathaniel Smith	22,300	55.0	−9.1
Labor	Angus Braiden	18,212	45.0	+9.1
Two-candidate-preferred result
Independent	Judy Hannan	21,588	51.5	+7.5
Liberal	Nathaniel Smith	20,312	48.5	−7.5
Independent gain from Liberal		Swing	+7.5	

=== Elections in the 2010s ===
==== 2019 ====
2019 New South Wales state election: Wollondilly
Party	Candidate	Votes	%	±%
Liberal	Nathaniel Smith	19,351	37.95	−20.00
Independent	Judy Hannan	10,258	20.12	+20.12
Labor	Jo-Ann Davidson	7,723	15.15	−9.08
One Nation	Charlie Fenton	5,712	11.20	+11.20
Shooters, Fishers, Farmers	Jason Bolwell	3,235	6.34	+6.34
Greens	David Powell	2,847	5.58	−2.80
Animal Justice	Heather Edwards	1,326	2.60	+2.60
Liberal Democrats	Mitchell Black	537	1.05	+1.05
Total formal votes		50,989	96.35	+0.11
Informal votes		1,934	3.65	−0.11
Turnout		52,923	92.21	−0.69
Two-party-preferred result
Liberal	Nathaniel Smith	22,925	63.83	−3.46
Labor	Jo-Ann Davidson	12,988	36.17	+3.46
Two-candidate-preferred result
Liberal	Nathaniel Smith	21,113	55.50	−11.80
Independent	Judy Hannan	16,931	44.50	+44.50
Liberal hold		Swing	−11.80	

==== 2015 ====
2015 New South Wales state election: Wollondilly
Party	Candidate	Votes	%	±%
Liberal	Jai Rowell	27,345	58.0	+2.1
Labor	Ciaran O'Brien	11,429	24.2	+5.3
Greens	Patrick Darley-Jones	3,957	8.4	+1.1
Independent	Lynette Styles	1,821	3.9	+3.9
Christian Democrats	Susan Pinsuti	1,559	3.3	−0.2
No Land Tax	Maria Foia	1,073	2.3	+2.3
Total formal votes		47,184	96.2	+0.5
Informal votes		1,844	3.8	−0.5
Turnout		49,028	92.9	−0.2
Two-party-preferred result
Liberal	Jai Rowell	28,795	67.3	−4.3
Labor	Ciaran O'Brien	13,994	32.7	+4.3
Liberal hold		Swing	−4.3	

==== 2011 ====
2011 New South Wales state election: Wollondilly
Party	Candidate	Votes	%	±%
Liberal	Jai Rowell	22,632	49.9	+10.6
Labor	Phil Costa	11,558	25.5	−18.8
Hatton's Independent Team	Judy Hannan	4,971	11.0	+11.0
Greens	Jess Di Blasio	2,432	5.4	−1.6
Outdoor Recreation	Clinton Mead	2,104	4.6	+4.6
Christian Democrats	Chris Dalton	1,669	3.7	+3.7
Total formal votes		45,366	95.4	−1.0
Informal votes		2,183	4.6	+1.0
Turnout		47,549	94.5	
Two-party-preferred result
Liberal	Jai Rowell	24,861	64.7	+18.0
Labor	Phil Costa	13,559	35.3	−18.0
Liberal gain from Labor		Swing	+18.0	

=== Elections in the 2000s ===
==== 2007 ====
2007 New South Wales state election: Wollondilly
Party	Candidate	Votes	%	±%
Labor	Phil Costa	18,652	44.3	−2.4
Liberal	Sharryn Hilton	16,524	39.2	−0.3
Independent	Danny Stewart	3,069	7.3	+7.3
Greens	Geraldine Hunt	2,931	7.0	+0.9
Independent	Maurice Nelmes	926	2.2	+2.2
Total formal votes		42,102	96.4	−0.8
Informal votes		1,577	3.6	+0.8
Turnout		43,679	93.9	
Two-party-preferred result
Labor	Phil Costa	20,803	53.3	−1.3
Liberal	Sharryn Hilton	18,226	46.7	+1.3
Labor notional hold		Swing	−1.3	

District re-created

==== 1981–2007 ====
District abolished District abolished

=== Elections in the 1970s ===
==== 1978 ====
1978 New South Wales state election: Wollondilly
Party	Candidate	Votes	%	±%
Liberal	Peter Reynolds	13,074	43.1	−9.1
Labor	Bill Knott	13,005	42.8	+3.7
Independent	Robert Wilson	2,647	8.7	+8.7
Democrats	Paul Stocker	1,631	5.4	+5.4
Total formal votes		30,357	98.5	−0.2
Informal votes		475	1.5	+0.2
Turnout		30,832	93.5	−0.1
Two-party-preferred result
Labor	Bill Knott	15,313	50.4	+8.0
Liberal	Peter Reynolds	15,044	49.6	−8.0
Labor gain from Liberal		Swing	+8.0	

==== 1976 ====
1976 New South Wales state election: Wollondilly
Party	Candidate	Votes	%	±%
Liberal	Tom Lewis	14,514	52.2	−3.1
Labor	Bill Knott	10,883	39.1	+7.9
Workers	Victor Thomas	1,526	5.5	+5.5
Independent	William Tangye	880	3.2	+3.2
Total formal votes		27,803	98.7	+0.4
Informal votes		379	1.3	−0.4
Turnout		28,182	93.6	+1.3
Two-party-preferred result
Liberal	Tom Lewis	16,023	57.6	−4.4
Labor	Bill Knott	11,780	42.4	+4.4
Liberal hold		Swing	−4.4	

==== 1973 ====
1973 New South Wales state election: Wollondilly
Party	Candidate	Votes	%	±%
Liberal	Tom Lewis	13,426	55.3	−0.4
Labor	Bill Knott	7,582	31.2	−5.0
Independent	Dianne Allen	1,714	7.1	+7.1
Australia	Jill Kerr	1,007	4.2	+4.2
Democratic Labor	Bernard McRae	554	2.3	−1.8
Total formal votes		24,283	98.3	
Informal votes		415	1.7	
Turnout		24,698	92.3	
Two-party-preferred result
Liberal	Tom Lewis	15,055	62.0	+1.0
Labor	Bill Knott	9,228	38.0	−1.0
Liberal hold		Swing	+1.0	

==== 1971 ====
1971 New South Wales state election: Wollondilly
Party	Candidate	Votes	%	±%
Liberal	Tom Lewis	11,538	55.7	−9.3
Labor	John Kerin	7,506	36.2	+1.2
Democratic Labor	Kevin Harrold	858	4.1	+4.1
Independent	Alexander Gould	814	3.9	+3.9
Total formal votes		20,716	98.5	
Informal votes		323	1.5	
Turnout		21,039	94.3	
Two-party-preferred result
Liberal	Tom Lewis	12,631	61.0	−4.0
Labor	John Kerin	8,085	39.0	+4.0
Liberal hold		Swing	−4.0	

=== Elections in the 1960s ===
==== 1968 ====
1968 New South Wales state election: Wollondilly
Party	Candidate	Votes	%	±%
Liberal	Tom Lewis	10,652	59.2	+0.4
Labor	Bernard Carroll	7,330	40.8	+5.1
Total formal votes		17,982	97.7	
Informal votes		425	2.3	
Turnout		18,407	95.3	
Liberal hold		Swing	−2.4	

==== 1965 ====
1965 New South Wales state election: Wollondilly
Party	Candidate	Votes	%	±%
Liberal	Tom Lewis	14,933	58.8	+1.9
Labor	Patrick O'Halloran	9,050	35.7	−7.4
Independent	James Downing	1,405	5.5	+5.5
Total formal votes		25,388	98.7	−0.3
Informal votes		341	1.3	+0.3
Turnout		25,729	95.1	+0.2
Two-party-preferred result
Liberal	Tom Lewis	15,636	61.6	+4.7
Labor	Patrick O'Halloran	9,752	38.4	−4.7
Liberal hold		Swing	+4.7	

==== 1962 ====
1962 New South Wales state election: Wollondilly
Party	Candidate	Votes	%	±%
Liberal	Tom Lewis	12,825	56.9	+0.2
Labor	Jack Wharton	9,719	43.1	−0.2
Total formal votes		22,544	99.0	
Informal votes		234	1.0	
Turnout		22,778	94.9	
Liberal hold		Swing	+0.2	

=== Elections in the 1950s ===
==== 1959 ====
1959 New South Wales state election: Wollondilly
Party	Candidate	Votes	%	±%
Liberal	Tom Lewis	12,591	60.9	
Labor	Ernest Seager	8,091	39.1	
Total formal votes		20,682	98.6	
Informal votes		284	1.4	
Turnout		20,966	95.3	
Liberal hold		Swing		

==== 1957 by-election ====
1957 Wollondilly by-election Saturday 24 October
Party	Candidate	Votes	%	±%
Liberal	Tom Lewis	8,483	52.0	
Labor	Ern Seager	5,155	31.6	
Independent	Murrum Sweet	2,666	16.4	
Total formal votes		16,304	98.6	
Informal votes		236	1.4	
Turnout		16,540	86.2	
Liberal hold		Swing		

Blake Pelly (Liberal) resigned.

==== 1956 ====
1956 New South Wales state election: Wollondilly
Party	Candidate	Votes	%	±%
Liberal	Blake Pelly	11,675	65.2	+8.3
Labor	Ernest Seager	6,220	34.8	−8.3
Total formal votes		17,895	98.9	+0.3
Informal votes		204	1.1	−0.3
Turnout		18,099	94.6	+0.4
Liberal hold		Swing	+8.3	

==== 1953 ====
1953 New South Wales state election: Wollondilly
Party	Candidate	Votes	%	±%
Liberal	Blake Pelly	9,747	56.9	
Labor	Albert Hughes	7,392	43.1	
Total formal votes		17,139	98.6	
Informal votes		248	1.4	
Turnout		17,387	94.2	
Liberal hold		Swing		

==== 1950 ====
1950 New South Wales state election: Wollondilly
Party	Candidate	Votes	%	±%
Liberal	Blake Pelly	8,615	65.9	
Independent	Gerard Wylie	3,323	25.4	
Independent	Erle Sampson	1,127	8.6	
Total formal votes		13,065	96.7	
Informal votes		445	3.3	
Turnout		13,510	91.6	
Liberal hold		Swing	N/A	

- Preferences were not distributed.

==== 1950 by-election ====
1950 Wollondilly by-election Monday 23 January
Party	Candidate	Votes	%	±%
Liberal	Blake Pelly	unopposed		
Liberal hold				

Jeff Bate (Liberal) resigned to successfully contest the 1949 election for Macarthur.

=== Elections in the 1940s ===
==== 1947 ====
1947 New South Wales state election: Wollondilly
Party	Candidate	Votes	%	±%
Liberal	Jeff Bate	9,919	66.4	+0.9
Labor	James Walsh	5,013	33.6	+33.6
Total formal votes		14,932	98.8	+1.9
Informal votes		184	1.2	−1.9
Turnout		15,116	94.5	+6.1
Liberal hold		Swing	N/A	

==== 1944 ====
1944 New South Wales state election: Wollondilly
Party	Candidate	Votes	%	±%
Democratic	Jeff Bate	8,305	65.5	−34.5
Independent Labor	Patrick Kenna	2,432	19.2	+19.2
Liberal Democratic	Gerald Wylie	1,934	15.3	+15.3
Total formal votes		12,671	96.9	
Informal votes		403	3.1	
Turnout		13,074	88.4	
Democratic hold		Swing	N/A	

==== 1941 ====
1941 New South Wales state election: Wollondilly
Party	Candidate	Votes	%	±%
United Australia	Jeff Bate	unopposed		
United Australia hold				

=== Elections in the 1930s ===
==== 1938 by-election ====
1938 Wollondilly by-election Saturday 12 November
Party	Candidate	Votes	%	±%
United Australia	Jeff Bate	2,255	19.0	
Independent	Thomas Gilmore	2,326	19.6	
Independent	Tom Mack	1,918	16.2	
United Australia	Henry Morton	1,509	12.7	
United Australia	Peter Loughlin	1,379	11.6	
United Australia	Herbert Venables	1,312	11.1	
United Australia	William Pickles	603	5.1	
Ind. United Australia	Walter Moss	503	4.2	
Independent	James Graham	56	0.5	
Total formal votes		11,861	93.7	
Informal votes		804	6.4	
Turnout		12,665	89.8	
Two-party-preferred result
United Australia	Jeff Bate	6,821	57.5	
Independent	Thomas Gilmore	5,040	42.5	
United Australia hold		Swing	N/A	

Mark Morton (United Australia) died.

==== 1938 ====
1938 New South Wales state election: Wollondilly
Party	Candidate	Votes	%	±%
United Australia	Mark Morton	unopposed		
United Australia hold				

==== 1935 ====
1935 New South Wales state election: Wollondilly
Party	Candidate	Votes	%	±%
United Australia	Mark Morton	unopposed		
United Australia hold				

==== 1932 ====
1932 New South Wales state election: Wollondilly
Party	Candidate	Votes	%	±%
United Australia	Mark Morton	8,971	70.6	+14.3
Labor (NSW)	John Cleary	3,232	25.4	−18.3
Federal Labor	Patrick Kenna	500	3.9	+3.9
Total formal votes		12,703	98.8	+0.3
Informal votes		157	1.2	−0.3
Turnout		12,860	96.1	+0.2
United Australia hold		Swing	N/A	

- Preferences were not distributed.

==== 1930 ====
1930 New South Wales state election: Wollondilly
Party	Candidate	Votes	%	±%
Nationalist	Mark Morton	7,215	56.3	
Labor	Edward Burns	5,601	43.7	
Total formal votes		12,816	98.5	
Informal votes		190	1.5	
Turnout		13,006	95.9	
Nationalist hold		Swing		

=== Elections in the 1920s ===
==== 1928 by-election ====
1928 Wollondilly by-election Saturday 3 March
Party	Candidate	Votes	%	±%
Nationalist	Mark Morton	5,773	61.1	−1.4
Labor	Daniel Chalker	3,681	38.9	+1.4
Total formal votes		9,454	99.5	+0.6
Informal votes		43	0.5	−0.6
Turnout		9,497	65.6	−16.2
Nationalist hold		Swing	−1.4	

Sir George Fuller (Nationalist) resigned to be appointed Agent-General in London.

==== 1927 ====
This section is an excerpt from 1927 New South Wales state election § Wollondilly

1927 New South Wales state election: Wollondilly
Party	Candidate	Votes	%	±%
Nationalist	George Fuller	7,249	62.5	
Labor	Daniel Chalker	4,342	37.5	
Total formal votes		11,591	98.9	
Informal votes		132	1.1	
Turnout		11,723	81.8	
Nationalist win		(new seat)		

==== 1925 ====
This section is an excerpt from 1925 New South Wales state election § Wollondilly

1925 New South Wales state election: Wollondilly
Party	Candidate	Votes	%	±%
Quota		7,924		
Labor	Billy Davies (elected 1)	12,428	39.2	+10.8
Labor	Andrew Lysaght (elected 3)	3,525	11.1	+11.1
Labor	Patrick Malloy	417	1.3	+1.3
Nationalist	Sir George Fuller (elected 2)	11,144	35.2	−4.6
Nationalist	Mark Morton (defeated)	3,148	9.9	−1.3
Nationalist	Alexander South	141	0.4	+0.4
Progressive	William Howarth	673	2.1	−0.4
Ind. Nationalist	Samuel Emmett	204	0.4	+0.4
Independent	Edward Newton	10	0.03	+0.03
Total formal votes		31,690	97.4	+1.1
Informal votes		830	2.6	−1.1
Turnout		32,520	75.0	−0.4
Party total votes
Labor		16,370	51.7	+8.5
Nationalist		14,433	45.5	−7.8
Progressive		673	2.1	−0.4
Ind. Nationalist	Samuel Emmett	204	0.4	+0.4
Independent	Edward Newton	10	0.03	+0.03

==== 1922 ====
This section is an excerpt from 1922 New South Wales state election § Wollondilly

1922 New South Wales state election: Wollondilly
Party	Candidate	Votes	%	±%
Quota		7,222		
Nationalist	Sir George Fuller (elected 1)	11,507	39.8	+11.6
Nationalist	Mark Morton (elected 3)	3,229	11.2	−6.5
Nationalist	Samuel Emmett	647	2.2	+2.2
Labor	Billy Davies (elected 2)	8,208	28.4	−9.5
Labor	John Cleary (defeated)	4,158	14.4	+6.5
Labor	Walter Thompson	100	0.4	+0.4
Progressive	William Howarth	711	2.5	+2.5
Independent	Arthur Silvey-Reardon	324	1.1	−0.6
Total formal votes		28,884	96.3	+2.2
Informal votes		1,121	3.7	−2.2
Turnout		30,005	75.4	+14.9
Party total votes
Nationalist		15,383	53.2	+7.3
Labor		12,466	43.2	−9.2
Progressive		711	2.5	+2.5
Independent	Arthur Silvey-Reardon	324	1.1	−0.6

==== 1920 ====
This section is an excerpt from 1920 New South Wales state election § Wollondilly

1920 New South Wales state election: Wollondilly
Party	Candidate	Votes	%	±%
Quota		5,562		
Labor	Billy Davies (elected 1)	8,440	37.9	
Labor	John Cleary (elected 3)	1,756	7.9	
Labor	Daniel Chalker	1,471	6.6	
Nationalist	George Fuller (elected 2)	6,267	28.2	
Nationalist	Mark Morton (defeated)	3,935	17.7	
Independent	Arthur Silvey-Reardon	375	1.7	
Total formal votes		22,244	94.1	
Informal votes		1,401	5.9	
Turnout		23,645	60.5	
Party total votes
Labor		11,667	52.5	
Nationalist		10,202	45.9	
Independent	Arthur Silvey-Reardon	375	1.7	

=== Elections in the 1910s ===
==== 1917 ====
This section is an excerpt from 1917 New South Wales state election § Wollondilly

1917 New South Wales state election: Wollondilly
Party	Candidate	Votes	%	±%
Nationalist	George Fuller	4,425	56.8	−0.8
Labor	Daniel Chalker	3,364	43.2	+9.3
Total formal votes		7,789	99.1	+1.9
Informal votes		71	0.9	−1.9
Turnout		7,860	65.6	−0.8
Nationalist hold		Swing	−0.8	

==== 1915 by-election ====
1915 Wollondilly by-election Thursday 16 September
Party	Candidate	Votes	%	±%
Liberal Reform	George Fuller	unopposed		
Liberal Reform hold				

Frank Badgery (Liberal Reform) died.

==== 1913 ====
This section is an excerpt from 1913 New South Wales state election § Wollondilly

1913 New South Wales state election: Wollondilly
Party	Candidate	Votes	%	±%
Liberal Reform	Frank Badgery	3,801	57.6	
Labor	James Donaldson	2,238	33.9	
Country Party Association	Samuel Emmett	290	4.4	
Independent Liberal	Thomas Raw	266	4.0	
Total formal votes		6,595	97.2	
Informal votes		188	2.8	
Turnout		6,783	66.4	
Liberal Reform hold				

==== 1913 by-election ====
1913 Wollondilly by-election Saturday 19 July
Party	Candidate	Votes	%	±%
Liberal Reform	Frank Badgery	2,724	60.3	−4.7
Labour	John Masters	1,765	39.1	+4.1
Independent	John Pearson	29	0.6	
Total formal votes		4,518	99.2	+1.3
Informal votes		147	0.8	−1.3
Turnout		4,553	55.2 (Note: estimate based on an electoral roll of 7,826 at the 1910 election.)	−12.8
Liberal Reform hold		Swing	−4.7	

William McCourt (Liberal Reform) died.

==== 1910 ====
1910 New South Wales state election: Wollondilly
Party	Candidate	Votes	%	±%
Liberal Reform	William McCourt	3,383	65.0	
Labour	Charles Fern	1,825	35.0	
Total formal votes		5,208	97.9	
Informal votes		112	2.1	
Turnout		5,320	68.0	
Liberal Reform hold				

=== Elections in the 1900s ===
==== 1907 ====
This section is an excerpt from 1907 New South Wales state election § Wollondilly

1907 New South Wales state election: Wollondilly
Party	Candidate	Votes	%	±%
Liberal Reform	William McCourt	3,220	78.1	
Independent	Leonard Green	671	16.3	
Labour	Laurence Gilmartin	232	5.6	
Total formal votes		4,123	96.4	
Informal votes		153	3.6	
Turnout		4,276	56.3	
Liberal Reform hold				

==== 1904 ====
This section is an excerpt from 1904 New South Wales state election § Wollondilly

1904 New South Wales state election: Wollondilly
Party	Candidate	Votes	%	±%
Liberal Reform	William McCourt	2,266	55.2	
Independent Liberal	Sidney Innes-Noad	1,824	44.4	
Independent	Theodore Corby	16	0.4	
Total formal votes		4,106	98.9	
Informal votes		44	1.1	
Turnout		4,150	57.4	
Liberal Reform win		(new seat)		

Wollondilly was a new seat comprising parts of the abolished seats of Bowral and Argyle and parts of Camden and Hartley. William McCourt (Liberal Reform) was the member for Bowral. The member for Hartley was John Hurley (Independent) who successfully retained that seat. The member for Argyle was Thomas Rose (Liberal Reform) who unsuccessfully contested Belubula. The member for Camden was John Kidd (Progressive) who unsuccessfully contested Camden.
