= Electoral results for the district of South Coast =

South Coast, an electoral district of the Legislative Assembly in the Australian state of New South Wales, was created in 1927.

== Members for South Coast ==
Election	Member	Party
1927	Henry Bate	Nationalist
1930	Henry Bate	Nationalist
1932	Henry Bate	United Australia
1935	Henry Bate	United Australia
1938	Henry Bate	United Australia
1941	Rupert Beale	Independent
1942 by	Jack Beale	Independent
1944	Jack Beale	Independent
1947	Jack Beale	Independent
1950	Jack Beale	Liberal
1953	Jack Beale	Liberal
1956	Jack Beale	Liberal
1959	Jack Beale	Liberal
1962	Jack Beale	Liberal
1965	Jack Beale	Liberal
1968	Jack Beale	Liberal
1973	John Hatton	Independent
1976	John Hatton	Independent
1978	John Hatton	Independent
1981	John Hatton	Independent
1984	John Hatton	Independent
1988	John Hatton	Independent
1991	John Hatton	Independent
1995	Eric Ellis	Liberal
1999	Wayne Smith	Labor
2003	Shelley Hancock	Liberal
2007	Shelley Hancock	Liberal
2011	Shelley Hancock	Liberal
2015	Shelley Hancock	Liberal
2019	Shelley Hancock	Liberal
2023	Liza Butler	Labor

== Election results ==
=== Elections in the 2020s ===
==== 2023 ====
2023 New South Wales state election: South Coast
Party	Candidate	Votes	%	±%
Liberal	Luke Sikora	17,806	34.72	−20.81
Labor	Liza Butler	17,414	33.96	+2.75
Greens	Amanda Findley	8,021	15.64	+2.38
Shooters, Fishers, Farmers	Robert Korten	3,996	7.79	+7.79
Independent	Nina Digiglio	3,284	6.40	+6.40
Sustainable Australia	Deanna Buffier	764	1.49	+1.49
Total formal votes		51,285	96.61	+0.55
Informal votes		1,797	3.39	−0.55
Turnout		53,082	87.56	−1.84
Two-party-preferred result
Labor	Liza Butler	23,068	53.77	+14.32
Liberal	Luke Sikora	19,834	46.23	−14.32
Labor gain from Liberal		Swing	+14.32	

=== Elections in the 2010s ===
==== 2019 ====
2019 New South Wales state election: South Coast
Party	Candidate	Votes	%	±%
Liberal	Shelley Hancock	27,143	55.53	+3.04
Labor	Annette Alldrick	15,256	31.21	+0.83
Greens	Kim Stephenson	6,481	13.26	+0.32
Total formal votes		48,880	96.06	−0.86
Informal votes		2,007	3.94	+0.86
Turnout		50,887	89.40	−0.79
Two-party-preferred result
Liberal	Shelley Hancock	27,902	60.55	+0.93
Labor	Annette Alldrick	18,178	39.45	−0.93
Liberal hold		Swing	+0.93	

==== 2015 ====
2015 New South Wales state election: South Coast
Party	Candidate	Votes	%	±%
Liberal	Shelley Hancock	24,040	52.5	−7.5
Labor	Fiona Phillips	13,915	30.4	+7.8
Greens	Amanda Findley	5,927	12.9	−0.1
Christian Democrats	Matt Rose	1,208	2.6	−1.8
No Land Tax	Licio Mallia	706	1.5	+1.5
Total formal votes		45,796	96.9	+0.9
Informal votes		1,458	3.1	−0.9
Turnout		47,254	90.2	−1.2
Two-party-preferred result
Liberal	Shelley Hancock	25,136	59.6	−10.5
Labor	Fiona Phillips	17,026	40.4	+10.5
Liberal hold		Swing	−10.5	

==== 2011 ====
2011 New South Wales state election: South Coast
Party	Candidate	Votes	%	±%
Liberal	Shelley Hancock	27,580	60.3	+11.2
Labor	Glenn Sims	10,225	22.3	−10.6
Greens	Amanda Findley	5,888	12.9	+3.6
Christian Democrats	Bohdan Brumerskyj	2,059	4.5	−1.8
Total formal votes		45,752	97.0	−0.9
Informal votes		1,399	3.0	+0.9
Turnout		47,151	92.9	
Two-party-preferred result
Liberal	Shelley Hancock	29,347	70.4	+12.6
Labor	Glenn Sims	12,342	29.6	−12.6
Liberal hold		Swing	+12.6	

=== Elections in the 2000s ===
==== 2007 ====
2007 New South Wales state election: South Coast
Party	Candidate	Votes	%	±%
Liberal	Shelley Hancock	21,111	49.0	+10.6
Labor	Michelle Miran	14,183	32.9	−2.9
Greens	Amanda Findley	3,973	9.2	+3.2
Christian Democrats	Paul Green	2,733	6.3	+3.9
AAFI	Rex Dobson	1,050	2.4	+2.4
Total formal votes		43,050	98.0	+0.1
Informal votes		900	2.0	−0.1
Turnout		43,950	93.1	
Two-party-preferred result
Liberal	Shelley Hancock	23,167	57.8	+6.2
Labor	Michelle Miran	16,921	42.2	−6.2
Liberal hold		Swing	+6.2	

==== 2003 ====
2003 New South Wales state election: South Coast
Party	Candidate	Votes	%	±%
Liberal	Shelley Hancock	17,230	38.6	−1.3
Labor	Wayne Smith	15,357	34.4	−5.8
Independent	Barry McCaffery	4,043	9.1	+9.1
Independent	Greg Watson	3,053	6.8	+6.8
Greens	Jane Bange	2,549	5.7	+0.6
Christian Democrats	Steve Ryan	1,269	2.8	−0.5
Independent	Pam Arnold	646	1.4	+1.4
One Nation	Carmelo Savoca	499	1.1	−9.3
Total formal votes		44,646	98.0	−0.2
Informal votes		927	2.0	+0.2
Turnout		45,573	93.0	
Two-party-preferred result
Liberal	Shelley Hancock	20,438	52.8	+3.3
Labor	Wayne Smith	18,287	47.2	−3.3
Liberal gain from Labor		Swing	+3.3	

=== Elections in the 1990s ===
==== 1999 ====
1999 New South Wales state election: South Coast
Party	Candidate	Votes	%	±%
Labor	Wayne Smith	16,543	40.2	+10.1
Liberal	Eric Ellis	16,425	39.9	−3.9
One Nation	Melinda Warn	4,274	10.4	+10.4
Greens	Jane Bange	2,086	5.1	−0.1
Christian Democrats	Steve Ryan	1,378	3.3	+0.9
AAFI	Chris Bowen	479	1.2	+1.2
Total formal votes		41,185	98.2	+2.4
Informal votes		757	1.8	−2.4
Turnout		41,942	93.7	
Two-party-preferred result
Labor	Wayne Smith	18,651	50.5	+5.1
Liberal	Eric Ellis	18,276	49.5	−5.1
Labor gain from Liberal		Swing	+5.1	

==== 1995 ====
1995 New South Wales state election: South Coast
Party	Candidate	Votes	%	±%
Liberal	Eric Ellis	14,685	42.9	+14.4
Labor	Veronica Husted	9,904	28.9	+11.5
Independent	John Hatton (Note: Sitting Independent MP John Edward Hatton Sr retired. His son John Edward Hatton Jr contested the seat, after being advised by his father against a career in politics.)	6,487	18.9	−32.4
Greens	May Leatch	1,724	5.0	+5.0
Call to Australia	Glen Ryan	929	2.7	0.0
Independent	Margaret Hutton	540	1.6	+1.6
Total formal votes		34,269	95.9	+2.4
Informal votes		1,467	4.1	−2.4
Turnout		35,736	94.2	
Two-party-preferred result
Liberal	Eric Ellis	16,815	54.6	+22.9
Labor	Veronica Husted	13,959	45.4	+45.4
Liberal gain from Independent		Swing	+22.9	

The sitting member John Hatton (Independent) did not contest the election.

==== 1991 ====
1991 New South Wales state election: South Coast
Party	Candidate	Votes	%	±%
Independent	John Hatton	15,327	51.4	+11.2
Liberal	Graeme Hurst	8,499	28.5	−5.5
Labor	Veronica Hursted	5,199	17.4	−1.6
Call to Australia	Neil McLean	815	2.7	−0.5
Total formal votes		29,840	93.5	−4.5
Informal votes		2,071	6.5	+4.5
Turnout		31,911	93.5	
Two-candidate-preferred result
Independent	John Hatton	19,416	68.3	+8.2
Liberal	Graeme Hurst	9,028	31.7	−8.2
Independent hold		Swing	+8.2	

=== Elections in the 1980s ===
==== 1988 ====
1988 New South Wales state election: South Coast
Party	Candidate	Votes	%	±%
Independent	John Hatton	14,272	46.2	−13.8
Liberal	Graeme Hurst	9,703	31.4	+13.1
Labor	Robyn Drysdale	5,826	18.9	−1.3
Call to Australia	Peter Burge	1,064	3.4	+3.4
Total formal votes		30,865	97.9	−0.7
Informal votes		672	2.1	+0.7
Turnout		31,537	93.1	
Two-candidate-preferred result
Independent	John Hatton	19,426	64.7	−10.2
Liberal	Graeme Hurst	10,582	35.3	+10.2
Independent hold		Swing	−10.2	

==== 1984 ====
1984 New South Wales state election: South Coast
Party	Candidate	Votes	%	±%
Independent	John Hatton	21,497	61.4	
Labor	Robyn Drysdale	6,906	19.7	
Liberal	David Egan	6,633	18.9	
Total formal votes		35,036	98.6	
Informal votes		503	1.4	
Turnout		35,539	92.5	
Two-candidate-preferred result
Independent	John Hatton		76.0	
Labor	Robyn Drysdale		24.0	
Independent hold		Swing	N/A	

- Hatton was elected unopposed at the previous election.

==== 1981 ====
1981 New South Wales state election: South Coast
Party	Candidate	Votes	%	±%
Independent	John Hatton	unopposed		
Independent hold				

=== Elections in the 1970s ===
==== 1978 ====
1978 New South Wales state election: South Coast
Party	Candidate	Votes	%	±%
Independent	John Hatton	21,895	70.5	+5.0
Liberal	Peter Ryan	9,160	29.5	−3.6
Total formal votes		31,055	98.4	−0.6
Informal votes		505	1.6	+0.6
Turnout		31,560	93.7	+0.2
Independent hold		Swing	+4.3	

==== 1976 ====
1976 New South Wales state election: South Coast
Party	Candidate	Votes	%	±%
Independent	John Hatton	18,362	65.5	+20.8
Liberal	Irwin Heaton	9,274	33.1	−2.4
Workers	Noel Dennett	385	1.4	+1.4
Total formal votes		28,021	99.0	+2.2
Informal votes		284	1.0	−2.2
Turnout		28,305	93.5	+0.4
Two-candidate-preferred result
Independent	John Hatton	18,555	66.2	+14.5
Liberal	Irwin Heaton	9,466	33.8	−14.5
Independent hold		Swing	+14.5	

==== 1973 ====
1973 New South Wales state election: South Coast
Party	Candidate	Votes	%	±%
Independent	John Hatton	10,421	44.7	−4.4
Liberal	Doug Otton	8,264	35.5	−15.4
Country	Alexander Cochrane	1,502	6.5	+6.5
Independent	Robert Coburn	1,440	6.2	+6.2
Country	Basil Emery	1,289	5.5	+5.5
Independent	Robert Burke	381	1.6	+1.6
Total formal votes		23,297	96.8	
Informal votes		764	3.2	
Turnout		24,061	93.1	
Two-candidate-preferred result
Independent	John Hatton	12,048	51.7	+2.6
Liberal	Doug Otton	11,249	48.3	−2.6
Independent gain from Liberal		Swing	+2.6	

The sitting member Jack Beale (Liberal) resigned from Parliament in October 1973.

==== 1971 ====
1971 New South Wales state election: South Coast
Party	Candidate	Votes	%	±%
Liberal	Jack Beale	9,633	50.9	−6.4
Independent	John Hatton	9,293	49.1	+6.4
Total formal votes		18,926	98.1	
Informal votes		362	1.9	
Turnout		19,288	94.7	
Liberal hold		Swing	−6.4	

=== Elections in the 1960s ===
==== 1968 ====
1968 New South Wales state election: South Coast
Party	Candidate	Votes	%	±%
Liberal	Jack Beale	12,165	57.3	−10.8
Independent	John Hatton	9,073	42.7	+10.8
Total formal votes		21,238	98.4	
Informal votes		334	1.6	
Turnout		21,572	94.2	
Liberal hold		Swing	−10.8	

==== 1965 ====
1965 New South Wales state election: South Coast
Party	Candidate	Votes	%	±%
Liberal	Jack Beale	15,465	68.1	+18.2
Independent	Noel Williams	7,240	31.9	+31.9
Total formal votes		22,705	98.2	−0.9
Informal votes		425	1.8	+0.9
Turnout		23,130	94.4	0.0
Liberal hold		Swing	N/A	

==== 1962 ====
1962 New South Wales state election: South Coast
Party	Candidate	Votes	%	±%
Liberal	Jack Beale	10,807	49.9	−15.6
Labor	John Seiffert	7,407	34.2	+34.2
Independent Liberal	Charles Shirley	3,436	15.9	+15.9
Total formal votes		21,650	99.1	
Informal votes		203	0.9	
Turnout		21,853	94.4	
Two-party-preferred result
Liberal	Jack Beale	13,289	61.4	−4.1
Labor	John Seiffert	8,361	38.6	+38.6
Liberal hold		Swing	N/A	

=== Elections in the 1950s ===
==== 1959 ====
1959 New South Wales state election: South Coast
Party	Candidate	Votes	%	±%
Liberal	Jack Beale	11,501	65.5	
Independent	Douglas Glass	6,049	34.5	
Total formal votes		17,550	98.8	
Informal votes		204	1.2	
Turnout		17,754	94.8	
Liberal hold		Swing		

==== 1956 ====
1956 New South Wales state election: South Coast
Party	Candidate	Votes	%	±%
Liberal	Jack Beale	11,795	68.5	+7.7
Labor	Allan Beaton	5,416	31.5	−7.7
Total formal votes		17,211	99.2	+0.4
Informal votes		132	0.8	−0.4
Turnout		17,343	94.1	+0.2
Liberal hold		Swing	+7.7	

==== 1953 ====
1953 New South Wales state election: South Coast
Party	Candidate	Votes	%	±%
Liberal	Jack Beale	9,874	60.8	
Labor	Alfred Berriman	6,376	39.2	
Total formal votes		16,250	98.8	
Informal votes		195	1.2	
Turnout		16,445	93.9	
Liberal hold		Swing		

==== 1950 ====
1950 New South Wales state election: South Coast
Party	Candidate	Votes	%	±%
Liberal	Jack Beale	10,340	67.5	
Labor	Alfred Berriman	4,980	32.5	
Total formal votes		15,320	98.1	
Informal votes		296	1.9	
Turnout		15,616	93.6	
Member changed to Liberal from Independent		Swing	N/A	

=== Elections in the 1940s ===
==== 1947 ====
1947 New South Wales state election: South Coast
Party	Candidate	Votes	%	±%
Independent	Jack Beale	8,682	61.9	+6.1
Liberal	Richard Bush	5,354	38.1	−23.1
Total formal votes		14,036	99.0	+0.7
Informal votes		141	1.0	−0.7
Turnout		14,177	95.8	+5.5
Independent hold		Swing	N/A	

==== 1944 ====
1944 New South Wales state election: South Coast
Party	Candidate	Votes	%	±%
Independent	Jack Beale	6,600	55.8	+5.6
Independent Labor	Herb Turner	2,138	18.1	+18.1
Democratic	Charles Woodhill	1,779	15.0	−34.8
Independent	Percy Treasure	1,313	11.1	+11.1
Total formal votes		11,830	98.3	−0.2
Informal votes		200	1.7	+0.2
Turnout		12,030	90.3	−2.5
Independent hold		Swing	N/A	

- Preferences were not distributed.

==== 1942 by-election ====
1942 South Coast by-election Saturday 14 November
Party	Candidate	Votes	%	±%
Independent	Jack Beale	7,915	72.9	
United Australia	Henry Bate	2,942	27.1	−22.7
Total formal votes		10,857	99.2	+0.7
Informal votes		86	0.8	−0.7
Turnout		10,943	84.0	−8.8
Independent hold		Swing	N/A	

Rupert Beale (Independent) died.

==== 1941 ====
1941 New South Wales state election: South Coast
Party	Candidate	Votes	%	±%
Independent	Rupert Beale	6,389	50.2	
United Australia	Henry Bate	6,350	49.8	
Total formal votes		12,739	98.5	
Informal votes		187	1.5	
Turnout		12,926	92.8	
Independent gain from United Australia		Swing		

=== Elections in the 1930s ===
==== 1938 ====
1938 New South Wales state election: South Coast
Party	Candidate	Votes	%	±%
United Australia	Henry Bate	unopposed		
United Australia hold				

==== 1935 ====
1935 New South Wales state election: South Coast
Party	Candidate	Votes	%	±%
United Australia	Henry Bate	9,142	64.7	−10.2
Labor (NSW)	Reginald Murphy	3,379	23.9	−1.2
Independent	Herb Turner	1,608	11.4	+11.4
Total formal votes		14,129	98.1	−0.5
Informal votes		267	1.9	+0.5
Turnout		14,396	95.8	−0.7
United Australia hold		Swing	N/A	

- Preferences were not distributed.

==== 1932 ====
1932 New South Wales state election: South Coast
Party	Candidate	Votes	%	±%
United Australia	Henry Bate	9,947	74.9	+16.3
Labor (NSW)	John Dooley	3,338	25.1	−9.0
Total formal votes		13,285	98.6	+1.5
Informal votes		186	1.4	−1.5
Turnout		13,471	96.5	+0.4
United Australia hold		Swing	N/A	

==== 1930 ====
1930 New South Wales state election: South Coast
Party	Candidate	Votes	%	±%
Nationalist	Henry Bate	7,374	58.6	
Labor	Thomas Robertson	4,285	34.1	
Independent	Edgar Maddrell	833	6.6	
Independent	Willie Hunt	86	0.7	
Total formal votes		12,578	97.1	
Informal votes		378	2.9	
Turnout		12,956	96.1	
Nationalist hold		Swing		

=== Elections in the 1920s ===
==== 1927 ====
1927 New South Wales state election: South Coast
Party	Candidate	Votes	%	±%
Nationalist	Henry Bate	8,188	72.1	
Labor	Francis Rifley	3,161	27.9	
Total formal votes		11,349	98.5	
Informal votes		176	1.5	
Turnout		11,525	78.7	
Nationalist win		(new seat)		
