= 1942 South Coast state by-election =

Election result for South Coast, New South Wales, Australia

A by-election was held on 14 November 1942 for the New South Wales Legislative Assembly seat of South Coast. It was triggered by the death of Rupert Beale, who was an independent MP.

== Dates ==
Date	Event
28 September 1942	Rupert Beale died.
19 October 1942	Writ of election issued by the Speaker of the Legislative Assembly.
26 October 1942	Day of nomination
14 November 1942	Polling day
27 November 1942	Return of writ

== Candidates ==
- Henry Bate (United Australia) was the former member for South Coast, who had been defeated by Rupert Beale by 39 votes at the 1941 election.
- Jack Beale (Independent) was the son of Rupert, and was an engineer on munition works with the New South Wales Department of Public Works.

== Result ==
1942 South Coast by-election Saturday 14 November
Party	Candidate	Votes	%	±%
Independent	Jack Beale	7,915	72.9	
United Australia	Henry Bate	2,942	27.1	−22.7
Total formal votes		10,857	99.2	+0.7
Informal votes		86	0.8	−0.7
Turnout		10,943	84.0	−8.8
Independent hold		Swing	N/A	

== Aftermath ==
Jack Beale went on to hold the seat for 30 years. He was an independent until 1948, after which he joined the Liberal Party.

== See also ==
- Electoral results for the district of South Coast
- List of New South Wales state by-elections
