= 1950 Wollondilly state by-election =

Election result for Wollondilly, New South Wales, Australia

A by-election was held for the New South Wales Legislative Assembly electorate of Wollondilly on 23 January 1950 because of the resignation of Jeff Bate (Liberal) to successfully contest the federal seat of Macarthur at the 1949 election.

== Dates ==
Date	Event
28 October 1949	Jeff Bate resigned.
10 December 1949	1949 federal election
17 January 1950	Writ of election issued by the Speaker of the Legislative Assembly.
23 January 1950	Nominations
11 February 1950	Polling day
13 March 1950	Return of writ

== Result ==
1950 Wollondilly by-election Monday 23 January
Party	Candidate	Votes	%	±%
Liberal	Blake Pelly	unopposed		
Liberal hold				

== See also ==
- Electoral results for the district of Wollondilly
- List of New South Wales state by-elections
