= 1915 Wollondilly state by-election =

Election result for Wollondilly, New South Wales, Australia

A by-election was held for the New South Wales Legislative Assembly electorate of Wollondilly on 16 September 1915 following the death of Frank Badgery (Liberal Reform).

== Dates ==
Date	Event
28 August 1915	Frank Badgery died
9 September 1915	Writ of election issued by the Speaker of the Legislative Assembly.
16 September 1915	Nominations
2 October 1915	Polling day
14 October 1915	Return of writ

== Result ==
1915 Wollondilly by-election Thursday 16 September
Party	Candidate	Votes	%	±%
Liberal Reform	George Fuller	unopposed		
Liberal Reform hold				

== See also ==
- Electoral results for the district of Wollondilly
- List of New South Wales state by-elections
