= 1928 Wollondilly state by-election =

Election result for Wollondilly, New South Wales, Australia

A by-election was held for the New South Wales Legislative Assembly electorate of Wollondilly on 3 March 1928 because of the resignation of Sir George Fuller (Nationalist) who had accepted the position of Agent-General in London.

== Dates ==
Date	Event
7 February 1928	Sir George Fuller resigned.
10 February 1928	Writ of election issued by the Speaker of the Legislative Assembly.
17 February 1928	Nominations
3 March 1928	Polling day
16 March 1928	Return of writ

== Result ==
1928 Wollondilly by-election Saturday 3 March
Party	Candidate	Votes	%	±%
Nationalist	Mark Morton	5,773	61.1	−1.4
Labor	Daniel Chalker	3,681	38.9	+1.4
Total formal votes		9,454	99.5	+0.6
Informal votes		43	0.5	−0.6
Turnout		9,497	65.6	−16.2
Nationalist hold		Swing	−1.4	

== See also ==
- Electoral results for the district of Wollondilly
- List of New South Wales state by-elections
