= 1938 Wollondilly state by-election =

Election result for Wollondilly, New South Wales, Australia

A by-election was held for the New South Wales Legislative Assembly electorate of Wollondilly on 12 November 1938 because of the death of Mark Morton (United Australia).

== Dates ==
Date	Event
28 September 1938	Mark Morton died.
17 October 1938	Writ of election issued by the Speaker of the Legislative Assembly.
24 October 1938	Nominations
12 November 1938	Polling day
25 November 1938	Return of writ

== Result ==
1938 Wollondilly by-election Saturday 12 November
Party	Candidate	Votes	%	±%
United Australia	Jeff Bate	2,255	19.0	
Independent	Thomas Gilmore	2,326	19.6	
Independent	Tom Mack	1,918	16.2	
United Australia	Henry Morton	1,509	12.7	
United Australia	Peter Loughlin	1,379	11.6	
United Australia	Herbert Venables	1,312	11.1	
United Australia	William Pickles	603	5.1	
Ind. United Australia	Walter Moss	503	4.2	
Independent	James Graham	56	0.5	
Total formal votes		11,861	93.7	
Informal votes		804	6.4	
Turnout		12,665	89.8	
Two-party-preferred result
United Australia	Jeff Bate	6,821	57.5	
Independent	Thomas Gilmore	5,040	42.5	
United Australia hold		Swing	N/A	

== See also ==
- Electoral results for the district of Wollondilly
- List of New South Wales state by-elections
