= 1913 Wollondilly state by-election =

Election result for Wollondilly, New South Wales, Australia

A by-election was held for the New South Wales Legislative Assembly electorate of Wollondilly on 19 July 1913, following the death of William McCourt (Liberal Reform).

== Dates ==
Date	Event
22 June 1913	William McCourt died.
27 June 1913	Writ of election issued by the Speaker of the Legislative Assembly.
4 July 1913	Day of nomination
19 July 1913	Polling day
8 August 1913	Return of writ

== Result ==
1913 Wollondilly by-election Saturday 19 July
Party	Candidate	Votes	%	±%
Liberal Reform	Frank Badgery	2,724	60.3	−4.7
Labour	John Masters	1,765	39.1	+4.1
Independent	John Pearson	29	0.6	
Total formal votes		4,518	99.2	+1.3
Informal votes		147	0.8	−1.3
Turnout		4,553	55.2 (Note: estimate based on an electoral roll of 7,826 at the 1910 election.)	−12.8
Liberal Reform hold		Swing	−4.7	

== See also ==
- Electoral results for the district of Wollondilly
- List of New South Wales state by-elections
