= Electoral results for the district of Allowrie =

Election results for Allowrie, New South Wales, Australia

Allowrie, an electoral district of the Legislative Assembly in the Australian state of New South Wales, was created in 1904 and abolished in 1920. The only member for Allowrie was Mark Morton.

Election	Member	Party
1904	Mark Morton	Liberal Reform
1907	Mark Morton	Liberal Reform
1910	Mark Morton	Liberal Reform
1913	Mark Morton	Liberal Reform
1917	Mark Morton	Nationalist

== Election results ==
=== Elections in the 1910s ===
==== 1917 ====
1917 New South Wales state election: Allowrie
Party	Candidate	Votes	%	±%
Nationalist	Mark Morton	4,562	61.9	0.0
Labor	William Gibbs	2,802	38.1	0.0
Total formal votes		7,364	99.2	+1.2
Informal votes		57	0.8	−1.2
Turnout		7,421	68.6	−7.1
Nationalist hold		Swing	0.0	

Sitting MP Mark Morton was returned with a slightly increased majority. The Liberal Reform Party merged into the Nationalist Party prior to the election.

==== 1913 ====
1913 New South Wales state election: Allowrie
Party	Candidate	Votes	%	±%
Liberal Reform	Mark Morton	4,981	61.9	
Labor	Charles Craig	3,069	38.1	
Total formal votes		8,050	98.0	
Informal votes		161	2.0	
Turnout		8,211	75.7	
Liberal Reform hold				

Sitting Liberal Reform MP Mark Morton was returned with a reduced majority defeating Labor's Charles Craig for a second time.

=== Elections in the 1900s ===
==== 1910 ====
1910 New South Wales state election: Allowrie
Party	Candidate	Votes	%	±%
Liberal Reform	Mark Morton	3,298	64.4	
Labour	Charles Craig	1,825	35.6	
Total formal votes		5,123	97.4	
Informal votes		135	2.6	
Turnout		5,258	75.0	
Liberal Reform hold				

Sitting Liberal Reform MP Mark Morton was returned with an increased majority on his 1904 electoral win.

==== 1907 ====
1907 New South Wales state election: Allowrie
Party	Candidate	Votes	%	±%
Liberal Reform	Mark Morton	Unopposed		
Liberal Reform hold				

==== 1904 ====
1904 New South Wales state election: Allowrie
Party	Candidate	Votes	%	±%
Liberal Reform	Mark Morton	3,594	60.0	
Progressive	Alexander Campbell	2,395	40.0	
Total formal votes		5,989	99.5	
Informal votes		29	0.5	
Turnout		6,018	73.2	
Liberal Reform win		(new seat)		

Allowrie was a new seat comprising the abolished seat of Kiama as well as parts of The Shoalhaven and Illawarra. Mark Morton was the member for The Shoalhaven while Alexander Campbell was the member for Kiama. The member for Illawarra was Edward Allen (Liberal Reform) who unsuccessfully contested Wollongong.
