= 1957 Wollondilly state by-election =

Election result for Wollondilly, New South Wales, Australia

A by-election was held for the New South Wales Legislative Assembly electorate of Wollondilly on 26 October 1957. The election was triggered by the resignation of Blake Pelly (Liberal).

== Dates ==
Date	Event
19 September 1957	Blake Pelly resigned.
1 October 1957	Writ of election issued by the Speaker of the Legislative Assembly.
8 October 1957	Nominations
24 October 1957	Polling day
25 November 1957	Return of writ

== Candidates ==
- Tom Lewis (Liberal) was a lieutenant in the Australian Imperial Force and then the manager of a chicken farm at Castlereagh.
- Ern Seager (Labor) was the Labor candidate at the 1956 and 1959 elections. He was unsuccessful on each occasion.
- Murrum Sweet was a former president of Wollondilly Shire. This was the only occasion in which he stood for election in New South Wales.

== Result ==
1957 Wollondilly by-election Saturday 24 October
Party	Candidate	Votes	%	±%
Liberal	Tom Lewis	8,483	52.0	
Labor	Ern Seager	5,155	31.6	
Independent	Murrum Sweet	2,666	16.4	
Total formal votes		16,304	98.6	
Informal votes		236	1.4	
Turnout		16,540	86.2	
Liberal hold		Swing		

== See also ==
- Electoral results for the district of Wollondilly
- List of New South Wales state by-elections
