= 60 Squadron =

60 Squadron or 60th Squadron may refer to:

Aviation squadrons

- No. 60 Squadron RAF, a unit of the Royal Air Force
- No. 60 Squadron RAAF, a unit of the Royal Australian Air Force
- 60 Squadron SAAF, a unit of the South African Air Force
