= John Cleary (New South Wales politician) =

Australian politician (1883–1962)

John Joseph Cleary (29 April 1883 – 2 October 1962) was an Australian politician.

== Life and career ==
Cleary was born at Pitt Town to farmer Thomas Cleary and Mary Ann, née Mackey, who were both Irish-born. He received a primary education but by the age of fourteen was working as a goldminer at Wyalong, then as a smelter with Duncanand Moyes, before returning to mining at Junee. After a two-year stint farming near Warra in Queensland, he settled in Forbes, where he was assistant town clerk (1908–15), an alderman (1912–15), and town clerk (1915–26). On 3 January 1906 he had married Alice Mary Brown, with whom he had nine children. In 1920 he was elected to the New South Wales Legislative Assembly as a Labor member for Wollondilly, but he was defeated in 1922. From 1923 to 1926 he edited the Picton Post and worked as an estate agent until in 1926 he became proprietor of Bargo Hotel. In 1928 he became proprietor of the United States Hotel in Sussex Street, Sydney, and he was also town clerk at Molong from 1928 until his dismissal in 1932. Thereafter he worked for the Defence Department until 1945, when he retired. Cleary died at Canterbury in 1962.

New South Wales Legislative Assembly
Preceded by Sir George Fuller	Member for Wollondilly; 1920–1922; Served alongside: Billy Davies, Sir George Fuller	Succeeded by Mark Morton
