= Electoral district of Allowrie =

Former electoral district of New South Wales, Australia

Allowrie New South Wales—Legislative Assembly
- State: New South Wales
- Created: 1904
- Abolished: 1920
- Namesake: Aboriginal term

Allowrie was an electoral district of the Legislative Assembly in the Australian state of New South Wales first created in 1904 and replacing Shoalhaven and part of Moruya. Its name appears to be Aboriginal, meaning "pleasant place near the sea" or "high place near the sea" and may be the source of the name Illawarra. In 1920, with the introduction of proportional representation, it was absorbed into Wollondilly, along with Wollongong.

== Members for Allowrie ==
The seat's inaugural election in 1904 was won by Mark Morton who was the sitting Liberal Reform MP for Shoalhaven. He defeated the sitting Progressive MP for Kiama, Alexander Campbell. Morton went to win the next four elections. He won unopposed in 1907 and defeated Labor's Charles William Craig twice 1910 and 1913. Prior the 1917 election, Morton became a member of the newly formed Nationalist Party and was returned with a slightly increased majority. The seat was abolished in 1920 and Morton went on to serve as the member for Wollondilly.

Member	Party	Term
Mark Morton	Liberal Reform	1904–1917
Mark Morton	Nationalist	1917–1920

== See also ==
- Electoral results for the district of Allowrie
