= No. 60 Squadron RAAF =

Royal Australian Air Force squadron

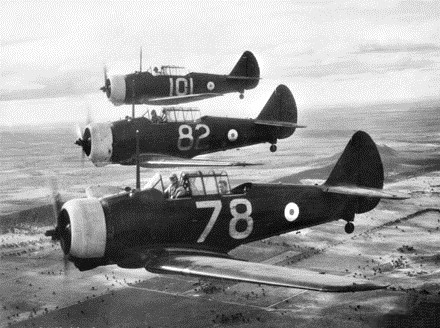
- Wirraway aircraft near Wagga Wagga in July 1941. The aircraft closest to the camera is being piloted by Blake Pelly, who later commanded No. 60 Squadron.
- Active: January–April 1942
- Country: Australia
- Branch: Royal Australian Air Force

Commanders
- Notable commanders: Blake Pelly

Insignia
- Squadron code: EY

Aircraft flown
- Trainer: CAC Wirraway

No. 60 Squadron was a Royal Australian Air Force fighter squadron of World War II. It was formed in January 1942 and disbanded three months later, without seeing combat.

== Squadron history ==
No. 60 Squadron was formed at Wagga Wagga, New South Wales, on 1 January 1942 as part of Australia's response to the rapid Japanese advance during the first month of the Pacific War and the perceived threat of invasion. It comprised 179 personnel and three flights of CAC Wirraway aircraft drawn from No. 2 Service Flying Training School. These aircraft were armed with two forward-firing machine guns and a further machine gun in the rear cockpit and could carry four 250-lb or two 500-lb bombs.

The squadron began training on 6 January. It practiced formation flying, dive bombing and air-to-ground gunnery as well as conducting air defence exercises with other units based at Wagga Wagga. On 2 February No. 60 Squadron moved to Cootamundra but remained under the operational command of Wagga Wagga's operations room. From 3 to 5 February the squadron exercised with another squadron based at Wagga Wagga. It did not conduct any flight training after 6 February, but continued ground training.

No. 60 Squadron was disbanded on 3 April 1942 as its aircraft and personnel were needed by the RAAF's training units. The squadron's aircraft and other equipment were transferred to RAAF units at Uranquinty and its personnel posted to units at Uranquinty and Deniliquin. The squadron's commander throughout its existence, Blake Pelly, was promoted to the rank of acting group captain in 1944 and represented the Electoral district of Wollondilly in the New South Wales Legislative Assembly between 1950 and 1957.
