= Judy Hannan =

Australian politician

Judy Hannan MP

Member of the New South Wales Legislative Assembly for Wollondilly
- Incumbent
- Assumed office 25 March 2023
- Preceded by: Nathaniel Smith

Mayor of Wollondilly
- In office 26 September 2016 – 17 December 2018
- Preceded by: Simon Landow
- Succeeded by: Matthew Deeth
- In office 16 April 2007 – 13 September 2008
- Preceded by: Phil Costa
- Succeeded by: Michael Banasik

Councillor of Wollondilly Shire for North Ward
- In office 27 March 2004 – 14 September 2024

Personal details
- Born: Judy Irvine
- Party: Independent
- Other political affiliations: Liberal (2000s)
- Occupation: Optometrist

Judith Anne Hannan (née Irvine) is an Australian politician. She was elected a member of the New South Wales Legislative Assembly representing Wollondilly as an Independent in 2023.

== Political career ==
She was the unsuccessful Liberal candidate in the 2001 Auburn state by-election. She then unsuccessfully contested Granville at the 2003 New South Wales state election.

In 2004, she ran for Wollondilly Shire in North Ward.

In the 2011 New South Wales state election, Hannan contested Wollondilly for the Hatton's Independent Team but came in third place.

Prior to the 2019 New South Wales state election, she had been courted as a possible Liberal candidate by then-Premier Gladys Berejiklian. Nathaniel Smith was selected as the Liberal candidate for Wollondilly instead. Hannan ran as an independent against Smith, achieving 44.5% of the two-party preferred vote. In the 2023 election, she ran again as an independent and was supported by the teal-aligned Climate 200.
