= Liza Butler =

Australian politician

Liza Butler MP

Member of the New South Wales Legislative Assembly for South Coast
- Incumbent
- Assumed office 25 March 2023
- Preceded by: Shelley Hancock

Councillor of the City of Shoalhaven for Ward 3
- In office 4 December 2021 – 1 June 2023
- Succeeded by: Gillian Boyd

Personal details
- Party: Labor Party

Liza Anne Butler is an Australian politician. She was elected a member of the New South Wales Legislative Assembly representing South Coast for the Labor Party in 2023.

== Career ==
Butler is the daughter of two primary school teachers.

Prior to starting her own business, Butler worked for the Department of Ageing, Disability & Homecare and then for Centrelink.

Butler was elected to Shoalhaven City Council in 2021. On 25 March 2023, she was elected as the Member for South Coast in the NSW Legislative Assembly. Following Butler's election to NSW Parliament and subsequent resignation as a Shoalhaven City Councillor, a count back of the December 2021 Local Government Ward 3 Shoalhaven City Council election was conducted by the Electoral Commission. Councillor Gillian Boyd was declared elected as the new Ward 3 representative by the Returning Officer.
