= Jai Rowell =

Australian politician

The Honourable Jai Rowell
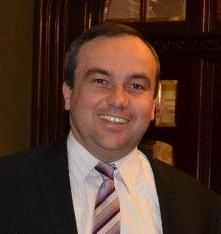

Minister for Mental Health
- In office 23 April 2014 – 2 April 2015
- Premier: Mike Baird
- Preceded by: Kevin Humphries
- Succeeded by: Pru Goward

Assistant Minister for Health
- In office 23 April 2014 – 2 April 2015
- Premier: Mike Baird
- Preceded by: vacant
- Succeeded by: Pru Goward

Member of the New South Wales Parliament for Wollondilly
- In office 26 March 2011 – 17 December 2018
- Preceded by: Phil Costa
- Succeeded by: Nathaniel Smith

Personal details
- Born: 2 January 1977 (age 49)

Jai Travers Rowell (born 2 January 1977), an Australian former politician, was a member of the New South Wales Legislative Assembly representing Wollondilly for the Liberal Party from 2011 to 2018. In April 2014, Rowell was appointed as Minister for Mental Health and Assistant Minister for Health during the Cabinet reshuffle under Premier Mike Baird. Under Gladys Berejiklian as Premier, Rowell was appointed as Special Adviser to the Premier and the NSW Government on Science, Industry and Innovation, a first of its kind. Rowell was the first Liberal Indigenous member of the NSW Legislative Assembly. Rowell has been appointed by Western Sydney University as a Fellow of Law.

== Early career and background ==
After completing a law degree at the University of Western Sydney he held various parliamentary positions including being an electorate officer and later an adviser in the Howard Government. Rowell has worked in both the state and federal parliaments. Rowell was the first Liberal Indigenous member of the NSW Legislative Assembly for the Liberal Party and was the first Indigenous Local Councillor elected to Campbelltown City Council.

Rowell grew up in South West Sydney including the Macarthur and Southern Highlands areas.

He is the father of three boys and is married to Belinda.

== Political career ==
On 29 October 2009, Rowell was pre-selected by the Liberal Party as their candidate in Wollondilly for the 2011 state election. During his campaign for election, Angry Anderson actively supported Rowell; who was elected with a swing of 18.6 points and won the seat with 64.7 per cent of the two-party vote. Rowell won every booth in the electorate. His main opponent was the incumbent sitting member and Minister for Water, Phil Costa, representing Labor. In 2015 Rowell recontested the seat and increased his primary vote from 49.9% to 58% and increased his two party preferred vote to 67.3%. Rowell again achieved a win at every single booth.

Rowell was appointed as deputy government whip on 13 August 2013. Mr Rowell was further promoted to government whip on 25 February 2014. Due to the resignation of Barry O'Farrell as Premier, and the subsequent ministerial reshuffle by Mike Baird, the new Liberal Leader, Rowell was appointed as Minister for Mental Health and Assistant Minister for Health and appointed as a member of Cabinet. Under new Premier Gladys Berejiklian, whom Rowell is close to, Rowell was appointed as Special Adviser to the Premier and the NSW Government on Science, Industry and Innovation, a first of its kind. He was also the Chair of the Legislative Committee on Environment and Planning and Deputy Chair of the Legislative Committee on Law and Safety and Chair of the Committee on Parliamentary Privileges and Ethics.

In February 2018, Rowell announced he would not re-contest the 2019 election, and he resigned as Member for Wollondilly on 17 December 2018.

New South Wales Legislative Assembly
Preceded by Phil Costa	Member for Wollondilly; 2011–2018	Succeeded by Nathaniel Smith
Political offices
Preceded by Kevin Humphries as Minister for Healthy Lifestyles and Mental Health	Minister for Mental Health; 2014–2015	Succeeded by Pru Goward
Preceded by vacant	Assistant Minister for Health; 2014–2015	Succeeded by Pru Goward
