= Phil Costa =

Australian politician

The Honourable Phil Costa

Minister for Water
- In office 8 September 2008 – 28 March 2011
- Premier: Nathan Rees; Kristina Keneally
- Preceded by: Nathan Rees
- Succeeded by: Kevin Humphries
- Constituency: Wollondilly

Minister for Corrective Services
- In office 8 December 2009 – 28 March 2011
- Premier: Kristina Keneally
- Preceded by: John Robertson
- Succeeded by: David Elliott

Minister for Regional Development
- In office 8 September 2008 – 4 December 2009
- Premier: Nathan Rees
- Preceded by: Tony Kelly
- Succeeded by: Ian Macdonald

Minister for Rural Affairs
- In office 8 September 2008 – 8 December 2009
- Premier: Nathan Rees
- Preceded by: Tony Kelly
- Succeeded by: Tony Kelly

21st Mayor of Wollondilly
- In office 19 September 2005 – 16 April 2007
- Deputy: Judith Hannan
- Preceded by: Michael Banasik
- Succeeded by: Judith Hannan

Councillor of the Wollondilly Shire Council for A Ward
- In office September 1985 – 13 September 2008

Personal details
- Born: 24 July 1949 (age 77) Guildford, New South Wales
- Party: Labor Party
- Profession: School principal

Phillip John Costa (born 24 July 1949) is an Australian politician. He was a Labor Party member of the New South Wales Legislative Assembly from 2007 until 2011, representing the electorate of Wollondilly. He served as Minister for Water and Minister for Corrective Services.

== Early life ==
Costa was born on 24 July 1949 at Guildford, New South Wales. Prior to his election he was a primary school teacher and principal of public schools in the Oaks and Buxton. He was named the Citizen of the Year in Wollondilly Shire in 1984.

== Politics ==
Costa was first elected to Wollondilly Shire Council in 1985; he continued serving on the council until 2008. He served as Deputy Mayor from 1999 to 2005 before being elected as Mayor from 2006 to 2007, immediately prior to the 2007 state election.

=== Relationship with Wollondilly Council ===
Costa was elected Mayor of Wollondilly in 2007, standing as an independent candidate. His decision to join the Labor Party was opposed by other councillors who called on him to resign the mayoralty. Council subsequently passed a motion limiting the mayor's powers. Numerous Wollondilly councillors also expressed opposition to Costa's 2008 support for a new commuter car park at Macarthur Railway Station, and for a 2009 proposal for an AGL power station near Appin.

=== Parliament (2007-2011) ===
Costa initially planned to stand as an independent candidate in the 2007 state election but was persuaded by Premier Morris Iemma to stand instead for the Labor Party. He was elected to the Legislative Assembly on 24 March 2007 with 53% of the vote. From June 2007 to September 2008, he was a member of the State Parliament's Standing Committee on Parliamentary Privilege and Ethics and Chair of the Standing Committee on Broadband in Rural and Regional Communities.

From 8 September 2008 to 4 December 2009, he was appointed Minister for Water, Minister for Rural Affairs and Minister for Regional Development in the Cabinet of incoming Premier Nathan Rees.

=== Post-2011 ===
In 2011 he lost Wollondilly to Liberal Jai Rowell as part of an anti-Labor landslide in that year. Later moving to the NSW North Coast, Costa was the unsuccessful Labor candidate for the Federal seat of Lyne in the 2019 election.

== Personal life ==
Costa is married with two adult children. He is not related to Parliamentary colleague and former Treasurer Michael Costa.

Civic offices
Preceded by	Deputy Mayor of Wollondilly; 1999–2005	Succeeded by Judith Hannan
Preceded by Michael Banasik	Mayor of Wollondilly; 2005–2007	Succeeded by Judith Hannan
New South Wales Legislative Assembly
New district	Member for Wollondilly; 2007–2011	Succeeded by Jai Rowell
Political offices
Preceded by Nathan Rees	Minister for Water; 2008–2011	Vacant Title next held by Kevin Humphries as Minister for Natural Resources, Lands and Water
Preceded by Tony Kelly	Minister for Rural Affairs; 2008–2009	Succeeded by Tony Kelly
Preceded by Tony Kelly	Minister for Regional Development; 2008–2009	Succeeded by Ian Macdonald
Preceded by John Robertson	Minister for Corrective Services; 2009–2011	Vacant Title next held by David Elliott
