= Jack Beale =

Australian politician

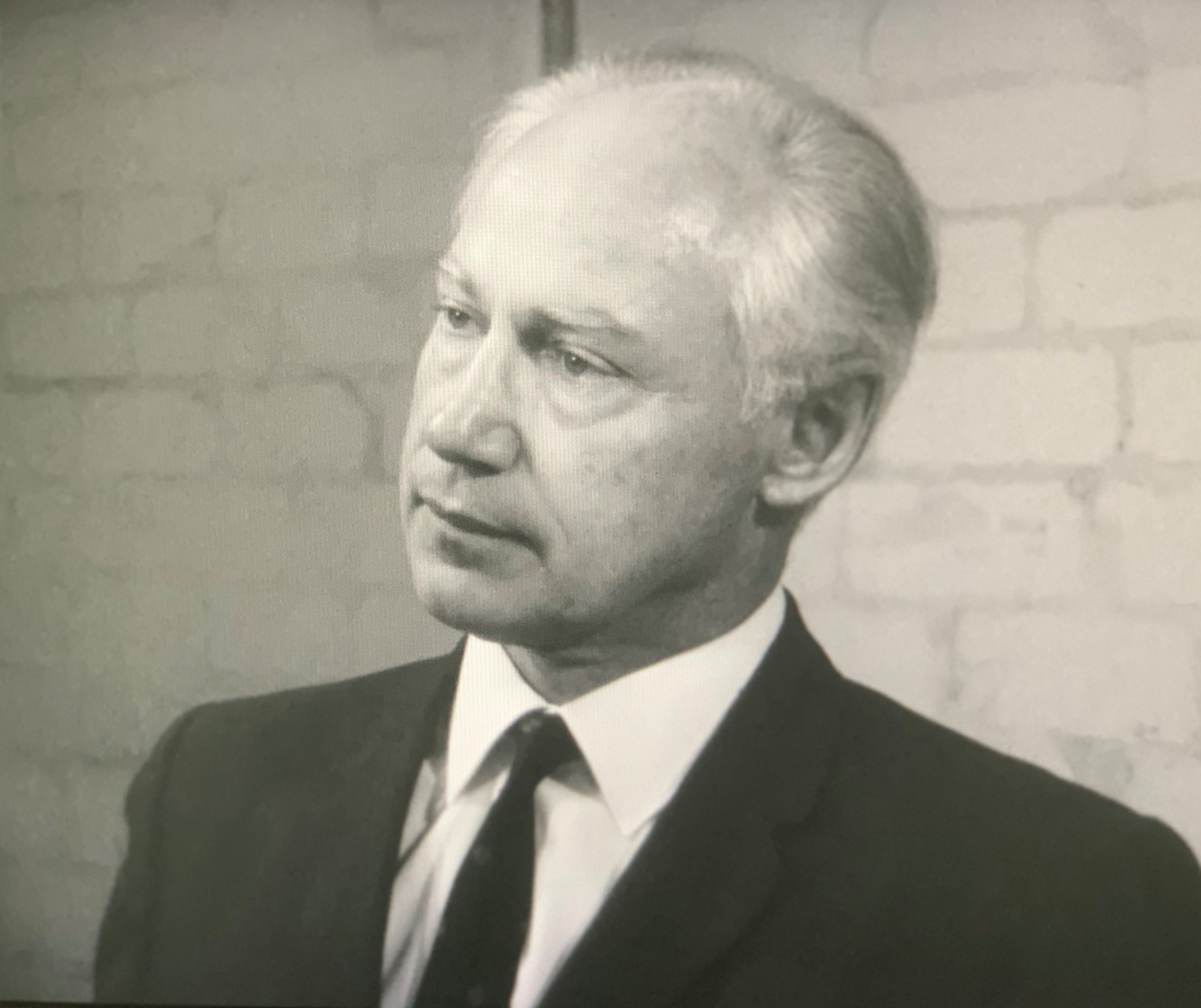

Jack Gordon Beale AO (17 July 1917 – 7 June 2006) was an Australian politician who championed the need for Australia to conserve and develop its water resources. He was also Australia's first environment minister. In his obituary in The Sydney Morning Herald, he was described as "a visionary, one of the first to realize what would become vital issues in Australia: the potential of water resources and the limited capacity of the environment to sustain abuse." Known as the 'Water Man,' he was quoted as saying:

"Australia is the lowest, flattest, hottest and driest continent on the earth and we have to manage it accordingly."

Most of Australia's rivers flow relatively short distances to the sea. As early as 1963, Jack Beale called for water from Australia's rivers to be diverted to the arid inland.

== Early life and education ==
Jack Beale was born in Manly, a suburb of Sydney, on 17 July 1917, the second child of Rupert Noel Beale, a stock and station agent whose business failed in a drought. His mother was Esther Anderina Green from New Zealand. He attended state schools in rural Scone and the industrial city of Newcastle, and earned an honors diploma in mechanical engineering from Sydney Technical College. He joined the New South Wales Department of Public Works in 1936, where he saw the irrigation and energy potential of the state's rivers and developed a passion which was to last a lifetime for water conservation and irrigation. At age 48 he earned a Masters of Engineering degree from the University of New South Wales with a thesis on water irrigation efficiency.

== Political career ==
Jack Beale's father Rupert was elected a Member of the Legislative Assembly in the New South Wales state parliament in 1941. After Rupert Beale's death in 1942, Jack Beale ran in the by-election for his father's electorate, South Coast, winning as an independent and becoming at the age of 25 the youngest member of the NSW parliament. He served in parliament for 31 years and won three elections as an independent and 8 as a member of the Liberal Party. He was an independent or in opposition for 22 consecutive years of his parliamentary career, and was a cabinet minister in the Askin government for the last nine 9 years. When Askin became Premier in 1965, he offered Jack Beale the Minister for Public Works portfolio, which ranked fifth in state protocol. He declined the position and asked for the portfolio of Minister for Conservation, which ranked thirteenth, but which was responsible for the state's water, soil and forests and which interested him more. He embarked on a program to develop the state's water resources, initiating comprehensive river valley surveys and an infrastructure program constructing new dams and weirs. While his primary motivation was to support farmers, he also directed water releases from state dams to preserve the ecology of the Macquarie Marshes Nature Reserve.

1n 1971 he became NSW Minister for Environmental Control and was Australia's first environment minister. He established the state's Pollution Control Commission, which later became the Environmental Protection Authority. Making issues such as the water quality of Sydney Harbour a priority, he sponsored early legislation relating to clean air, clean water, air pollution control and waste disposal.

He was also Minister assisting the Premier and Treasurer and participated in negotiations with the federal government on revenue sharing. After falling out with Askin, he resigned from parliament in October 1973, one month before a state election. The Liberal Party lost the seat.

== Post–political career ==
=== In business ===
After working as a cadet engineer at the NSW Public Works department, Jack Beale worked as an engineer at Shell Australia and later as a consulting engineer. An energetic man who found life as a parliamentary backbencher too quiet, he started during his parliamentary career over 20 small businesses, including Springs Pty. Ltd. which manufactured springs and paperclips and Rain Spray Sprinklers Pty. Ltd. which manufactured irrigation equipment. He also served as non-executive chairman of Talcott Factors Limited, a listed finance company. When he became a cabinet minister he was forced to give up his business interests but after leaving politics he plunged back into his irrigation business, which he later sold it to James Hardie Limited.

He also initiated the private power industry in New South Wales. Starting in 1987, in his 70s, he proposed first to the Unsworth and then the Greiner governments that he develop privately owned and operated hydroelectric power stations at 13 state dams. After fighting bureaucratic opposition and the entrenched interest of the monopoly Electricity Commission, he eventually won a public tender to establish power stations at three dams, Burrendong, Copeton and Glenbawn (near Scone where he had lived as a child). He produced his first electricity in 1995 when he was 78.

=== In non–profit activities ===
In 1955, Jack Beale founded the Water Research Foundation of Australia to fund research into the development and control of Australia's water resources, and was its chairman for 30 years. From 1974 to 1977 he was an adviser to the United Nations Environment Program (UNEP) and undertook advisory missions to Thailand, Venezuela, the Philippines and Sri Lanka. He was a delegate to the Water for Peace Conference in Washington in 1967 and to the United Nations Conference on the Human Environment in Stockholm in 1972.

== Honours ==
Jack Beale was awarded an Officer of the Order of Australia (AO) in 1999, and the Centenary Medal in 2001. He received an Honorary Doctor of Laws degree from the Australian National University and an Honorary Doctor of Science degree from the University of New South Wales. The Australian National University established a Jack Beale Chair of Water Resources and the University of New South Wales established an annual Jack Beale Lecture on the Global Environment.

== Family ==
Jack Beale had two siblings: Peggy Willoughby Beale, who married Lloyd Miller of Gerringong, NSW, and William Sugden Beale, who married Judith Edgell of Cowra, NSW.

Jack Beale married (1) Pamela June Anne Wallis, daughter of David Lindsay Wallis and Ella Gwendoline Holbrook, in 1942 and (2) Stephania Toth-Dobranski, a Polish immigrant to Australia, in 1965.

He had two sons with Pamela Wallis, David John Beale, an engineer, and Christopher William Beale, who led the banking industry in the development of the Equator Principles, a process for handling environmental risk in development projects.

Jack Beale died in the Sydney suburb of Elizabeth Bay in 2006 at the age of 89.

Parliament of New South Wales
Political offices
| Preceded by George Enticknap | Minister for Conservation; 1965 – 1971 | Succeeded by Wal Fife |
| New office | Minister for Environmental Control; 1971 – 1973 | Succeeded by Sir John Fuller as Minister for Planning and Environment |
New South Wales Legislative Assembly
| Preceded by Rupert Beale | Member for South Coast; 1942 – 1973 | Succeeded by John Hatton |
