= Nathaniel Smith (Australian politician) =

Australian politician

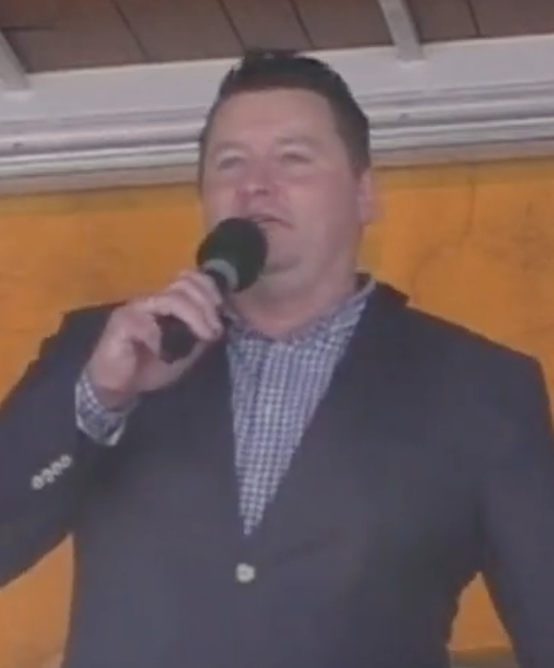

Member of the New South Wales Parliament for Wollondilly
- In office 23 March 2019 – 25 March 2023
- Preceded by: Jai Rowell
- Succeeded by: Judy Hannan

Personal details
- Born: 1980 (age 45–46)
- Party: Liberal (until 2026)
- Relations: Greg Smith (father)
- Occupation: Plumber

Nathaniel Gerard Smith (born 1980) is an Australian politician. He was a member of the New South Wales Legislative Assembly from 2019 to 2023, representing Wollondilly for the Liberal Party. Smith was defeated by independent Judy Hannan in the 2023 New South Wales state election.

== Pre-political career ==
Smith, the son of former NSW Attorney General Greg Smith, trained as a plumber and has completed a master's degree in Organisational Communications.

== Political career ==
Smith was elected as a member of the New South Wales Legislative Assembly from 2019 to 2023, representing Wollondilly for the Liberal Party. He was defeated by independent Judy Hannan at the 2023 New South Wales state election.

Smith supports the privatisation of Sydney Water and other assets.

Smith attended Dominic Perrottet's infamous 21st birthday party where Perrottet wore a Nazi uniform.

At a 2019 anti-abortion rally, Smith said abortion should not be decriminalised. Stating "This will not protect women, this should not be going into the health care act, it should remain in the crimes act".

He has also expressed his views on "political correctness" and the "Marxist brainwashing" of school students.

In 2025, Smith was selected as the Liberal candidate for the Division of Whitlam at the 2025 Australian federal election. The previous candidate, Benjamin Britton, was removed as the candidate after controversial statements concerning the role of women in the ADF he made on podcasts were reported in the press.

Smith resigned from the Liberal Party in 2026.

New South Wales Legislative Assembly
| Preceded by Jai Rowell | Member for Wollondilly; 2019–2023 | Succeeded by Judy Hannan |
