= Wayne Smith (Australian politician) =

Australian politician

Wayne Douglas Smith (born 4 November 1952) was an Australian politician. He was a Labor Party member of the New South Wales Legislative Assembly from 1999 to 2003, representing the electorate of South Coast. He was the only incumbent ALP member to lose his seat at the 2003 state election.

Smith was born in Newcastle and educated at Birrong Boys High School. He received a B.Sc. and a Dip.Ed from the University of Sydney. Smith trained as a teacher, and was working at Vincentia High School when he decided to contest ALP pre-selection for the Liberal-held state seat of South Coast. Though he had a low profile in the community, he ultimately won a narrow victory amidst the backdrop of a major statewide win for the ALP. In parliament, Smith was a relatively low-profile backbencher, and frequently clashed with the Liberal member for the corresponding federal electorate, the popular Joanna Gash. He was challenged by teacher and former Shoalhaven councillor Shelley Hancock at the 2003 election, and while polls initially predicted a Smith victory, Hancock went on to win by more than 1500 votes. Smith has since relocated to Sydney.

New South Wales Legislative Assembly
Preceded by Eric Ellis	Member for South Coast; 1999–2003	Succeeded by Shelley Hancock
