= Eric Ellis (politician) =

Australian politician

Eric James Ellis (born 9 December 1942) is a former Australian politician.

Born in Sydney, New South Wales, he was a pharmaceutical wholesaler on the South Coast before entering politics. Ellis had also represented Australia in ten pin bowling, and had served in the 3rd Battalion of the Royal Australian Regiment Regular Army. In 1990, he joined the Liberal Party.

In 1995, when the sitting independent member for South Coast in the New South Wales Legislative Assembly, John Hatton, retired, Ellis was elected to the seat as the Liberal candidate. He held the seat until 1999, when he was defeated by Labor candidate Wayne Smith.

New South Wales Legislative Assembly
Preceded by John Hatton	Member for South Coast; 1995–1999	Succeeded by Wayne Smith
