= Shelley Hancock =

Australian politician

The Honourable Shelley Hancock OAM
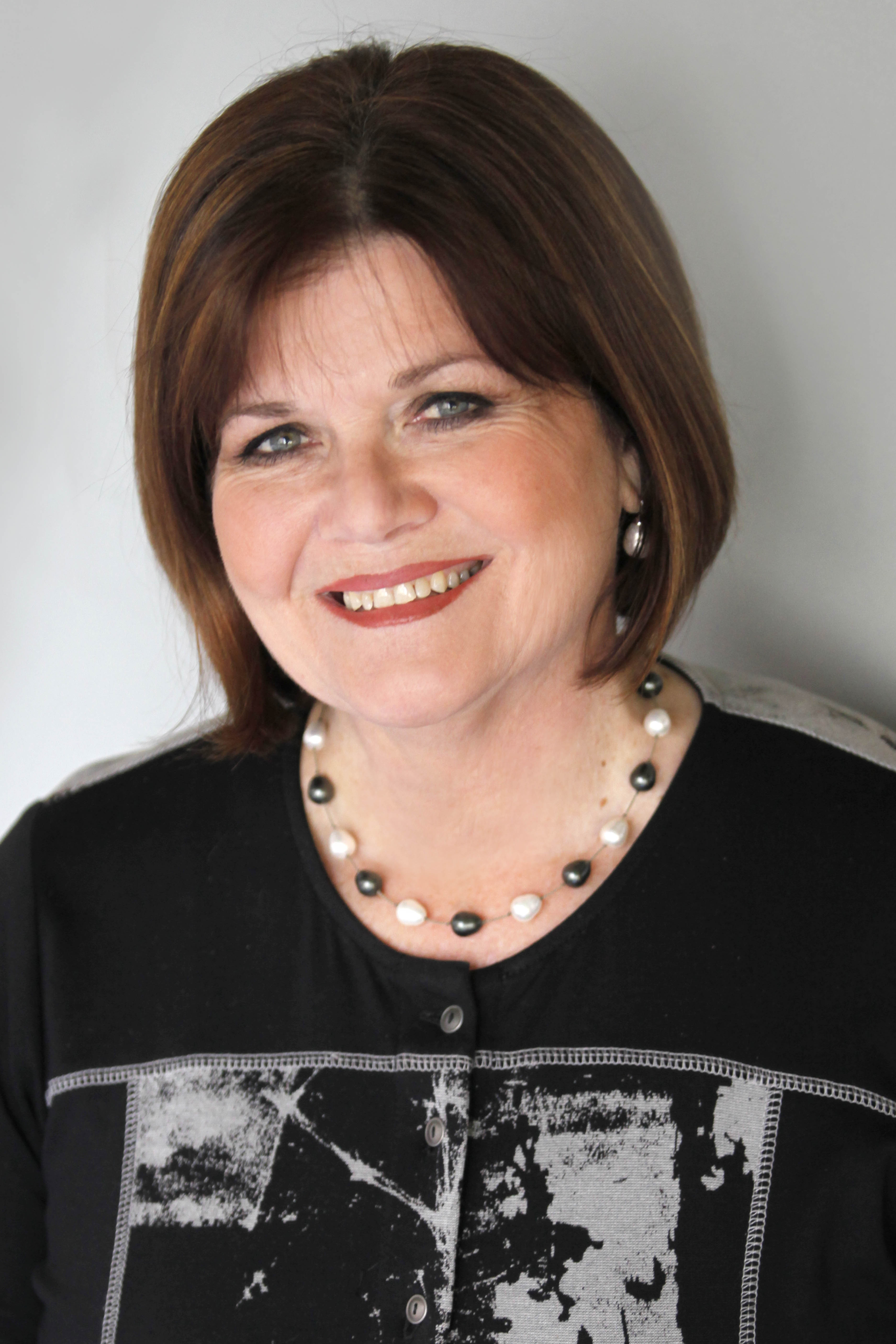

Minister for Local Government
- In office 2 April 2019 – 21 December 2021
- Premier: Gladys Berejiklian; Dominic Perrottet
- Preceded by: Gabrielle Upton
- Succeeded by: Wendy Tuckerman

Member of the New South Wales Parliament for South Coast
- In office 22 March 2003 – 25 March 2023
- Preceded by: Wayne Smith
- Succeeded by: Liza Butler

30th Speaker of the New South Wales Legislative Assembly
- In office 3 May 2011 – 7 May 2019
- Preceded by: Richard Torbay
- Succeeded by: Jonathan O'Dea

Personal details
- Born: 14 November 1951 (age 75) Australia
- Party: Liberal Party
- Education: University of Sydney
- Occupation: Politician
- Profession: Teacher

Shelley Elizabeth Hancock OAM (born 14 November 1951), is an Australian politician. Hancock was the Liberal Member of the Legislative Assembly seat of South Coast from 2003 until 2023.

Hancock previously served as the thirtieth Speaker of the New South Wales Legislative Assembly and was the first woman to hold the role, serving between May 2011 and March 2019. Hancock also served as the Minister for Local Government in the second Berejiklian ministry and the Perrottet ministry between April 2019 and December 2021.

She stood down at the 2023 New South Wales state election.

== Early years and background ==
Hancock grew up in Chatswood and attended primary schools in Chatswood and Artarmon and the North Sydney Girls High School. She completed a Bachelor of Arts at the University of Sydney and was a former joint owner of the H Ranch at Milton and was a high school teacher at Ulladulla for 26 years. Hancock is married to Ossie and they have three children.

Hancock served on Shoalhaven City Council for 17 years as a ward three alderman and councillor, serving on a number of council committees. Hancock was also elected deputy mayor from September 2000 to September 2001.

== Political career ==
Hancock has represented South Coast for the Liberal Party since 2003. She was the only Liberal candidate to win a seat from the governing Labor Party at the 2003 state election with 52.8 per cent of the two-party vote. During her inaugural speech to the New South Wales Legislative Assembly on 28 May 2003, Hancock asserted "motherhood convinced me that mine is the privileged gender".

Prior to the 2007 election, local and metropolitan journalists received phone calls encouraging them to print false allegations that Hancock and her husband had been involved in the making of pornographic films. The source of the phone contact was revealed to be a staff member of the Labor Party candidate Michelle Miran, an employee of the NSW Department of State and Regional Development. The same reports suggested that Labor had unsuccessfully tried to publish the same allegations at the 1991, 1995 and 2003 elections as well. Hancock went on to defeat Michelle Miran achieving a 6.2-point two-party-preferred swing in her favour. At the 2011 general election, Hancock was re-elected to the South Coast with a swing of 11.2 points and won the seat with 70.4 per cent of the two-party vote. Her main opponent was Glenn Sims, representing Labor. Hancock contested the 2015 general election and was re-elected with a swing against her of 10.5 points. Despite the swing, Hancock went on to win the seat with 59.6 per cent of the two-party vote.

=== Speaker of the NSW Legislative Assembly ===
Following the 2011 state election, on 3 May, Hancock was elected unanimously as Speaker of the New South Wales Legislative Assembly, the first female Speaker of New South Wales Parliament. Following the 2015 state election, Hancock was re-elected unanimously to the role on 5 May.

As Speaker, Hancock was responsible for a number of infrastructure and security improvements to the New South Wales Parliamentary Precinct. Most notably, her tenure has overseen historic restorations to elements of the old Rum Hospital Building including the Wentworth Room, which was used as the Legislative Council chamber from 1829 to 1843, as well as the former parliamentary library, the Jubilee Room, built in 1906. Further to the historic restorations, she has overseen improvements to the modern office buildings housing member and parliamentary staff, as well overseeing upgrades to disability access and facilities.

As Speaker, Hancock has sought to address a number of issues on the parliamentary precinct where there was disparity in what was available to women, and what was available to men. She organised a 'loo coup' where, along with a number of other female MPs and ministers, she arranged for the substandard female bathrooms on a lower level of the parliament building to be swapped with the superior male bathroom facilities. This was part of a larger push to make NSW Parliament a fit place for female politicians.

Hancock presided over an incident in the Legislative Assembly where she was forced to call upon the Sergeant-at-arms to remove Michael Daley, a senior Labor Party shadow minister, who was accused of drunken misconduct in the chamber. Daley later apologised to Hancock.

In March 2017, Hancock, launched the 'NSW Parliament: A Fit Place for Women' exhibition which showcased the expanding role of women in NSW politics throughout its history. The exhibition was particularly well timed with the first female Liberal premier of New South Wales, Gladys Berejiklian, coming to power in January of the same year.

=== Minister for Local Government ===
Following the 2019 state election Hancock was sworn in as the minister for local government in the second Berejiklian ministry, with effect from 2 April 2019; and served in the first arrangement of the Perrottet ministry until she announce her resignation from the Perrottet ministry ahead of the reshuffle, citing difficulty to move past the resignation of the former premier Gladys Berejiklian and the lack of women representation in the Perrottet ministry.

== Honours and recognition ==
Hancock was awarded the Medal of the Order of Australia in the 2024 King's Birthday Honours for "service to the people and Parliament of New South Wales".

New South Wales Legislative Assembly
Preceded by Wayne Smith	Member for South Coast; 2003–present	Incumbent
Political offices
Preceded by Gabrielle Upton	Minister for Local Government; 2019–present	Succeeded by Wendy Tuckerman
New South Wales Legislative Assembly
Preceded by Richard Torbay	Speaker of the New South Wales Legislative Assembly; 2011–2019	Succeeded by Jonathan O'Dea
