= Henry Bate (politician) =

Australian politician

Henry Bate MLA

Personal details
- Born: 19 April 1881 Tilba Tilba, New South Wales
- Died: 4 January 1967 (aged 85) Bega, New South Wales
- Party: Nationalist Party & United Australia Party
- Spouse(s): Lily (née Percival); Elise May (née Mead)
- Relations: Thelma Bate (née Olsen); Zara Bate (née Dickens & Holt)
- Children: Henry Jefferson Percival Bate
- Education: Newington College; Sydney Technical College; Hawkesbury Agricultural College
- Occupation: Farmer

Henry John Bate (19 April 1881 – 4 January 1967) was an Australian politician.

Bate was born at Tilba Tilba, New South Wales, to farmer Richard Mossop Bate and his wife Henrietta (née Higman). He was educated at Newington College (1897–1899) before attending Sydney Technical College and Hawkesbury Agricultural College. Like his father he became a farmer. On 2 May 1905 he married Lily Percival, with whom he had two sons; he would later remarry Elise May Mead on 23 May 1918. In 1910 he was elected to Eurobodalla Shire Council, serving until 1913 and again from 1917 to 1928. In 1926 he was elected to the New South Wales Legislative Assembly as the Nationalist member for Goulburn, transferring to South Coast in 1927. In 1931 he joined the United Australia Party. Bate served until 1941, and died in Bega in 1967. His son, Jeff Bate, and his daughters-in-law, Thelma Bate and Zara Bate add to the political notability of the Bate family.

New South Wales Legislative Assembly
Preceded by John Perkins	Member for Goulburn; 1926–1927; Served alongside: Paddy Stokes, Jack Tully	Succeeded by Jack Tully
New seat	Member for South Coast; 1927–1941	Succeeded by Rupert Beale
