= Electoral district of South Coast =

State electoral district in New South Wales, Australia

South Coast New South Wales—Legislative Assembly
- Interactive map of district boundaries from the 2023 state election
- State: New South Wales
- Dates current: 1927–present
- MP: Liza Butler
- Party: Labor
- Namesake: South Coast Region
- Electors: 56,922 (2019)
- Area: 2,799.02 km^{2} (1,080.7 sq mi)
- Demographic: Provincial and rural
Electorates around South Coast:
Monaro	Kiama	Pacific Ocean
Monaro	South Coast	Jervis Bay Territory
Monaro	Bega	Pacific Ocean

South Coast is an electoral district of the Legislative Assembly in the Australian state of New South Wales. It incorporates almost all of the City of Shoalhaven to the south of the Shoalhaven River, notably Nowra, Ulladulla and Milton.

== Members for South Coast ==
Member	Party	Period
Henry Bate	Nationalist	1927–1932
Henry Bate	United Australia	1932–1941
Rupert Beale	Independent	1941–1942
Jack Beale	Independent	1942–1948
Jack Beale	Liberal	1948–1973
John Hatton	Independent	1973–1995
Eric Ellis	Liberal	1995–1999
Wayne Smith	Labor	1999–2003
Shelley Hancock	Liberal	2003–2023
Liza Butler	Labor	2023–present

== Election results ==
2023 New South Wales state election: South Coast
Party	Candidate	Votes	%	±%
Liberal	Luke Sikora	17,806	34.72	−20.81
Labor	Liza Butler	17,414	33.96	+2.75
Greens	Amanda Findley	8,021	15.64	+2.38
Shooters, Fishers, Farmers	Robert Korten	3,996	7.79	+7.79
Independent	Nina Digiglio	3,284	6.40	+6.40
Sustainable Australia	Deanna Buffier	764	1.49	+1.49
Total formal votes		51,285	96.61	+0.55
Informal votes		1,797	3.39	−0.55
Turnout		53,082	87.56	−1.84
Two-party-preferred result
Labor	Liza Butler	23,068	53.77	+14.32
Liberal	Luke Sikora	19,834	46.23	−14.32
Labor gain from Liberal		Swing	+14.32	
