= Rupert Beale =

Australian politician

Personal details
- Born: 24 December 1889 near Summer Hill, New South Wales
- Died: 28 September 1942 (aged 52) Paddington, New South Wales
- Party: Independent

Rupert Noel Beale (24 December 1889 – 28 September 1942) was an Australian politician and an Independent member of the New South Wales Legislative Assembly for 16 months from May 1941 until his death.

== Early life ==
Beale was born in Summer Hill, New South Wales, and was the son of a builder. He was educated to secondary level and was a qualified carpenter. Between 1910 and 1915, Beale was involved in a large number of enterprises including being an auctioneer, real estate agent and business broker. He was a dairy farmer in Aberdeen, New South Wales, from 1916 until he was bankrupted in 1922. He was not discharged from his bankruptcy until 1940. In the 1920s and 1930s he was a hotel manager in Newcastle, Sydney and the South Coast of New South Wales. He also had a real estate agency in 1934. He lived permanently on the South Coast after 1935. Interested in local government, Beale was elected as an alderman at various times for Aberdeen Municipal Council, now part of Upper Hunter Shire, and the Municipality of Kiama.

== State Parliament ==
Beale had been unsuccessful as an Independent candidate against the Speaker, Daniel Levy, for the Woollahra seat at the 1935 state election. He eventually entered parliament as the Independent member for South Coast after he won the seat at the 1941 state election. This was a surprise result, as South Coast was considered a safe conservative seat. Beale defeated the incumbent United Australia Party (UAP) member Henry Bate, who had been the member since 1927, by 39 votes (0.15%). Bate had been a supporter of Bertram Stevens during the UAP's leadership struggles and consequently received little support from the party after Stevens was deposed and replaced by Alexander Mair.

Beale was a very active member in parliament, particularly supporting South Coast dairy farmers and the ship building industry. He also called for inquiries into police corruption related to illegal gambling and into wastage in the wheat industry.

In September 1942, Beale died suddenly of a heart attack at age 53 after being in parliament for only 16 months. The Premier, William McKell, said that Beale's method of attacking political problems was unorthodox but that no one ever doubted his sincerity and he was untiring in his efforts for his constituents. Beale did not hold parliamentary or ministerial office. His son, Jack Beale, was elected to replace him in the South Coast seat.

New South Wales Legislative Assembly
| Preceded by Henry Bate | Member for South Coast; 1941–1942 | Succeeded by Jack Beale |
