= Electoral district of Wollondilly =

Electoral district in New South Wales, Australia

Wollondilly New South Wales—Legislative Assembly
- Interactive map of district boundaries from the 2023 state election
- State: New South Wales
- Dates current: 1904–1981; 2007–present
- MP: Judy Hannan
- Party: Independent
- Namesake: Wollondilly
- Electors: 59,758 (2023)
- Area: 3,327.48 km^{2} (1,284.7 sq mi)
- Demographic: Outer-metropolitan and rural
Electorates around Wollondilly:
Bathurst	Blue Mountains	Badgerys Creek
Bathurst	Wollondilly	Camden
Goulburn	Goulburn	Campbelltown

Wollondilly is an electoral district of the Legislative Assembly in the Australian state of New South Wales. It is currently represented by independent Judy Hannan, who defeated sitting member Nathaniel Smith at the 2023 New South Wales state election.

== History ==
Wollondilly was first established in 1904, partly replacing Bowral. In 1920, with the introduction of proportional representation, it absorbed Wollongong and Allowrie and elected three members simultaneously. In 1927, it was split into the single-member electorates of Wollondilly, Wollongong and Illawarra. It was abolished in 1981, but was recreated for the 2007 election, partly replacing Southern Highlands.

Wollondilly is one of four electorates in the New South Wales Legislative Assembly to have been held by two Premiers of New South Wales while in office. Both Premiers Tom Lewis and George Fuller held Wollondilly while in office, the other three electorates being Ku-ring-gai, Maroubra and Willoughby.

Wollondilly was recreated for the 2007 state election, covering areas previously belonging to the districts of Campbelltown, Camden and Southern Highlands, the last of which was abolished. It encompassed all of Wollondilly Shire (including Picton, Tahmoor, Bargo, Yanderra, Thirlmere, Buxton, Wilton, Appin, Douglas Park, Menangle, Cawdor, The Oaks, Oakdale, Warragamba and Silverdale) and part of the City of Campbelltown (including Ambarvale, Glen Alpine, some of Bradbury, St Helens Park, Rosemeadow, Gilead, Wedderburn and Menangle Park).

The next redistribution prior to the 2015 state election saw Wollondilly undergo a southward expansion. It gained the towns of Hill Top, Balmoral, Yerrinbool, Colo Vale, Willow Vale, Mittagong and Bowral from the district of Goulburn. At the same time Wollondilly ceded several suburbs at its northern end, losing Ambarvale, Glen Alpine, Bradbury, St Helens Park, Rosemeadow, Gilead, Wedderburn and Menangle Park to the district of Campbelltown and Camden Park to the district of Camden.

== Members for Wollondilly ==
=== First incarnation 1904–1981 ===
1904–1920, 1 member
Member	Party	Term
William McCourt	Liberal Reform	1904–1913
Frank Badgery	Liberal Reform	1913–1915
George Fuller	Liberal Reform	1915–1917
George Fuller	Nationalist	1917–1920

1920–1927, 3 members
Member	Party	Term	Member	Party	Term	Member	Party	Term
Sir George Fuller	Nationalist	1920–1927	Billy Davies	Labor	1920–1927	John Cleary	Labor	1920–1922
Sir George Fuller	Nationalist	1920–1927	Billy Davies	Labor	1920–1927	Mark Morton	Nationalist	1922–1925
Sir George Fuller	Nationalist	1920–1927	Billy Davies	Labor	1920–1927	Andrew Lysaght Jr.	Labor	1925–1927

1927–1981, 1 member
Member	Party	Term
Sir George Fuller	Nationalist	1927–1928
Mark Morton	Nationalist	1928–1932
Mark Morton	United Australia	1932–1938
Jeff Bate	United Australia	1938–1945
Jeff Bate	Liberal	1945–1949
Blake Pelly	Liberal	1950–1957
Tom Lewis	Liberal	1957–1978
Bill Knott	Labor	1978–1981

=== Second incarnation 2007–present ===
2007–present, 1 member
Member	Party	Term
Phil Costa	Labor	2007–2011
Jai Rowell	Liberal	2011–2018
Nathaniel Smith	Liberal	2019–2023
Judy Hannan	Independent	2023–present

== Election results ==
2023 New South Wales state election: Wollondilly
Party	Candidate	Votes	%	±%
Liberal	Nathaniel Smith	17,712	33.8	−4.7
Independent	Judy Hannan	13,586	25.9	+6.1
Labor	Angus Braiden	11,505	22.0	+6.9
One Nation	Rebecca Thompson	6,158	11.8	+0.7
Greens	Jason Webster	2,616	5.0	−0.6
Sustainable Australia	Ildiko Haag	792	1.5	+1.5
Total formal votes		52,369	96.9	+0.4
Informal votes		1,698	3.1	−0.4
Turnout		54,067	90.5	−0.2
Notional two-party-preferred count
Liberal	Nathaniel Smith	22,300	55.0	−9.1
Labor	Angus Braiden	18,212	45.0	+9.1
Two-candidate-preferred result
Independent	Judy Hannan	21,588	51.5	+7.5
Liberal	Nathaniel Smith	20,312	48.5	−7.5
Independent gain from Liberal		Swing	+7.5	
