= Blake Pelly =

Australian politician

Blake Pelly OBE
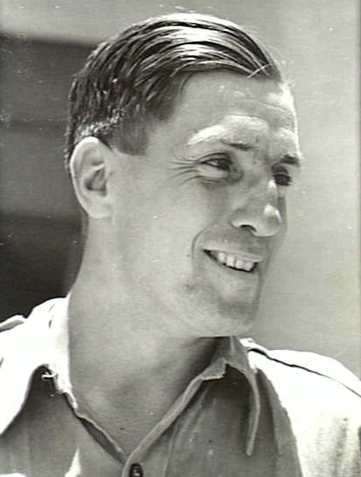
- Blake Pelly in 1941

Member of the New South Wales Legislative Assembly for Wollondilly
- In office 23 January 1950 – 19 September 1957
- Preceded by: Jeff Bate
- Succeeded by: Tom Lewis

Personal details
- Born: 31 May 1907 Buckley, Flintshire, Wales
- Died: 16 October 1990 (aged 83) Sydney, Australia
- Party: Liberal Party
- Education: Emmanuel College, Cambridge

Military service
- Allegiance: Australia
- Branch/service: Royal Australian Air Force
- Years of service: 1937–1946
- Rank: Group Captain
- Commands: No. 451 Squadron RAAF (1941); No. 60 Squadron RAAF (1942); No. 73 Wing RAAF (1943)
- Battles/wars: Second World War
- Awards: Officer of the Order of the British Empire; Mentioned in Despatches

Blake Raymond Pelly, OBE (31 May 1907 – 16 October 1990) was an Australian air force officer, politician, and businessman who represented the Liberal Party in New South Wales Parliament.

Before and during the Second World War Pelly served in the Royal Australian Air Force, rising to the rank of group captain and serving as director of Operations Royal Australian Air Force Headquarters 1945–1946. He was mentioned in despatches on 24 September 1941 and, on 16 June 1944, was appointed an Officer of the Order of the British Empire for distinguished service and efficiency in the south-west Pacific area.

Pelly represented the electoral district of Wollondilly from 1950 to 1957.

After retiring Pelly was chairman of directors of Rio Tinto (Australia) Limited, Hammersley Iron Pty Limited, Zinc Corporation Limited, Merchant Bills Corporation; chairman of directors of Unity Life Assurance Limited from 1959, Sun Alliance Insurance Limited from 1972, deputy chairman of Universities Board in 1967, and a member of Higher Education Board in 1976.

New South Wales Legislative Assembly
Preceded by Jeff Bate	Member for Wollondilly; 1950–1957	Succeeded by Tom Lewis
