= John Hatton (politician) =

Australian politician (born 1933)

John Hatton AO

Member of the New South Wales Legislative Assembly for South Coast
- In office 17 November 1973 – 27 February 1995
- Preceded by: Jack Beale
- Succeeded by: Eric Ellis

Personal details
- Born: John Edward Hatton; 29 May 1933 (age 93) Hammondville, New South Wales, Australia
- Party: Independent

John Edward Hatton AO (born 29 May 1933) is a former Australian politician, and a National Trust of Australia nominated Australian Living Treasure. He was the independent member of the Legislative Assembly of the New South Wales parliament for the seat of South Coast from 1973 to 1995. Notably, the allegations about police corruption which he raised in Parliament resulted in the Wood Royal Commission. He is currently a social activist in his local community.

== Early life and background ==
John Hatton was born in Hammondville, New South Wales, the son of Harry and Florence Hatton. He was educated at Hammondville Public School, Hurlstone Agricultural High School and Armidale Teachers' College.

He was Foundation President and President for 15 years of the Shoalhaven Combined Progress Associations.

Hatton was the Mayor of the New South Wales Shire of Shoalhaven^{a} before his entry into state politics.

== Parliamentary career ==
Hatton was the member for the New South Wales lower house seat of South Coast between 1973 and 1995. A measure of Hatton's local popularity occurred in the 1976 state election where he polled 65% of the first preference formal votes. Shortly after becoming elected, Hatton donated a parliamentary pay rise to charity because it had not been granted by an independent body. Hatton was elected as an independent for this seat for 22 years through the Robert Askin, Tom Lewis, Eric Willis, Neville Wran, Barrie Unsworth, Nick Greiner and John Fahey governments until 1995. In 1981, Hatton made NSW Independent history by being elected unopposed.

Hatton used parliamentary privilege to expose organised crime in the Griffith mafia, police corruption and malfeasance within government departments and agencies. In 1994, by 46 votes to 45, he forced the minority Fahey Government to establish the Wood Royal Commission into Police Corruption. This ground-breaking royal commission overcame objections from the Independent Commission Against Corruption, led to widespread reform of the NSW Police Force and the establishment of the Police Integrity Commission.

== Later life ==
Hatton continues to advocate for his local community. In 2009 he called for a Royal Commission into property and planning corruption in NSW.

== Return to politics ==
In September 2010, Hatton announced his intention to stand with a team of 21 independents for the New South Wales Legislative Council at the state election on 26 March 2011. The grouping of candidates were known as the John Hatton Independents Team. Hatton and his team were unsuccessful at the 2011 election.

== Honours received ==
- Officer of the Order of Australia, General Division, 1999.
- Churchill Fellow 1989
- Jaycees Australia's Outstanding Young Man of the Year Award, Darwin 1970

== Notes ==
a. The City of Shoalhaven was proclaimed in 1979.

New South Wales Legislative Assembly
Preceded by Jack Beale	Member for South Coast; 1973–1995	Succeeded by Eric Ellis
