= Frank Badgery =

Australian politician

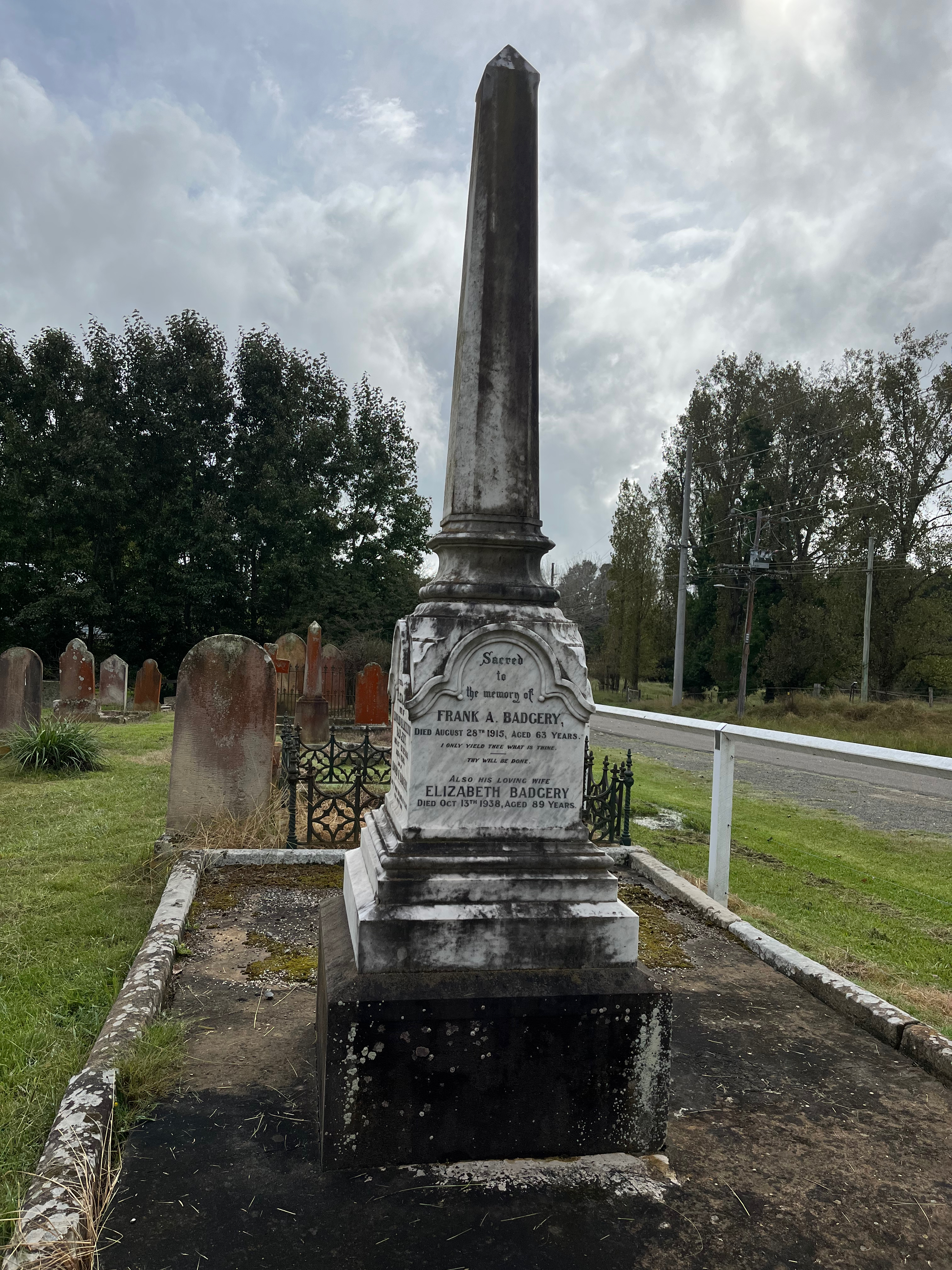
Gravestone of Frank A. Badgery & Elizabeth Badgery (née Evans)

Francis Arthur Badgery (1852 – 28 August 1915) was a British-born Australian politician.

He was born in Exeter, the eleventh child of farmer Henry Badgery and Mary Ann Reilly. He came to New South Wales at a young age and attended Camden College in Newtown. On 27 October 1876 he married Elizabeth Evans, with whom he would have five children. He owned property at Sutton Forest and at Roma Downs in Queensland, and later at Queanbeyan. From 1906 he was a Wingecarribee Shire councillor, and he was involved in local government as the first president of the Shires Association. In 1913 he was elected to the New South Wales Legislative Assembly as the Liberal member for Wollondilly, serving until his death at Sutton Forest in 1915.

His brother, Henry Badgery, served in the Legislative Assembly from 1878 to 1885.

New South Wales Legislative Assembly
| Preceded by William McCourt | Member for Wollondilly; 1913–1915 | Succeeded by George Fuller |
