= Jeff Bate =

Australian politician (1906–1984)

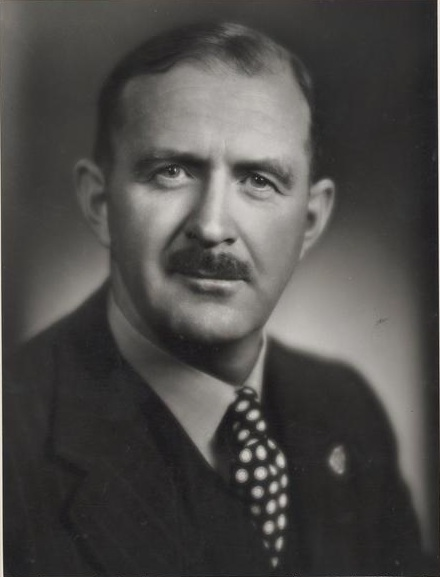

Member of the Australian Parliament for Macarthur
- In office 10 December 1949 – 2 December 1972
- Preceded by: New seat
- Succeeded by: John Kerin

Personal details
- Born: Henry Jefferson Percival Bate; 5 March 1906 Tilba, New South Wales, Australia
- Died: 15 April 1984 (aged 78) Canberra
- Party: United Australia (1938–1945) Liberal (1945–72); Independent (1972)
- Spouses: Gerta Homburg (m. 1928, divorced) Thelma Kirkby (m. 1958; div. 1968) Zara Holt (m. 1969)
- Children: 2
- Education: Newington College; The King's School; University of Sydney

Henry Jefferson Percival "Jeff" Bate (5 March 1906 – 15 April 1984) was an Australian politician, representing the United Australia Party and the Liberal Party of Australia for most of his career, but ended as an independent.

== Early life ==
Jeff Bate was born in Tilba, New South Wales on 5 March 1906, a son of Henry John Bate, a Member of the New South Wales Legislative Assembly, and his wife Lily Percival, a leading contralto. He was educated at Newington College (1918–21), The King's School, Parramatta (1922–23) and the University of Sydney. He became a farmer at Bodalla, Wallaga Lake and Tilba Tilba. He won prizes for dairy fodder conservation at the Royal Agricultural Society show.

== Career ==
Bate became director of the Bodalla Co-operative Dairy Company from 1927, later managing the cheese co-operative. He was a Councillor of the Eurobodalla Shire Council 1929–37, and its President 1936–37.

During World War II he served in the 2nd Australian Imperial Forces as a Lieutenant. He was a member of the Armoured Corps in 1940–45, and saw service in Egypt, Cyprus, the Middle East, New Guinea and New Britain.

He followed his father's footsteps into the NSW Legislative Assembly, where he represented the electoral district of Wollondilly from 1938 to 1949. He represented the United Australia Party until 1945, then joined the newly founded Liberal Party of Australia. He moved to federal politics, and in 1949 he was elected as the House of Representatives member for the seat of Macarthur.

In the lead-up to the 1972 federal election, Bate lost Liberal preselection in Macarthur to Max Dunbier, a former state MP. At a meeting in Bowral on 9 October, he agreed to re-contest the seat as an independent. He immediately ruled out supporting a Labor government if re-elected. A "Bring Back Bate Committee" was established to coordinate his campaign. He decision to stand against an endorsed Liberal candidate resulted in his party membership automatically lapsing. At the election he placed third on first preferences behind Dunbier and ALP candidate John Kerin, who was elected.

== Marriages ==
Bate was married three times: in 1928 to Gerta Ellen Homburg (1907-1985) (two children, John and Margaret); in 1958 to future Country Women's Association president Thelma Kirkby; and on 19 February 1969 to Dame Zara Holt, the widow of Prime Minister Harold Holt.

== Death ==
Bate died in Canberra on 15 April 1984, aged 78.

Parliament of Australia
| Preceded by New seat | Member for Macarthur; 1949–1972 | Succeeded by John Kerin |
New South Wales Legislative Assembly
| Preceded by Mark Morton | Member for Wollondilly; 1938–1949 | Succeeded by Blake Pelly |
