= George Fuller (Australian politician) =

Australian politician (1861–1940)

The Honourable Sir George Fuller KCMG
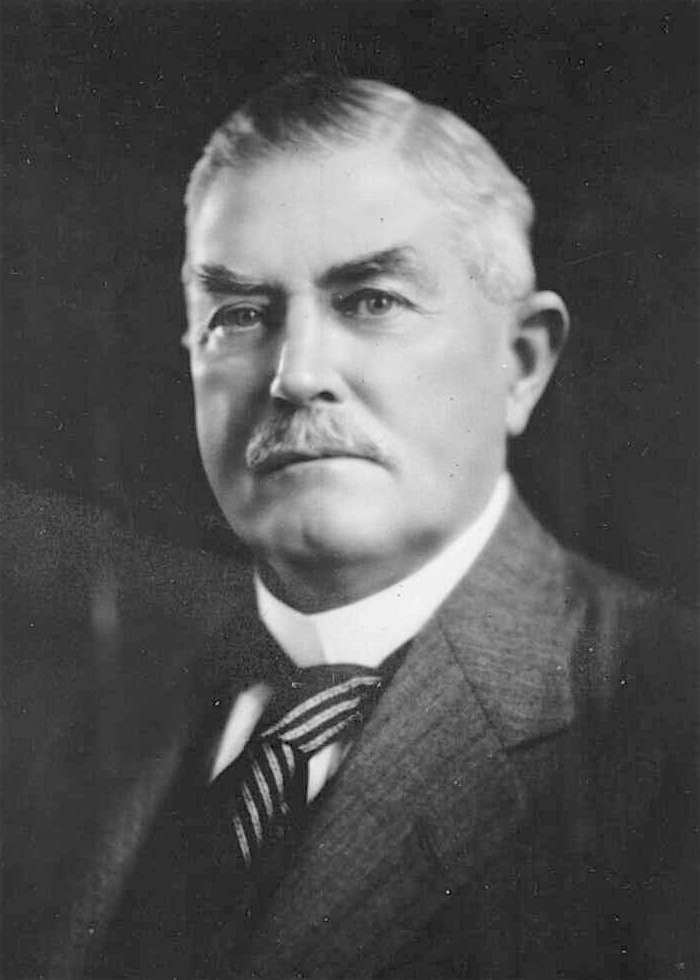
- Official portrait, 1925

22nd Premier of New South Wales
- In office 13 April 1922 – 17 June 1925
- Governor: Walter Edward Davidson; Dudley de Chair
- Preceded by: James Dooley
- Succeeded by: Jack Lang
- In office 20 December 1921 – 20 December 1921
- Governor: Walter Edward Davidson
- Preceded by: James Dooley
- Succeeded by: James Dooley

Federal Minister for Home Affairs
- In office 2 June 1909 – 29 April 1910
- Prime Minister: Alfred Deakin
- Preceded by: Hugh Mahon
- Succeeded by: King O'Malley

Member of the Australian Parliament for Illawarra
- In office 30 March 1901 – 31 May 1913
- Preceded by: New seat
- Succeeded by: George Burns

Member of the New South Wales Legislative Assembly
- In office 16 September 1915 – 7 February 1928
- Preceded by: Frank Badgery
- Succeeded by: Mark Morton
- Constituency: Wollondilly
- In office 9 February 1889 – 25 June 1894
- Preceded by: Frank Badgery
- Succeeded by: Mark Morton
- Constituency: Kiama

Personal details
- Born: 22 January 1861 Kiama, New South Wales, Australia
- Died: 22 July 1940 (aged 79) Darlinghurst, New South Wales, Australia
- Party: Anti-Socialist (1901–1909); Commonwealth Liberal (1909–1913); Liberal Reform (1915–1917); Nationalist (from 1917)
- Spouse: Ada Louisa King (m. 1892)
- Education: Sydney Grammar School; University of Sydney
- Profession: Lawyer

Sir George Warburton Fuller KCMG (22 January 1861 – 22 July 1940) was an Australian politician who served as the 22nd Premier of New South Wales, in office from 1922 to 1925 and for one day in December 1921. He previously served in the federal House of Representatives from 1901 to 1913, representing the Division of Illawarra, and was Minister for Home Affairs under Alfred Deakin from 1909 to 1910.

== Early life ==
Fuller was born in Kiama, New South Wales. He was the son of George Lawrence Fuller. He was educated at Kiama Public School, Sydney Grammar School and at St Andrew's College at the University of Sydney. He received a Bachelor of Arts (Hons) in 1879, and a Master of Arts in 1882 from the University of Sydney. He studied law under Sir William Patrick Manning (eminent judge and university chancellor) and became a barrister in 1884.

== Colonial politics ==
Fuller served in the New South Wales Legislative Assembly for over 18 years. Initially he represented Kiama from 1889 to 1894, but was defeated in 1894 and again in 1898.

== Federal politics ==
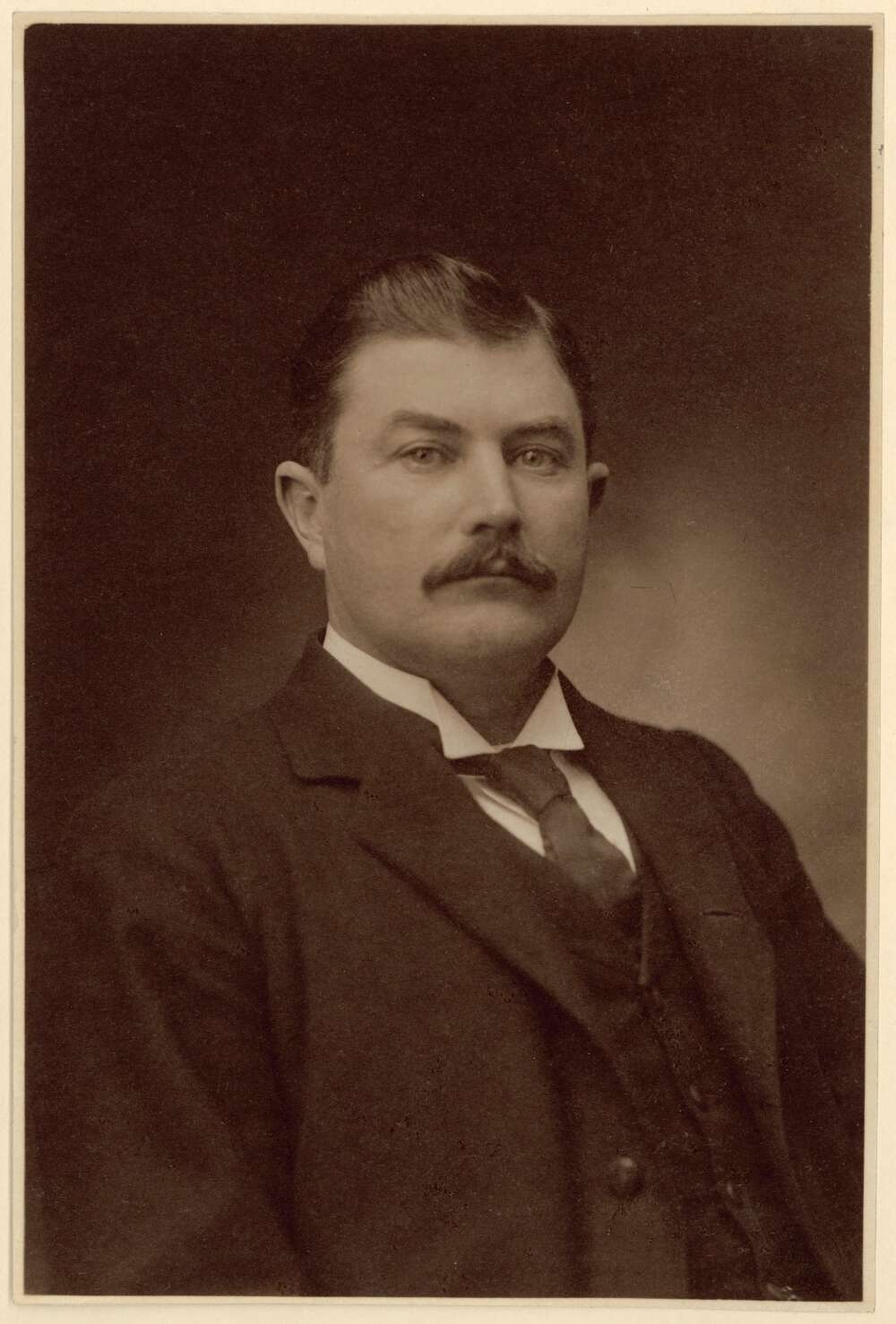
Fuller c. 1901.

Fuller was the first member for Illawarra in the new Australian House of Representatives between 1901 and 1913. He was Minister for Home Affairs in 1909 and 1910 in Alfred Deakin's Commonwealth Liberal Party government and was responsible for making Canberra the national capital. In 1911 he was an Australian representative at the coronation of George V.

== State politics ==
From 1915 to 1928 Fuller represented Wollondilly for the Liberal Party and, from 1916, the Nationalist Party. In the part of 1916 and 1917, he was a leader of New South Wales' Nationalist Party and he became Colonial Secretary (the second most important cabinet position) in 1916.

In 1917, his heavy-handed handling of a strike by rail and tramway workers against the introduction of time cards antagonised the unions and led to a general strike. His promise of higher pay and improved seniority benefits to workers returning to work split the rail unions for most of the twentieth century and the different employment conditions lasted until the Lang Government was elected. His action was seen by supporters as the decisive leadership required in wartime. In 1919, he expanded the state-owned fishing trawler fleet "to provide cheap fish for the mass of the population".

On 3 June 1919, he was appointed as a Knight Commander of the Order of St Michael and St George for his service as Colonial Secretary.

=== Premier ===
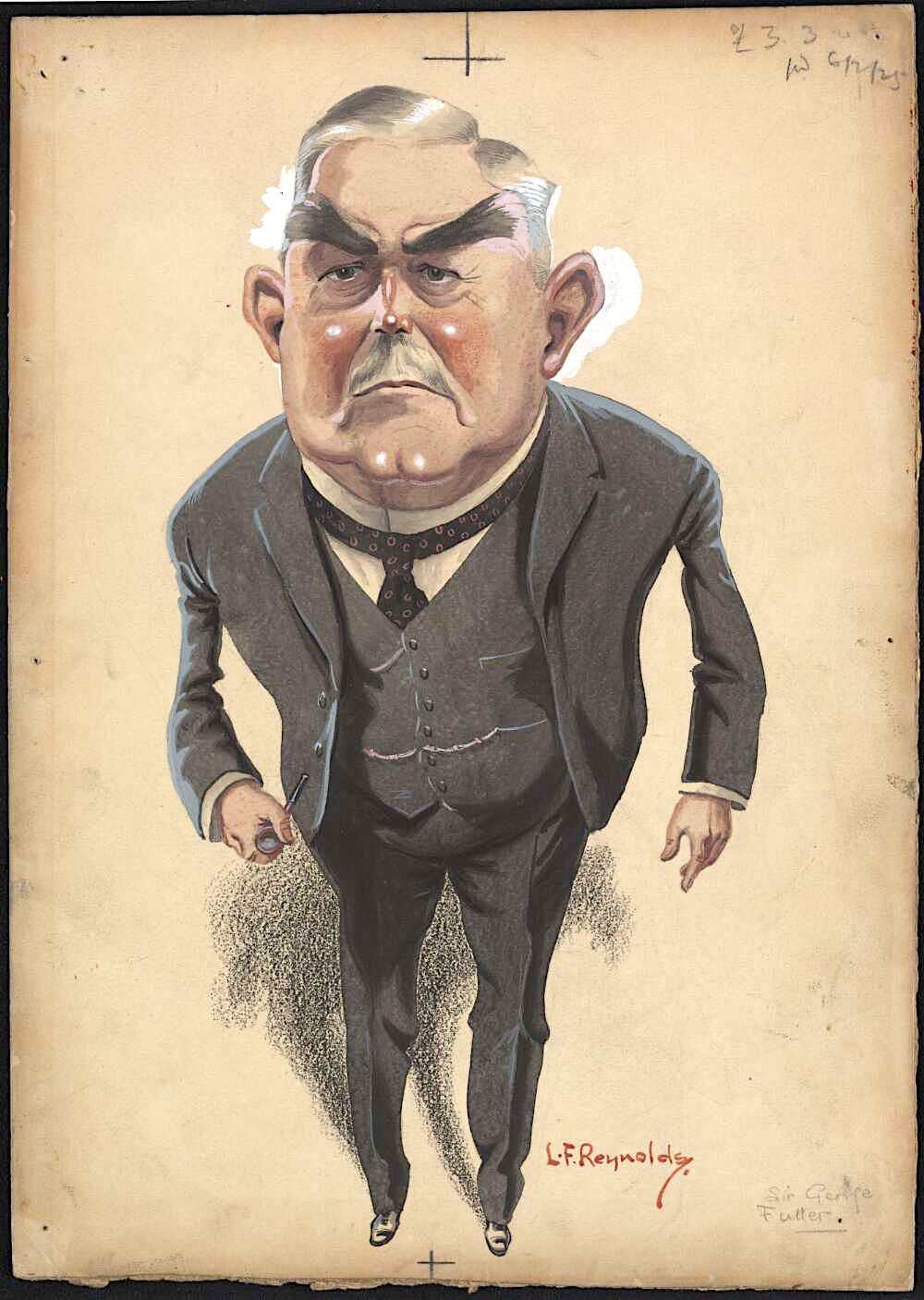
Caricature of Fuller by Len Reynolds (published 1925)

Labor won the 1920 election and Fuller became Leader of the Opposition. In 1921 he took advantage of the death of John Storey to defeat James Dooley's Government on a motion of no confidence and as a result was asked to form a government. But Fuller himself had to give up the Premiership after only seven hours, after losing another motion of no confidence and Dooley returned to office.

In the 1922 state election, Dooley was defeated and Fuller became Premier once again. His government began the construction of the Sydney Harbour Bridge. This time his tenure lasted till the 1925 state election, won by Labor's Jack Lang.

== Later years ==
Shortly after Lang's victory, Fuller resigned from the Nationalist leadership in favour of Thomas Bavin. From 1928 to 1931 he was the state's Agent-General in London. He died in the Sydney suburb of Darlinghurst.

New South Wales Legislative Assembly
Preceded by Angus Cameron	Member for Kiama; 1889 – 1894	Succeeded by Alexander Campbell
Parliament of Australia
New division	Member for Illawarra; 1901 – 1913	Succeeded by George Burns
Political offices
Preceded by Hugh Mahon	Minister for Home Affairs; 1909 – 1910	Succeeded by King O'Malley
New South Wales Legislative Assembly
Preceded by Frank Badgery	Member for Wollondilly; 1915 – 1928	Succeeded by Mark Morton
Political offices
Preceded by George Black	Colonial Secretary of New South Wales; 1916 – 1920	Succeeded by James Dooley
Preceded by David Hall	Vice-President of the Executive Council; 1920	Succeeded by Edward Kavanagh
Preceded by James Dooley	Premier of New South Wales; 1921	Succeeded by James Dooley
Preceded by James Dooley	Premier of New South Wales; 1922 – 1925	Succeeded by Jack Lang
Preceded by Sir Arthur Cocks	Colonial Treasurer of New South Wales; 1925	Succeeded by Jack Lang
Diplomatic posts
Preceded by Viscount Chelmsford	Agent-General for New South Wales; 1928 – 1931	Succeeded by Albert Charles Willis
