= Mark Morton (politician) =

Australian politician

Mark Fairles Morton (28 September 1865 – 28 September 1938) was an Australian politician.

He was born near Nowra to surveyor Henry Gordon Morton and Jane, née Fairlies. He attended Numbaa Public School and Hurstville College in Goulburn before working on the bridge over the Shoalhaven River at Nowra. He subsequently worked as a stock agent before settling in Nowra as an auctioneer. He served on Nowra Council from 1896, with a period as mayor in 1901. From 1906 to 1916 he was a member of the Aborigines Protection Board.

On 6 March 1907, he married Minnie Fuller, with whom he had a son; on 23 April 1919 he married Sarah Emily Fuller. From a political family, his brothers Philip and Henry and his nephew Pat also served in the New South Wales Parliament, while his brother-in-law George Fuller was Premier.

In 1901, he was elected to the New South Wales Legislative Assembly as the Liberal member for Shoalhaven. Shoalhaven was renamed Allowrie in 1904. By the time proportional representation was introduced in 1920, Morton was a Nationalist, but he failed to win a seat until 1922, when he was elected as one of the members for Wollondilly. Defeated in 1925, he returned in 1928 and served until his death at Nowra in 1938.

The Morton National Park is named after him.

New South Wales Legislative Assembly
Preceded by David Davis	Member for Shoalhaven; 1901–1904	Succeeded by Seat abolished
Preceded by New seat	Member for Allowrie; 1904–1920	Succeeded by Seat abolished
Preceded by John Cleary	Member for Wollondilly; 1922–1925; Served alongside: Davies, Fuller	Succeeded by Andrew Lysaght
Preceded by George Fuller	Member for Wollondilly; 1928–1938	Succeeded by Jeff Bate
