= Garry Payne =

Australian public servant

Garry John Alfred Payne AM is a former New South Wales senior public servant and local government administrator. Payne served as Secretary and Director-General of the NSW Department of Local Government from 21 June 1991 to 16 February 2009.

== Public service career ==
Payne joined the NSW Public Service on 2 April 1962, when he was appointed as a clerk in the Forestry Commission of New South Wales. In 1971 he moved to the Department of Education and in November 1972 became a Clerk in the Office of the Public Service Board. He then moved in September 1973 to the Ministry of Cultural Activities and returned to the Public Service Board as an inspector in October 1974. During his periods with the Public Service Board, Payne also served on two occasions as Secretary of the Art Gallery of NSW. In June 1976 he was appointed an Assistant Secretary of the Office of the Public Service Board and in October 1979 was appointed Chief Executive Officer (Regional Administration) in the Department of Education. In 1982 he moved to the Department of Lands but soon returned to the Public Service Board and was appointed Director of the Administration Division in 1986 and then Director of Corporate Services in the Department of Finance in 1987.

In 1989 he was appointed director, Management of the Department of Business & Consumer Affairs as well as Registrar of Credit Unions, Friendly Societies, Co-operative Societies, and Permanent Building Societies. In June 1991 Payne was appointed as Secretary of the Department of Local Government and then Director-General of the Department of Local Government and Co-operatives from 1 July 1991. From 1991 to 1993 Payne was responsible for the development of reforms to the structure & operations of local government in NSW culminating in the replacement of 1919 legislation with the 1993 Local Government Act.These reforms, which involved extensive consultation, modernised local government in NSW. The 1993 Act was regarded as the most significant reform to local council operations in the modern era. Payne retired on 16 February 2009.The department later devolved into the Office of Local Government under the Department of Premier and Cabinet in July 2009. As department head & CEO, Payne served several times as the administrator of local councils following their dismissal by the NSW Government, including as one of the Commissioners of the City of Sydney when it was restructured in 2004, Administrator of Tweed Shire when it was dismissed in 2005 amidst allegations of corruption, and as Administrator of Port Macquarie-Hastings Council following the resignation of Dick Persson from the role in early 2009. During his time as Director General, Payne also served as a member of the Australian Building Codes Board, Deputy Chairman of the Fire Code Reform Centre, Assessor of the Local Government Remuneration Tribunal & from 2008 to 2014 as a member of the NSW Planning Assessment Commission.In 2014 following the Government's removal of the governing body, Payne was appointed as the administrator of the NSW Parents & Citizens Federation.

In the 2006 Australia Day Honours list Payne was appointed a Member of the Order of Australia (AM) "For service to public sector governance in New South Wales through the development and implementation of accounting, policy and legislative reforms relating to the business and administrative operations of local government councils".

Government offices
Preceded by Frederick Arnold Elliott	Secretary of the Department of Local Government; 1991	Department renamed
New department	Director-General of the Department of Local Government and Co-operatives; 1991–1995	Department renamed
New department	Director-General of the Department of Local Government; 1995–2009	Succeeded by as Director-General of Premier and Cabinet
Civic offices
Preceded by Lucy Turnbull as Lord Mayor of Sydney	Commissioner of the City of Sydney; 2004; Served alongside: Turnbull, Pooley	Succeeded by Clover Moore as Lord Mayor of Sydney
Preceded by Warren Polglase as Mayor of Tweed Shire	Administrator of Tweed Shire Council; 2005–2006; Served alongside: Boyd, Turnbull	Succeeded by Frank Willan
Preceded by Lucy Turnbull	Administrator of Tweed Shire Council; 2007–2008; Served alongside: Boyd, Willan	Succeeded by Joan van Lieshout as Mayor of Tweed Shire
Preceded by Dick Persson	Administrator of Port Macquarie-Hastings Council; 2009–2011	Succeeded by Neil Porter
