= South Sydney =

South Sydney may refer to:

- City of South Sydney, a former local government area in Sydney, Australia
- Southern Sydney, the southern suburbs of Sydney
- South Sydney Rabbitohs, a National Rugby League team
