= Stanley Haviland =

Australian public servant (1899–1972)

Stanley Haviland CBE

4th Under Secretary for Local Government
- In office 5 October 1946 – 21 September 1960
- Minister: Joseph Cahill; Jack Renshaw; Pat Hills
- Preceded by: Henry Eastwood Street
- Succeeded by: John Thomas Monaghan

9th President of the Metropolitan Water Sewerage and Drainage Board
- In office 23 September 1960 – 22 September 1965
- Vice President: William Gordon Mathieson; Edwin James Walder
- Preceded by: John Goodsell
- Succeeded by: Edwin James Walder

Chairman of the Sydney Opera House Executive Committee
- In office 2 December 1954 – 14 March 1961

1st Chairman of the Sydney Opera House Trust
- In office 14 March 1961 – 1 May 1969
- Preceded by: New title
- Succeeded by: Sir Philip Baxter

Personal details
- Born: 13 April 1899 Kogarah, Colony of New South Wales
- Died: 2 June 1972 (aged 73) Kingsgrove, New South Wales, Australia
- Resting place: Woronora Memorial Park
- Spouse: Florence Mary Nunn (m. 1920, d. 1971)
- Relations: Chris Haviland (grandnephew)
- Children: Innes Stanley Haviland MBE (1920–1990)
- Profession: Public servant

Stanley Haviland CBE (13 April 1899 – 2 June 1972) was a New South Wales public servant who served as Under Secretary of the Department of Local Government from 1946 to 1960, and was President of the Metropolitan Water Sewerage and Drainage Board from 1960 to 1965. He was also prominent in the development and initiation of the Sydney Opera House as Chairman of the Opera House Executive Committee and the Sydney Opera House Trust from 1954 to 1969.

== Early life and career ==
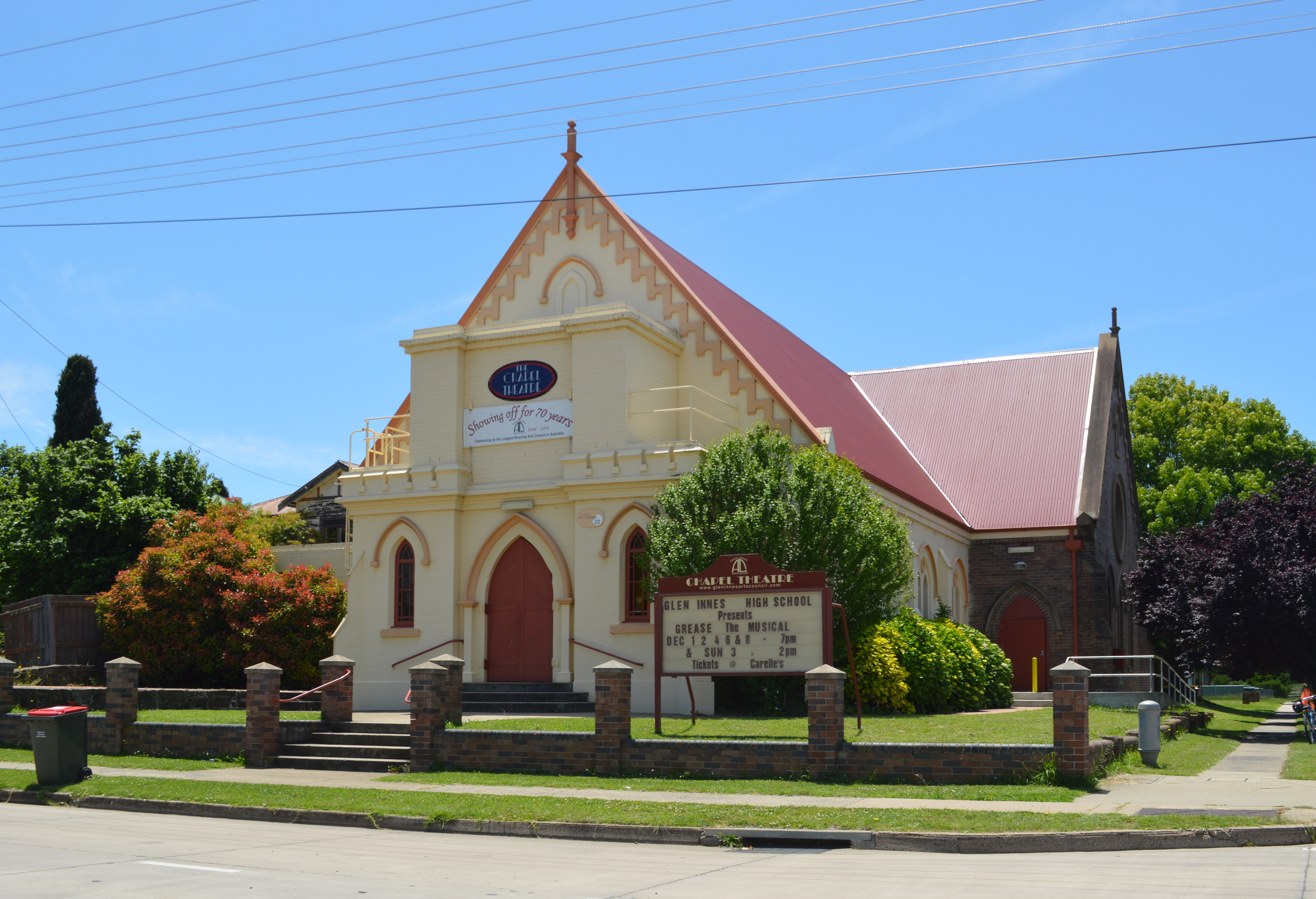
Haviland married Florence Nunn at the Glen Innes Methodist Church in 1920 (now Chapel Theatre).

Stanley Haviland was born on 13 April 1899 at Kogarah in the Colony of New South Wales, the fourth son of Cecil Henry Haviland (1861–1943), clerk (later Victualling Officer for HM Australian Naval Establishments, Sydney, 1913–1923), and Emily Hannah Shaw (1862–1937). After education at Cleveland Street Superior School, Haviland joined the New South Wales Public Service when he was appointed a junior clerk in the Department of Lands on 13 April 1915.

In 1920 he was appointed a Clerk in the Returned Soldiers' Settlement Branch of the Department of Lands. On 16 November 1920, Haviland was married to Florence Mary Nunn at the Methodist Church, Glen Innes, by the Rev. H. W. Woodhouse. Following a honeymoon at Terrigal, the Havilands moved to the Sydney suburb of Bexley. On 26 August 1921 a son, Innes Stanley Haviland, was born at their Bexley residence, 'Lindisfarne' on Glenfarne Street.

== Public service career ==
=== Local Government ===
On 1 May 1931, Haviland left the Lands Department and was appointed as a First Clerk of the Department of Local Government. On 1 February 1936 the Department of Public Works and the Department of Local Government were amalgamated as the Department of Works and Local Government and Haviland was further promoted as a Special Officer and Secretary to the Local Government Examination Committees from the same date. However, on 1 November 1936 Haviland was further promoted to the senior position of Assistant Under Secretary of the department. On his appointment to this position, the Municipality of Bexley sent a letter of congratulations.

When the department underwent a reshuffle in 1941, with Local Government being moved to the new Department of Local Government and Housing, Haviland retained his post as Assistant Under Secretary from 2 June 1941. On 20 June 1945, Haviland was appointed by the Minister for Local Government, Joseph Cahill, as a commissioner on the Clancy Royal Commission on Local Government Boundaries charged with investigating whether the boundaries of the City of Sydney should be extended and which areas should be amalgamated, and whether any other areas in the County of Cumberland be united, divided or otherwise altered and reconstituted as a municipality or shire.

The final report of the Royal Commission initially recommended much more ambitious targets for amalgamations, including a City of Sydney that included all councils from Ashfield and Marrickville to Botany, Randwick and Vaucluse and north to include North Sydney and Mosman. A minority report authored by the third commissioner, Ronald Storey, the Mayor of Drummoyne, recommended reducing 66 councils to 34, a more modest target compared to the majority's recommendation of 66 to 18. A more ambitious plan to create eight new cities in the County of Cumberland (known as the "Eight Cities Plan"), was progressed by Haviland, and was seriously considered by state cabinet following the release of the commission's report in mid-1946. This plan, however, met with significant opposition from local government circles and the cabinet eventually decided in July 1947 on a plan for legislation to follow the first recommendation of reducing 66 councils to 14.

With the retirement of the Under Secretary of the department, Henry Eastwood Street, in June 1946, Haviland became Acting Under Secretary from 1 July 1946 and succeeded him as substantive Under Secretary for Local Government on Street's full retirement from 5 October 1946. In 1951 and 1954 respectively he chaired the committees charged with organising Commonwealth of Australia Jubilee and with the royal visit. In the 1957 New Year Honours he was made a Commander of the Order of the British Empire (CBE) for his work as the head of the Department of Local Government. He had already received the King George VI Coronation Medal (1937), and the Queen Elizabeth II Coronation Medal (1953).

=== Sydney Opera House ===
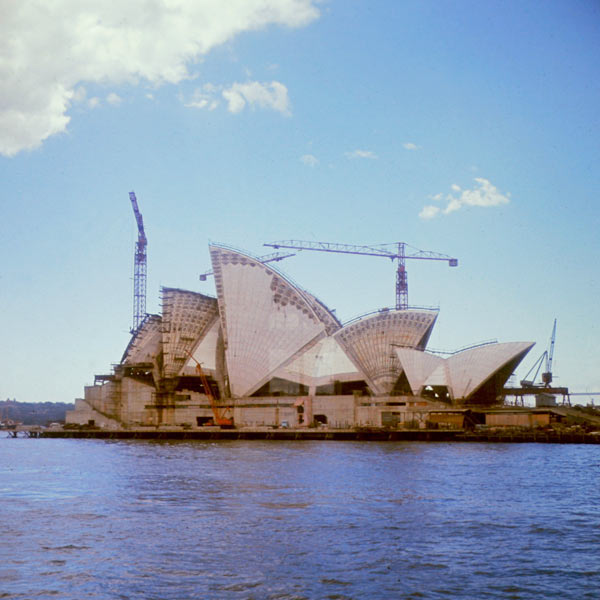
The Sydney Opera House under construction in 1966. Haviland led the committees directing the design, location and development of the Opera House project from 1954 to 1969.

In late 1954, Premier Joseph Cahill appointed Haviland to serve as chairman of the Sydney Opera House Executive Committee, with the responsibility to investigate suggestions for its location and design. On his appointment as chairman, another member of the first committee, Charles Moses (the general manager of the Australian Broadcasting Commission), later noted: "The Premier wanted a senior public servant as chairman. He could provide secretarial assistance so that the committee functioned and didn't have to get some honorary secretary. Also, this enabled the Government to keep its eye on what was doing, what was happening". The committee eventually considered 14 proposed sites for an Opera House, including Fort Macquarie (Bennelong Point), the issue of public subscription to fund the Opera House, and the design competition, which was won by Jørn Utzon. On 14 March 1961 Haviland's committee that had overseen the launch of the opera house project was transformed into the Sydney Opera House Trust by the Sydney Opera Trust Act, 1961, with Haviland appointed as the chairman.

Haviland was a strong supporter of the choice of Utzon and his design, and defended him in July 1962 in response to criticisms of Utzon's regular changes and tweaks to his design in the construction stage: "Most criticisms seem to have overlooked the subtle excellence of Mr Utzon's imaginative and comprehensive conceptions so widely acclaimed in 1957, and the necessity to reconcile an extraordinarily wide variety of requirement with a scholarly flexibility of design. The Opera House itself commands admiration throughout the world and it will be a source of great pride to the citizens of Sydney particularly." Under Haviland's direction, the new trust supervised the remaining construction of the opera house including following the resignation of Utzon in 1966, and he would serve until the enactment of the Sydney Opera House Trust (Amendment) Act, 1969 on 1 May 1969.

=== Sydney Water Board ===
Haviland also served on the Metropolitan Water Sewerage and Drainage Board, serving as vice-president from 1955 to 1960. When Haviland retired from his position as Under Secretary for Local Government in September 1960, as a gesture of the esteem with which he was held by the local governments across the state, he was presented with a testimonial fund and an official presentation containing messages of goodwill from over 200 shire, municipal and county councils at the Local Government Conference at Orange on 25 October 1960.

When the president of the Metropolitan Water Sewerage and Drainage Board, John Goodsell, was appointed to chair the Public Service Board, Haviland was appointed to serve from 23 September 1960 as president of the board. His term of office was noted for having "promoted staff relations, eased formality, and was involved in improving and beautifying picnic areas at the board's dams." Haviland was responsible for the development of public facilities and picnic areas in the former construction zone around Warragamba Dam when it was completed in 1960. When Haviland retired from the board, the main picnic area and park was subsequently named in his honour in December 1965 as 'Haviland Park', which is now listed on the New South Wales Heritage Register.

== Later life and legacy ==
When his term as president of the water board ended on 22 September 1965, Haviland did not go into quiet retirement and had been appointed on 25 August 1965 to serve as a member of the Royal Commission of inquiry into rating, valuation and local government finance, chaired by Justice Rae Else-Mitchell. The commission reported in 1967, with its main recommendation to establish the Local Government Grants Commission accepted by the government of Robert Askin.

Haviland was a member of the State councils of the Royal Institute of Public Administration and the National Trust of Australia, the board of the Australian Elizabethan Theatre Trust (1956–1970), the Australian Museum Trust (1960–1970) and the Royal National Park trust. He was also an active Rotarian (1948–1972) and the president of the St George area of the Boy Scouts' Association (1958–1971).

Ten months after the death of his wife, Haviland died of coronary artery disease on 2 June 1972 at his Kingsgrove home and was cremated. He was buried at Woronora Memorial Park on 7 June 1972 alongside his wife, mother and father, and paternal grandparents. On his death the Sydney Morning Herald noted that he was a "dedicated public servant, he believed his function was to advise the Government instead of making public statements".

He left an estate valued at $85,462, with the majority left to his de facto partner, Ruth Florence Williams (who worked as a typist at the Water Board), and the remainder to his only son Innes Stanley Haviland. Innes Haviland contested the will in the New South Wales Supreme Court, requesting additional funds to support his family, and was subsequently granted an additional legacy of $19,000 in a decision of the chief judge in equity, Laurence Street.

His only son, Innes Haviland, became an engineer, having graduated from the University of Sydney with a Bachelor of Engineering in 1943, and served as a lieutenant in the 23rd Field Company, Royal Australian Engineers in the New Guinea Campaign (1943–1945). Innes Haviland was later elected as an alderman of the Municipality of North Sydney (Belmore Ward) and Mayor of North Sydney (1966–1968, 1974–1975), and was a councillor and president of the Sydney County Council (1975–1977). He was made a Member of the Order of the British Empire (MBE) in 1976 and awarded the Queen Elizabeth II Silver Jubilee Medal in 1977.

Government offices
Preceded by Henry Eastwood Street	Under Secretary for Local Government; 1946 – 1960	Succeeded by John Thomas Monaghan
New title	Chairman of the Sydney Opera House Executive Committee; 1954 – 1961	Became the Sydney Opera House Trust
New title	Chairman of the Sydney Opera House Trust; 1960 – 1969	Succeeded by Sir Philip Baxter
Preceded by John Goodsell	Vice-President of the Metropolitan Water Sewerage and Drainage Board; 1955 – 1960	Succeeded by William Gordon Mathieson
Preceded by John Goodsell	President of the Metropolitan Water Sewerage and Drainage Board; 1960 – 1965	Succeeded by Edwin James Walder
