= Lucy Turnbull =

Australian politician (born 1958)

Lucy Turnbull AO
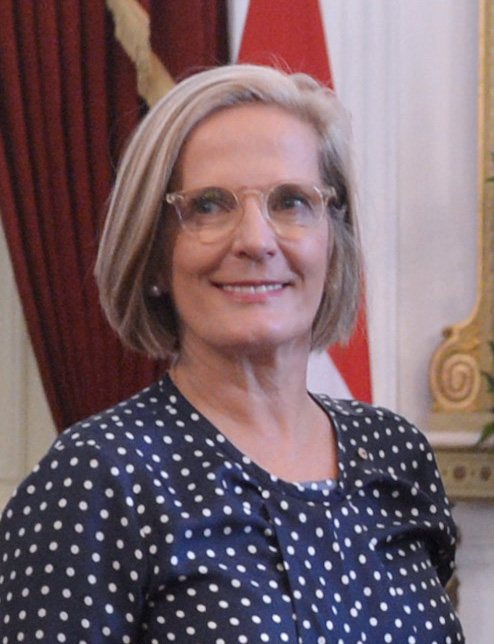
- Turnbull in 2015

79th Lord Mayor of Sydney
- In office 7 April 2003 – 6 February 2004
- Deputy: Dixie Coulton
- Preceded by: Frank Sartor
- Succeeded by: Clover Moore

21st Deputy Lord Mayor of Sydney
- In office 18 September 1999 – 7 April 2003
- Lord Mayor: Frank Sartor
- Preceded by: Henry Tsang
- Succeeded by: Dixie Coulton

Councillor of the City of Sydney
- In office September 1999 – 6 February 2004

Spouse of the Prime Minister of Australia
- In role 15 September 2015 – 24 August 2018
- Preceded by: Margie Abbott
- Succeeded by: Jenny Morrison

Personal details
- Born: Lucinda Mary Hughes; 30 March 1958 (age 68) Mittagong, New South Wales, Australia
- Party: Liberal (until 2023)
- Other political affiliations: Living City Independents (1999–2004)
- Spouse: Malcolm Turnbull (m. 1980)
- Children: 2
- Parent: Tom Hughes (father)
- Relatives: Robert Hughes (uncle); Geoffrey Forrest Hughes (grandfather); Thomas Hughes (great-grandfather)
- Education: University of Sydney; University of New South Wales

Lucinda Mary Turnbull AO (née Hughes; born 30 March 1958) is an Australian businesswoman, philanthropist, and former local government politician. She served on the Sydney City Council from 1999 to 2004, including as Lord Mayor of Sydney from 2003 to 2004 – the first woman to hold the position. She has since held positions on a number of urban planning bodies, including as chief commissioner of the Greater Sydney Commission from 2015 to 2020. Her husband Malcolm Turnbull was the 29th prime minister of Australia from 2015 to 2018.

== Early life and education ==
Born Lucinda Mary Hughes, Turnbull is the daughter of Tom Hughes, a former Attorney-General of Australia. Her great-grandfather was Sir Thomas Hughes, the first Lord Mayor of Sydney. She was educated at Kincoppal-Rose Bay, Frensham School in Mittagong, Sydney Girls High School and the University of Sydney, where she graduated with a Bachelor of Laws in 1982. Turnbull also holds a Master of Business Administration from the Australian Graduate School of Management of the University of New South Wales. In September 2017, Turnbull received an honorary Doctorate of Letters for her substantial and sustained service and contribution to the University and to the Greater Western Sydney region.

== Political career ==
Turnbull was elected to Council in 1999 on the Living Sydney independent platform and was immediately elevated to the position of Deputy Lord Mayor, serving under Lord Mayor Frank Sartor. When Sartor resigned as Lord Mayor to enter NSW politics, Turnbull was elected as his replacement. In early 2004, the Carr Labor government dismissed the City of Sydney and South Sydney Councils and forced their amalgamation. Turnbull was subsequently appointed as one of three Commissioners assigned with the responsibility of establishing a new governance structure for the merged council entity. Turnbull, feeling the pressure of the Carr Labor government, approached Clover Moore and encouraged her to run as Lord Mayor in the hope that Labor would not gain control of the City of Sydney.

As Lord Mayor, Turnbull awarded Nobel Peace Prize laureate Aung San Suu Kyi the keys to the city of Sydney in 2003.

== Business and community involvement ==
With a background in commercial law and investment banking, Turnbull is a Director and Secretary of Turnbull & Partners Pty Ltd, a private investment company. From October 2010 to November 17, 2017 she was Non-Executive Chairman of biotechnology company Prima BioMed. She was appointed on 25 February 2022 as a Non-Executive Director of Australian Securities Exchange listed Immutep (formerly Prima BioMed). From August 2013 until October 2015, she was a director of SeaLink.

Turnbull has a long-standing interest in cities and their planning, governance and management, as well as the importance of technological innovation to the national economy. In 1999, she published a book called Sydney: Biography of a City. She was an independent member of the Sydney Metropolitan Development Authority, which was charged with the urban renewal and revitalisation of several precincts in Sydney, including Redfern–Waterloo. She was an independent member of the Redfern–Waterloo Authority from its establishment in 2004 until its repeal in December 2011. She is a former board member of the Australian Technology Park, Redfern. From 2004 until 2011, Turnbull served as Deputy Chair of the Committee for Sydney, a think tank for Greater Sydney representing public, private and not-for-profit sectors and focused on the future of the metropolitan city, and chaired it from 2011 until 2015.

Turnbull is a former deputy chair of the Council of Australian Governments (COAG) City Expert Advisory Panel (appointed July 2010), which reported to the COAG Reform Council. The expert panel was charged with preparing a report published on 1 March 2012, advising COAG Reform Council on whether metropolitan planning systems were consistent with agreed COAG criteria.

Turnbull has also been active in the not-for-profit sector. She serves on boards of the Biennale of Sydney, the Redfern Foundation Limited and the Turnbull Foundation. She is the Patron of DICE Kids, an organisation created at Policy Hack in 2015 and Patron of the United States Studies Centre at the University of Sydney. She is also a board member of the Cancer Institute of New South Wales. She has previously chaired the Sydney Children's Hospital Foundation, the Sydney Cancer Centre and the Sydney Festival Limited. From 2006–2010, she was a board member of Melbourne IT and before that a board member of Webcentral.

On 26 January 2011, Turnbull was appointed an Officer of the Order of Australia (AO) for her distinguished service to the community, particularly through philanthropic contributions to, and fundraising support for, a range of medical, social welfare, educational, youth and cultural organisations, to local government, and to business.

In 2012, Turnbull was awarded an honorary Doctorate of Business by the University of New South Wales, and in 2016, she was appointed adjunct professor at the Faculty of Built Environment, University of NSW. In 2017, she was awarded an honorary Doctorate of Letters from Western Sydney University which she received for her substantial and sustained service and contribution to the University and the Greater Western Sydney region.

Turnbull chaired the Committee for Sydney from 2012 to 2015. In 2015 she was appointed Chief Commissioner of the Greater Sydney Commission, a role she fulfilled until March 2020 when she resigned to work with her husband in their family business.

Turnbull was appointed chair of the Sydney Opera House Trust, commencing 1 January 2021.

== Personal life ==
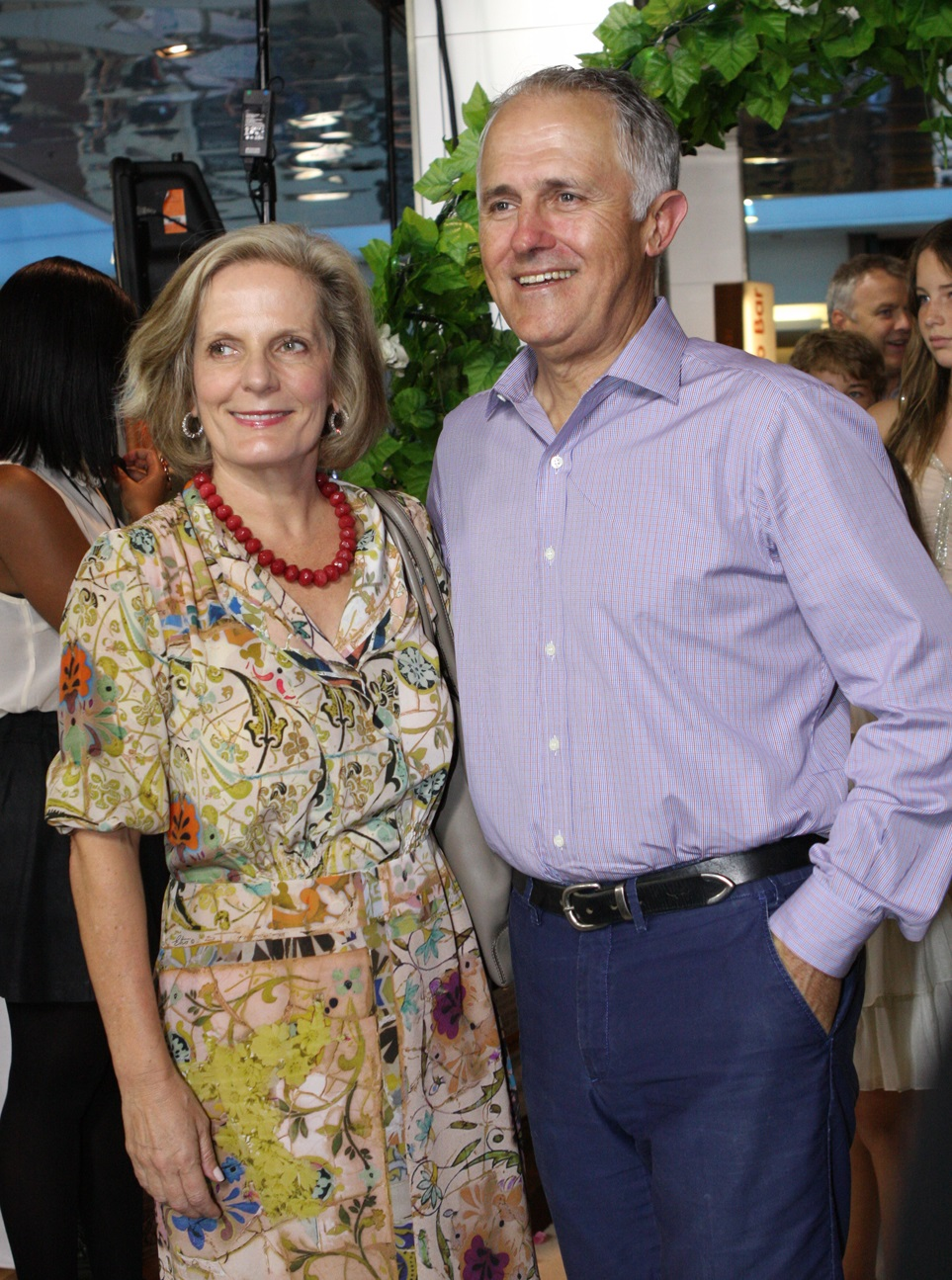
Turnbull and her husband, Malcolm Turnbull, in January 2012

Lucy Hughes was aged 19 when she met Malcolm Turnbull, who was aged 23. Their first date was a dinner with Bob Carr and his wife Helena. Hughes and Turnbull were married on 22 March 1980 in Cumnor, Oxfordshire, England, United Kingdom by a Church of England priest, despite Turnbull then being Presbyterian and Hughes Roman Catholic. After two miscarriages, Lucy and Malcolm Turnbull had two children, Alex (b. 1982) and Daisy (b. 1985). Malcolm Turnbull was a member of the House of Representatives for Wentworth between 2004 and 2018, representing the Liberal Party. He had two stints as the party's leader, and in that capacity, in his second term served as the 29th Prime Minister of Australia, in the Turnbull government.

During her husband's term as prime minister, the couple resided at The Lodge. They own properties in Point Piper, the Hunter Valley and an apartment in Canberra. They also own an apartment in New York City.

== Published works ==
- Turnbull, Lucy (1999). Sydney – biography of a city. Random House. ISBN 0-09-183905-X.

Civic offices
Preceded by Henry Tsang	Deputy Lord Mayor of Sydney; 1999–2003	Succeeded by Dixie Coulton
Preceded by Frank Sartor	Lord Mayor of Sydney; 2003–2004	Succeeded by Clover Moore
Preceded by Herself as Lord Mayor of Sydney	Commissioner of the City of Sydney; 2004; Served alongside: Pooley, Payne	Succeeded by Clover Moore as Lord Mayor of Sydney
Preceded by Warren Polglase as Mayor of Tweed Shire	Administrator of Tweed Shire Council; 2005 – 2007; Served alongside: Boyd, Payne/Willan	Succeeded by Garry Payne
Honorary titles
Preceded by Margie Abbott	Spouse of the Prime Minister of Australia; 2015–2018	Succeeded by Jenny Morrison
Government offices
New title	Chief Commissioner of the Greater Sydney Commission; 2015–2020	Succeeded by Geoff Roberts
Preceded by Nicholas Moore	Chairperson of the Sydney Opera House Trust; 2021–date	Incumbent
