= Minister for Local Government (New South Wales) =

Minister in the Government of New South Wales

- Incumbent; Ron Hoenig since 5 April 2023
- Department of Planning and Environment
- Style: The Honourable
- Nominator: Premier of New South Wales
- Appointer: Governor of New South Wales
- Inaugural holder: John Daniel FitzGerald
- Formation: 15 November 1916
- Website: www.olg.nsw.gov.au

The Minister for Local Government, currently held since 5 April 2023 by Ron Hoenig, is a minister in the New South Wales Government and has responsibilities which includes all local government areas and related legislation in New South Wales, the most primary of which is the Local Government Act 1993. The minister administers the portfolio through the Planning and Environment cluster, in particular through the Office of Local Government, and a range of other government agencies. The minister assists the senior cluster minister, the Minister for Climate Change, the Environment, and Heritage. Both ministers are responsible to the Parliament of New South Wales.

== Administrative history ==
With the significant expansion of Local Government areas in the early 1900s the first formal government body with the specific responsibility for Local Government was established by the Local Government (Shires) Act, 1905, which created the "Local Government Branch" of the Public Works Department on 9 December 1905. On 5 January 1906 the Secretary for Public Works was charged with its administration. On 15 March 1915 the Local Government Branch was made independent as the "Department of Local Government" and the process of its full establishment culminated with the appointment of the first Minister for Local Government on 15 November 1916, John Daniel FitzGerald. Fitzgerald was responsible for steering through the first major piece of legislation dealing with local government regulations and powers in the Local Government Act 1919. The new Act provided for the establishment of County Councils to enable Municipalities and Shires to combine for the carrying out of large works that affected more than one district, most prominently in the area of electricity supply, with the Sydney County Council being a prime example.

In February 1936 the department merged with the Public Works department to become the "Department of Works and Local Government". On 2 June 1941, this short-lived department was abolished and "Department of Local Government and Housing" succeeded it. The then Minister for Local Government and Housing took on responsibilities for social housing in the state. This body then became the Department of Local Government again on 8 June 1944. In 1948 the new Minister Joseph Cahill was responsible for moving the most significant reform to local government since 1919 when he passed through the Local Government (Areas) Act 1948, which placed the City of Sydney within the regulations of the 1919 act (by repealing the Sydney Corporations Act 1932) and entailed large-scale amalgamations of local councils in Sydney.

On 6 November 1981 the department was abolished and replaced by the "Local Government Office" of the Department of Local Government and Lands. On 29 February 1984 a new Department of Local Government replaced the functions of the Office of Local Government. This Department of Local Government was amalgamated with the Registry of Co-operatives on 1 July 1991 to create the Department of Local Government and Co-operatives headed by the Minister for Local Government and Co-operatives. The second minister of this title, Garry West, was responsible for the passing of the Local Government Act 1993, which repealed the 1919 act, modernised the controls and powers of Local Government and formalised the command structure with the Minister at its head. This continues to be the main piece of legislation operated by the Minister today. On 6 April 1995 the responsibility for co-operatives was transferred to the Department of Consumer Affairs.

On 1 July 2009 the Department of Local Government was abolished and its functions were transferred to the Department of Premier and Cabinet as the Office of Local Government. In 2011 these functions were moved to the Department of Planning and Environment. Following the 2019 state election, the Office of Local Government was abolished and its functions, together with a broad range of other functions were transferred to the newly formed Department of Planning and Industry.

== Ministerial powers ==
The minister has significant powers to regulate and control the operations of local governments. Currently, under section 255 of the Local Government Act 1993, the Minister has the power initiate investigations or a public inquiry into the behaviours of councillors and council staff and, if the findings are against the council's ability to operate within the law or public expectations, the minister can then recommend to the Governor for dismissal of the council. Prominent examples of this occurring under the 1993 Act and previous Acts include:

- Port Macquarie-Hastings Council in 2008 (Incompetence).
- City of Wollongong in 2008 (Corruption).
- Tweed Shire in 2005 (Corruption).
- City of Liverpool in 2004 (Incompetence).
- Walgett Shire in 2004 (Incompetence).
- Rylstone Shire in 2004 (Incompetence).
- Municipality of Leichhardt in 1953 (Corruption).
- Warringah Council in 1967 (Corruption), 1985 and 2003 (Failed public expectations).
- City of Maitland in 1997 (Disgraceful conduct of councillors).
- Municipality of Randwick in 1973 (Corruption).
- City of Bankstown in 1933, 1954, and 1963 (Corruption)

== List of ministers ==
=== Local government ===
Title	Minister	Party	Term start	Term end	Time in office	Notes
Minister for Local Government	Jack FitzGerald	Nationalist	15 November 1916	12 April 1920	3 years, 149 days	
Minister for Local Government	Thomas Mutch	Labor	12 April 1920	10 October 1921	1 year, 181 days	
Minister for Local Government	George Cann	Labor	10 October 1921	20 December 1921	71 days	
Minister for Local Government	John Fitzpatrick	Nationalist	20 December 1921	20 December 1921	7 hours	
Minister for Local Government	George Cann	Labor	20 December 1921	13 April 1922	114 days	
Minister for Local Government	John Fitzpatrick	Nationalist	13 April 1922	17 June 1925	3 years, 65 days	
Minister for Local Government	George Cann	Labor	17 June 1925	24 March 1926	280 days	
Minister for Local Government	Joseph Fitzgerald	Labor	24 March 1926	26 May 1927	1 year, 63 days	
Minister for Local Government	Tom Keegan	Labor	26 May 1927	18 October 1927	145 days	
Minister for Local Government	Michael Bruxner	Country	18 October 1927	3 November 1930	3 years, 16 days	
Minister for Local Government	William McKell	Labor	4 November 1930	17 June 1931	225 days	
Minister for Local Government	James McGirr	Labor	17 June 1931	15 October 1931	120 days	
Minister for Local Government	James McGirr	Labor (NSW)	15 October 1931	13 May 1932	120 days	
Minister for Local Government	Michael Bruxner	Country	16 May 1932	17 June 1932	32 days	
Minister for Local Government	Joseph Jackson	United Australia	18 June 1932	14 February 1933	241 days	
Minister for Local Government	Eric Spooner	United Australia	15 February 1933	21 July 1939	6 years, 156 days	
Minister for Local Government	Bertram Stevens	United Australia	21 July 1939	5 August 1939	15 days	
Minister for Local Government	Alexander Mair	United Australia	5 August 1939	16 August 1939	11 days	
Minister for Local Government	Lewis Martin	United Australia	16 August 1939	16 May 1941	1 year, 273 days	
Minister for Local Government and Housing	James McGirr	Labor	16 May 1941	8 June 1944	3 years, 23 days	
Minister for Local Government	Joseph Cahill	Labor	8 June 1944	23 February 1953	8 years, 260 days	
Minister for Local Government	Jack Renshaw	Labor	23 February 1953	28 October 1959	6 years, 247 days	
Minister for Local Government	Pat Hills	Labor	28 October 1959	13 May 1965	5 years, 197 days	
Minister for Local Government	Pat Morton	Liberal	13 May 1965	19 June 1972	7 years, 37 days	
Minister for Local Government	Charles Cutler	Country	19 June 1972	16 December 1975	3 years, 180 days	
Minister for Local Government	Col Fisher	Country	17 December 1975	23 January 1976	37 days	
Minister for Local Government	Tom Lewis	Liberal	23 January 1976	14 May 1976	112 days	
Minister for Local Government	Harry Jensen	Labor	14 May 1976	2 October 1981	5 years, 141 days	
Minister for Local Government	Lin Gordon	Labor	2 October 1981	10 February 1984	2 years, 131 days	
Minister for Local Government	Kevin Stewart	Labor	10 February 1984	1 January 1986	1 year, 325 days	
Minister for Local Government	Peter Anderson	Labor	1 January 1986	6 February 1986	36 days	
Minister for Local Government	Janice Crosio	Labor	6 February 1986	21 March 1988	2 years, 44 days	
Minister for Local Government	David Hay	Liberal	25 March 1988	6 June 1991	3 years, 73 days	
Minister for Local Government	Gerry Peacocke	National NSW	6 June 1991	26 May 1993	1 year, 354 days	
Minister for Local Government and Co-operatives	Garry West	National NSW	26 May 1993	27 June 1994	1 year, 32 days	
Minister for Local Government and Co-operatives	Ted Pickering	Liberal	27 June 1994	4 April 1995	281 days	
Minister for Local Government	Ernie Page	Labor	4 April 1995	8 April 1999	4 years, 4 days	
Minister for Local Government	Harry Woods	Labor	8 April 1999	2 April 2003	3 years, 359 days	
Minister for Local Government	Tony Kelly	Labor	2 April 2003	3 August 2005	2 years, 123 days	
Minister for Local Government	Kerry Hickey	Labor	3 August 2005	2 April 2007	1 year, 242 days	
Minister for Local Government	Paul Lynch	Labor	2 April 2007	5 September 2008	1 year, 156 days	
Minister for Local Government	Barbara Perry	Labor	8 September 2008	28 March 2011	2 years, 201 days	
Minister for Local Government	Don Page	National	2 April 2011	23 April 2014	3 years, 21 days	
Minister for Local Government	Paul Toole	National	23 April 2014	30 January 2017	2 years, 282 days	
Minister for Local Government	Gabrielle Upton	Liberal	30 January 2017	23 March 2019	2 years, 52 days	
Minister for Local Government	Shelley Hancock	Liberal	2 April 2019	21 December 2021	2 years, 263 days	
Minister for Local Government	Wendy Tuckerman	Liberal	21 December 2021	25 March 2023	1 year, 94 days	
Minister for Local Government	Ron Hoenig	Labor	5 April 2023	Incumbent	3 years, 227 days	

== Former ministerial titles ==
=== Assistant ministers ===
Title	Minister	Party	Term start	Term end	Time in office	Notes
Assistant Minister for Local Government	Joseph Fitzgerald	Labor	17 June 1925	24 March 1926	280 days	
Assistant Minister for Local Government	Jack Renshaw	Labor	3 April 1952	23 February 1953	326 days	

== See also ==
- List of New South Wales government agencies
