= Tony Pooley (politician) =

Australian politician (born 1960)

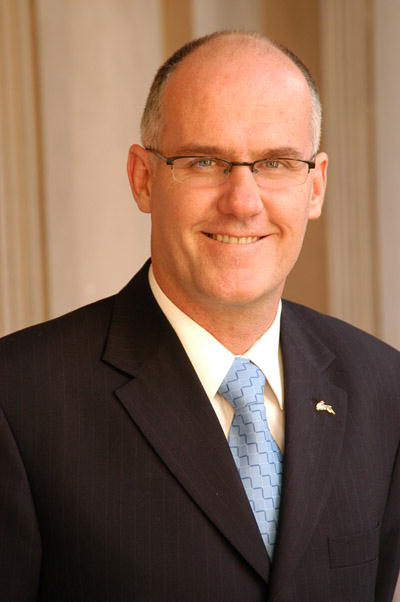

4th Mayor of South Sydney
- In office 2 September 2002 – 5 February 2004
- Deputy: Peter Furness
- Preceded by: John Fowler
- Succeeded by: Council abolished

26th Deputy Lord Mayor of Sydney
- In office 17 September 2007 – 13 September 2008
- Lord Mayor: Clover Moore
- Preceded by: Chris Harris
- Succeeded by: Marcelle Hoff

Personal details
- Born: 7 March 1960 (age 66) New South Wales, Australia
- Party: Australian Labor Party (New South Wales Branch)
- Spouse: Joanna Quilty

Anthony Robert Pooley (born 7 March 1960) is an Australian public servant and former local government politician, who served from 2002 as the last Mayor of South Sydney before its amalgamation with the City of Sydney in 2004.

== Political career ==
Pooley was elected as a Labor Councillor in 2000 to the City of South Sydney and was subsequently elected as Mayor in 2002. In August 2003, while serving as mayor, Pooley voted with the council majority of 7–2 to implement a relationships register for same-sex couples, being the first of its kind at the time in Australia. After supporting proposals to amalgamate the council the City of Sydney, in February 2004, when this was brought into effect, Pooley was appointed as one of three Commissioners administering the newly constituted City of Sydney. When the new council was elected in March 2004, Pooley was one of three Labor councillors elected to the council. In September 2007 Pooley was elected to a single term as Deputy Lord Mayor. Pooley did not seek re-election to Council at the September 2008 elections.

== Later career ==
In 2007, while still serving as a councillor, Pooley took up a position as Chief of Staff to the Minister for Ageing and Disability Services, Kristina Keneally. He continued as Keneally's chief of staff until December 2009, when she was appointed Premier, at which point he became her Deputy Chief of Staff, serving until Labor lost office in 2011. In 2014, Pooley was called before the Independent Commission Against Corruption as a witness to testify regarding doctored cabinet minutes relating to Australian Water Holdings. From 2012 to 2013, Polley was Deputy Chief of Staff to federal minister Tony Burke in his capacity as Minister for Sustainability, Environment, Water, Population and Communities.

Pooley is currently the NSW operations manager of National Disability Services, a private sector disability services organisation. A longtime resident of Redfern, he is married to senior public servant Joanna Quilty and has a daughter, Beth.

In 2021, Pooley was a candidate for the December 2021 Council election for the City of Sydney as part of the 8-member Labor ticket led by Linda Scott.

Civic offices
Preceded by John Fowler	Mayor of South Sydney; 2002–2004	Council abolished
Preceded by Lucy Turnbull as Lord Mayor of Sydney	Commissioner of the City of Sydney; 2004; Served alongside: Turnbull, Payne	Succeeded by Clover Moore as Lord Mayor of Sydney
Preceded by Chris Harris	Deputy Lord Mayor of Sydney; 2007–2008	Succeeded by Marcelle Hoff
