= Michael McDaniel (Australian professor) =

Australian Indigenous cultural professor

Emeritus Prof. Michael McDaniel AO is a Wiradjuri man who has significantly contributed to the Australian cultural and education sectors and community over more than three decades. He currently serves as chair of the Sydney Opera House Trust.

McDaniel is the former chair of Bangarra Dance Theatre, current Special Advisor (Indigenous Priorities) at the University of Technology Sydney, and chair of the Museum of Contemporary Art's Indigenous Advisory Group.

== Early life and education ==
McDaniel grew up in the town of Forbes as a member of the Kalari Clan in the Wiradjuri Nation in Central New South Wales, Australia. McDaniel attended Darlinghurst Public School in Sydney. After being in the army between ages 16 and 20, McDaniel enrolled in Western Sydney University and graduated with the University Medal.

== Career ==
McDaniel served as Dean of Indigenous Studies at Western Sydney University, Director of Indigenous Studies at Macquarie University, Director of the Jumbunna Institute for Indigenous Education and Research, Chairman of the Australian Institute of Aboriginal and Torres Strait Islander Studies (AITSIS), and Pro Vice-Chancellor in Indigenous Leadership and Education at the University of Technology Sydney.

In January 2024, McDaniel was appointed to be the first Indigenous person to lead the custodianship of the Sydney Opera House as chair appointed to the Opera House Trust.

In 2024, the University of Technology Sydney released the winning design for the bespoke from scratch new National First Nations 250-bed College that will be located on the university's Ultimo campus and was created as part of McDaniel's vision while Pro Vice-Chancellor (Indigenous Leadership and Engagement).

McDaniel makes badhang wilay (possum-skin cloaks) to continue the practice of his ancestors.

== Awards and honours ==
- 2019 NAIDOC Scholar of the Year Award
- 2021 Officer of the Order of Australia, for his "distinguished service to Indigenous tertiary education, to the advancement of social cohesion through reconciliation, to the performing arts, and to the community"
