= John Fowler (mayor) =

Australian politician (1954–2023)

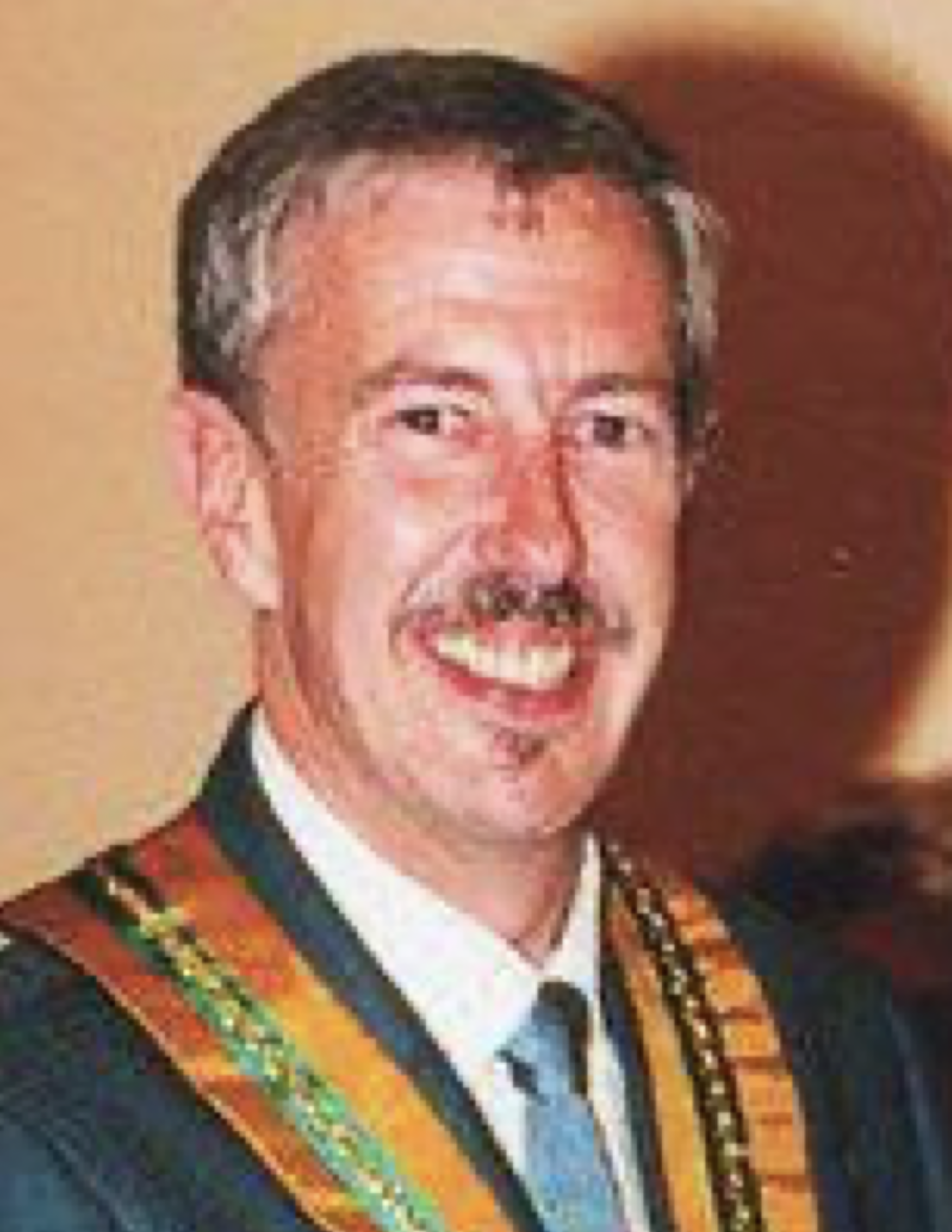

Mayor of the City of South Sydney
- In office September 2000 – September 2002
- Preceded by: Vic Smith
- Succeeded by: Tony Pooley

Councillor of the City of South Sydney
- In office September 1989 – 4 February 2004

Personal details
- Born: 16 July 1954 Sydney, Australia
- Died: 29 September 2023 (aged 69) Sydney, New South Wales, Australia
- Party: Independent
- Occupation: Politician, teacher

John William Fowler (19 July 1954 – 29 September 2023) was an Australian high school teacher and a mayor of the City of South Sydney.

== Early life and family ==
Fowler was born in Sydney and his family lived in Wallacia when he was a child. He attended Newington College (1968–1971). In 1908, his grandfather John Fowler was appointed postmaster in the town we now know as Wallacia and he became an alderman on the Mulgoa Municipal Council. His father Bernard Noel Fowler was an Independent Mayor of Penrith in 1956 and 1957. His older brother, Ross Fowler OAM, was a Liberal Mayor of the same city on three occasions: 1995–1996, 2013–2014 and 2018–2020.

== City of South Sydney ==
Fowler was an independent councillor for the City of South Sydney from 1989 until becoming the first non-Labor mayor in 2000. He served in that role until the mayoralty was taken back by the Labor Party in 2002. He was the first openly gay mayor in Sydney. In February 2001 the Sydney Gay and Lesbian Holocaust Memorial was unveiled in Green Park in Darlinghurst. At the same time the Sydney Park AIDS Memorial Grove was also unveiled by Fowler recognising the municipality as the then heart of Sydney's gay and lesbian population. In August 2003, South Sydney Council formally recognised gay and lesbian relationships. A similar register had been implemented by the Greater London Authority in United Kingdom but this recognition in South Sydney came 15 years before the plebiscite that recognised gay marriage in Australia.

== Sydney Gay and Lesbian Holocaust Memorial ==
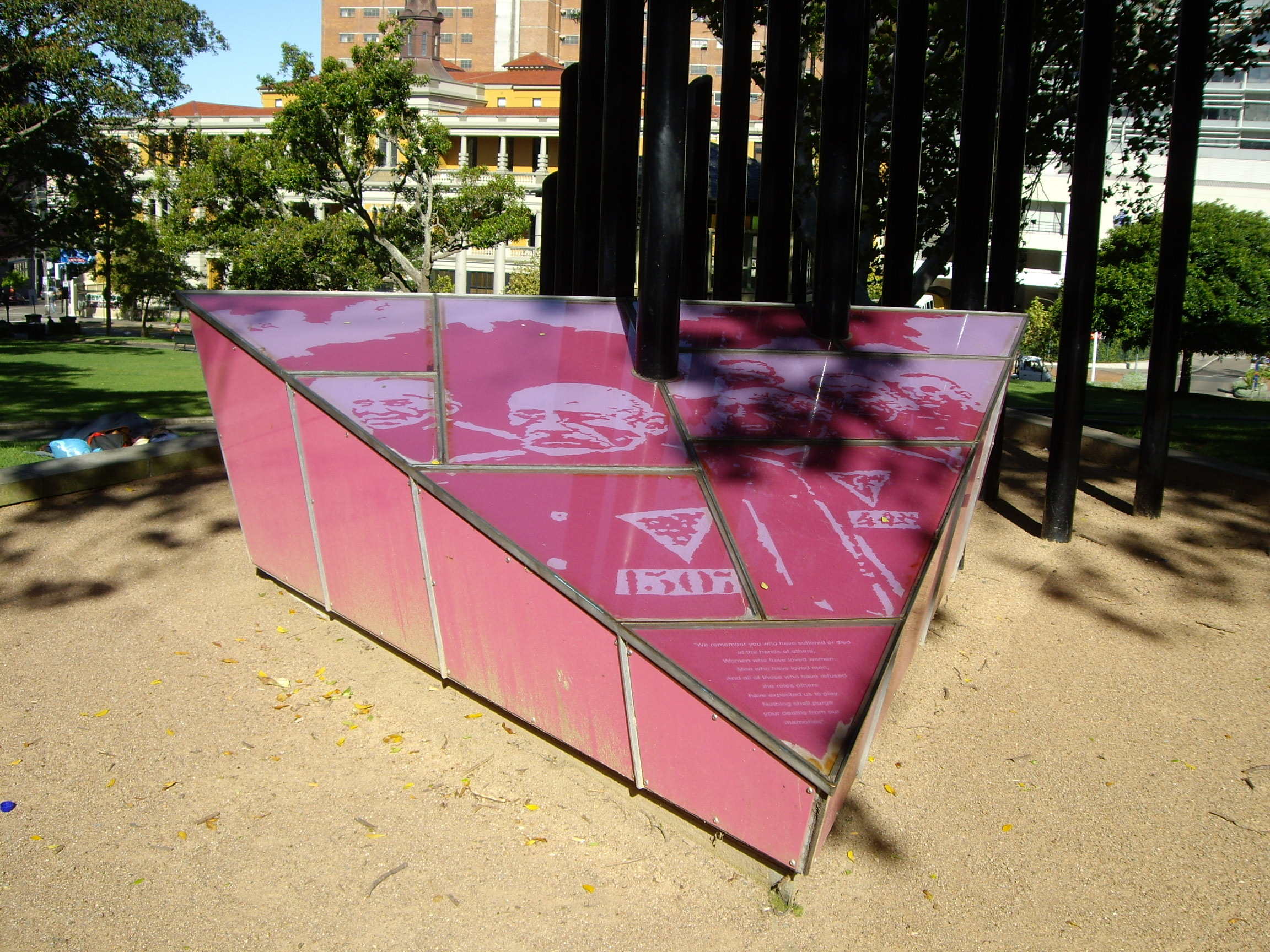

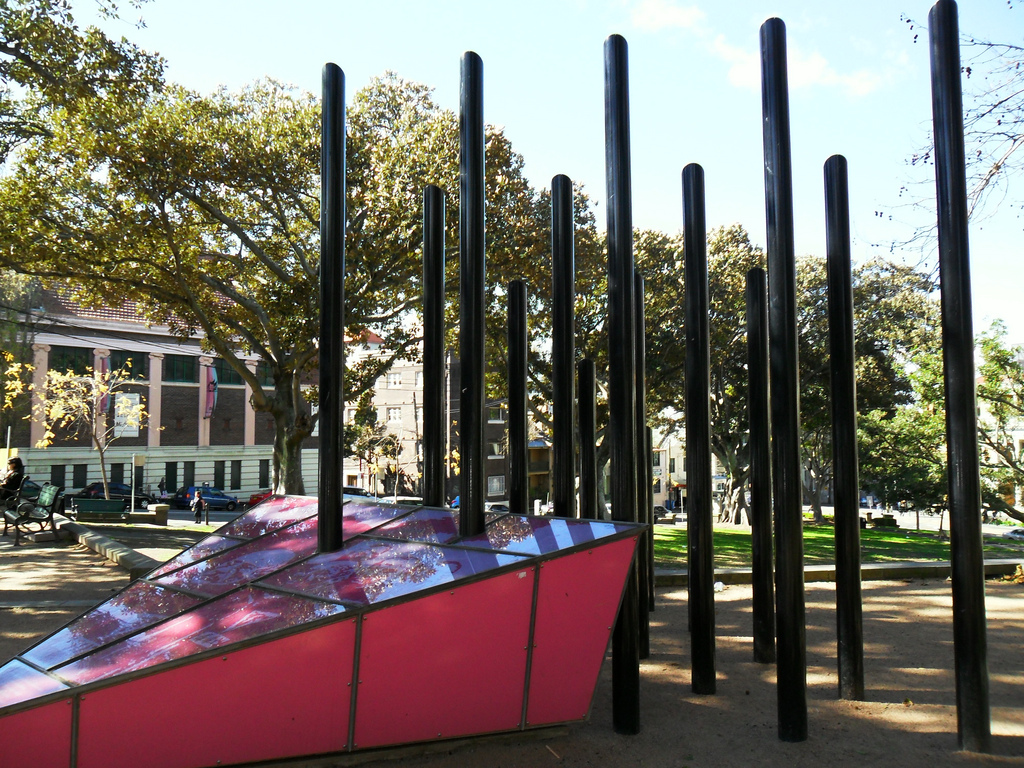

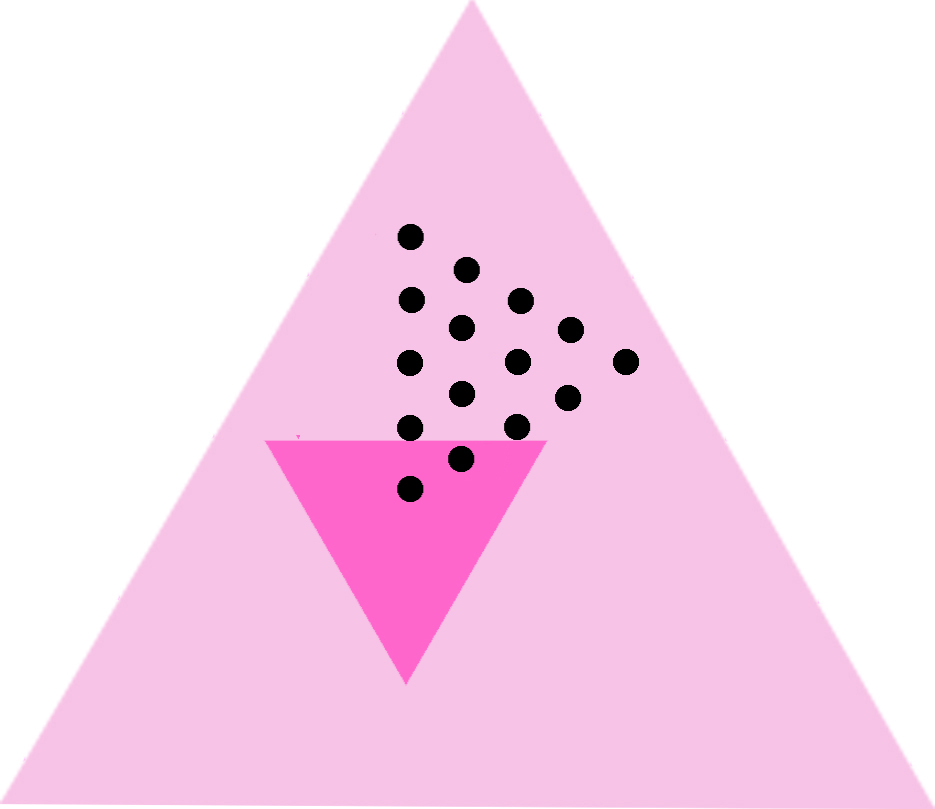

Civic offices
| Preceded by Vic Smith | Mayor of South Sydney; 2000–2002 | Succeeded by Tony Pooley |
