= 2008 Port Macquarie-Hastings Council dismissal =

Mall construction stoppage

The Glasshouse arts and entertainment centre was central to the dismissal of Port Macquarie-Hastings Council

The dismissal of the Port Macquarie-Hastings Council on 27 February 2008 marked the end of a series of events involving a project which was initiated in 2001 in the New South Wales coastal town of Port Macquarie to build a cultural and entertainment centre, known to locals as the Glasshouse. The project, initially a joint venture with the management of the neighbouring shopping centre, Port Central, was originally expected to cost the Council A$7.3 million. However, by late 2007, despite the centre not yet having opened, the costs had blown out to over A$41.7 million, with interest repayments likely to extend the council's liability to A$66 million.

On 27 July 2007, a full public inquiry was announced by the Minister for Local Government, Paul Lynch. The inquiry reported its findings in February 2008. It found that the council had failed to provide appropriate financial and project management and had lost control of the costs, that the project costs had harmed the council's ability to provide services and amenities to the community, and that the council's communications management strategy had resulted in inadequate consultation with the public and inappropriate regard to their concerns. The Minister for Local Government dismissed the council and its mayor, Rob Drew, and appointed an administrator upon receiving the inquiry's report. Drew was critical of the process throughout, maintaining that errors had been made and misinformation had been accepted as fact; however, the New South Wales Urban Task Force, a property development lobby group, believed the sacking served as a warning to other councils to stick to "core responsibilities".

The events continued to impact upon the community and the individuals involved. At a federal by-election for the normally safe National Party seat of Lyne in which Port Macquarie is located, the former mayor, who was the endorsed National candidate, failed to win against Rob Oakeshott, an independent politician, and a former state member of parliament who had been openly critical of the council throughout the drama. During the period under administration, voluntary redundancies were offered to 27 staff in order to improve the council's financial position.

In 2012, the community elected a representative council and mayor, replacing the administrator appointed in 2008.

== Background ==
On 30 March 1999, the Council met to initiate planning for a centre to house the visual and performing arts at the former Civic Centre site in the Port Macquarie central business district. It recommended a project plan be developed by 2001. On 21 August 2000 a Cultural Facilities Taskforce was created. In December 2000, the Council approached the management of the neighbouring shopping centre, Port Central, about a possible joint venture on the site, and the Council endorsed further negotiations on 28 May 2001. The joint venture was expected to cost around A$13.5 million, with the Council contributing A$7.3 million. The joint venture collapsed in August 2002 because the council was not prepared to accommodate the needs of their commercial partner to make the project viable, and decided to go it alone. The new centre became an icon building under the direction of the council's General Manager, managed by a Project Control group including the Mayor and Deputy Mayor. The costs blew out considerably by 28 June 2004, when the Council unanimously backed the project, outlays had already reached A$15–A$20 million, and by late 2007 they had reached A$41.7 million. This was due to a range of factors including, that the Council bought and demolished neighbouring shops to make the facility big enough to include meeting rooms and conference facilities, and a drain built by convicts in the 19th century, and still in remarkably good condition, was discovered by archaeologists and needed to be preserved.

== The Payne report ==
In October 2006, the NSW Department of Local Government announced it would investigate the council's financial management and would try to determine whether it properly considered the impact the added costs could have on its other functions. The investigation, which commenced on 6 November 2006, was conducted under Section 430 of the Local Government Act, 1993 (NSW), which allows the Director-General of the Department to investigate any aspect of a Council or of its work or activities. The report, delivered in May 2007 to the Minister of Local Government, concluded that the Council did not exercise due diligence and that there had been a failure to scope the project, and recommended to the Minister that a Section 740 public inquiry, which would be independent and have some of the powers and protections of a Royal Commission, be held. A Section 740 inquiry is a necessary step before a Council can be dismissed.

On 21 May 2007, Councillors Lisa Intemann and Jamie Harrison, who believed the council had exceeded its mandate and failed to consult with the community, led a public rally in Port Macquarie. The Mayor, Rob Drew, believed the centre development should be an exciting time for Port Macquarie and was critical of opposition to the project, characterising it as "slanderous accusations" and "fomenting discontent". He acknowledged the report raised concerns about the processes behind the project, but insisted the project itself was sound, saying in a press release, "I for one make no apologies that this is a multi-purpose facility which will provide for performers, community groups, which will provide for conferences, seminars and meetings, which will provide for activities never seen before in Port Macquarie." Harrison meanwhile told ABC News, "The report has said categorically that [the] Council has lied to the community about the cost of the arts centre at every opportunity it's had and it's put a gloss or a spin on it".

By June, the mayor was looking for political support to avert a full public inquiry. The National Party, whose members were dominant on the council, and MLC Melinda Pavey had been particularly critical of the actions of the Department of Local Government in the General Purpose Standing Committee. Local independent MP, Rob Oakeshott said, however, that the council should instead address the findings of the report, and stop arguing about the facts or using emotional arguments in support of it. He also cautioned against getting politicians involved, stressing that this was a formal legal process.

== The Willan inquiry ==
On 27 July 2007, the Minister for Local Government announced a Section 740 inquiry into Port Macquarie-Hastings Council and the Glasshouse project, with particular regard to aspects of financial and project management, the project's impact on the council to provide services and amenities to the community, and the openness and transparency of decisions made by the council. He appointed Frank Willan, a former administrator of Glen Innes Severn Council in 2004, as Commissioner. The mayor expressed disappointment, asserted the methodology of the earlier Section 430 investigation was faulty, and believed the council's management and decision-making processes would be vindicated.

After 18 days of public hearings and a total of 765 submissions, Willan released the inquiry report in February 2008. The report contained a number of critical findings. The key finding was that the Council and its Councillors had not been rigorous in seeking accurate information about the project, had been swayed by developers and supporters and had failed to plan and manage the project and had lost control of the "uncontrollably escalating" cost. The result was an adverse impact upon works and services in other areas of the council's operation. The Glasshouse, in the commissioner's view, would not have been able to generate the projected income once it opened. It further found that the community had been "consistently misled", that the council had improperly used its support group to campaign against critics and its "communication strategies have driven its processes". The council had therefore failed to meet its charter. Willan recommended to the Minister that all civic offices be declared vacant, an administrator be appointed, and that changes to the way Councils dealt with their own proposals be enacted.

== Sacking and aftermath ==
Upon the report's release, the Local Government Minister, Paul Lynch, concluded on 27 February 2008 that it gave him no choice but to dismiss the Council and appoint Dick Persson, who had administered Warringah Council in 2003, to serve as administrator. He said of the development, "What seems to have happened is that a reasonable community facility has been treated by the Council as an icon which must be built come hell or high water, regardless of the cost to ratepayers." He emphasised that in his view, incompetence rather than corruption was the reason for the cost blowout, which would reach A$66 million once interest repayments were accounted for. The outgoing Mayor, Rob Drew, criticised the dismissal, calling it "atrocious".

The New South Wales Urban Task Force, a property development lobby group, believed the sacking served as a warning to other Councils to stick to "core responsibilities", and in late March, the administrator adopted stricter financial measures listed in an independent review of the project.

In September and October 2008, by-elections in the Port Macquarie area at both federal and state level gave a new forum to some of the players in the controversy. When the member for the federal seat of Lyne, Mark Vaile, retired from politics on 30 July 2008, Oakeshott and Drew, the latter standing as the endorsed National Party candidate, emerged as the major candidates in the resulting by-election on 6 September. With the Glasshouse as a major issue, Oakeshott won 63.80% of the primary vote to Drew's 22.88%, with a further 10.07% coming to Oakeshott via preferences. In Oakeshott's old state seat of Port Macquarie, former Councillors Jamie Harrison and Lisa Intemann ran as independents, between them attracting 15.8% of the vote, whilst former Oakeshott staffer Peter Besseling went on to win the election against the endorsed National candidate.

On 17 December 2008, the council announced that some staff would be offered voluntary redundancies as part of a strategy to address the $7.1 million deficit it faced for the 2008–2009 financial year without increasing Council rates. The following day, it set a deadline of 19 January 2009 and clarified that 27 positions were being made redundant, while 29 vacancies would not be filled. The redundancies proceeded as planned, although forced redundancies down the track were not ruled out.

On 20 January 2009, administrator Dick Persson announced his decision to step down at the end of the month, largely due to the demands of being away from his Sydney home for several days a week. He described the Glasshouse project as a "wrong decision" by the council, attributing it to "woolly thinking with the best of intentions from people not experienced with planning and delivering major capital works." He was replaced in the role by Garry Payne, head of the Department of Local Government.

On 8 September 2012, the community elected a mayor and councillors, to form a new Port Macquarie-Hastings Council. Former State member for Port Macquarie, Peter Besseling, was elected mayor and Lisa Intemann, the only member of the dismissed council to contest the 2012 election, was re-elected as councillor.
