= Woronora Memorial Park =

Cemetery in Sydney, Australia

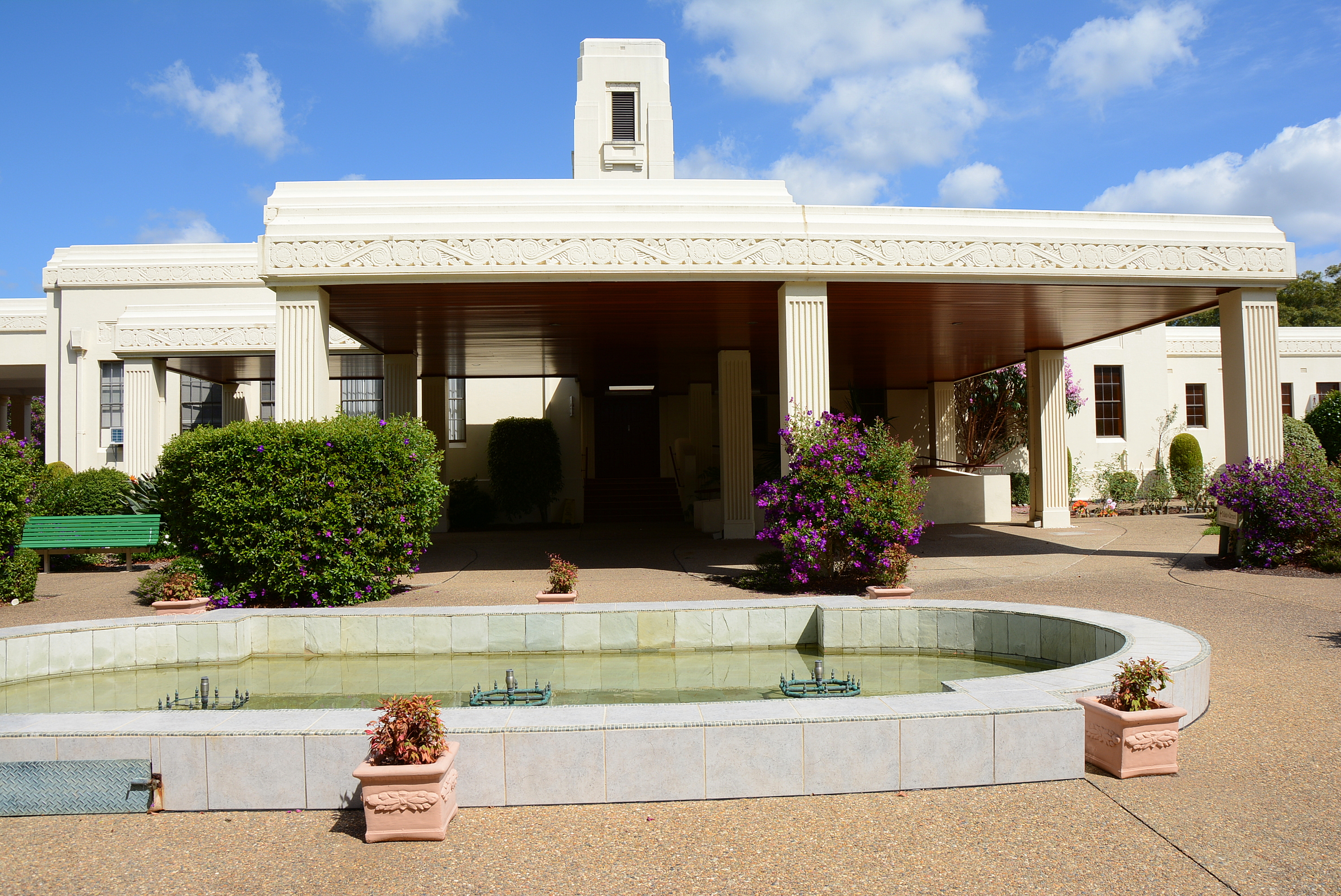
- The Art Deco crematorium, built in 1934.
- Interactive map of Woronora Memorial Park

Details
- Established: 1895
- Location: Woronora, New South Wales
- Country: Australia
- Coordinates: 34°01′58″S 151°03′07″E
- Type: Public
- Owned by: Government of New South Wales
- Size: 112.25 acres (45.43 ha)
- No. of interments: 900,000 (buried); 137,000 (cremated)
- Website: Woronora Memorial Park

Woronora Memorial Park (often referred to as Woronora Cemetery) is a cemetery in Woronora, Sydney, Australia.

== History ==
Woronora Cemetery was established in 1895 with the first burial on 2 April 1895. In 1902 the Devonshire Street Cemetery was closed to make way for Central railway station and some graves were relocated to Woronora. The first cremation occurred in April 1934.

The cemetery is managed by Southern Metropolitan Cemeteries NSW (officially "Southern Metropolitan Cemeteries Land Manager"), consisting of Woronora Memorial Park and Eastern Suburbs Memorial Park, which replaced the Woronora Memorial Park Trust upon gazettal on 3 August 2012.

== Crematorium ==
The original crematorium building, incorporating two chapels and a dual-furnace crematory, was completed in 1934 in the Inter-war Art Deco style by architect Louis Leighton Robertson of Louis S. Robertson & Son, architects, and built by Norman R. Smith, builder of Bexley. Robertson also designed crematoriums in a similar style at Matraville (1938), Kembla Grange (1955), and Beresfield (1936). The crematorium was officially opened on 21 April 1934 by the Colonial Secretary, Frank Chaffey.

In 2018, the 1934 crematorium was decommissioned and a new crematorium able to accommodate the increasing demand for cremations was completed to a design by architects Gardner Wetherill Associates.

== Transport ==
A 750-metre railway line opened on 28 July 1900 branching off the Illawarra railway line at Sutherland terminating at Woronora Cemetery railway station. It closed on 23 May 1947.

== Notable people ==
Notable people interred at Woronora Cemetery include:

- Carl Akhurst, politician
- Henry Bachtold, soldier and railway engineer
- Harry Bath, rugby league
- Tiger Black, rugby league
- Brian Clay, rugby league
- William Matthew Currey, Victoria Cross
- Thomas Dunlea, Catholic priest
- John Patrick Hamilton, Victoria Cross recipient
- Stanley Haviland, public servant
- Frank Jenner, evangelist
- Tom Killiby, rugby league
- Elias C. Laycock, rower
- John Harold Mostyn, rugby league
- Norman Oakes, public servant
- John Radecki, master stained glass artist
- Blair Wark, Victoria Cross recipient
- Victoria Shaw, film and television actress
