= Chris Harris (New South Wales politician) =

New South Wales politician

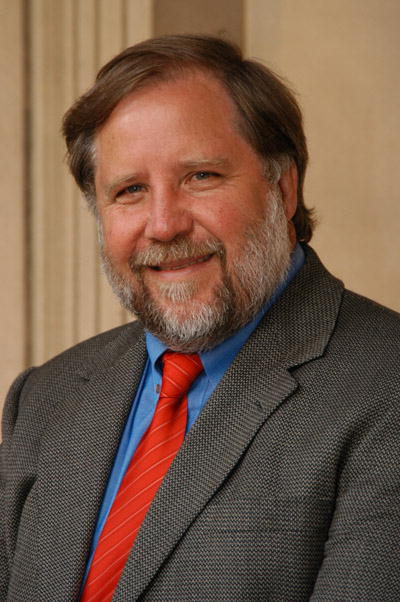

Deputy Lord Mayor of Sydney
- In office 18 September 2006 – 17 September 2007
- Lord Mayor: Clover Moore
- Preceded by: Verity Firth
- Succeeded by: Tony Pooley

Councillor of the City of Sydney
- In office 27 March 2004 – 8 September 2012

Personal details
- Born: 28 June 1951 (age 75) Wentworthville, New South Wales, Australia
- Party: Greens (since 1997)

Chris Harris (born 28 June 1951) is an Australian former politician who served as the first Greens Councillor of the City of Sydney, and for a single term as the Deputy Lord Mayor of Sydney from 2006 to 2007.

== Early life and career ==
Christopher David Harris was born in Wentworthville on 28 June 1951 and schooled at Parramatta Marist High School. He attended the University of New South Wales and graduated with Bachelor of Commerce in the 1970s and a Bachelor of Laws in 2005. He married Kathy in 1972 and together they raised two daughters.

Harris worked in the Commonwealth Bank then moved on to a position in research in the Reserve Bank. After moving into small business, his work focused on campaigns, communications, conflict resolution, and project coordination.

== Political career ==
In 2004, Harris was preselected by his party prior to the March 2004 local government election, and was the first Greens Councillor to be elected to the City of Sydney. He served as Deputy Lord Mayor (2006-2007) and in 2008 was re-elected along with a second Greens Councillor, Irene Doutney. Early in his constituency, he took residence in a Moreton Bay Fig tree as a protest against planned removal.

Harris was an opponent of the Sydney cross-city tunnel which opened in 2005. In March 2007, he was involved in a scuffle with Liberal senator Bill Heffernan while handing out how-to-vote cards for the NSW State Election.

In June 2007, Harris fought against the redevelopment of the Carlton United Brewery site in Chippendale, taking the then Minister for Planning to the Land and Environment Court. In August 2007, Harris heavily opposed the security measures put in place for the hosting of the Asia-Pacific Economic Cooperation conference. Harris was the unsuccessful Greens candidate in the 2012 Sydney by-election, and retired from council at the September 2012 local government elections.

Harris was a long time Treasurer of the NSW Greens but quit the position in 2016, criticising the party as acting like a major bank trying "to shaft their customers".

In 2019, Harris threatened legal action in an attempt to change the party’s upper house ticket just weeks before the state election. This followed a messy factional brawl within the Greens where the left faction of the party secured the top two positions on the party’s ticket.

Civic offices
Preceded by Verity Firth	Deputy Lord Mayor of Sydney; 2006 – 2007	Succeeded by Tony Pooley
