= Sydney Opera House Trust =

Government agency operating the Sydney Opera House

Agency overview
- Formed: 2 December 1954 (Committee); 14 March 1961 (Trust)
- Employees: FTE (Note: Full-Time Equivalent) 667
- Annual budget: $20.164 million
- Minister responsible: John Graham, Minister for the Arts
- Agency executives: Michael McDaniel, Chair; Kya Blondin, Acting Chief Executive Officer
- Parent department: Create NSW
- Child Agency: Sydney Opera House
- Key document: Sydney Opera House Trust Act 1961 (NSW)
- Website: Sydney Opera House Trust

The Sydney Opera House Trust operates and maintains the Sydney Opera House in Sydney for the Government of New South Wales in Australia.

== Role ==
The Trust operates as one of the State's premier cultural institutions within the Create NSW portfolio. It is constituted as a body corporate under the Sydney Opera House Trust Act 1961. It has 10 members appointed by the Governor of New South Wales on the nomination of the Minister for the Arts. The Trustees must include at least two persons who have knowledge of or experience in the performing arts. A Trustee holds office for three years and is eligible for reappointment for no more than three consecutive terms.

The Trust's objectives are:

- To administer, care for, control, manage, staff and maintain the Sydney Opera House building and site
- To manage and administer the site as an arts centre and meeting place
- To promote artistic taste and achievement in all branches of the performing arts
- To foster scientific research into and to encourage the development of new forms of entertainment and presentation.

The trust is responsible for the oversight and appointment of the Sydney Opera House Executive Team, which "works in partnership with the Trust and is responsible for developing, implementing and monitoring the organisational strategy", and includes portfolio directors under the Chief Executive Officer.

== History ==
The Sydney Opera House Trust was established by the Sydney Opera House Trust Act 1961, which came into effect from 14 March 1961, replacing the Sydney Opera House Executive Committee, which since 1954 had investigated the location and design competition. The first trust appointed under the 1961 act comprised 17 trustees: the Premier Bob Heffron or the Minister for Public Works (Norm Ryan; as president), the Lord Mayor of Sydney (Harry Jensen; as vice-president), and 15 'nominated trustees': Stanley Haviland CBE (chairman), Edward William Adams, Clarence Henry Woodward Arthy, Professor Henry Ingham Ashworth, Doris Fitton OBE, John Glass CBE, Sir Bernard Heinze, Neil Hutchison, Hon. James Denis Kenny, Erik Langker OBE, Dr Nicolai Malko, Charles Moses CBE, Dr Cobden Parkes CBE, Dr Lloyd Maxwell Ross, and Dr Harold Wyndham.

Louise Herron was CEO of the Sydney Opera House from 2012 until August 2026. Following Herron's departure, Kya Blondin, Executive Director, People & Government was named as acting CEO.

== Membership ==
The Trust consists of ten members in total, including the Chair. The current members of the Trust are:

Chair	Term begins	Term ends
Professor Michael McDaniel AO	1 January 2024	31 December 2026
Trustee	Term begins	Term ends
David Campbell OAM	1 January 2022	31 December 2027
Dylan Goh	14 October 2025	14 October 2028
Tarun Gupta	6 May 2026	31 December 2028
Susan Lloyd-Hurwitz AM	1 January 2023	31 December 2028
Sara Mansour	1 January 2024	31 December 2026
Zareh Nalbandian	1 July 2024	31 December 2026
Melanie Silva	1 July 2024	31 December 2026
Allan Vidor AM	1 January 2023	31 December 2028
Sara Watts	1 January 2023	31 December 2028

== Chairs ==
#	Chair	Term	Time in office	Notes
Sydney Opera House Committee/Executive Committee
1	Stanley Haviland CBE	2 December 1954 – 14 March 1961	6 years, 102 days	
Sydney Opera House Trust
–	Stanley Haviland CBE	14 March 1961 – 1 May 1969	8 years, 48 days	
2	Sir Philip Baxter KBE, CMG	1 May 1969 – 7 May 1975	6 years, 6 days	
3	Frederick Stanley Buckley OBE	7 May 1975 – 30 April 1977	1 year, 358 days	
4	Sir Robert Norman	1 May 1977 – 30 April 1981	3 years, 364 days	
5	David Greenberg Block AC	1 May 1981 – 30 April 1989	7 years, 364 days	
6	Elizabeth Butcher AM	1 May 1989 – 31 December 1995	6 years, 244 days	
7	Joseph Skrzynski AO	1 January 1996 – 31 December 2004	8 years, 365 days	
8	Kim Williams AM	1 January 2005 – 4 October 2013	8 years, 276 days	
9	John Symond AM	4 October 2013 – 31 December 2014	1 year, 88 days	
–	Helen Coonan (acting)	1 January 2015 – 22 July 2015	202 days	
10	Nicholas Moore	22 July 2015 – 31 December 2020	5 years, 162 days	
11	Lucy Turnbull AO	1 January 2021 – 31 December 2023	2 years, 364 days	
12	Professor Michael McDaniel AO	1 January 2024 – 31 December 2026	2 years, 317 days	

== Chief executives ==
#	General Manager	Term	Time in office	Notes
1	Stuart Bacon	April 1968 – 23 March 1973	4 years, 356 days	
2	Frank Barnes	23 March 1973 – 1 March 1979	5 years, 343 days	
3	Lloyd Martin	1 March 1979 – 17 March 1997	18 years, 16 days	
#	Chief Executive Officer	Term	Time in office	Notes
4	Tim Jacobs	17 March 1997 – 15 May 1998	1 year, 59 days	
5	Michael Lynch AO, CBE	August 1998 – July 2002	3 years, 334 days	
–	Judith Isherwood (acting)	July 2002 – September 2002	62 days	
6	Dr Norman Gillespie	September 2002 – September 2007	5 years, 0 days	
7	Richard Evans	September 2007 – 24 February 2012	4 years, 176 days	
–	Jonathan Bielski (acting)	24 February 2012 – 6 August 2012	164 days	
8	Louise Herron AM	6 August 2012 – 6 August 2026	14 years, 0 days	
—	Kya Blondin (acting)	6 August 2026 – present	100 days	
