= South Sydney City Council =

Former local government area in New South Wales, Australia

City of South Sydney
- Local government area
- Logo of the City of South Sydney
- Country: Australia
- State: New South Wales
- Region: Inner City/Inner West
- Established: 1 January 1968; 1 January 1989
- Abolished: 1 January 1982; 6 February 2004
- Council seat: Erskineville Town Hall

Population
  - Total: 82,960 (1996 census)
- Website: City of South Sydney

The South Sydney City Council was a local government area covering the inner-eastern and inner-Southern Sydney suburbs of Sydney. It was forcibly merged with the Sydney City Council by the Government of New South Wales in 2004. The council chambers were located in the Erskineville Town Hall, with the administrative offices at Joynton Avenue in Zetland. The administrative offices were relocated to the TNT Towers in Redfern in 2001.

== History ==
=== First creation, 1968–1981 ===
The forerunner of the City of South Sydney was the Northcott Municipal Council (named after the late Governor Sir John Northcott, who served from 1946 to 1957 as the first Australian Governor of NSW), which was created on 1 January 1968 when the City of Sydney boundaries were changed. Newtown, Darlington, Erskineville, Alexandria, Waterloo and Redfern were combined to form the new council. The council was renamed the South Sydney Municipal Council on 1 December 1968, which was itself abolished on 1 January 1982 and all of these areas were returned to the City of Sydney.

=== Second creation, 1989–2004 ===
In the late 1980s, the Government of New South Wales perceived that the Sydney City Council was insufficiently committed to some major infrastructural projects such as the monorail and the redevelopment of Darling Harbour. In March 1987 the government dismissed the council of the City of Sydney and replaced it with commissioners who administered the city until 31 December 1988. A special inquiry and subsequent report (the Goran Report) advocated separating the Sydney central business district (CBD) from surrounding suburbs and replacing municipal government in the CBD with a special commission to ensure it was governed as a financial, commercial and tourist centre. In 1989, a new South Sydney City Council was created with the pre-1982 areas but also including most of Surry Hills and the eastern side of the City from The Domain to Boundary Road, including Woolloomooloo and Kings Cross, Potts Point and Elizabeth Bay which had not previously been a part of South Sydney.

The South Sydney City Council was established on 1 January 1989 under the City of Sydney Act 1988 with nine aldermen (known as Councillors from 1993) divided across three wards: North, South and East wards. The first election for the City of South Sydney was held on 3 December 1988.

In 2002, parts of the City of South Sydney and Leichhardt were proposed to be merged with the City of Sydney. In 2003, Potts Point, Elizabeth Bay, Kings Cross, Darlinghurst, Chippendale, Ultimo and parts of Rushcutters Bay, Camperdown and Darlington were transferred from South Sydney to the City of Sydney. As the financial viability of the residual City of South Sydney was under threat as a result, the City of Sydney and the City of South Sydney were combined by proclamation on 6 February 2004. The 2003 merger was perceived as an attempt to bring more working class Labor Party voters into the City of Sydney.

== Council ==
=== Final composition ===
South Sydney City Council was composed of three wards, each electing three councillors each. The position of mayor was elected by councillors. The final election was held on 1 July 2000, and the makeup of the council following the election was as follows:

Party	Councillors
Labor Party	4
South Sydney Community Independents	2
Liberal Party	1
The Greens	1
Australian Democrats	1
Total	9

On 11 April 2003, South Ward councillor Peter Furness left the Australian Democrats to join the Labor Party. Furness was the first member of the Democrats elected to South Sydney City Council, and it was his vote that prevented Labor from holding the mayoralty from 2000 until 2002.

The final council, as of April 2003, was:

Ward	Councillor	Party	Notes
Central Ward	John Fowler	Community Independents	Mayor (2000–2002)
Central Ward	Christine Harcourt	Labor	
Central Ward	Tony Pooley	Labor	
North Ward	Greg Shaw	Labor	
North Ward	Shayne Mallard	Liberal	
North Ward	Amanda Lennon	Greens	
South Ward	John Bush	Community Independents	
South Ward	Jill Lay	Labor	
South Ward	Peter Furness	Labor	Deputy Mayor (2002–2003)

== Mayors ==
=== Northcott/South Sydney Municipality, 1968–1982 ===
Mayor	Party	Term	Notes
Bill Hartup	Labor	January 1968 – 31 December 1981	

=== City of South Sydney, 1989–2004 ===
Mayor	Party	Term	Notes
Vic Smith	Labor	1 January 1989 – July 2000	
John Fowler	Community Independents	July 2000 – 2 September 2002	
Tony Pooley	Labor	2 September 2002 – 5 February 2004	
