= Office of Local Government (New South Wales) =

Government agency

New South Wales Office of Local Government

Agency overview
- Formed: 1993
- Preceding agency: Office of Local Government
- Dissolved: 1 July 2019
- Superseding agency: Department of Planning, Industry and Environment
- Jurisdiction: New South Wales
- Headquarters: Nowra
- Minister responsible: Minister for Local Government
- Agency executive: Mr Tim Hurst, Acting Chief Executive, Local Government
- Parent agency: Department of Planning, Industry and Environment
- Key document: Local Government Act, 1993 (NSW)
- Website: http://www.olg.nsw.gov.au

The New South Wales Office of Local Government, a former agency from 1993 until 2019 of the Department of Planning and Environment in the Government of New South Wales, was responsible for administering legislation in relation to local government areas in New South Wales.

Up until its abolition in April 2019, the office was led by its Acting Chief Executive, Mr Tim Hurst, who reported to the Minister for Local Government. The office and its antecedent agency was established in 1993, pursuant to the Local Government Act, 1993 (NSW).

Following the 2019 state election the office was abolished and its functions assumed by the newly formed Department of Planning, Industry and Environment with effect from 1 July 2019.

== Divisional responsibilities ==
The role of the office included preparing legislation, providing advice and information to the State Government and local councils, regulating financial management and monitoring financial reporting practices of councils, and improving local government performance through provision of standards and guidelines and conducting reviews and investigations (often called Section 430 investigations).

As part of a drive to locate government offices in regional areas, the office's head office was in the regional town of Nowra on the South Coast, but an office in Castlereagh Street in Sydney CBD also provides Divisional services.

== See also ==
- Local government areas of New South Wales
- List of ministers for local government in the state of New South Wales
