= Members of the New South Wales Legislative Council, 1958–1961 =

Members of the New South Wales Legislative Council between 1958 and 1961 were indirectly elected by a joint sitting of the New South Wales Parliament, with 15 members elected every three years. The most recent election was on 26 November 1957, with the term of new members commencing on 23 April 1958. The President was William Dickson.

Name	Party	End term	Years in office
Harold Ahern	Liberal	1961	1949–1973
Alexander Armstrong	Country	1964	1952–1969
George Bassett	Country	1964	1932–1964
Colin Begg	Liberal	1961	1955–1964
Arthur Bridges	Liberal	1970	1946–1968
Harry Budd	Country	1970	1946–1978
Cedric Cahill	Labor	1961	1954–1973
Cyril Cahill	Labor / Independent Labor (Note: In December 1959, 8 Labor members, Cyril Cahill, Donald Cochrane, Thomas Gleeson, Patrick Grace, Charles Hackett, John Kenny, Anne Press and Gerald Rygate, were expelled from the party for voting against the abolition of the Legislative Council. They constituted themselves, at first informally, as the Independent Labor Group.)	1961	1949–1977
John Carter	Country	1967	1955–1968
Hector Clayton	Independent	1961	1937–1973
Donald Cochrane	Labor / Independent Labor	1964	1950–1964
Harry Cockerill (Note: Robert Savage (Labor) died on 2 July 1959. Harry Cockerill (Labor) was elected to replace him on 10 September 1959.)	Labor	1961	1959–1973
Col Colborne	Labor	1961	1949–1973
William Coulter	Labor	1967	1947–1978
Chris Dalton	Labor	1970	1943–1970
Robert Day	Labor	1967	1953–1967
William Dickson	Labor	1964	1925–1934, 1940–1966
Tom Dougherty	Labor	1967	1957–1961
Reg Downing	Labor	1964	1940–1972
Robert Erskine	Labor	1961	1949–1973
Stanley Eskell	Liberal	1970	1958–1978
Otway Falkiner	Country	1970	1946–1978
Herbert FitzSimons	Liberal / Country (Note: On 30 September 1959, 3 Liberal members, Herbert FitzSimons, Graham Pratten and Leon Snider, together with Asher Joel (Independent), joined the Country Party, citing its uncompromising opposition to abolition of the Legislative Council.)	1970	1955–1970
Harry Gardiner (Note: Gerald Rygate (Independent Labor) died on 8 June 1960. Harry Gardiner (Independent Labor) was elected to replace him on 15 September 1960.)	Independent Labor	1967	1960–1974
Thomas Gleeson	Labor / Independent Labor	1970	1946–1975
Patrick Grace	Labor / Independent Labor	1964	1952–1964
James Graves	Labor	1961	1934–1961
Charles Hackett	Labor / Independent Labor	1964	1943–1964
Herbert Henley	Country	1964	1937–1964
Frederick Hewitt	Liberal	1967	1955–1976
Reginald Jackson	Labor	1970	1950–1969
Asher Joel	Independent / Country	1970	1958–1978
Jim Kenny	Labor	1964	1948–1967
John Kenny	Labor / Independent Labor	1970	1955–1970
Robert King (Note: Robert King (Labor) died on 27 February 1960. Michael Quinn (Labor) was elected to replace him on 29 March 1960, whereupon he immediately resigned from the Labor Party to join the Independent Labor Group.)	Labor	1970	1931–1960
Christopher Love	Labor	1961	1955–1970
Robert Mahony (Note: Robert Mahony (Labor) died on 8 February 1961. A by-election was not held this term, so the vacancy carried over to the next parliament.)	Labor	1967	1921–1961
Jim Maloney	Labor	1967	1941–1972
Gertrude Melville (Note: Gertrude Melville (Labor) died on 21 August 1959. Anne Press (Labor) was elected to replace her on 22 October 1959.)	Labor	1970	1952–1959
William Murray	Labor	1964	1952–1976
George Neilly (Note: George Neilly (Labor) resigned on 16 February 1959. William Peters (Labor) was elected to replace him on 19 May 1959.)	Labor	1970	1954–1959
Ernest O'Dea	Labor	1967	1943–1967
John Paterson	Liberal	1970	1958–1970
William Peters	Labor	1970	1959–1978
Thomas Playfair	Liberal	1967	1927–1966
Graham Pratten	Liberal / Country	1964	1937–1976
Anne Press	Labor / Independent Labor	1970	1959–1978
Michael Quinn	Independent Labor	1970	1960–1965
Edna Roper	Labor	1970	1958–1978
Gerald Rygate	Labor / Independent Labor	1967	1952–1960
Leicester Saddington	Liberal	1964	1952–1962
Robert Savage	Labor	1961	1931–1934, 1943–1959
Leon Snider	Liberal / Country	1967	1943–1965
Lloyd Sommerlad	Country	1967	1955–1967
Frank Spicer	Country	1961	1925–1973
Thomas Steele	Country	1961	1934–1961
Gavin Sutherland	Labor	1961	1956–1970
Norman Thom	Labor	1967	1950–1978
Henry Thompson	Liberal	1964	1940–1964
William Walmsley	Country	1964	1952–1964
Edward Warren	Liberal	1967	1955–1978
John Weir	Labor	1961	1949–1973
Samuel Williams	Labor	1964	1943–1962
Robert Wilson	Country	1961	1949–1961
Ernest Wright	Labor	1967	1943–1973

== See also ==
- Third Cahill ministry
- Fourth Cahill ministry
