= Members of the New South Wales Legislative Council, 1961–1964 =

Members of the New South Wales Legislative Council between 1961 and 1964 were indirectly elected by a joint sitting of the New South Wales Parliament, with 15 members elected every three years. The most recent election was on 16 March 1961, with the term of new members commencing on 23 April 1961. The President was William Dickson.

Name	Party	End term	Years in office
Harold Ahern	Liberal	1973	1949–1973
Alexander Alam (Note: Ian Sinclair (Country) resigned on 24 October 1963 to contest the Australian House of Representatives. Alexander Alam (Labor) was elected as his replacement on 19 November 1963.)	Labor	1973	1925–1958, 1963–1973
Alexander Armstrong	Country	1964	1952–1969
George Bassett	Country	1964	1932–1964
Colin Begg (Note: Colin Begg (Liberal) resigned in April 1964, creating a casual vacancy that was carried through to the next parliament.)	Liberal	1973	1955–1964
Arthur Bridges	Liberal	1970	1946–1968
Roger de Bryon-Faes	Liberal	1973	1961–1981
Harry Budd	Country	1970	1946–1978
Cedric Cahill	Labor	1973	1954–1973
Cyril Cahill	Independent Labor	1973	1949–1977
John Carter	Country	1967	1955–1968
Hector Clayton	Liberal	1973	1937–1973
Donald Cochrane	Independent Labor	1964	1950–1964
Harry Cockerill	Labor	1973	1959–1973
Col Colborne	Labor	1973	1949–1973
William Coulter	Labor	1967	1947–1978
Chris Dalton	Labor	1970	1943–1970
Robert Day	Labor	1967	1953–1967
William Dickson	Labor	1964	1925–1934, 1940–1966
Tom Dougherty (Note: Robert Mahony (Labor) died on 8 February 1961, before this parliament began. Labor MLC Tom Dougherty resigned on 1 May 1961. Walter Geraghty (Labor) and Amelia Rygate (Independent Labor) were elected as their replacements on 7 September 1961.)	Labor	1967	1957–1961
Reg Downing	Labor	1964	1940–1972
Robert Erskine	Labor	1973	1949–1973
Stanley Eskell	Liberal	1970	1958–1978
Otway Falkiner	Country	1970	1946–1978
Herbert FitzSimons	Country	1970	1955–1970
John Fuller	Country	1973	1961–1978
Eileen Furley (Note: Leicester Saddington (Liberal) died on 26 September 1962. Samuel Williams (Labor) died on 12 October 1962. Eileen Furley (Liberal) and Ralph Marsh (Labor) were elected as their replacements on 14 November 1962.)	Liberal	1964	1962–1976
Harry Gardiner	Independent Labor	1967	1960–1974
Walter Geraghty	Labor	1967	1961–1978
Thomas Gleeson	Independent Labor	1970	1946–1975
Patrick Grace	Independent Labor	1964	1952–1964
Charles Hackett	Independent Labor	1964	1943–1964
Herbert Henley	Country	1964	1937–1964
Frederick Hewitt	Liberal	1967	1955–1976
Reginald Jackson	Labor	1970	1950–1969
Asher Joel	Country	1970	1958–1978
Jim Kenny	Labor	1964	1948–1967
John Kenny	Independent Labor	1970	1955–1970
Christopher Love	Labor	1973	1955–1970
Jim Maloney	Labor	1967	1941–1972
Ralph Marsh	Labor	1964	1962–1976
William Murray	Labor	1964	1952–1976
Ernest O'Dea	Labor	1967	1943–1967
John Paterson	Liberal	1970	1958–1970
William Peters	Labor	1970	1959–1978
Thomas Playfair	Liberal	1967	1927–1966
Graham Pratten	Country	1964	1937–1976
Anne Press	Independent Labor	1970	1959–1978
Michael Quinn	Independent Labor	1970	1960–1965
Edna Roper	Labor	1970	1958–1978
Amelia Rygate	Independent Labor	1967	1961–1978
Leicester Saddington	Liberal	1964	1952–1962
Ian Sinclair	Country	1973	1961–1963
Leon Snider	Country	1967	1943–1965
Lloyd Sommerlad	Country	1967	1955–1967
Frank Spicer	Country	1973	1925–1973
Gavin Sutherland	Labor	1973	1956–1970
Norman Thom	Labor	1967	1950–1978
Henry Thompson (Note: Henry Thompson (Liberal) died on 21 March 1964, creating a casual vacancy that was carried through to the next parliament.)	Liberal	1964	1940–1964
William Walmsley	Country	1964	1952–1964
Sir Edward Warren	Liberal	1967	1955–1978
John Weir	Labor	1973	1949–1973
Samuel Williams	Labor	1964	1943–1962
Ernest Wright	Labor	1967	1943–1973

== See also ==
- Fourth Cahill ministry
- First Heffron ministry
- Second Heffron ministry
