= Members of the New South Wales Legislative Council, 1964–1967 =

Members of the New South Wales Legislative Council between 1964 and 1967 were indirectly elected by a joint sitting of the New South Wales Parliament, with 15 members elected every three years. The most recent election was on 21 November 1963, with the term of new members commencing on 23 April 1964. The President was William Dickson until his death in May 1966 and then Harry Budd.

Name	Party	End term	Years in office
Harold Ahern	Liberal	1973	1949–1973
Alexander Alam	Labor	1973	1925–1958, 1963–1973
Alexander Armstrong	Country	1976	1952–1969
Evelyn Barron	Labor	1976	1964–1976
Norman Boland (Note: William Dickson (Labor) died on 22 May 1966. George Ford (Labor) died on 30 July 1966. Norman Boland (Independent Labor) and Fred Bowen (Labor) were elected as their replacements on 19 August 1966.)	Independent Labor	1976	1966–1970
Fred Bowen	Labor	1976	1966–1976
Arthur Bridges	Liberal	1970	1946–1968
Roger de Bryon-Faes	Liberal	1973	1961–1981
Harry Budd	Country	1970	1946–1978
Cedric Cahill	Labor	1973	1954–1973
Cyril Cahill	Independent Labor	1973	1949–1977
Jim Cahill (Note: Michael Quinn (Independent Labor) died on 12 July 1965. Jim Cahill (Labor) was elected as his replacement on 9 September 1965.)	Labor	1970	1965–1978
John Carter	Country	1967	1955–1968
Hector Clayton	Liberal	1973	1937–1973
Harry Cockerill	Labor	1973	1959–1973
Col Colborne	Labor	1973	1949–1973
William Coulter	Labor	1967	1947–1978
Chris Dalton	Labor	1970	1943–1970
Robert Day	Labor	1967	1953–1967
William Dickson	Labor	1976	1925–1934, 1940–1966
Reg Downing	Labor	1976	1940–1972
Robert Erskine	Labor	1973	1949–1973
Stanley Eskell	Liberal	1970	1958–1978
Otway Falkiner	Country	1970	1946–1978
Herbert FitzSimons	Country	1970	1955–1970
George Ford	Labor	1976	1964–1966
John Fuller	Country	1973	1961–1978
Eileen Furley	Liberal	1976	1962–1976
Harry Gardiner	Independent Labor	1967	1960–1974
Walter Geraghty	Labor	1967	1961–1978
Thomas Gleeson	Independent Labor	1970	1946–1975
Trevor Gordon (Note: Henry Thompson (Liberal) had been re-elected in November 1963 however he died on 21 March 1964, before the beginning of this term. Trevor Gordon (Labor) was elected as his replacement on 21 May 1964.)	Labor	1976	1964–1976
Frederick Hewitt	Liberal	1967	1955–1976
Reginald Jackson	Labor	1970	1950–1969
Asher Joel	Country	1970	1958–1978
Geoffrey Keighley (Note: Leon Snider (Country) died on 9 August 1965. Geoffrey Keighley (Country) was elected as his replacement on 14 October 1965.)	Country	1967	1965–1978
Jim Kenny	Labor	1976	1948–1967
John Kenny	Independent Labor	1970	1955–1970
Christopher Love	Labor	1973	1955–1970
Jim Maloney	Labor	1967	1941–1972
Ralph Marsh	Labor	1976	1962–1976
John McIntosh	Country	1976	1964–1971
Thomas McKay (Note: Thomas Playfair (Liberal) died on 9 August 1966. Thomas McKay (Liberal) was elected as his replacement on 1 September 1966.)	Liberal	1967	1966–1978
Herb McPherson (Note: Colin Begg (Liberal) resigned in April 1964 before the beginning of this term. Herb McPherson (Labor) was elected as his replacement on 19 May 1964.)	Labor	1973	1964–1981
William Murray	Labor	1976	1952–1976
Lindsay North	Labor	1976	1964–1976
Ernest O'Dea	Labor	1967	1943–1967
Clyde Packer	Liberal	1976	1964–1976
John Paterson	Liberal	1970	1958–1970
William Peters	Labor	1970	1959–1978
Thomas Playfair	Liberal	1967	1927–1966
Graham Pratten	Country	1976	1937–1976
Anne Press	Independent Labor	1970	1959–1978
Michael Quinn	Independent Labor	1970	1960–1965
Edna Roper	Labor	1970	1958–1978
Amelia Rygate (Note: Amelia Rygate (Independent Labor) was re-admitted to the Labor Party on 13 June 1966.)	Independent Labor / Labor	1967	1961–1978
Perceval Shipton	Liberal	1976	1964–1972
Leon Snider	Country	1967	1943–1965
Lloyd Sommerlad	Country	1967	1955–1967
Frank Spicer	Country	1973	1925–1973
Gavin Sutherland	Labor	1973	1956–1970
Norman Thom	Labor	1967	1950–1978
Sir Edward Warren	Liberal	1967	1955–1978
John Weir	Labor	1973	1949–1973
Ernest Wright	Labor	1967	1943–1973

== See also ==
- Renshaw ministry
- First Askin ministry
