= Members of the New South Wales Legislative Council, 1967–1970 =

Members of the New South Wales Legislative Council between 1967 and 1970 were indirectly elected by a joint sitting of the New South Wales Parliament, with 15 members elected every three years. The most recent election was on 8 December 1966, with the term of new members commencing on 23 April 1967. The President was Sir Harry Budd.

Name	Party	End term	Years in office
Harold Ahern	Liberal	1973	1949–1973
Alexander Alam	Labor	1973	1925–1958, 1963–1973
Alexander Armstrong (Note: Alexander Armstrong (Country) was expelled on 25 February 1969. Adrian Solomons (Country) was elected as his replacement on 12 March 1969.)	Country	1976	1952–1969
Evelyn Barron	Labor	1976	1964–1976
Norman Boland	Independent Labor	1976	1966–1970
Fred Bowen	Labor	1976	1966–1976
Arthur Bridges (Note: Arthur Bridges (Liberal) died on 22 May 1968. Bernard Riley (Liberal) was elected as his replacement on 29 August 1968.)	Liberal	1970	1946–1968
Roger de Bryon-Faes	Liberal	1973	1961–1981
Sir Harry Budd	Country	1970	1946–1978
Cedric Cahill	Labor	1973	1954–1973
Cyril Cahill	Independent Labor	1973	1949–1977
Jim Cahill	Labor	1970	1965–1978
John Carter (Note: John Carter (Country) resigned on 18 March 1968. Richmond Manyweathers (Country) was elected as his replacement on 11 April 1968.)	Country	1979	1955–1968
Hector Clayton	Liberal	1973	1937–1973
Harry Cockerill	Labor	1973	1959–1973
Col Colborne	Labor	1973	1949–1973
Leo Connellan (Note: Reginald Jackson (Labor) died on 16 August 1969. Leo Connellan (Country) was elected as his replacement on 5 September 1969.)	Country	1970	1969–1970, 1970–1981
William Coulter	Labor	1979	1947–1978
Jack Crawford (Note: Herbert FitzSimons (Country) died on 31 January 1970. Jack Crawford (Country) was elected as his replacement on 25 February 1970.)	Country	1970	1970
Chris Dalton	Labor	1970	1943–1970
Margaret Davis	Liberal	1979	1967–1978
Reg Downing	Labor	1976	1940–1972
Robert Erskine	Labor	1973	1949–1973
Stanley Eskell	Liberal	1970	1958–1978
Dick Evans (Note: Lawrence Schofield (Labor) died on 14 June 1969. Dick Evans (Liberal) was elected as his replacement on 28 August 1969.)	Liberal	1979	1969–1978
Otway Falkiner	Country	1970	1946–1978
Herbert FitzSimons	Country	1970	1955–1970
John Fuller	Country	1973	1961–1978
Eileen Furley	Liberal	1976	1962–1976
Harry Gardiner	Independent Labor	1979	1960–1974
Walter Geraghty	Labor	1979	1961–1978
Thomas Gleeson	Independent Labor	1970	1946–1975
Trevor Gordon	Labor	1976	1964–1976
Frederick Hewitt	Liberal	1979	1955–1976
Reginald Jackson	Labor	1970	1950–1969
Asher Joel	Country	1970	1958–1978
Geoffrey Keighley	Country	1979	1965–1978
Jim Kenny (Note: Jim Kenny (Labor) died on 12 October 1967. Hubert O'Connell (Independent Labor) was elected as his replacement on 16 November 1967.)	Labor	1976	1948–1967
John Kenny	Independent Labor	1970	1955–1970
Christopher Love	Labor	1973	1955–1970
Jim Maloney	Labor	1979	1941–1972
Richmond Manyweathers	Country	1979	1968–1978
Ralph Marsh	Labor	1976	1962–1976
John McIntosh	Country	1976	1964–1971
Thomas McKay	Liberal	1979	1966–1978
Herb McPherson	Labor	1973	1964–1981
William Murray	Labor	1976	1952–1976
Lindsay North	Labor	1976	1964–1976
Hubert O'Connell	Independent Labor	1976	1967–1971
Clyde Packer	Liberal	1976	1964–1976
John Paterson	Liberal	1970	1958–1970
William Peters	Labor	1970	1959–1978
Graham Pratten	Country	1976	1937–1976
Anne Press (Note: Anne Press (Independent Labor) joined the Liberal Party on 13 August 1967.)	Independent Labor / Liberal	1970	1959–1978
Bernard Riley	Liberal	1970	1968–1973
Edna Roper	Labor	1970	1958–1978
Amelia Rygate	Labor	1979	1961–1978
Lawrence Schofield	Labor	1979	1967–1969
Perceval Shipton	Liberal	1976	1964–1972
Adrian Solomons	Country	1976	1969–1991
Frank Spicer	Country	1973	1925–1973
Gavin Sutherland	Labor	1973	1956–1970
Norman Thom	Labor	1979	1950–1978
Eben Vickery	Country	1979	1967–1974
Sir Edward Warren	Liberal	1979	1955–1978
John Weir	Labor	1973	1949–1973
Ernest Wright	Labor	1979	1943–1973

== See also ==
- First Askin ministry
- Second Askin ministry
- Third Askin ministry
