= Members of the New South Wales Legislative Council, 1955–1958 =

Members of the New South Wales Legislative Council between 1952 and 1955 were indirectly elected by a joint sitting of the New South Wales Parliament, with 15 members elected every three years. The most recent election was on 26 November 1954, with the term of new members commencing on 23 April 1955. The President was William Dickson.

Name	Party	End term	Years in office
Harold Ahern	Liberal	1961	1949–1973
Alexander Alam	Labor	1958	1925–1958, 1963–1973
Alexander Armstrong	Country	1964	1952–1969
Thomas Armstrong (Note: Alan McNamara (Labor) died on 5 May 1955. Thomas Armstrong (Liberal) died on 13 June 1955. Colin Begg (Liberal) and Christopher Love (Labor) were elected to replace them on 15 September 1955.)	Liberal	1961	1935–1955
George Bassett	Country	1964	1932–1964
Colin Begg	Liberal	1961	1955–1964
Arthur Bridges	Liberal	1958	1946–1968
Harry Budd	Country	1958	1946–1978
Cedric Cahill	Labor	1961	1954–1973
Cyril Cahill	Labor	1961	1949–1977
John Carter	Country	1967	1955–1968
Hector Clayton	Independent	1961	1937–1973
Donald Cochrane	Labor	1964	1950–1964
Col Colborne	Labor	1961	1949–1973
James Concannon	Labor	1958	1925–1958
William Coulter	Labor	1967	1947–1978
Chris Dalton	Labor	1958	1943–1970
Robert Day	Labor	1967	1953–1967
William Dickson	Labor	1964	1925–1934, 1940–1966
Tom Dougherty (Note: John Stewart (Labor) died on 8 April 1957. Tom Dougherty (Labor) was elected to replace him on 24 September 1957.)	Labor	1967	1957–1961
Reg Downing	Labor	1964	1940–1972
Robert Erskine	Labor	1961	1949–1973
Otway Falkiner	Country	1958	1946–1978
Peter Fallon (Note: Peter Fallon (Labor) died on 9 February 1956. Gavin Sutherland (Labor) was elected to replace him on 2 May 1956.)	Labor	1961	1952–1956
Herbert FitzSimons (Note: Walter Padgen (Labor) died on 8 May 1955. Henry Horne (Liberal) died on 14 July 1955. Herbert FitzSimons (Liberal) and John Kenny (Labor) were elected to replace them on 14 September 1955.)	Liberal	1958	1955–1970
Thomas Gleeson	Labor	1958	1946–1975
Patrick Grace	Labor	1964	1952–1964
James Graves	Labor	1961	1934–1961
Charles Hackett	Labor	1964	1943–1964
Herbert Henley	Country	1964	1937–1964
Frederick Hewitt	Liberal	1967	1955–1976
Henry Horne	Liberal	1958	1917–1955
Reginald Jackson	Labor	1958	1950–1969
Jim Kenny	Labor	1964	1948–1967
John Kenny	Labor	1958	1955–1970
Robert King	Labor	1958	1931–1960
Christopher Love	Labor	1961	1955–1970
Robert Mahony	Labor	1967	1921–1961
Jim Maloney	Labor	1967	1941–1972
Sir Henry Manning	Liberal	1958	1932–1958
Alan McNamara	Labor	1961	1931–1934, 1937–1955
Gertrude Melville	Labor	1958	1952–1959
Thomas Murray	Independent	1958	1921–1958
William Murray	Labor	1964	1952–1976
George Neilly	Labor	1958	1954–1959
Ernest O'Dea	Labor	1967	1943–1967
Walter Padgen	Labor	1958	1946–1955
Thomas Playfair	Liberal	1967	1927–1966
Graham Pratten	Liberal	1964	1937–1976
Gerald Rygate	Labor	1967	1952–1960
Leicester Saddington	Liberal	1964	1952–1962
Robert Savage	Labor	1961	1931–1934, 1943–1959
Leon Snider	Liberal	1967	1943–1965
Lloyd Sommerlad	Country	1967	1955–1967
Frank Spicer	Country	1961	1925–1973
Thomas Steele	Country	1961	1934–1961
John Stewart	Labor	1967	1941–1957
Gavin Sutherland	Labor	1961	1956–1970
Norman Thom	Labor	1967	1950–1978
Henry Thompson	Liberal	1964	1940–1964
William Walmsley	Country	1964	1952–1964
Edward Warren	Liberal	1967	1955–1978
John Weir	Labor	1961	1949–1973
Samuel Williams	Labor	1964	1943–1962
Robert Wilson	Country	1961	1949–1961
Ernest Wright	Labor	1967	1943–1973

== See also ==
- Second Cahill ministry
- Third Cahill ministry
