= Members of the New South Wales Legislative Council, 1970–1973 =

The New South Wales Legislative Council is indirectly elected by a joint sitting of the New South Wales Parliament, with 15 members elected every three years. An election was held on 12 March 1970, with the term of new members commencing on 23 April 1970. The President was Sir Harry Budd.

Name	Party	End term	Years in office
Harold Ahern	Liberal	1973	1949–1973
Alexander Alam	Labor	1973	1925–1958, 1963–1973
Evelyn Barron	Labor	1976	1964–1976
Norman Boland (Note: Norman Boland (Independent Labor) died on 14 April 1970. Harry Sullivan (Independent) was elected as his replacement on 14 August 1970.)	Independent Labor	1976	1966–1970
Fred Bowen	Labor	1976	1966–1976
Roger de Bryon-Faes	Liberal	1973	1961–1981
Sir Harry Budd	Country	1982	1946–1978
Cedric Cahill	Labor	1973	1954–1973
Cyril Cahill	Independent Labor	1973	1949–1977
Jim Cahill	Labor	1982	1965–1978
Frank Calabro	Liberal	1982	1970–1988
Sir Hector Clayton	Liberal	1973	1937–1973
Harry Cockerill	Labor	1973	1959–1973
Col Colborne	Labor	1973	1949–1973
Leo Connellan (Note: Gavin Sutherland (Labor) died on 17 August 1970. Country candidate Leo Connellan was elected as his replacement on 9 September 1970.)	Country	1973	1969–1970, 1970–1981
William Coulter	Labor	1979	1947–1978
Margaret Davis	Liberal	1979	1967–1978
Reg Downing (Note: Hubert O'Connell (Independent Labor) died on 18 December 1971; Reg Downing (Labor) resigned on 4 February 1972. John Ducker (Labor) and Fred Duncan (Liberal) were elected as their replacements on 29 February 1972.)	Labor	1976	1940–1972
John Ducker	Labor	1976	1972–1979
Fred Duncan	Liberal	1976	1972–1984
Robert Erskine	Labor	1973	1949–1973
Thomas Erskine	Liberal	1982	1970–1978
Stanley Eskell	Liberal	1982	1958–1978
Dick Evans	Liberal	1979	1969–1978
Otway Falkiner	Country	1982	1946–1978
John Fuller	Country	1973	1961–1978
Eileen Furley	Liberal	1976	1962–1976
Harry Gardiner	Independent Labor	1979	1960–1974
Walter Geraghty	Labor	1979	1961–1978
Thomas Gleeson	Independent Labor	1982	1946–1975
Trevor Gordon	Labor	1976	1964–1976
Clive Healey	Labor	1982	1970–1988
Frederick Hewitt	Liberal	1979	1955–1976
John Holt (Note: Perceval Shipton (Liberal) died on 11 August 1972. John Holt (Liberal) was elected as his replacement on 30 August 1972.)	Liberal	1976	1972–1984
Ted Humphries (Note: Jim Maloney (Labor) resigned on 16 February 1972. Ted Humphries (Liberal) was elected as his replacement on 14 March 1972.)	Liberal	1979	1972–1978
Sir Asher Joel	Country	1982	1958–1978
Geoffrey Keighley	Country	1979	1965–1978
Bill Kennedy (Note: John McIntosh (Country) died on 10 August 1971. Bill Kennedy (Country) was elected as his replacement on 16 September 1971.)	Country	1976	1971–1984
Christopher Love (Note: Christopher Love (Labor) died on 7 April 1970. Max Willis (Liberal) was elected as his replacement on 2 September 1970.)	Labor	1973	1955–1970
Jim Maloney	Labor	1979	1941–1972
Richmond Manyweathers	Country	1979	1968–1978
Ralph Marsh	Labor	1976	1962–1976
John McIntosh	Country	1976	1964–1971
Thomas McKay	Liberal	1979	1966–1978
Herb McPherson	Labor	1973	1964–1981
William Murray	Labor	1976	1952–1976
Lindsay North	Labor	1976	1964–1976
Hubert O'Connell	Independent Labor	1976	1967–1971
Clyde Packer	Liberal	1976	1964–1976
William Peters	Labor	1982	1959–1978
Graham Pratten	Country	1976	1937–1976
Anne Press	Liberal	1982	1959–1978
Bernard Riley	Liberal	1982	1968–1973
Edna Roper	Labor	1982	1958–1978
Amelia Rygate	Labor	1979	1961–1978
Leroy Serisier	Labor	1982	1970–1978
Perceval Shipton	Liberal	1976	1964–1972
Adrian Solomons	Country	1976	1969–1991
Frank Spicer	Country	1973	1925–1973
Harry Sullivan	Independent Labor	1976	1970–1977
Gavin Sutherland	Labor	1973	1956–1970
Norman Thom	Labor	1979	1950–1978
Eben Vickery	Country	1979	1967–1974
Sir Edward Warren	Liberal	1979	1955–1978
John Weir	Labor	1973	1949–1973
Max Willis	Liberal	1973	1970–1999
Neville Wran	Labor	1982	1970–1973
Ernest Wright	Labor	1979	1943–1973

== See also ==
- Third Askin ministry
- Fourth Askin ministry
- Fifth Askin ministry
