= Members of the New South Wales Legislative Council, 1952–1955 =

Members of the New South Wales Legislative Council between 1952 and 1955 were indirectly elected by a joint sitting of the New South Wales Parliament, with 15 members elected every three years. The most recent election was on 30 November 1951, with the term of new members commencing on 23 April 1952. The President was Ernest Farrar until his death in June 1952 and then William Dickson.

Name	Party	End term	Years in office
Harold Ahern	Liberal	1961	1949–1973
Alexander Alam	Labor	1958	1925–1958, 1963–1973
Charles Anderson (Note: Charles Wilson Anderson (Labor) resigned on 28 February 1953. William Ferguson (Labor) was elected to replace him on 3 September 1953.)	Labor	1955	1951–1953
Alexander Armstrong	Country	1964	1952–1969
Thomas Armstrong	Liberal	1961	1935–1955
George Bassett	Country	1964	1932–1964
Arthur Bridges	Liberal	1958	1946–1968
Francis Buckley (Note: Francis Buckley (Labor) resigned on 30 June 1954. George Neilly (Labor) was elected to replace him on 14 September 1954.)	Labor	1958	1946–1954
Harry Budd	Country	1958	1946–1978
Cedric Cahill (Note: Hugh Latimer (Liberal) died on 10 May 1954. Cedric Cahill (Labor) was elected to replace him on 14 September 1954.)	Labor	1961	1954–1973
Cyril Cahill	Labor	1961	1949–1977
Hector Clayton	Liberal	1961	1937–1973
Donald Cochrane	Labor	1964	1950–1964
Col Colborne	Labor	1961	1949–1973
Arthur Colvin	Liberal	1955	1932–1955
James Concannon	Labor	1958	1925–1958
William Coulter	Labor	1955	1947–1978
Chris Dalton	Labor	1958	1943–1970
Robert Day (Note: William Ferguson (Labor) resigned on 18 September 1953. Robert Day (Labor) was elected to replace him on 18 November 1953.)	Labor	1955	1953–1967
William Dickson	Labor	1964	1925–1934, 1940–1966
Reg Downing	Labor	1964	1940–1972
Robert Erskine	Labor	1961	1949–1973
Otway Falkiner	Country	1958	1946–1978
Peter Fallon (Note: William Gibb (Labor) died on 8 August 1952. Peter Fallon (Labor) was elected to replace him on 24 September 1952.)	Labor	1961	1952–1956
Ernest Farrar (Note: Ernest Farrar (Liberal) died on 16 June 1952. Gertrude Melville (Labor) was elected to replace him on 10 September 1952.)	Liberal	1958	1912–1952
John Ferguson (Note: John Ferguson (Labor) resigned on 30 April 1952. Patrick Grace (Labor) was elected to replace him on 4 September 1952.)	Labor	1964	1945–1952
William Ferguson	Labor	1955	1953
William Gibb	Labor	1961	1931–1934, 1943–1952
Thomas Gleeson	Labor	1958	1946–1975
Patrick Grace	Labor	1964	1952–1964
James Graves	Labor	1961	1934–1961
Charles Hackett	Labor	1964	1943–1964
Herbert Henley	Country	1964	1937–1964
Henry Horne	Liberal	1958	1917–1955
Reginald Jackson	Labor	1958	1950–1969
Sir Norman Kater	Country	1955	1923–1955
Jim Kenny	Labor	1964	1948–1967
Robert King	Labor	1958	1931–1960
Hugh Latimer	Liberal	1961	1934–1955
Robert Mahony	Labor	1955	1921–1961
Jim Maloney	Labor	1955	1941–1972
Sir Henry Manning	Liberal	1958	1932–1958
Patrick McGirr	Labor	1955	1921–1955
Alan McNamara	Labor	1961	1931–1934, 1937–1955
Gertrude Melville	Labor	1958	1952–1959
Thomas Murray	Independent	1958	1921–1958
William Murray	Labor	1964	1952–1976
George Neilly	Labor	1958	1954–1959
Ernest O'Dea	Labor	1955	1943–1967
Walter Padgen	Labor	1958	1946–1955
Thomas Playfair	Liberal	1955	1927–1966
Graham Pratten	Liberal	1964	1937–1976
Gerald Rygate (Note: Ernest Sommerlad (Country) died on 6 September 1952. Gerald Rygate (Labor) was elected to replace him on 30 October 1952.)	Labor	1955	1952–1960
Leicester Saddington	Liberal	1964	1952–1962
Robert Savage	Labor	1961	1931–1934, 1943–1959
Leon Snider	Liberal	1955	1943–1965
Ernest Sommerlad	Country	1955	1932–1952
Frank Spicer	Country	1961	1925–1973
Thomas Steele	Country	1961	1934–1961
John Stewart	Labor	1955	1941–1957
Norman Thom	Labor	1955	1950–1978
Henry Thompson	Liberal	1964	1940–1964
William Walmsley	Country	1964	1952–1964
John Weir	Labor	1961	1949–1973
Horace Whiddon	Liberal	1955	1934–1955
Samuel Williams	Labor	1964	1943–1962
Robert Wilson	Country	1961	1949–1961
Ernest Wright	Labor	1955	1943–1973

== See also ==
- First Cahill ministry
- Second Cahill ministry
