= Members of the New South Wales Legislative Council, 1973–1976 =

Members of the New South Wales Legislative Council between 1973 and 1976 were indirectly elected by a joint sitting of the New South Wales Parliament, with 15 members elected every three years. The most recent election was on 5 April 1973, with the term of new members commencing on 23 April 1973. The President was Sir Harry Budd.

Name	Party	End term	Years in office
Kath Anderson	Labor	1985	1973–1981
Evelyn Barron	Labor	1976	1964–1976
Fred Bowen	Labor	1976	1966–1976
Roger de Bryon-Faes	Liberal	1985	1961–1981
Sir Harry Budd	Country	1982	1946–1978
Cyril Cahill	Independent Labor	1985	1949–1977
Jim Cahill	Labor	1982	1965–1978
Frank Calabro	Liberal	1982	1970–1988
Joe Calcraft	Liberal	1985	1973–1976
Leo Connellan	Country	1985	1969–1970, 1970–1981
William Coulter	Labor	1979	1947–1978
Margaret Davis	Liberal	1979	1967–1978
John Ducker	Labor	1976	1972–1979
Fred Duncan	Liberal	1976	1972–1984
Thomas Erskine	Liberal	1982	1970–1978
Stanley Eskell	Liberal	1982	1958–1978
Dick Evans	Liberal	1979	1969–1978
Otway Falkiner	Country	1982	1946–1978
Derek Freeman	Liberal	1985	1973–1981, 1981–1984
Barney French	Labor	1985	1973–1991
Sir John Fuller	Country	1985	1961–1978
Eileen Furley	Liberal	1976	1962–1976
Harry Gardiner (Note: Harry Gardiner (Independent Labor) died on 8 April 1974. Bob Scott (Liberal) was elected as his replacement on 15 August 1974.)	Independent Labor	1979	1960–1974
Walter Geraghty	Labor	1979	1961–1978
Thomas Gleeson (Note: Thomas Gleeson (Independent Labor) died on 25 November 1975. Doug Moppett (Country) was elected as his replacement on 3 March 1976.)	Independent Labor	1982	1946–1975
Trevor Gordon	Labor	1976	1964–1976
Jack Hallam	Labor	1985	1973–1991
Clive Healey	Labor	1982	1970–1988
Frederick Hewitt	Liberal	1979	1955–1976
John Holt	Liberal	1976	1972–1984
Ted Humphries	Liberal	1979	1972–1978
Sir Asher Joel	Country	1982	1958–1978
Geoffrey Keighley	Country	1979	1965–1978
Bill Kennedy	Country	1976	1971–1984
Paul Landa	Labor	1985	1973–1984
Lloyd Lange (Note: Bernard Riley (Liberal) and Neville Wran (Labor) resigned on 19 October 1973. Lloyd Lange (Liberal) and Joe Thompson (Labor) were elected as their replacements on 6 March 1974.)	Liberal	1982	1974–1986
Vi Lloyd	Liberal	1985	1973–1981
Toby MacDiarmid (Note: Ernest Wright (Labor) resigned on 16 April 1973. Toby MacDiarmid (Country) was elected as his replacement on 17 August 1973.)	Country	1979	1973–1988
Richmond Manyweathers	Country	1979	1968–1978
Ralph Marsh	Labor	1976	1962–1976
Thomas McKay	Liberal	1979	1966–1978
Peter McMahon	Labor	1985	1973–1981
Herb McPherson	Labor	1985	1964–1981
Robert Melville	Labor	1985	1973–1981
Doug Moppett	Country	1982	1976–1978, 1991–2002
William Murray	Labor	1976	1952–1976
Lindsay North	Labor	1976	1964–1976
Clyde Packer	Liberal	1976	1964–1976
William Peters	Labor	1982	1959–1978
Graham Pratten	Country	1976	1937–1976
Anne Press	Liberal	1982	1959–1978
Bernard Riley	Liberal	1982	1968–1973
Edna Roper	Labor	1982	1958–1978
Bob Rowland Smith (Note: Eben Vickery (Country) died on 26 August 1974. Bob Rowland Smith (Country) was elected as his replacement on 26 September 1974.)	Country	1979	1974–1999
Amelia Rygate	Labor	1979	1961–1978
Bob Scott	Liberal	1979	1974–1978
Leroy Serisier	Labor	1982	1970–1978
Adrian Solomons	Country	1976	1969–1991
Harry Sullivan (Note: Harry Sullivan (Independent) joined the Country Party in February 1974.)	Independent Labor / Country	1976	1970–1977
Norman Thom	Labor	1979	1950–1978
Joe Thompson	Labor	1982	1974–1988
Eben Vickery	Country	1979	1967–1974
Sir Edward Warren	Liberal	1979	1955–1978
Max Willis	Liberal	1985	1970–1999
Neville Wran	Labor	1982	1970–1973
Ernest Wright	Labor	1979	1943–1973

== See also ==
- Fifth Askin ministry
- Sixth Askin ministry
- First Lewis ministry
- Second Lewis ministry
- Willis ministry
