= Members of the New South Wales Legislative Council, 1949–1952 =

Members of the New South Wales Legislative Council between 1949 and 1952 were indirectly elected by a joint sitting of the New South Wales Parliament, with 15 members elected every three years. The most recent election was on 31 March 1949, with the term of new members commencing on 23 April 1949. The President was Ernest Farrar.

This election gave Labor a majority in the Legislative Council, its first since the re-constitution of the council in 1934, giving it a majority in both houses of parliament. The Labor Party expelled four members of the Legislative Assembly before the 1950 election - James Geraghty (North Sydney), John Seiffert (Monaro), Roy Heferen (Barwon) and Fred Stanley (Lakemba) for not following the party's endorsed ticket in the Legislative Council election, apparently voting for Bill McNamara who was 9th on the Labor ticket.

Name	Party	End term	Years in office
Harold Ahern	Liberal	1961	1949–1973
Alexander Alam	Labor	1958	1925–1958, 1963–1973
Charles Anderson (Note: William Robson (Liberal) died on 29 June 1951. Charles Anderson (Labor) was elected as his replacement on 11 October 1951.)	Labor	1955	1951–1953
Thomas Armstrong	Liberal	1961	1935–1955
George Bassett	Country	1952	1932–1964
Alfred Binks	Liberal	1952	1932–1952
Joseph Bodkin (Note: Joseph Bodkin (Labor) died on 18 March 1950. Reginald Jackson (Labor) was elected as his replacement on 12 April 1950.)	Labor	1958	1946–1950
Arthur Bridges	Liberal	1958	1946–1968
Francis Buckley	Labor	1958	1946–1954
Harry Budd	Country	1958	1946–1978
Cyril Cahill	Labor	1961	1949–1977
Hector Clayton	Liberal	1961	1937–1973
Donald Cochrane (Note: Jim Eggins (Country) resigned on 27 October 1949. Donald Cochrane (Labor) was elected as his replacement on 21 March 1950.)	Labor	1952	1950–1964
Col Colborne	Labor	1961	1949–1973
Arthur Colvin	Liberal	1955	1932–1955
James Concannon	Labor	1958	1925–1958
William Coulter	Labor	1955	1947–1978
Chris Dalton	Labor	1958	1943–1970
William Dickson	Labor	1952	1925–1934, 1940–1966
Reg Downing	Labor	1952	1940–1972
Jim Eggins	Country	1952	1940–1949
Robert Erskine	Labor	1961	1949–1973
Otway Falkiner	Country	1958	1946–1978
Ernest Farrar	Liberal	1958	1912–1952
John Ferguson	Labor	1952	1945–1952
William Gibb	Labor	1961	1931–1934, 1943–1952
Thomas Gleeson	Labor	1958	1946–1975
James Graves	Labor	1961	1934–1961
Charles Hackett	Labor	1952	1943–1964
Eli Harrison (Note: Eli Harrison (Labor) resigned on 28 October 1949. Norman Thom (Labor) was elected as his replacement on 22 March 1950.)	Labor	1955	1943–1949
Herbert Henley	Country	1952	1937–1964
Henry Horne	Liberal	1958	1917–1955
Reginald Jackson	Labor	1958	1950–1969
Sir Norman Kater	Country	1955	1923–1955
Jim Kenny	Labor	1952	1948–1967
Robert King	Labor	1958	1931–1960
Hugh Latimer	Liberal	1961	1934–1955
Robert Mahony	Labor	1955	1921–1961
Jim Maloney	Labor	1955	1941–1972
Sir Henry Manning	Liberal	1958	1932–1958
Patrick McGirr	Labor	1955	1921–1955
Alan McNamara	Labor	1961	1931–1934, 1937–1955
Thomas Murray	Independent	1958	1921–1958
Ernest O'Dea	Labor	1955	1943–1967
Walter Padgen	Labor	1958	1946–1955
Stanley Parry	Independent	1952	1940–1952
Thomas Playfair	Liberal	1955	1927–1966
Graham Pratten	Liberal	1952	1937–1976
William Robson	Liberal	1955	1920–1951
Robert Savage	Labor	1961	1931–1934, 1943–1959
Leon Snider	Liberal	1955	1943–1965
Ernest Sommerlad	Country	1955	1932–1952
Edmond Speck	Liberal	1952	1940–1952
Frank Spicer	Country	1961	1925–1973
Thomas Steele	Country	1961	1934–1961
John Stewart	Labor	1955	1941–1957
Colin Tannock	Labor	1952	1931–1952
Norman Thom	Labor	1955	1950–1978
Henry Thompson	Liberal	1952	1940–1964
John Weir	Labor	1961	1949–1973
Horace Whiddon	Liberal	1955	1934–1955
Samuel Williams	Labor	1952	1943–1962
Robert Wilson	Country	1961	1949–1961
Ernest Wright	Labor	1955	1943–1973

== See also ==
- Second McGirr ministry
- Third McGirr ministry
