= Members of the New South Wales Legislative Council, 1976–1978 =

Members of the New South Wales Legislative Council between 1976 and 1978 were indirectly elected by a joint sitting of the New South Wales Parliament, with 15 members elected every three years. The most recent election was on 27 November 1975, with the term of new members commencing on 23 April 1976. The terms of members were affected by the 1978 referendum which provided for the direct election of members of the Legislative Council. The members whose terms were due to expire in 1979 or 1982 had their terms expire at the next general election, held in 1978, those members whose terms were to expire in 1985 would retire at the second general election, held in 1981, and those members whose terms were to expire in 1988 would retire at the third general election, held in 1984.

The President was Sir Harry Budd.

Name	Party	End term	Years in office
Kath Anderson	Labor	1985	1973–1981
Peter Baldwin	Labor	1988	1976–1982
Roger de Bryon-Faes	Liberal	1985	1961–1981
Sir Harry Budd	National Country	1982	1946–1978
Don Burton	Labor	1988	1976–1984
Cyril Cahill (Note: Cyril Cahill (Independent Labor) died on 18 April 1977. Greg Percival (Liberal) was elected as his replacement on 12 October 1977.)	Independent Labor	1985	1949–1977
Jim Cahill	Labor	1982	1965–1978
Frank Calabro	Liberal	1982	1970–1988
Joe Calcraft (Note: Joe Calcraft (Liberal) died on 3 July 1976. Ted Pickering (Liberal) was elected as his replacement on 13 October 1976.)	Liberal	1985	1973–1976
Leo Connellan	National Country	1985	1969–1970, 1970–1981
William Coulter	Labor	1979	1947–1978
Fergus Darling	Liberal	1988	1976–1981
Margaret Davis (Note: Margaret Davis (Liberal) resigned on 13 September 1978 to contest the Legislative Assembly seat of Waverley. No by-election was held.)	Liberal	1979	1967–1978
John Ducker	Labor	1988	1972–1979
Fred Duncan	Liberal	1988	1972–1984
Thomas Erskine	Liberal	1982	1970–1978
Stanley Eskell	Liberal	1982	1958–1978
Dick Evans	Liberal	1979	1969–1978
Otway Falkiner	National Country	1982	1946–1978
Derek Freeman	Liberal	1985	1973–1981, 1981–1984
Barney French	Labor	1985	1973–1991
Sir John Fuller	National Country	1985	1961–1978
Walter Geraghty	Labor	1979	1961–1978
Jack Hallam	Labor	1985	1973–1991
Clive Healey	Labor	1982	1970–1988
Frederick Hewitt (Note: Frederick Hewitt (Liberal) resigned on 31 July 1976. Peter Philips (Liberal) was elected as his replacement on 13 October 1976.)	Liberal	1979	1955–1976
John Holt	Liberal	1988	1972–1984
Ted Humphries	Liberal	1979	1972–1978
Sir Asher Joel	National Country	1982	1958–1978
Johno Johnson	Labor	1988	1976–2001
Geoffrey Keighley	National Country	1979	1965–1978
Bill Kennedy	National Country	1988	1971–1984
Delcia Kite	Labor	1988	1976–1995
Paul Landa	Labor	1985	1973–1984
Lloyd Lange	Liberal	1982	1974–1986
Vi Lloyd	Liberal	1985	1973–1981
Toby MacDiarmid	National Country	1979	1973–1988
Richmond Manyweathers	National Country	1979	1968–1978
Thomas McKay	Liberal	1979	1966–1978
Peter McMahon	Labor	1985	1973–1981
Herb McPherson	Labor	1985	1964–1981
Robert Melville	Labor	1985	1973–1981
Doug Moppett	National Country	1982	1976–1978, 1991–2002
John Morris	Labor	1988	1976–1984
Nathanael Orr	Liberal	1988	1976–1984
Greg Percival	Liberal	1985	1977–1978, 1986–1988
William Peters (Note: William Peters (Labor) died on 21 February 1978. No by-election was held.)	Labor	1982	1959–1978
Peter Philips	Liberal	1979	1976–1988
Ted Pickering	Liberal	1985	1976–1988
Anne Press	Liberal	1982	1959–1978
Ronald Raines (Note: Harry Sullivan (National Country) died on 28 April 1977. Ronald Raines (National Country) was elected as his replacement on 12 October 1977.)	National Country	1988	1977–1978
Edna Roper	Labor	1982	1958–1978
Bob Rowland Smith	National Country	1979	1974–1999
Amelia Rygate	Labor	1979	1961–1978
Bill Sandwith	Liberal	1988	1976–1984
Bob Scott	Liberal	1979	1974–1978
Leroy Serisier	Labor	1982	1970–1978
Adrian Solomons	National Country	1988	1969–1991
Harry Sullivan	National Country	1988	1970–1977
Norman Thom	Labor	1979	1950–1978
Joe Thompson	Labor	1982	1974–1988
Roy Turner	Labor	1988	1976–1984
Sir Edward Warren	Liberal	1979	1955–1978
Max Willis	Liberal	1985	1970–1999

== See also ==
- First Wran ministry
