= Women in the New South Wales Legislative Council =

There have been 60 women in the New South Wales Legislative Council since its establishment in 1856. Women have had the right to stand as a candidate since 1918; the Council introduced direct election in 1978.

The first women appointed to the Legislative Council were Catherine Green and Ellen Webster in 1931, both appointed directly by the premier, Jack Lang. Green departed in 1932; after Webster's departure in 1934 women were absent from the Council until 1952, when Gertrude Melville became the first woman elected by the New South Wales Parliament to serve. Since then women have been continuously represented in the Legislative Council. The first Liberal woman to serve in the Legislative Council was Eileen Furley in 1962. The first National Party woman was Judy Jakins in 1984. The first minor-party woman was Democrat Elisabeth Kirkby, elected in 1981. The first Call to Australia/Christian Democrat woman was Marie Bignold in 1984; the first Greens woman was Lee Rhiannon in 1999. No female MLCs have been elected as independents, although Anne Press, Marie Bignold, Beryl Evans, Franca Arena and Helen Sham-Ho all left their parties and continued to sit as independents.

The first female minister in the Legislative Council was Virginia Chadwick, who was appointed Minister for Family and Community Services in 1988 by Premier Nick Greiner. Deirdre Grusovin and Carmel Tebbutt held ministerial positions in Labor governments before transferring to the Legislative Assembly.

== List of women in the New South Wales Legislative Council ==
Names in bold type indicate ministers and parliamentary secretaries. Names in italics are of women who entered the parliament through by-election or appointment. Names marked with an asterisk (*) also served in the Legislative Assembly. Where no closing date is shown, the MLC’s term of service is unexpired.

#	Name	Party	Period of service
1	Catherine Green	Labor	24 November 1931 – 7 September 1932 (resigned)
2	Ellen Webster	Labor	26 November 1931 – 22 April 1934 (defeated)
3	Gertrude Melville	Labor	10 September 1952 – 21 August 1959 (died)
4	Edna Roper	Labor	23 April 1958 – 5 November 1978 (retired)
5	Anne Press	Labor/Ind Labor/Liberal	22 October 1959 – 5 November 1978 (retired)
6	Amelia Rygate	Ind Labor/Labor	7 September 1961 – 5 November 1978 (retired)
7	Eileen Furley	Liberal	14 November 1962 – 22 April 1976 (retired)
8	Evelyn Barron	Labor	23 April 1964 – 22 April 1976 (retired)
9	Margaret Davis	Liberal	23 April 1967 – 15 September 1978 (resigned to run for LA)
10	Kath Anderson	Labor	23 April 1973 – 28 August 1981 (retired)
10	Vi Lloyd	Liberal	23 April 1973 – 28 August 1981 (retired)
12	Delcia Kite	Labor	23 April 1976 – 3 March 1995 (retired)
13	Marie Fisher	Labor	7 October 1978 – 22 February 1988 (retired)
14	**Virginia Chadwick**	Liberal	6 November 1978 – 5 March 1999 (retired)
14	**Deirdre Grusovin***	Labor	6 November 1978 – 31 May 1990 (resigned to run for LA)
14	Dorothy Isaksen	Labor	6 November 1978 – 22 February 1988 (defeated); 4 July 1990 – 5 March 1999 (retired)
17	Franca Arena	Labor/Independent	27 October 1981 – 5 March 1999 (defeated)
17	Elisabeth Kirkby	Democrats	27 October 1981 – 25 June 1998 (resigned)
19	Ann Symonds	Labor	8 September 1982 – 30 April 1998 (resigned)
20	Beryl Evans	Liberal/Independent	30 April 1984 – 3 March 1995 (defeated)
20	Judy Jakins	National	30 April 1984 – 1 July 1991 (seat abolished)
22	Marie Bignold	Call to Australia/Independent	5 December 1984 – 1 July 1991 (seat abolished)
22	Judith Walker	Labor	5 December 1984 – 3 March 1995 (retired)
24	Marlene Goldsmith	Liberal	19 March 1988 – 5 March 1999 (retired)
24	Elaine Nile	Call to Australia/CDP	19 March 1988 – 27 August 2002 (resigned)
24	Helen Sham-Ho	Liberal/Independent	19 March 1988 – 28 February 2003 (retired)
27	Meredith Burgmann	Labor	25 May 1991 – 23 March 2007 (retired)
27	Jan Burnswoods	Labor	25 May 1991 – 23 March 2007 (retired)
27	Patricia Forsythe	Liberal	25 May 1991 – 22 September 2006 (resigned)
27	Jenny Gardiner	National	25 May 1991 – 6 March 2015 (retired)
31	Janelle Saffin	Labor	25 March 1995 – 28 February 2003 (retired)
31	Patricia Staunton	Labor	25 March 1995 – 2 September 1997 (resigned)
33	**Carmel Tebbutt***	Labor	30 April 1998 – 26 August 2005 (resigned to run for LA)
34	Lee Rhiannon	Greens	27 March 1999 – 19 July 2010 (resigned to run for Senate)
35	Amanda Fazio	Labor	30 August 2000 – 6 March 2015 (retired)
36	Melinda Pavey*	National	3 September 2002 – 6 March 2015 (retired to run for LA)
37	Catherine Cusack	Liberal	22 March 2003 –
37	Kayee Griffin	Labor	22 March 2003 – 4 March 2011 (retired)
37	Sylvia Hale	Greens	22 March 2003 – 6 September 2010 (resigned)
37	Robyn Parker*	Liberal	22 March 2003 – 4 March 2011 (retired to run for LA)
37	Christine Robertson	Labor	22 March 2003 – 4 March 2011 (retired)
42	**Penny Sharpe**	Labor	11 October 2005 – 5 March 2015 (resigned); 6 May 2015 –
43	Marie Ficarra*	Liberal	24 March 2007 – 6 March 2015 (retired)
43	Lynda Voltz*	Labor	24 March 2007 – 28 February 2019 (retired to run for LA)
43	Helen Westwood	Labor	24 March 2007 – 6 March 2015 (defeated)
46	Sophie Cotsis	Labor	7 September 2010 – 16 September 2016 (resigned to run for LA)
46	Cate Faehrmann	Greens	7 September 2010 – 18 June 2013 (resigned to run for Senate); 15 August 2018 –
48	Jan Barham	Greens	26 March 2011 – 13 February 2017 (resigned)
48	**Natasha Maclaren-Jones**	Liberal	26 March 2011 –
48	**Sarah Mitchell**	National	26 March 2011 –
51	Mehreen Faruqi	Greens	19 June 2013 – 14 August 2018 (resigned to be appointed to Senate)
52	**Courtney Houssos**	Labor	28 March 2015 –
52	**Bronnie Taylor**	National	28 March 2015 – 16 September 2024
54	Dawn Walker	Greens	22 February 2017 – 23 March 2019 (defeated)
55	**Natalie Ward**	Liberal	16 November 2017 –
56	Abigail Boyd	Greens	23 March 2019 –
56	Emma Hurst	Animal Justice	23 March 2019 –
56	**Tara Moriarty**	Labor	23 March 2019 –
59	**Rose Jackson**	Labor	8 May 2019 –
60	Sue Higginson	Greens	12 May 2022 –
61	Nichole Overall	National	13 September 2025 –

== Proportion of women in the Council ==
Numbers and proportions are as they were directly after the beginning of Council terms and do not take into account deaths, resignations, appointments, defections or other changes in membership.

Term	Labor			Liberal			National			Greens			Others			Total		
Term	Women	Total	%	Women	Total	%	Women	Total	%	Women	Total	%	Women	Total	%	Women	Total	%
1952–1955	0	33	0.0%	0	14	0.0%	0	11	0.0%	0	0	0.0%	0	2	0.0%	0	60	0.0%
1955–1958	1	35	2.9%	0	12	0.0%	0	11	0.0%	0	0	0.0%	0	2	0.0%	1	60	1.7%
1958–1961	2	34	5.9%	0	13	0.0%	0	11	0.0%	0	0	0.0%	0	2	0.0%	2	60	3.3%
1961–1964	1	23	4.3%	0	11	0.0%	0	15	0.0%	0	0	0.0%	1	10	10.0%	2	59	3.4%
1964–1967	2	27	7.4%	1	11	9.1%	0	12	0.0%	0	0	0.0%	2	8	25.0%	5	58	8.6%
1967–1970	3	29	10.3%	2	12	16.7%	0	12	0.0%	0	0	0.0%	1	7	14.3%	6	60	10.0%
1970–1973	3	27	11.1%	3	15	20.0%	0	11	0.0%	0	0	0.0%	0	6	0.0%	6	59	10.2%
1973–1976	4	24	16.7%	4	20	20.0%	0	11	0.0%	0	0	0.0%	0	4	0.0%	8	59	13.6%
1976–1978	4	23	17.4%	3	22	13.6%	0	13	0.0%	0	0	0.0%	0	1	0.0%	7	59	11.9%
1978–1981	5	23	21.7%	2	14	14.3%	0	6	0.0%	0	0	0.0%	0	0	0.0%	7	43	16.3%
1981–1984	5	24	20.8%	1	12	8.3%	0	6	0.0%	0	0	0.0%	1	2	50.0%	7	44	15.9%
1984–1988	6	24	25.0%	2	11	18.2%	1	7	14.3%	0	0	0.0%	1	3	33.3%	10	45	22.2%
1988–1991	5	21	23.8%	4	12	33.3%	1	7	14.3%	0	0	0.0%	3	5	60.0%	13	45	28.9%
1991–1995	7	18	38.9%	6	13	38.5%	1	7	14.3%	0	0	0.0%	2	4	50.0%	15	42	35.7%
1995–1999	7	17	41.2%	4	13	30.8%	1	5	20.0%	0	1	0.0%	2	6	33.3%	14	42	33.3%
1999–2003	4	16	25.0%	1	9	11.1%	1	4	25.0%	1	2	50.0%	2	11	18.2%	9	42	21.4%
2003–2007	6	18	33.3%	3	9	33.3%	2	4	50.0%	2	3	66.7%	0	8	0.0%	13	42	31.0%
2007–2011	6	19	31.6%	3	10	30.0%	2	5	40.0%	2	4	50.0%	0	4	0.0%	13	42	31.0%
2011–2015	5	14	35.7%	3	13	23.1%	3	7	42.9%	2	5	40.0%	0	4	0.0%	13	42	31.0%
2015–2019	4	12	33.3%	2	13	15.4%	2	7	28.6%	2	5	40.0%	0	5	0.0%	10	42	23.8%
2019–2023	4	13	30.8%	3	11	27.2%	2	4	40.0%	2	4	50.0%	1	8	12.5%	12	42	28.6%
2023–2027	6	15	40.0%	6	9	66.7%	2	5	40.0%	4	4	100.0%	2	9	22.2%	12	42	47.6%
