= Peter Fallon =

Peter Fallon may refer to:

- Peter Fallon (poet), Irish poet, editor, publisher and professor
- Peter Fallon (politician) (1881–1956), Australian politician
