= Ronald Raines (politician) =

Australian politician

Ronald Bruce Raines (born 6 November 1929) is a former Australian politician. He was a National Country Party member of the New South Wales Legislative Council from 1977 to 1978.

Raines was born in Sydney, the son of accountant Douglas William Raines and Jean Laurie Pilcher. He was educated at Sydney Boys' High School (1941–1946) and studied to be an accountant, qualifying in 1953. From 1955 to 1965 he was a partner of R.A. Irish & Michelmore, and from 1964 to 1968 he was Chairman of AEI Ltd. He continued to be highly active in financial circles, holding many positions including Chairman of the New South Wales State Dockyard.

On 12 October 1977, he was elected to the New South Wales Legislative Council to fill a casual vacancy caused by the death of NCP MLC Harry Sullivan. Two weeks later, on 21 October 1977, he married his third wife Helen Janet Cadwallader. He had a son from his first marriage, a daughter and a son from his second marriage and no children from his third marriage. Raines did not contest the 1978 state election, when the size of the Council was reduced and he was not included on the Coalition ticket.
