= George Ford (Australian politician) =

Australian politician

George Thomas Ford (10 October 1907 – 30 July 1966) was an Australian politician.

He was born at Fairy Hill near Casino to labourer George Thomas Ford and Maud Williams. The family moved to Parramatta and he was educated by the Marist Brothers. He worked as a labourer in a biscuit factor from 1928 to 1941, when he enlisted in the AIF, serving in New Guinea. From 1945 to 1950 he was a builders labourer, and from 1950 to 1954 he worked as a paint maker. In 1954 he became assistant secretary of the Federal Miscellaneous Workers' Union, holding that position until his death. From 1964 to 1966 he was a Labor member of the New South Wales Legislative Council. Ford died at Lidcombe in 1966.

He married three times: firstly to Evelyn Doris Drayton, with whom he had six children; secondly to Bonnie Green, with whom he had one son; and thirdly to Daisy Daphne Cook, with whom he had three children.
