= Doug Moppett =

Australian politician

The Honourable Doug Moppett

Member of the New South Wales Legislative Council
- In office 31 May 1976 – 5 November 1978
- Preceded by: Thomas Gleeson
- In office 25 May 1991 – 14 June 2002
- Preceded by: Judy Jakins
- Succeeded by: Melinda Pavey

Personal details
- Born: 14 May 1940 Sydney
- Died: 18 June 2002 (aged 62) Quambone, near Coonamble, New South Wales
- Party: The Nationals
- Spouse: Helen
- Children: 2 sons
- Occupation: Grazier

Douglas Frederick Moppett (14 May 1940 – 18 June 2002) was an Australian politician. He was a Country Party, later National Party, member of the New South Wales Legislative Council from 1976 to 1978 and again from 1991 up until 2002. He died from liver cancer a week after his announced his retirement from Parliament.

== Biography ==
Moppett was born in Sydney, and was a grazier and pastoralist before entering politics. On 13 October 1965 he married Helen Golsby, with whom he had two sons. He served thirteen years on Coonamble Shire Council, including one year as Deputy President.

=== National Party politics ===
Moppett was a member of the Country Party (later the National Party), and was on its Central Executive from 1971 to 1999, as vice-chairman 1972–1986 and chairman 1986–1991. He was also on the party's Federal Council 1978–1992.

During the period of Doug Moppet's chairmanship, the National Party was faced with perhaps the greatest challenge in its history, the Joh for Canberra campaign, which was akin to civil war within the National Party. In moving a motion of condolence in the New South Wales Legislative Assembly, National Party leader George Souris quoted a couple of paragraphs from the book written by Paul Kelly, The End of Certainty—Power, Politics and Business in Australia.

Souris, quoting Kelly, said:

The Joh-for-Canberra push split the Nationals at their base. The Joh war was conducted state-by-state. Joh's real opposition was the NSW National Party, which had no intention of falling for Joh-power and was appalled by his tactics. The NSW party was (Ian) Sinclair's power base, the home of a successful state level coalition which aspired to win the next state election and had a firm and competent state chairman, Doug Moppett. From the start Moppett spoke for the NSW party in saying that coalition unity was essential, that outside pressure on the party would be resisted, that proper constitutional process would be followed in preselection, and that NSW would not tolerate Queensland disruption of the federal coalition. In the war that would engulf the National Party, the attack of the Queenslanders would be met with an equally determined defence in NSW. This would prove fundamental in breaking the Joh push. Moppett was backed by National Party federal president then Shirley McKerrow. The NSW National Party central executive supported Sinclair's leadership, the federal coalition, and the independence of the federal National Party. It was the NSW party which would eventually smash Joh. ... Joh's weakness was induced partly by a secret deal struck in Howard's office between the NSW National and Liberal Parties, and formally embodied in a two-page signed document. Its effect was to lock Joh out of the biggest state.

=== New South Wales state political biography ===
Following the death of Thomas Gleeson MLC, Moppett filled a casual vacancy in the New South Wales Legislative Council in 1976, serving until 1978. In June 1978, voters approved a referendum to introduce a directly elected Legislative Council – as previous appointments to the council had been through party nomination. The 1978 general election was New South Wales' first elections to the New South Wales Legislative Council; that were held simultaneously with elections for the New South Wales Legislative Assembly. Moppett was not successful in retaining his seat in the Wranslide that saw an 8% swing to Labor under Premier Neville Wran.

Moppett was an unsuccessful candidate for election to the Australian Senate at the 1983 federal election. He was re-elected to the Legislative Council in 1991 in a pre-selection battle that saw sitting Councillor Judy Jakins MLC lose National Party endorsement.

In 1997, Moppett was involved in a motor vehicle accident in Coonamble in which 38-year-old mother Beth Fleming was killed. Moppett was injured and hospitalised. Nearly four months after that accident Moppett was charged with a number of driving offences, some of them serious. In May 2000, Moppett announced his intention to resign from Parliament should he be proven guilty. A trial eventually proceeded and, in 2000, Moppett was found not guilty by a jury on the serious driving charges. The lesser charges were listing for hearing in the Local Court in May 2002, but the prosecution advised that it was unable to deal with certain matters put before the court and another hearing date was set for 18 June 2002 – the day that Moppett eventually died.

During his parliamentary career Moppett was renowned as a great orator and, in 1997, was appointed Deputy Opposition Whip. He retained this position until he announced his resignation from Parliament on 13 June 2002, dying at his home at Quambone, west of Coonamble, New South Wales a few days later on 18 June 2002.
