= Greg Percival =

Australian politician

Harold Gregory Percival OBE (4 April 1925 – 8 May 2011) was an Australian politician. He was a Liberal member of the New South Wales Legislative Council from 1977 to 1978 and from 1986 to 1988.

Born in Campbelltown, Percival was educated at Ingleburn Primary School, Parramatta Intermediate School and Taylor's Coaching College. He became a telegraph messenger in 1941, and was employed by the Royal Australian Navy in this capacity from 1942 to 1946, serving in anti-submarine patrol boats in New Guinea and the south-west Pacific Islands.

After the war he became a retail butcher. He married Diana Mary Drew on 2 June 1951, with whom he had three children. In 1956 he was elected to Campbelltown City Council, serving as mayor from 1960 to 1961. He had been a member of the Ingleburn branch of the Liberal Party since 1950.

In 1965 he became an executive member of the Local Government Association of New South Wales (he would serve as President from 1974 to 1976). He also served as President of the Ingleburn Liberal Party from 1967 to 1969 and Treasurer of the Federal Electoral Council from 1966 to 1969. He was appointed an Officer of the Order of the British Empire in 1976.

On 12 October 1977, Percival was appointed to the New South Wales Legislative Council as a Liberal member, serving until the first upper house election in 1978. He was appointed again on 5 February 1986 after the resignation of Lloyd Lange, and served until 1988. After his departure from politics he became President of the Fairmile Association from 1989 to 2005. Percival died on 8 May 2011, aged 86.
