= Lawrence Schofield =

Australian politician

Lawrence Edward Schofield (2 December, 1908 – 14 June, 1969) was an Australian politician.

== Early life ==
He was born at Tamworth to grocer William Edward Schofield and Madeline Bizant. He attended the local Dominican convent until 1939, when he became a mill operator at Mayfield. On 6 June, 1931 he married Ilma Scott, with whom he had two children.

== Career ==
In 1948, he joined the Labor Party, serving on the central executive from 1957 to 1958 and from 1961 to 1967; he was also the Newcastle secretary of the Federated Ironworkers' Association from 1949 to 1967. From 1967 to 1969, he was a Labor member of the New South Wales Legislative Council.

== Death ==
Schofield died at Merewether in 1969.
