= Jack Crawford (politician) =

Australian politician

Jack Mitchell Crawford (1 March 1916 – 18 August 1982) was an Australian politician.

He was born in Armidale to overseer Alexander Crawford and Ethel Mallam. He was a stock worker at Trangie, and from 1939 to 1945 served in the AIF, attaining the rank of major. On his return he moved to Dubbo. In 1941 he had married Joan Brooks; they had three daughters. A member of the Country Party, he was on the party council from 1959 to 1977, the central executive from 1959 to 1971, and was vice-chairman from 1962 to 1963. He was briefly a member of the New South Wales Legislative Council, serving from February to April 1970. Crawford died at Glebe in 1982.
