= Joseph Bodkin =

Australian politician

Joseph Anthony Bodkin (11 August 1902 – 18 March 1950) was an Australian politician.

He was born in Lithgow to union organiser George Clifford Bodkin and Bridget Ellen Callaghan. He attended a convent school in Marrickville and then a Chapel Street public school, working for the railways from the age of fourteen. He was involved with the railway branch of the Australian Workers' Union, working as an organiser from 1924 to 1926. He married Mary Elizabeth Delany, with whom he had six daughters. From 1927 he worked for the Public Works Department and later with the Metropolitan, Water, Sewerage and Draining Board, in the course of which he worked on the Woronora Dam. From 1948 to 1950 he served on Sydney City Council, and from 1946 to 1950 he was a Labor member of the New South Wales Legislative Council. He died at Little Bay in 1950.
