= Joe Calcraft =

Australian dairy farmer and politician

Member of the New South Wales Legislative Council
- In office 23 April 1973 – 3 July 1976

Personal details
- Born: Joseph Calcraft; 10 March 1929 Numbaa, New South Wales
- Died: 3 July 1976 (aged 47)
- Spouse: Winsome
- Children: three
- Occupation: dairy farmer
- Awards: OBE

Joseph Calcraft OBE (10 March 1929 – 3 July 1976) was an Australian dairy farmer and politician. He was a successful breeder of Friesian dairy cattle at his Meadow Glen stud. He served as president of the New South Wales Dairy Farmers Association for many years and ultimately entering the New South Wales Legislative Council.

== Personal ==
Calcraft was born at Numbaa near Nowra. He attended primary school at Nowra, then Scots College in Sydney and Hawkesbury Agricultural College. He became a successful and innovative dairy farmer and stud breeder of Friesian dairy cattle. He was also an avid sportsman, playing A grade rugby and cricket and was a champion tennis player. A leader, he served on several community associations including the Shoalhaven Council (1962–1965), the Hospital Board, and was president of the New South Wales Dairy Farmers Association and NSW Dairy Industry Council. in 1960 he was awarded a Nuffield Scholarship that resulted in his going on a study trip to the United Kingdom, Europe and Russia. He was a first in several areas in the dairy industry, importing the bull Fintdave Reunion from England to establish his own artificial insemination procedures and conducting stud sales on his property. He judged at every Royal show in Australia and at many country shows. In 1971 he was awarded the OBE for his role in the dairy industry. Elected to the New South Wales Legislative Council in 1973 as a Liberal with the intention of better serving the dairy industry, he served until his death three years later. He left his wife, Winsome, and children Jennifer, Alan and Ian.
