= Charles Wilson Anderson =

Australian politician

Charles Wilson Anderson (16 February 1918 – 15 August 2009) was an Australian politician.

He was born in Burwood to labourer Mervyn Wilson and Alicia Mabel McDonald. After attending Granville Technical College he became a plumber. On 2 August 1941 he married Vera Josephine Delaney, with whom he had six children. He served as assistant secretary of the Plumbers and Gas Fitters' Union from 1943 to 1949 and as president of the Trades and Labor Council from 1947 to 1949. He was on the Australian Labor Party central executive from 1946 to 1950 (vice-president from 1947 to 1950), and was assistant secretary of the New South Wales branch of the party from 1947 to 1949. He was also a member of the Australian Broadcasting Commission from 1949 to 1952. From 1951 to 1953 he served as a Labor member of the New South Wales Legislative Council, the abolition of which he opposed against party policy. After leaving the Council he was a delegate to the federal executive from 1953 to 1954. After he resigned the secretaryship of the Plumbers and Gas Fitters' Union in 1954, he left politics and from 1962 worked as a milk vendor. Anderson died in 2009.
