= Ernest Sommerlad =

Australian politician

Ernest Christian Sommerlad CBE (30 January 1886 – 6 September 1952) was an Australian politician.

He was born in Tenterfield to farmer John Henry Sommerlad. He was educated at Leechs Gully until the age of eleven, when he left to work on the family farm. Sommerlad read extensively in his spare time and continued to educate himself. Bible texts were of particular interest. Aged 21, he attended Newington College where he was conspicuous amongst his much younger schoolfellows. Despite this peculiar situation he passed the junior public examination in 1908. Following that he was accepted as a candidate for the Methodist ministry. The Wesleyan Theological Institution was then still based on the Newington campus and so he remained a student at Stanmore. After a period as a missionary in Fiji in 1911, he became a journalist and by 1919 was a managing editor. On 15 March 1913 he married Mildred Alice Vaughan, with whom he had four children. He continued to be significant in broadcasting and was president of the Country Press Association from 1927 to 1928. A foundation member of the Country Party, he was a member of the New South Wales Legislative Council from 1932 until his death at Lindfield in 1952. He had served in the military from 1941 to 1945 and was appointed Commander of the Order of the British Empire in 1938. His son Lloyd Sommerlad was also a member of the Legislative Council.
