= Eben Vickery =

Australian politician

Eben Kelvin Edward Vickery (3 April 1910 – 26 August 1974) was an Australian politician.

He was born in Sydney to solicitor Ebenezer Frank Vickery and Ethel Agnes Rabbitts. He was educated at Scots College and became a farmer and grazier. On 26 February 1936 he married Dulcie Scouller, with whom he had four daughters. From 1941 to 1974 he served on Namoi Shire Council, being eleven times president. From 1967 to 1974 he was a Country Party member of the New South Wales Legislative Council. Vickery died at Bellevue Hill in 1974.
