= Norman Boland =

Australian politician

Norman Thomas Boland (31 March 1900 – 14 April 1970) was an Australian politician.

He was born in Millie to grazier Matthew Boland and Alice Agnes Mullens. He was educated at St Joseph's College, Hunters Hill, and became a solicitor at Moree. He was twice married: first, on 12 January 1927, to Lena Mary Margaret Palmer, with whom he had seven children, and secondly, on 28 May 1962, to Marie O'Keefe. From 1966 to 1970 he was a member of the New South Wales Legislative Council; he was associated with the Independent Labor Group. Boland was in ill health for most of his political career and died in Sydney in 1970.
