= John Ferguson (New South Wales politician) =

Australian politician (1903–1969)

John Alexander Ferguson (31 May 1903 – 2 August 1969) was an Australian politician.

He was born near Glen Innes to miner Alexander Ferguson. He was educated at convent schools in Annandale from 1916, working variously in brass and jewellery before joining the railways in 1926. On 25 July 1925 he married Beatrice Jago, with whom he had eight children. An Australian Labor Party member from 1926, he was an organiser for the Australian Railways Union from 1935 and state secretary from 1943 to 1952; he was also vice-president of the New South Wales Labor Party from 1943 to 1947, president from 1947 to 1952, and federal president from 1950 to 1952. From 1945 to 1952 he was a Labor member of the New South Wales Legislative Council. He resigned in 1952 to take up a post as chairman of the New South Wales Milk Board, a position he held until 1968. Ferguson died in 1969 at Lane Cove.
