= John McIntosh (Australian politician) =

Australian politician

John Charles McIntosh (11 April 1901 – 10 August 1971) was an Australian politician.

He was born in Lismore to solicitor John Charles McIntosh. He was educated at Lismore and Armidale and followed his father into law, being admitted as a solicitor in 1924. During World War II he served in New Guinea with the Royal Australian Air Force. In addition to his legal practice, he owned a farm at Bexhill and directed a number of local media companies, along with being active in a number of Lismore sports clubs. He was married twice and had two children. From 1964 to 1971 he was a Country Party member of the New South Wales Legislative Council. McIntosh died at Lismore in 1971.
