= Michael Quinn (Australian politician) =

Australian politician

Michael Thomas Leslie Quinn (23 October 1900 – 12 July 1965) was an Australian politician.

Born in Homebush to Irish migrants Michael Quinn and Maria Gannon, he attended Christian Brothers College in Burwood, becoming a shop assistant. On 15 April 1932 he married Rita Munro, with whom he would have eight children. He began farming at Boomi, becoming a Boomi Shire Councillor from 1941 to 1959 (president 1952–1959) and Chairman of the Moree District Local Government Committee (1954–59). A member of the Labor Party, he was appointed to the New South Wales Legislative Council in 1960 but immediately resigned from the party to join the Independent Labor Group, which opposed the official party policy of abolition of the Legislative Council. Quinn retired from farming in 1963 and died in Gosford in 1965.
