= Walter Padgen =

Australian politician (1882–1955)

Walter Thomas Padgen (21 March 1882 – 8 May 1955) was a British-born Australian politician.

He was born in Woolwich to compositor John Padgen and Emma Eliza Holder. He worked in the Royal Arsenal laboratory before migrating to New South Wales around 1908; there he became an engineer. From 1910 he worked as a machinist on the railways, but he was dismissed in 1917 after supporting a strike and reinstated in 1922. On 19 May 1922 he married Margaret Chayter. From 1941 to 1948 he was a Randwick alderman, serving as mayor in 1948. He was a Labor member of the New South Wales Legislative Council from 1946 to 1955, when he died at Rydalmere.
