= Perceval Shipton =

English-born Australian politician

Perceval Martin Maurice Shipton (17 June 1906 – 11 August 1972) was an English-born Australian politician.

He was born at Teignmouth in Devon to Royal Navy commander John Perceval Shipton and Helen Hale. He moved to Australia at a young age and attended The King's School in Parramatta. He worked as a woolclasser before purchasing a dairy farm at Milton. During World War II he served in the AIF, attaining the rank of corporal. He owned additional property in England, and was active in the surf lifesaving community, with a long membership of the Surf Life Saving Association. He was the first rural member of the executive and a founder of the Mollymook Surf Club. A member of the Liberal Party, he served on the state executive from 1954 to 1970 and was a member of the New South Wales Legislative Council from 1964 to 1972. Shipton died in Sydney in 1972.
