= Thomas Erskine (politician) =

Australian politician

Thomas Reginald Erskine MC (26 March 1917 – 7 June 2008) was an Australian politician.

He was born in Griffith to fruit farmers John Channon and Kate Mary Gertrude Erskine. He was educated locally and followed his father as an orchardist, moving into rice, cattle and wheat from 1954. During World War II he served in the AIF, achieving the rank of lieutenant and being awarded the Military Cross. A member of the Liberal Party, he served in the New South Wales Legislative Council from 1970 to 1978. Erskine died at Griffith in 2008.
