= Tom Dougherty (union official) =

Australian politician (1902–1972)

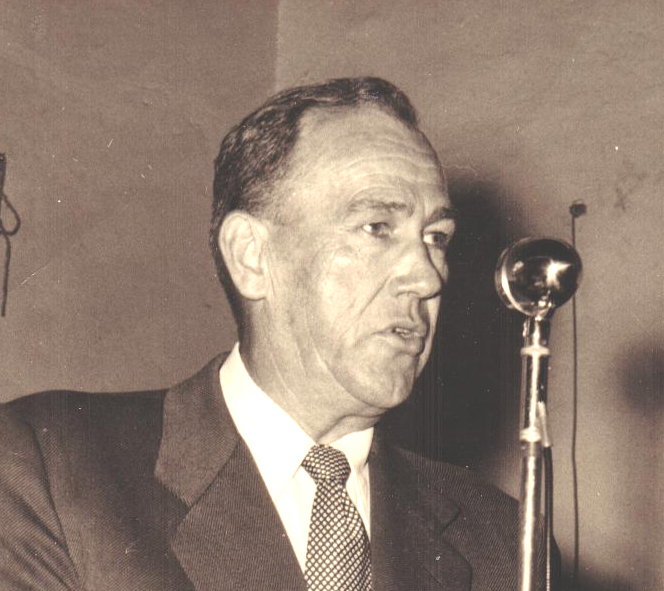

National Secretary of the Australian Workers' Union
- In office 1944–1972

Member of the New South Wales Legislative Council
- In office September 1957 – 1961

Personal details
- Born: 2 March 1902 Bollon, Queensland
- Died: 14 October 1972 (aged 70)

Tom Nicholson Pearce Dougherty (2 March 1902 – 14 October 1972), was an Australian trade union official and a member of the New South Wales Legislative Council. As National Secretary of the Australian Workers Union (AWU) from 1944 to 1972, he was one of the most powerful figures in the Australian labor movement and the Labor Party.

== Biography ==
Dougherty was born in Bollon, Queensland, the son of a telegraph linesman and a schoolteacher. He left school at 13 and worked in a variety of manual jobs in Queensland, New South Wales and the Australian territory of Papua New Guinea. In 1924 he married Ruby McArthur: they had three children. After his wife's death he married again, in 1951, and again in 1959.

In 1932 Dougherty became an organiser for the AWU in Mackay, Queensland. He became the union's northern district secretary in 1938 and Queensland branch president in 1943. This position gave him a position on the central executive of the Queensland branch of the Labor Party. Dougherty was on the right wing of Labor, being a strong anti-communist at a time when the Communist Party of Australia was very powerful in the unions, particularly in north Queensland.

In January 1944 Dougherty was appointed general secretary of the AWU, a position he retained until his death, and he moved to Sydney to work at the union's head office. His abrasive style made him many enemies, notably the federal Labor politician Clyde Cameron. He kept the AWU apart from the rest of the union movement, and refused to join the Australian Council of Trade Unions (ACTU), which he regarded as under Communist influence, until 1967. Despite his conservative views, in 1955 he threw the AWU's weight behind the Labor leader H. V. Evatt in his battle with B. A. Santamaria's "Movement" forces. Although a right-winger, Dougherty was a Presbyterian and disliked the Catholic influence that Santamaria represented. He also suspected that Santamaria's forces were trying to gain control of the AWU.

Dougherty was regarded even by his enemies as a very effective trade union leader, and he built the AWU up to be largest and wealthiest union in Australia, with 180,000 members in the 1950s. He helped to make Australian shearers the highest paid in the world. The AWU's industrial muscle kept Communist influence out of the union and made both employers and other unions wary of antagonising the AWU. Dougherty stated in 1954 that "The Australian Workers Union bars communists from admission."

=== Support for the White Australia Policy ===
Tom Dougherty in the same interview proclaimed that the Union also bars "Asiatics and Kanakas from membership." highlighting his long-term advocacy for the White Australia Policy; in the same article he referred to the Australian Workers Union as the 'spearhead' of the 'White Australia Forces' which sought to the repatriation of coloured labourers. Dougherty argued that the Communist Party's interest in ending the White Australia Policy was in 'conformity' with instructions from the Communist International. further he tabled a motion in the Union's executive council directing the union to oppose "attempts being made by a strange combination of certain wealthy employing interests and the Communist Party to secure the free entry of coloured and Asiatic labour into Australia."

=== Visit to the United States ===
In 1950, at the height of the Cold War, Dougherty visited the United States at the invitation of the American Federation of Labor and addressed its convention in Houston, calling for the end of all trade with the Soviet Union. In 1953 he and Laurie Short, leader of the Federated Ironworkers' Association, met with U.S. Vice-president Richard Nixon and briefed him on what they claimed was the continuing strength of Communism in the Australian unions.

=== Later life ===
In September 1957, Dougherty was chosen to be a Labor member of the NSW Legislative Council (then indirectly elected by the Legislative Assembly). He had long believed that the council should be abolished, and had criticised the NSW Labor Party for failing to carry out this policy. He promised to resign if he failed to abolish the council. Following the defeat of a 1961 referendum to abolish it, he carried out this promise and resigned. In his last years he was a strong supporter of Gough Whitlam in his battles with the Labor left, but he did not live to see the election of the Whitlam government, dying of a sudden heart attack during the 1972 election campaign.

Trade union offices
Preceded by Beecher Hay	General Secretary of the Australian Workers' Union; 1944 – 1972	Succeeded by Frank Mitchell
