= Bernard Riley (politician) =

Australian politician (1912–1978)

Bernard Blomfield Riley QC (21 July 1912 – 4 August 1978) was an Australian politician.

He was born in Cairns, Queensland to mill manager Bernard Rocks Riley and Isabelle Marion Murphy. He was educated at The King's School in Parramatta and then attended Oxford University, where he received a Bachelor of Arts in 1934 and a Master of Arts in 1951. Called to the bar at Gray's Inn in 1935 and in New South Wales in 1936, he worked as a barrister. On 15 December 1941 he married Stephanie Marguerite Day, with whom he had two children. In 1960, he was appointed a Queen's Counsel. From 1968 to 1973, he was a Liberal member of the New South Wales Legislative Council; he resigned in 1973 to become a judge of the Federal Court of Bankruptcy. In 1977, he was appointed to the Federal Court, but he died in Sydney the following year.
