= Patrick Grace (politician) =

Australian politician

The Honourable Patrick Grace M.L.C.
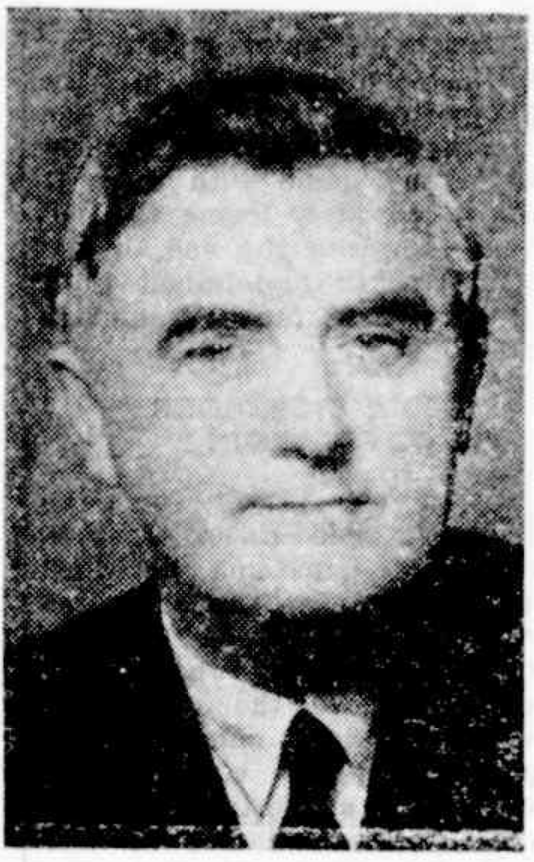

Member of the New South Wales Legislative Council
- In office 1952–1964
- Preceded by: John Ferguson

Secretary of the Yanco branch of the Australian Labor Party

Personal details
- Born: Patrick Raphael Grace; 31 October 1900 Corowa, New South Wales, Australia
- Died: 6 January 1975 (aged 74) Yanco, New South Wales, Australia
- Party: Labor (until 1959); Independent Labor Group (from 1959)
- Spouse: Eileen Clayton (m. 1930)
- Children: 3
- Parents: John Grace (father); Jane Elizabeth Maher (mother)
- Education: Yanco Public School

Patrick Raphael Grace (31 October 1900 – 6 January 1975) was an Australian politician.

== Early life ==
Born in Corowa to farmer John Grace and Jane Elizabeth Maher, he was educated at Yanco Public School and worked on his father's farm as a roadmaker, opening as a stock and station agent in 1920.

== Career ==
He was secretary of the Yanco branch of the Labor Party, and also entered a partnership with a butchery.

In 1952 he was elected to the New South Wales Legislative Council to replace John Ferguson who had resigned to take up a role as Chairman of the New South Wales Milk Board.

In 1959 he was expelled from the party for opposing the bill to abolish the Legislative Council; he was subsequently a member of the Independent Labor Group. Grace left the Council in 1964.

== Personal life ==
Grace married Eileen Clayton on 15 October 1930. The two had three children, two daughters and one son.

Grace was a Roman Catholic.

== Later life and death ==
Grace died in 1975 in Yanco. His funeral was held at Leeton Cemetery from St Patrick's Roman Catholic church in Yanco.
