= Peter Fallon (politician) =

Australian politician

Peter Fallon (23 February 1881 – 9 February 1956) was an Australian politician.

He was born in Tamworth to brickmaker Joseph Patrick Fallon and Mary Ann Riley. He was a tailor, and was involved in the foundation of the Tailors' Union, serving as president in 1904. On 11 April 1910 he married Agnes Roche, with whom he had four children. He was state secretary of the Federated Clothing and Allied Trades Union from 1923 to 1955. From 1952 to 1956 he was a Labor member of the New South Wales Legislative Council. He died at St Leonards in 1956.
