= Trevor Gordon (politician) =

Australian politician (1910–1990)

Trevor Everett Gordon (9 February 1910 – 3 April 1990) was a union organiser and member of the New South Wales Legislative Council.

Born in Scotland in 1910, he emigrated to Australia in his youth. He became an organiser of the Federated Storeman and Packers' Union, rising to secretary of the NSW branch of the union around 1968. He was active in the Labor Party, becoming President of the Ryde branch and a member of the central executive from 1958 until 1964.

On 21 May 1964 he became a member of the Legislative Council. Gordon was elected by members of the Legislative Assembly and the Legislative Council, to fill a casual vacancy caused by the death of Liberal member Henry Thompson.

Gordon died at Ryde on 3 April 1990 (aged 80).
