= Leicester Saddington =

Australian politician

Leicester Birkenhead Saddington OBE (27 July 1912 – 26 September 1962) was an Australian politician.

He was born at Mayfield to insurance broker Percy Saddington and Clara Birkenhead. He attended school in Cooks Hill and became an insurance broker, eventually becoming director of the family firm. On 10 April 1937 he married Claire Hogarth, with whom he had three children. He served in the Newcastle National Emergency Services during World War II. From 1952 to 1962 he was a Liberal member of the New South Wales Legislative Council. Appointed an Officer of the Order of the British Empire in 1960, he died in Newcastle, from a Heart attack, in 1962 with his ashes interred at Christ Church Cathedral, Newcastle.
