= William Walmsley (politician) =

Australian politician

William Arthur Walmsley (2 December 1892 – 18 January 1978) was an Australian politician.

He was born at Foxground near Kiama to dairy farmer William Arthur Walmsley and Mary Jane Williams. He was educated at Eltham and Lismore. On 14 December 1921 he married Adelaide Helena Frith, with whom he had two daughters. He was a director and later managing director of the Car Owners' Mutual Insurance Company in Lismore, and was also a dairy farmer. He served on Lismore City Council from 1947 to 1957, and from 1952 to 1964 was a Country Party member of the New South Wales Legislative Council. Walmsley died in 1978.
