= John Guthrie Paterson =

Australian politician (1902–1986)

John Guthrie Paterson (18 May 1902 – 18 May 1986) was an Australian politician who was a member of the Legislative Council.

He was born at Northcote, Victoria, the son for Jessie Fitzpatrick and John Paterson. He and attended school at The Scots College in Sydney before studying at the University of Sydney. He became an accountant, company director and grazier, owning a large property near Barrington Tops. On 15 June 1926 he married Bessie Smith and they had two daughters.

He was a member of the state executive of the Liberal Party from 1957 until 1961 and was the country vice-president in 1966.

On 23 April 1958 he became a member of the Legislative Council. Paterson was elected by members of the Legislative Assembly and the Legislative Council, who, every three years elected a quarter of the Legislative Council. He served on the Legislative Council until 22 April 1970.

Paterson died in Lane Cove on 18 May 1986 (aged 84).
