= Dick Evans (politician) =

Australian politician

Richard Kelynack Evans

Member of the New South Wales Legislative Council
- In office 28 August 1969 – 5 November 1978

Personal details
- Born: 3 April 1922 Sydney, New South Wales
- Died: 5 June 2008 (aged 86) Erina, New South Wales
- Party: Liberal Party
- Spouse: Beryl Evans (m. 1976; died 2006)

Military service
- Allegiance: Australia
- Branch/service: Royal Australian Air Force
- Years of service: 1941–1945
- Rank: Flying Officer
- Battles/wars: Second World War
- Awards: Distinguished Flying Cross

Richard Kelynack Evans, DFC (3 April 1922 – 5 June 2008) was an Australian politician who was born in Sydney to grazier Robert Fitzgerald Evans and Helen Madge Kelynack.

He was educated at The King's School in Parramatta and became a grazier at Rylstone, with additional property in Queensland.

From 1941 to 1945 he served in the Royal Australian Air Force as a fighter pilot, being awarded the Distinguished Flying Cross in 1945. From 1959 to 1969 he was a member of Rylstone Shire Council, serving as president from 1961 to 1969 and from 1979 to 1986. In 1969 he was elected to the New South Wales Legislative Council as a Liberal Party member; he served until 1978. From 1981 to 1986 he was Vice-President of the Liberal Party in New South Wales. Evans died at Erina in 2008.

Evans married twice. His first marriage took place on 3 April 1946 and was to Joan Fawcett, with whom he would have five children. His second wife was Beryl Bowman, whom he married on 30 July 1976. She would go on to serve in the Legislative Council from 1984 to 1995.
