= Gertrude Melville =

Australian politician

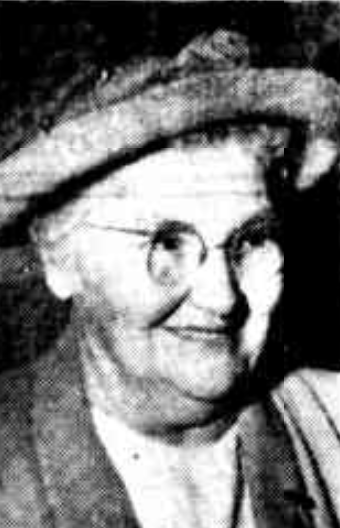
- Born: 7 October 1884; Port Macquarie
- Died: 21 August 1959 (aged 74); Little Bay, New South Wales
- Burial place: Randwick
- Political party: New South Wales Labor Party
- Children: 5

Gertrude Mary Melville (née Day; 7 October 1884 – 21 August 1959) was an Australian politician of the Labor Party. In 1952 she was elected to the New South Wales Legislative Council.

== Life and career ==
Melville was born Gertrude Mary Day on 7 October 1884 to parents John Joseph Day, a sawyer, and Mary Ann Dunbar in Port Macquarie, New South Wales. She moved to Sydney to attend the St Peter's convent school in the inner-city suburb of Surry Hills. In 1903 she married Arthur Melville, a New Zealand labourer, with whom she had five sons.

Melville became a member of the Labor Party (ALP) in 1904 and campaigned extensively with other party members for women and children's rights. In the periods of 1922–26 and 1950–52, she was a member of the party's central executive committee. She stood as an ALP candidate for the Eastern Suburbs district in the 1925 NSW election, but was unsuccessful. She was again unsuccessful in the 1932 election for Hurstville. Throughout the 1940s, she worked as a justice of the peace, a member of the New South Wales Board of Health, an alderman of the Cabramatta and Canley Vale municipal council, vice-president of the Country Women's Association's Cabramatta branch, and director of Fairfield Hospital. She was the Mayor of Cabramatta–Canley Vale from 1945 to 1948.

In 1952 Melville was nominated by Labor to fill a vacancy in the New South Wales Legislative Council caused by the death of Liberal member Ernest Farrar. At the time seats in the council were elected at a joint sitting of both houses of parliament. Melville was re-elected to a twelve-year term in 1957. In her five years in the council, she earned a reputation as the "grand old lady of the Labor Party". She dedicated her time in parliament to being a "spokesman for the women" and "the little people", supporting equal pay for women, child welfare, housing and hospitals.

She died on 21 August 1959 in Little Bay, Sydney, and was buried in Randwick.
