= Colin Begg (politician) =

Australian politician and judge

Colin Elly Begg QC (31 January 1917 – 9 September 1984) was an Australian politician and judge.

He was born in Sydney to electrical engineer Colin Erle Begg and Bertha Zadi. He first attended Sydney Grammar School. His final year of secondary education was at North Sydney Boys High School. He studied law at the University of Sydney, being admitted as a solicitor in 1940, and was first employed by John Corcoran and Company at 2 York Street Sydney. During World War II he served in the AIF, gaining the rank of lieutenant and being mentioned in despatches. On 17 November 1943 he married Ruth Lehmkull, with whom he had five children. He was called to the bar in 1946 and appointed Queen's Counsel in 1958. In 1955 he was elected to the New South Wales Legislative Council for the Liberal Party. He resigned in 1964 to take up an appointment on the New South Wales Supreme Court. Begg died at Darling Point in 1984.
