= Lloyd Sommerlad =

Australian politician

Ernest Lloyd Sommerlad (12 April 1919 – 17 April 2014) was an Australian politician.

He was born at Tenterfield to Ernest Christian Sommerlad, also a politician. He attended Sydney Grammar School and then the University of Sydney, where he received a Bachelor of Arts (1940) and a Bachelor of Economics (1946). During World War II he was an instructor of the Light Anti Aircraft School in Dutch New Guinea, holding the rank of captain. On 6 February 1943 he married Mavis Dorothy Patterson, with whom he had three children. On his return he was secretary of the New South Wales Country Press Association, and directed a number of commercial broadcasting companies. From 1955 to 1967 he was a Country Party member of the New South Wales Legislative Council. He died in Sydney in 2014.
