= Ralph Marsh =

Australian trade union leader and politician

Marsh in 1977

Ralph Benson Marsh OBE (3 September 1909 – 9 May 1989) was an Australian trade union leader and politician. He served as Secretary of the Labor Council of New South Wales from 1967 to 1975 and as a member of the Legislative Council from 1962 to 1976.

== Early life ==
Ralph was born in Newcastle, New South Wales on 30 September 1909, the son of Hugh Marsh and Jane Ann, née Benson. His father was a marine engineer for the Department of Public Works, and Ralph was raised and educated at Nambucca Heads, New South Wales. In 1926, at the age of 17 he became an apprentice boilermaker at the Eveleigh Railway Workshops.

== Career ==
After completing his apprenticeship Marsh struggled to find work due to the Depression, but eventually gained work on the railways at West Narrabri. In 1940 he transferred to the railway workshops at Chullora in Sydney, becoming a delegate for the Boilermakers' Society of Australia. Marsh was elected to a full-time position as the secretary-treasurer of the Redfern Branch of the Boilermakers' Society.

Marsh was prominent in the Industrial Groups active within the Australian labor movement at the time, made up of primarily Catholic, right-wing unionists opposed to the influence of communists in the union movement. Marsh (who converted to Catholicism following his marriage in 1933) was elected to the central executive of the New South Wales branch of the Labor Party in 1952 with the support of the 'Groupers'. Despite this Marsh did not leave the Labor Party in 1955 when most members of the industrial groups split off to form the Democratic Labor Party.

In 1957 Marsh was elected as an organiser for the Labor Council of New South Wales, the peak representative body for trade unions in the state. Shortly after in 1958 he became assistant secretary and then Secretary of the labor council following Robert A. King's death. During this time he also served on the executive of the Australian Council of Trade Unions, including a period as junior vice-president.

In 1962 he was elected to fill a vacancy in the Legislative Council, the upper house of the state parliament. He would continue to sit in the legislative council until 1976.

Marsh died at Bankstown on 9 May 1989.

Trade union offices
Preceded by James Kenny	Secretary of the Labor Council of New South Wales; 1967 - 1975	Succeeded by John Ducker
