= Lindsay North =

Australian politician

Lindsay Annan North AM (26 August 1911 – 27 April 1984) was an Australian politician.

Born in Cooktown in Queensland to bank manager Charles Roger North and Florence Victoria Lindsay, he was educated in Brisbane, Toowoomba and Bribie Island before becoming a wool classer and shop assistant. On 30 April 1938 he married Dorothy Morris, with whom he had a daughter. Having moved to New South Wales, he joined the Labor Party (ALP) in 1943 and was secretary of the Abbotsford branch from 1943 to 1966; that year he also became an organizer with the Australian Textile Workers' Union (ATWU). From 1952 to 1956 and from 1961 to 1964 he was secretary of the federal electorate council for the seats of Martin and Evans and was general returning officer for the ALP, the Australian Council of Trade Unions and the Trades and Labor Council. North was elected to the New South Wales Legislative Council in 1964. He became secretary and federal president of the ATWU in 1972. North left the Legislative Council in 1976. Following his retirement Lindsay North became heavily involved in Australian Tennis and the operation of the Australian Open at White City in Sydney. He was responsible for the distribution or payment of the prize money to the players. Later in his life he married Faye North, and had two children. He died in Cairns in 1984.
