= Robert Savage (Australian politician) =

Australian politician (1895–1959)

Robert Emmet Savage (16 March 1895 – 2 July 1959) was an Australian politician.

He was born in Enmore to ex-Irish seaman William Savage and Mary McCarthy. He attended Christian Brothers' College in Balmain and became a clerk with the Metropolitan Board of Water Supply. He was also an organiser with the Sewerage Employees' Association, serving as assistant secretary from 1929 to 1943 and as secretary from 1955 to 1959. On 22 April 1935, he married Philomena Meany, with whom he had two daughters. He was a Labor member of the New South Wales Legislative Council from 1931 to 1934 and returned in 1943 to fill a casual vacancy caused by the death of E. M. Mitchell KC. He continued to serve until 1959, when he died in Lane Cove.
