= Gerald Rygate =

Australian politician

Gerald Blake Rygate (24 February 1895 – 8 June 1960) was an Australian politician.

Born at Grenfell to medical doctor Robert Edward Rygate, he was educated at St Ignatius College, Riverview. He also studied medicine subsequently joining the Irrigation Commission as a clerk in Leeton, NSW. Granted extended leave Rygate enlisted in the AIF in August 1915. He served in Egypt and France, was wounded in action and was twice mentioned in despatches.

On his return he farmed at Canowindra. On 7 February 1923 he married Amelia Rice, with whom he had a son.

A Labor Party member since 1912, he was prominent in local politics and sports administration, served as coroner, and actively promoted returned servicemen's welfare causes.

He was elected to the New South Wales Legislative Council in 1952. In 1959 he was expelled from the party for voting against the abolition of the Legislative Council, and became associated with the Independent Labor Group. In failing health, his attendance in the Council diminished in 1960 and he died in June at Waverley. His widow Amelia entered the Legislative Council in 1961.
