= Fred Bowen =

Australian politician

Fred William Bowen OBE (22 September 1906 – 27 October 1980) was an Australian politician.

He was born in Sydney to polisher Fred Williams Bowen and Georgina Brown. He was educated at Orange Grove, Leichhardt and Petersham and became an upholsterer. He was active in the union movement, having joined the Australian Labor Party in 1923. On 10 October 1936 he married Edna Laurie Moore, with whom he had three sons. A member of the Furnishing Trades Society of New South Wales, he was assistant secretary in 1948 and secretary from 1951 to 1977, as well as president from 1944 to 1945. From 1958 to 1965 he was vice-president of the Labor Council, and from 1965 to 1975 he was president of that body. He was a Labor member of the New South Wales Legislative Council from 1966 to 1976. Bowen died in Lane Cove in 1980.
