= Leo Connellan (politician) =

Australian politician (1913–1998)

The Honourable Leo Connellan

Member of the New South Wales Legislative Council
- In office 1969 – 1981

President of Balranald Shire Council
- In office 1959 – 1975

Personal details
- Born: Leo Paul Connellan; 28 June 1913 Donald, Victoria, Australia
- Died: 9 April 1998 (aged 84) Balranald, New South Wales
- Party: Country Party
- Spouse: Sybil Buzza (m. 1940)
- Children: 8
- Education: Xavier College
- Occupation: Politician, grazier

Leo Paul Connellan (28 June 1913 in Donald, Victoria – 9 April 1998 in Balranald) was an Australian politician. He was a Country Party member of the New South Wales Legislative Council from 1969 to 1981.

Connellan was born in Donald, Victoria, to grazier Thomas Peter Connellan and Lucy Glowrey. He was educated at Xavier College in Melbourne, and worked as a grazier in the Balranald area of New South Wales. He married Sybil Buzza on 27 June 1940, with whom he had eight children. As a member of the Country Party, he served as President of Balranald Shire Council from 1959 to 1975. He was chairman of the central executive of the Country Party in 1974, having been a member of the federal executive since 1972.

Connellan was elected to the New South Wales Legislative Council in 1969, and served until 1981. He died in 1998 at Balranald.
