= Harry Sullivan (politician) =

Australian politician

Henry Joseph Aloysius Sullivan (5 June 1921 – 28 April 1977) was an Australian politician.

He was born in Moree to William Sullivan and Mary Bedford, and was educated at a local convent. He entered the workforce at fourteen as a post office messenger, eventually becoming a partner in a real estate agency and then a newspaper proprietor. From 1942 to 1945 he served in New Guinea with the AIF. On 30 July 1949 he married Mary Finn, with whom he had five children. From 1968 to 1970 he was president of the New South Wales Country Press Association. He entered the New South Wales Legislative Council in 1970; although he had no party affiliation at the time, he later joined the Country Party in 1974. Sullivan died at Darlinghurst in 1977.
