= Robert Wilson (Australian politician) =

Australian politician

Sir Robert Christian Wilson CMG (11 November 1896 – 21 August 1973) was an Australian politician.

He was born in Mudgee to grazier Henry Christian Wilson and Mary Hales. He attended Fort Street High School and served during World War I with the 1st Light Horse Regiment. He became a businessman, working as general manager of the Graziers' Co-operative Shearing Company from 1924 to 1961. On 7 May 1932 he married Gertrude Brooks in Boston in the United States; they had three children. He was a Country Party member of the New South Wales Legislative Council from 1949 to 1961. He was appointed Companion of the Order of St Michael and St George in 1952 and knighted in 1966. Wilson died in Cairns in 1973.
