= Harry Gardiner (politician) =

Australian politician (1907–1974)

The Honourable Harry Gardiner

Member of the New South Wales Legislative Council
- In office 15 September 1960 – 8 April 1974
- Preceded by: Gerald Rygate
- Succeeded by: Bob Scott

Chairman of the Sydney County Council
- In office 24 January 1938 – January 1939
- Preceded by: Arthur McElhone
- Succeeded by: Stanley Parry

Mayor of Redfern
- In office 31 December 1934 – 10 January 1936
- Preceded by: John Joseph Castle
- Succeeded by: Joseph Malachi Gilmore

Alderman on the Redfern Municipal Council
- In office 2 January 1932 – 6 December 1941
- Constituency: Redfern Ward

Personal details
- Born: 25 May 1907 Redfern, New South Wales, Australia
- Died: 8 April 1974 (aged 66) Sydney, Australia

John Henry Gardiner (25 May 1907 – 8 April 1974) was an Australian politician, who served as a Member of the Legislative Council of New South Wales, Mayor of Redfern and Chairman of the Sydney County Council.

== Early life and career ==
He was born in Redfern to businessman Edward Felix Gardiner. He was educated at Haberfield Public School and Fort Street High School before becoming a motor parts manufacturer. Around 1928 he married Dora Elizabeth Saunders, with whom he had three children.

== Political career ==
In January 1932, Gardiner was first elected as a Labor Party candidate to a seat on Redfern Ward of the Redfern Municipal Council and soon rose to be mayor of the council in December 1934. Gardiner was appointed mayor by the Minister for Local Government, Eric Spooner, which was due to the deadlocked nature of the council, which was split equally between Labor and independents, and the council up until then had been unable to settle on a candidate for mayor. Taking office as mayor at age 26, Gardiner was the youngest mayor in Sydney and served until January 1936. Gardiner continued to serve on Redfern council until his defeat at the December 1941 elections.

In August 1935, Gardiner was elected to the No.2 Constituency of the Sydney County Council and faced an unsuccessful legal challenge from his main conservative opponent, who disputed the results. In January 1938, he was elected chairman of the county council and served for a single term. Defeated as a county councillor in 1945, Gardiner was elected in September 1947 to fill a vacancy in the council caused by the retirement of Stanley Parry. He served on the county council until the election in February 1949 when he was defeated, along with many other Labor councillors.

From 1960 to 1974 he was a member of the New South Wales Legislative Council, during which time he was associated with the Independent Labor Group. Gardiner died in office in 1974.

Civic offices
Preceded by John Joseph Castle	Mayor of Redfern; 1934–1936	Succeeded by Joseph Malachi Gilmore
Government offices
Preceded by Arthur McElhone	Chairman of the Sydney County Council; 1938–1939	Succeeded by Stanley Parry
Parliament of New South Wales
Preceded by Gerald Rygate	Member of the New South Wales Legislative Council; 1960 – 1974	Succeeded by Bob Scott
