= John Kenny (politician) =

Australian politician

John Lesley Kenny (21 June 1889 – 19 June 1978) was an Australian politician.

He was born at Port Macquarie and worked as a plumber. A Labor Party member from around 1906, he was secretary and president of the Port Macquarie branch and a local alderman from 1959 to 1964. In 1955 he was elected to the New South Wales Legislative Council as a Labor member. He was expelled from the party in 1959 for opposing the abolition of the Legislative Council, and was thereafter associated with the Independent Labor Group. Kenny left the Council in 1970 and died at Port Macquarie in 1978.
