= Robert Arthur King =

Australian politician

Robert Arthur King (9 April 1886 – 27 February 1960) was an Australian politician.

He was born in Launceston to tailor Robert King and Louisa Barrett. He was educated at private schools and became a saddler, moving to New South Wales around 1916. In that year he married Florence May Mullins, with whom he had two daughters. He was closely involved in the Saddlers' Union and was also active in the Trades and Labor Council. King was appointed to the New South Wales Legislative Council in 1931, and played an active part in the turmoil in Labor politics throughout the subsequent decade. He was expelled from the Labor Party in 1936 and became associated with Bob Heffron's Industrial Labor Party. Readmitted to the formal Labor Party in 1939, he also served as vice-president of the Australian Council of Trade Unions from 1935 to 1960. King died in Sydney in 1960 while still serving in parliament.
