= Herb McPherson =

Australian politician

Herbert John McPherson (9 February 1917 – 15 December 1994) was an Australian politician and a Labor member of the New South Wales Legislative Council from 1964 to 1981. He was Deputy Leader of the Opposition in the council from 1972 to 1973.

Born in Ganmain, McPherson was the son of master butcher John McPherson and Josephine Ledger. He was educated at rural schools around Wagga Wagga, and began working at a butcher's shop at the age of fourteen. He enlisted in the AIF in 1940, serving until 1946, and served with the Citizen Military Forces from 1948 to 1960, rising to the rank of Major. He married Lorna Ellis on 7 May 1943, with whom he had four children. He became a master butcher in Wagga Wagga in 1951, and was also a farmer. He was an alderman on Wagga Wagga Council from 1956 to 1959.

McPherson joined the Australian Labor Party in 1957 and was a president of both state and federal electoral councils. In 1964 he was elected to the New South Wales Legislative Council. He became Deputy Leader of the Opposition in the Legislative Council in 1972, but in 1973 moved to the position of Temporary Chairman of Committees, which he held until 1978. He left the Legislative Council in 1981. McPherson died in Wagga Wagga in 1994.
