= Evelyn Barron =

Australian politician

Evelyn Barron, née Bock (24 November 1898 – 17 January 1985), an Australian politician, was a member of the New South Wales Legislative Council from 1963 to 1976 representing the Labor Party.

She was born Evelyn Bock in Wallaroo, South Australia to blacksmith Frederick Bock and his wife, Daisy Melville. She was educated at Wallaroo Public School and later married George Barron, a bricklayer, in 1927 and together they had a son and a daughter.

Barron became active in the Labor Party in 1938 and was a member of state and federal electorate councils, the Central Executive (between 1957 and 1964) and was also President of the Women's Central Organising Committee. Prior to entering political office, she was president of the New South Wales Women's Justices Association; active in Civilian Widows' Association; a member of Good Neighbour Council; president of the (Australian) League of Women Voters; a member of New South Wales National Council of Women; and active in the movement for Australia Women's Charter.

She was elected to the New South Wales Legislative Council in 1964. In the Legislative Council she questioned what the government was doing to increase the representation of women on juries, a long-held concern of the Women Justices Association of NSW. In reply, Mr Fuller Vice-president of the Executive Council reported that in 1972 1,523 women were enrolled on jury lists in a total of 83,882.

Barron left the Council in 1976, and became a member of the New South Wales Ambulance Board. Barron died in 1985 in Hurstville.
