= Herbert Henley =

Australian politician

Herbert Sydney Henley (27 October 1889 – 4 October 1966) was an Australian politician.

He was born in Balmain, the son of Sir Thomas Henley and Charlotte Smith. He attended Sydney Grammar School and Hawkesbury Agricultural College, becoming a farmer near Cowra. On 15 February 1919 he married Stella Evans, with whom he had two sons. He served on Waugoola Shire Council from 1920 to 1922 (as president) and from 1935 to 1941. From 1937 to 1964 he served as a Country Party member of the New South Wales Legislative Council. Henley died at Manly in 1966.
