= Donald Cochrane (politician) =

Australian politician

Donald Vincent Cochrane (17 February 1904 – 29 January 1985) was an Australian politician.

Born in Charters Towers to engine driver Robert Henry Cochrane and Levinia Mary Yeo, the family moved to Sydney in 1908. Cochrane was educated at Marrickville and worked at his father's returned serviceman's block in Tarcutta. In 1920 he joined the Labor Party. He worked in New South Wales and Queensland until the Depression, and was later in the battery-manufacturing business. In 1933 he was elected to Marrickville Municipal Council, of which he was mayor in 1944 (he would serve on council until 1957). On 10 January 1943 he married Ruth Nuttal, with whom he had a son. In 1950 he was elected to the New South Wales Legislative Council as a Labor member, but in 1959 he was expelled from the party for opposing the council's abolition; he subsequently joined the Independent Labor Group of like-minded former Labor MLCs. He left the Council in 1964. An atheist, Cochrane died at Ocean Shores in 1985.

Civic offices
Preceded by Francis Buckley	Mayor of Marrickville; 1943 – 1944	Succeeded by William Murray
