= Robert Mahony =

Irish-born Australian politician (1872–1961)

Personal details
- Born: 3 February 1872; Cork, Ireland
- Died: 31 October 1961 (aged 89)
- Political party: Australian Labor Party
- Relations: William Mahony (brother)

Robert Mahony (3 October 1872 – 8 February 1961) was an Irish-born Australian politician.

== Biography ==
He was born on 3 October February 1872, in Cork to shipwright William Mahony and Bridget Manning. The family migrated to Sydney in 1877 and Robert was educated at a Balmain convent before becoming a boilermaker. In July 1895, he married Margaret Jane Mahony, with whom he had eight children. President of the Balmain Labour League in 1891, he was foundation secretary of the Ship, Painters and Dockers' Union in 1900 and was general secretary of the federated union from 1915 to 1945. He was active in the campaign against conscription during World War I, and was campaign director for John Storey. From 1921 to 1961, he was a Labor member of the New South Wales Legislative Council, serving as party whip from 1922 to 1961. Mahony died in Balmain on 8 February 1961.

His brother, William Mahony, was also a politician.
