= Harry Cockerill (politician) =

Australian politician (1899–1987)

Francis Henry Cockerill (5 July 1899 – 8 August 1987) was an Australian politician.

He was born at Greta to miner Francis William Cockerill and Edith Maria Wheatley. He attended school at Kurri Kurri and Cockerill became a miner at Branxton. On 14 July 1923 he married Dorothy Morley, with whom he had four children. He was active in the mining unions, and also served on Kearsley Shire Council from 1947 to 1950. From 1959 to 1973 he was a Labor member of the New South Wales Legislative Council, having previously served on the Labor central executive from 1950 to 1952 and from 1955 to 1959. Cockerill died at Cardiff in 1987.
