= George Bassett (Australian politician) =

Australian politician

George Douglas Bassett

Member of the New South Wales Legislative Council
- In office 1932–1964

Personal details
- Born: 28 January 1888 Campbell Forest, Victoria, Australia
- Died: 19 March 1972 (aged 84) Sydney, New South Wales, Australia
- Party: Country Party
- Spouse: Elizabeth Breen
- Children: 5

George Douglas Bassett (28 January 1888 – 19 March 1972) was an Australian politician.

He was born at Campbell Forest near Bendigo to farmer William Bassett and Jane Irvine. He was educated at Bendigo and then at Canowindra, where he worked for his father on the family farm. From around 1911 he had his own farm near Forbes, and he also subsequently owned property at Cumboogle, Dubbo and Collie. On 12 July 1911 he married Elizabeth Breen, with whom he had five children. From 1932 to 1964 he was a Country Party member of the New South Wales Legislative Council. Bassett died in Sydney in 1972.
