= Charles Hackett (politician) =

Australian politician

Charles Hackett (28 January 1889 – 13 February 1976) was an Australian politician.

He was born at Ultimo to labourer Charles Hackett and Helen Ferguson. He was an employee of Sydney City Council for many years. On 10 June 1922 he married Mary Doyle, with whom he had five children. A long-time Labor Party member, he was secretary of the Pyrmont Denison branch and served on the central executive from 1920 to 1921, 1931 to 1939 and 1941 to 1944. In 1943 he was elected to the New South Wales Legislative Council. Expelled from the Labor Party in 1959 for voting against the abolition of the Legislative Council, he became involved with the Independent Labor Group. He was defeated in 1964 and retired from politics. Hackett died in 1976 in Sydney.
