= Robert Day (Australian politician) =

Australian politician

Robert Lyndon Day (10 May 1886 – 16 July 1968) was an Australian politician.

He was born in Melbourne to compositor George Day and Mary Ann Campbell. He was educated at Preston and Northcote and was an apprentice sailor by the age of thirteen. He deserted his ship in the United States, and five years later returned to Australia, becoming a canecutter in Cairns. On 19 September 1911 he married Annie Patience, with whom he had five children. He later became a railway and tramway worker, first at Ipswich and then in Sydney. From 1918 he was president of the New South Wales branch of the Federated Rubber and Allied Workers Union, and from 1925 to 1955 he was federal president. From 1953 to 1967 he was a Labor member of the New South Wales Legislative Council. Day died in Sydney in 1968.
