= John Carter (Australian politician) =

Australian politician

John Markham Carter CBE MC (23 February 1893 – 6 December 1971) was an Australian politician.

He was born at Taungoo in Burma to police chief George Markham Strange Carter and his wife Augusta Laura. Following the early death of his father he was raised by his grandparents in England, where he attended Bloxham College. In 1912 he migrated to Australia and worked as a jackeroo near Brewarrina. From 1914 to 1919 he served with the Australian Imperial Force in the 7th Light Horse Regiment. He was at Gallipoli and also served in Palestine; he had the rank of lieutenant and was awarded the Military Cross. After the war he was a soldier settler, taking land at Gobarralong and later adding property near Gundagai. On 6 March 1924 he married Jean Margaret Weston, with whom he had three daughters. In 1950 he retired from farming to live in Sydney. A long-time member of the Country Party, he served on the central council from 1945 to 1971 and the central executive from 1949 to 1971; he was chairman of the executive from 1952 to 1957. From 1955 to 1968 he was a member of the New South Wales Legislative Council. Carter died at Hornsby in 1971.
