= Margaret Davis (politician) =

Australian politician (1933–2022)

Margaret Alayne Elizabeth Davis, née Alexander (23 September 1933 – 7 December 2022) was an Australian politician. She was a Liberal member of the New South Wales Legislative Council from 1967 to 1978.

She was the daughter of J. K. Alexander, a doctor, and Joan Abbott at Gilgandra, where she received her primary education. She then attended Abbotsleigh in Sydney and then the University of Sydney, becoming a pharmacist. On 10 March 1955 she married Neil Davis, with whom she had three children. She joined the Liberal Party around 1959, and sat on Bankstown Council from 1962 to 1963. In 1964 she was president of the Auburn branch of the Liberal Party.

In 1967, Davis was elected to the New South Wales Legislative Council as a Liberal member. She served until 15 September 1978, when she resigned just prior to the state election. Due to the reduction in the council's size, Davis was not included on the Coalition's ticket, but was instead endorsed to contest the Legislative Assembly seat of Waverley. She was defeated by the sitting Labor member, Syd Einfeld.
