= Samuel Williams (Australian politician) =

Australian politician

Samuel Connell Williams (1878 – 12 October 1962) was a Welsh-born Australian politician.

He was born in Pontypridd to station master Connell Williams and Annie Williams. At a young age he worked in the Rhondda Valley coal mines before going to sea with the Royal Navy around 1902, eventually settling in Fremantle, Western Australia in 1909. He became a diver and mariner, and in 1918 married Olive Elizabeth Harland, with whom he had a daughter. In 1924 he came to Sydney with a dredge and was employed by the Maritime Services Board. Long involved in the Labor Party and the union movement, he was state secretary of the Dredge and Maritime Service Employees Association from 1939 to 1957. From 1943 to 1962 he was a Labor member of the New South Wales Legislative Council. Williams died in Sydney in 1962.
