= Eileen Furley =

Australian politician

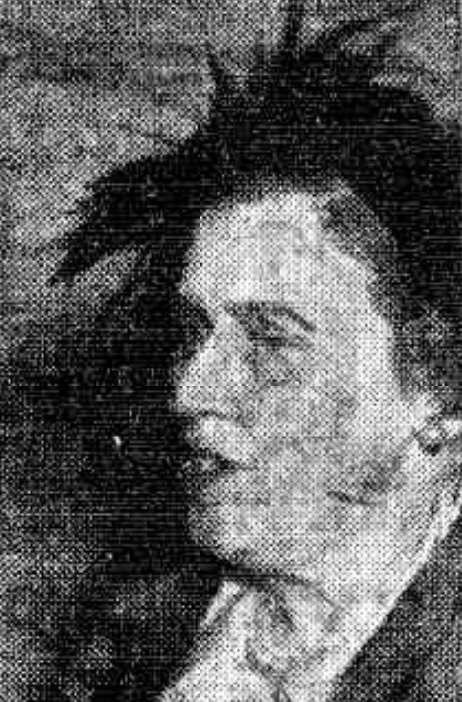
Eileen Furley OBE (1900-1985)

Mabel Eileen Furley OBE (née Llewelyn; 13 March 1900 – 20 September 1985) was the first woman to represent the Liberal Party in the New South Wales Legislative Council.

The only child of accountant Frederick John Griffith Llewelyn and Alice, née Thompson, Eileen was born in Mosman and educated there and at Glebe Point, afterwards working as a secretary. She married salesman Norman William Furley on 14 February 1931 at Roseville; they would be childless. She was officer-in-charge of sugar rationing in New South Wales from 1942 to 1945 and was also active in the Council for Women in War Work, the National Council of Women and the Food for Britain Fund, as well as superintendent of the Mosman National Emergency Services. She joined the Liberal Democratic Party in 1943 but, along with most of the LDP, joined the Liberal Party in 1945.

Furley was elected female vice-president of the federal Liberal Party in 1949 and was appointed Officer of the Order of the British Empire in 1954. She was chairman of the Liberals' Migrant Advisory Council from 1956 to 1976. In 1961, Furley defeated Senator John McCallum for the third spot on the Coalition's New South Wales Senate ticket but was defeated; the following year she was appointed to fill a casual vacancy in the New South Wales Legislative Council. In the Council she fought against a perception among her colleagues that she was a token thrust upon them by their lower house colleagues, embarrassed by the lack of Liberal women in politics. She would retire voluntarily in 1976.

In 1948 Furley had opposed a ban on the Communist Party, but in the 1960s she chaired an anti-communist committee dedicated to "exposing" the New South Wales Teachers' Federation. She devoted most of her energy to fighting "the deterioration of morals and behaviour of young people", advocating the teaching of sex education as part of "the training of the whole personality", which the Sydney Morning Herald argued could not halt the advances of permissiveness. Furley died in 1985 at Mosman and was cremated.
