= Stanley Eskell =

Australian politician

Chairman of Committees
- In office 2 August 1967 – 6 March 1969
- Preceded by: Ernest Gerard Wright
- Succeeded by: Thomas McKay

Member of the New South Wales Legislative Council
- In office 23 April 1958 – 5 November 1978

Personal details
- Born: 4 January 1918 Perth, Western Australia
- Died: 6 June 2000 (aged 82) London, England
- Party: Liberal Party

Military service
- Branch/service: Citizens Military Force
- Years of service: 1938–70
- Rank: Brigadier
- Commands: University of New South Wales Regiment (1955–58)
- Battles/wars: Second World War
- Awards: Efficiency Decoration; Mentioned in despatches

Stanley Louis Mowbray Eskell, ED (4 January 1918 – 6 June 2000) was an Australian politician.

He was born in Perth, Western Australia, to clerk Stanley Herbert Eskell and Muriel Kerr. He attended the Royal Military College, Duntroon and in 1939 was a lieutenant in the Staff Corps. From 1942 to 1945 he served in the Second Australian Imperial Force, being promoted to major and mentioned in despatches in 1942. In 1944 he went to the United States Army staff school at Fort Leavenworth, and for the remainder of the war was part of the Australian Military Mission in Washington, D.C. After the war he was managing director of a number of companies, and in 1958 he entered the New South Wales Legislative Council as a Liberal Party member. He was Government Whip from 1966 to 1967 and Chairman of Committees from 1967 to 1969.

Eskell married in Denise Rachel Yaffa on 18 December 1946. The relationship broke down and his wife sought a divorce which Eskell agreed to. Eskell admitted to adultery with Margaret Rose Cleary and the divorce was granted in 1962. The divorce became controversial in 1968 as a result of proceedings involving Alexander Armstrong, in which Justice Street found that Armstrong had helped Eskell procure false evidence of adultery. The council had voted to expel Armstrong in February 1969 for unrelated conduct. John Slattery QC advised there was no evidence to charge Eskell with perjury. Nonetheless the council voted to remove him from the position of Chairman of Committees. He was not expelled from the council and was elected to a second 12-year term in 1970. His term ended early in 1978 as part of the transition to a directly elected council and he did not seek re-election.

Eskell died in London on 6 June 2000 (aged 82).

New South Wales Legislative Council
Preceded by Ernest Wright	Chairman of Committees; 1967–1969	Succeeded by Thomas McKay
Military offices
Preceded by W. M. McGilvray	Commanding Officer of the University of New South Wales Regiment; 1955–1958	Succeeded by J. McCarty
