= Walter Geraghty =

Australian politician

Honorable Walter James Geraghty (25 May 1905 – 10 May 1996) was an Australian politician.

Born at Hunters Hill to builder Martin Joseph Geraghty and Lilian Frederika Roberts, he attended school locally and became an audit clerk and accountant, although he lost his job during the Great Depression. He married Grace Elsie Degan, with whom he had five children. In 1937 he joined the Labor Party and became an organiser of the Unemployment Relief Workers Association, later rising to state president and secretary from 1939 to 1941. He worked with the Commonwealth Department of Labour and National Service from 1941 to 1960 and was a member of the Labor Party's central executive from 1944 to 1957 and from 1958 to 1961. In 1961 he was elected to the New South Wales Legislative Council, where he served until 1978. Geraghty died at Hornsby in 1996.
