= Gavin Sutherland (politician) =

Australian politician

Gavin Hamilton Sutherland (15 February 1893 – 17 August 1970) was an Australian politician.

He was born in The Rocks to seaman and unionist William James Sutherland and schoolteacher Clara Dwyer. He attended St Patricks's Marist Brothers school in Church Hill before becoming a clerk in the Postmaster General's Department in 1911. He was a member of the Letter Carriers' Union and then the Ironworkers' Union before joining the Australian Workers' Union in 1918. On 1 May 1926 he married Sushanna Slatter. A Labor Party member from 1909, he served on the central executive from 1917 to 1921, 1926 to 1927 and 1931 to 1932, and on the federal executive from 1918 to 1920. In the 1930s he was associated with the federal Labor wing of the party, which supported Prime Minister James Scullin over Premier Jack Lang. From 1956 to 1970 he was a Labor member of the New South Wales Legislative Council, serving as opposition whip from 1966 to 1970. Sutherland died at Burwood in 1970.
