= Christopher Love (politician) =

Australian politician

Christopher Augustine Love (22 November 1884 – 7 April 1970) was an Australian politician.

He was born at Port Victoria, South Australia, to storekeeper William Love and Mary Ryan. He was educated in Melbourne and later moved to Sydney with his parents, becoming a French polisher. On 17 October 1918 he married Alice Ruth Knight, with whom he had five daughters. He had joined the Labor Party in 1912 and was secretary of its Enmore branch. He worked as a case maker at Glebe and Marrickville, and during World War II worked at the small arms factory in Lithgow. From 1955 to 1970 he was a Labor member of the New South Wales Legislative Council. He died at Waverley in 1970.
