= Leon Snider =

Australian politician

Leon Samuel Snider (1897 – 9 August 1965) was an Australian politician.

He was born in Melbourne to Polish immigrant fruit merchant Phillip Snider and Diare Rachel Pahl. He attended Scotch College and became a theatre proprietor, moving to Sydney in 1925. On 15 May 1930 he married Ruth Cohen, with whom he had three children. He was a partner in the film distribution company Snider and Dean, and also served on Woollahra Council from 1935 to 1948 (mayor in 1944). From 1943 to 1965 he was a member of the New South Wales Legislative Council, first as a member of the Liberal Party and from 1959 as a Country Party member. Snider died in Sydney in 1965.
