= Richard Henry Thompson =

Australian politician and preacher

Richard Henry Thompson M.L.C. (20 July 1906 – 21 March 1964) was an Australian politician and Methodist Lay Preacher.

He was born at Paeroa in New Zealand to miner Leslie Foster Thompson and Caroline Walker. His parents returned to Australia when he was two and he attended state schools before completing his education at Newington College (1922–1924). In his final year he was a member of the 1st XV Rugby, 1st VIII Rowing and 1st Debating Team. The Richard Thompson Memorial Debating Prize is awarded at Newington in his memory. After school he worked with Sun Newspapers Limited and later became a business consultant.

Thompson served as Chairman of City of Sydney Eisteddfod in 1946 and President of the Australian Debating Union from 1949 until 1964. He was a member of the council of Newington College from 1948 until 1964 and was President of the Old Newingtonians' Union in 1952 and 1953. He was a councillor of Leigh College and the Central Methodist Mission. Socially, he was a member of the Australian Club and was known as Laddie. On 19 March 1934 he married Constance Olive Mayhew, with whom he had two children.

From 1940 to 1964 he was a Liberal member of the New South Wales Legislative Council. Although he was re-elected for the term beginning in 1964, he died before parliament resumed at Balgowlah.
