= Edna Roper =

Australian politician (1913-1986)

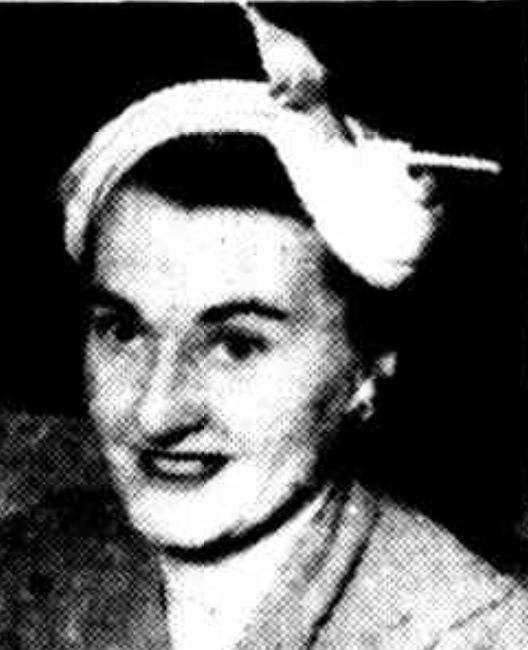
Edna Roper c1953

Edna Sirius Roper OBE (née Lorence; 21 July 1913 – 8 October 1986) was an Australian politician.

She was born in Alberton, South Australia, to sea captain Martin Lorence and Hilda Rose, née Arnold. She attended St Paul's Church of England School in Port Adelaide before working in her father's business. After moving to Victoria, she held various jobs including waitress, copyholder, shop assistant and jewellery maker. On 2 April 1932 she married Gilbert Roper, a linotype operator. In 1941, now living in Sydney, she joined the Labor Party and served as honorary secretary of the NSW Labor Women's Central Organising Committee (1949–57); she was also active in the East Sydney federal electorate council and was a member of the party's central executive from 1952 to 1958. In 1953 she was the first woman to be appointed to the board of Royal Prince Alfred Hospital and in 1961 of the Queen Victoria Memorial Hospital.

In 1958, Roper was elected to the New South Wales Legislative Council. She was the only female member of the council until 1959, when she was joined by Anne Press. She continued to be active in the community and especially in nursing, serving as a councillor of the Bush Nursing Association from 1961 to 1970 and on the committee of the St John's Ambulance Association in 1971. From 1973 to 1978 she was the Labor Party's deputy leader in the upper house. With the introduction of a directly elected council in 1978, Roper was one of many MLCs who retired. She died in 1986 at Leura.
