= Reginald Jackson (Australian politician) =

Australian politician (1897–1969)

Reginald Stanley Jackson (12 December 1897 – 16 August 1969) was an Australian politician.

He was born in Burwood, New South Wales to builder William Jackson and Harriet Cramp. He attended school locally and worked for the Hendersons confectionery company. From 1916 to 1917 he served in Gallipoli and France with the 53rd Battalion, but was invalided home. He returned to the confectionery trade, and on 15 November 1919 married Isabel Valentine, with whom he had a daughter. He had been a Labor Party member since 1914, and was also closely involved in the Federal Confectioners Association, serving as state secretary and federal president from 1940 to 1969. From 1950 to 1969 he was a Labor member of the New South Wales Legislative Council. Jackson died in Sydney in 1969.
