= Chris Dalton =

Australian politician

Christopher Alfred Dalton (27 November 1896 – 25 May 1975) was an Australian politician.

He was born at Teeyarra to teamster George Henry Dalton and Mary Grintell. He was educated at West Maitland and became a bushworker and railway worker. From 1916 to 1918 he served in the AIF with the 13th Battalion. On 19 November 1920 he married Rita Mary Jupp, with whom he had one son. An active member of the Railway Workers and General Labourers Association, he became federal vice-president and state president of the Australian Workers' Union from 1933 to 1938. A Labor Party member, he was on the central executive from 1941 to 1943. From 1943 to 1970 he was a Labor member of the New South Wales Legislative Council. Dalton died at Sydney in 1975.

His brother Tom Dalton was also a Labor politician.
