= Cedric Cahill =

Australian politician

Cedric Allan Francis Cahill QC (16 July 1912 – 9 November 1973) was an Australian politician.

He was born in Belmore to conveyancer Lionel Bernard Cahill and Florence Rose, née Dunn. He attended Marist Brothers College in Sydney and then studied law, being admitted as a solicitor in 1936 and working for Abe Landa's firm. He married Margaret McDonald on 23 December 1940; they had two children. Cahill was called to the Bar in 1949. In 1954 he was elected to the New South Wales Legislative Council as a Labor member; he had been an active member of the Labor Party since 1934, having served as president, secretary and treasurer of the State Electoral Conference. His served until 1973. He was appointed Queen's Counsel in 1963. Cahill (who was no relation to the State Premier Joseph Cahill) died at Manly in 1973.
