= Jim Kenny =

Australian glassworker, trade union official and politician

James Denis Kenny (27 November 1906 – 12 October 1967) was an Australian politician.

He was born in Waterloo to transport worker James Kenny and Margaret Rolley. Educated locally, he became a hatter until around 1930, when he became a glassworker. He was a shop steward for the Glassworkers' Union and served as its state secretary from 1936 to 1947 and federal secretary from 1950 to 1967. In 1946 he was president of the Trades and Labor Council, and from 1951 to 1967 he served on the executive of the Australian Council of Trade Unions. From 1948 to 1967 he was a Labor member of the New South Wales Legislative Council. Kenny died at Maroubra in 1967.
