= Amelia Rygate =

Australian politician

Amelia Elizabeth Mary Rygate, née Rice (27 January 1898 – 8 June 1988) was an Australian politician.

She was born at Canowindra to wheat farmer Albert Rice. She attended St Mary's College in Bathurst and was a member of the Dramatic and Musical Society during World War I, organising entertainment for serving soldiers. On 7 February 1923 she married Gerald Rygate and joined the Labor Party. During World War II she organised similar entertainment as during World War I.

Gerald Rygate was a member of the New South Wales Legislative Council from 1952 until his death in 1960. Not long after, in September 1961, Amelia was elected to the council as a nominee of the Independent Labor Group, which comprised those former Labor MLCs who opposed the party policy of abolishing the Legislative Council. Her election was made possible with the assistance of the Liberal Party, which exerted its influence to avoid the election of another Labor MLC. Rygate rejoined the Labor Party in 1966 and served until the introduction of direct election to the Legislative Council in 1978, when she retired. She died at Canowindra in 1988.
