= Alexander Armstrong (Australian politician) =

Politician, grazier and businessman in New South Wales, Australia

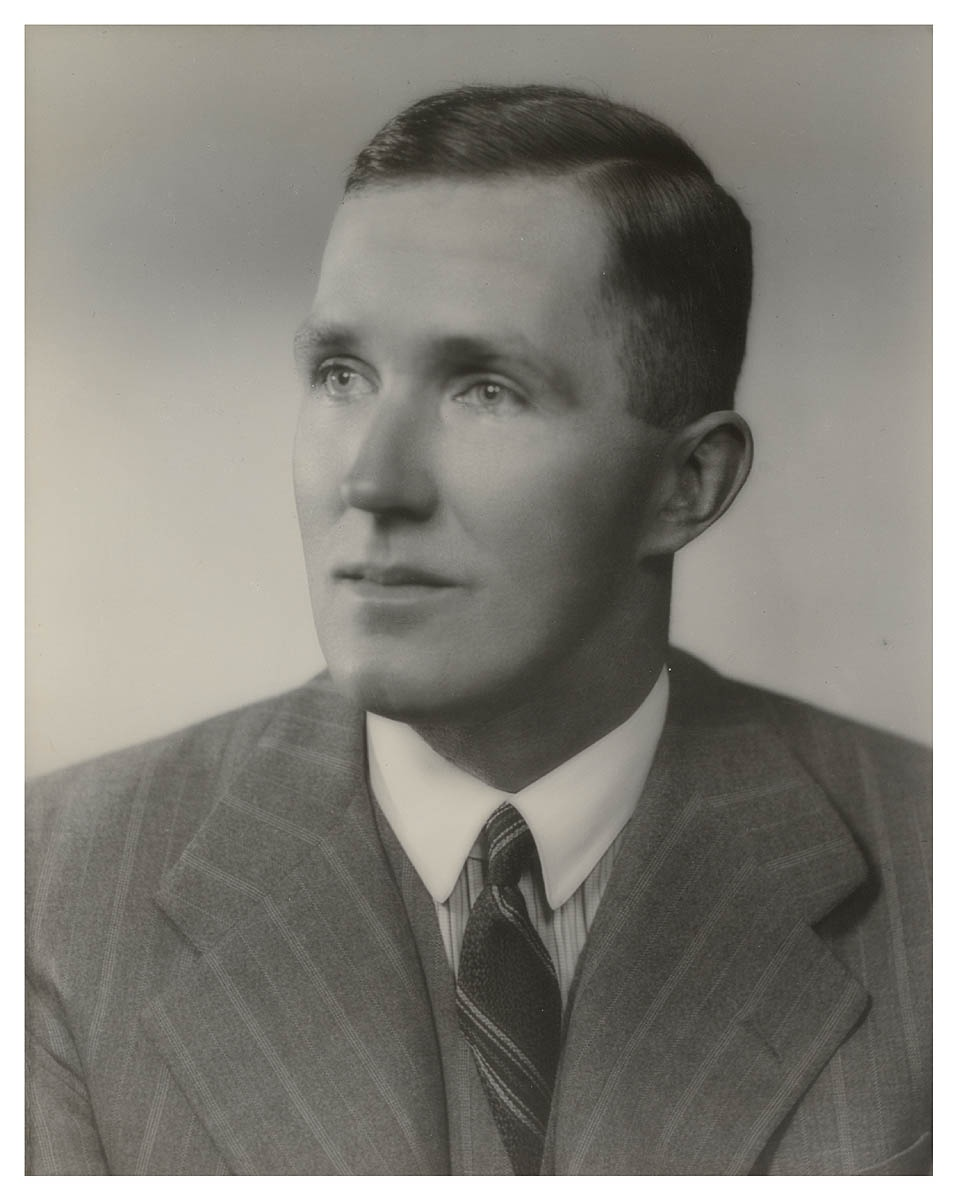
- Portrait of Alexander Ewan Armstrong, ca. 1942

Member of the New South Wales Legislative Council
- In office 23 April 1952 – 25 February 1969

Personal details
- Born: Alexander Ewan Armstrong; 15 June 1916 Sydney, New South Wales, Australia
- Died: 27 April 1985 (aged 68) Alice Springs, Northern Territory, Australia
- Party: Liberal Party
- Other political affiliations: Country Party
- Spouse(s): Marjorie Alma Goodhew; Margaret Rose Cleary
- Parent(s): George Armstrong; Florence Edith Ewan
- Education: Scots College
- Occupation: Grazier

Alexander Ewan Armstrong (15 June 1916 – 27 April 1985) was a politician, grazier and businessman in New South Wales, Australia.

== Biography ==
Armstrong was born in Sydney to doctor George Armstrong and Florence Edith Ewan. He attended Scots College and became a grazier, working first on the family's Albury property and then at Winderadeen and Collector. On 10 February 1945, he married Marjorie Alma Goodhew and they had two daughters. He later divorced, and remarried Margaret Rose Cleary in July 1963.

A member of the Liberal Party, he was elected to the New South Wales Legislative Council in 1952. In 1956, he defected to the Country Party. In 1968 the Supreme Court found that Armstrong had threatened to have a business associate killed, and on 25 February 1969 the Legislative Council passed a resolution that he was guilty of conduct unworthy of a member of the council and that he be expelled. Armstrong unsuccessfully challenged his expulsion in the Court of Appeal.

He died at Alice Springs in 1985.

== See also ==
- Barton v Armstrong
