= Independent Labor Group =

Former New South Welsh political party

The Independent Labor Group was a minor Australian political grouping in the New South Wales Legislative Council from 1959 to 1977. The group emerged when a number of Labor Party MLCs were expelled from the party for voting against the abolition of the Legislative Council, which was then party policy.

Eight Labor MLCs were expelled in 1959, and they were formally constituted as the Independent Labor Group on 22 August 1961, electing Thomas Gleeson as their leader. They held the balance of power throughout most of the early 1960s, increasing their numbers to ten in 1961, when the Coalition aided the election of Amelia Rygate. In the late 1960s, however, the group's power began to diminish. Amelia Rygate rejoined the Labor Party in 1966; Anne Press joined the Liberal Party in 1967. The last Independent Labor representative, Cyril Cahill, died in 1977.

== Parliamentarians ==
MLC	Term
Thomas Gleeson	1959–1975
Cyril Cahill	1959–1977
Donald Cochrane	1959–1964
Patrick Grace	1959–1964
Charles Hackett	1959–1964
John Kenny	1959–1970
Anne Press	1959–1967
Gerald Rygate	1959–1960
Harry Gardiner	1960–1974
Michael Quinn	1960–1965
Amelia Rygate	1961–1966
Norman Boland	1966–1970
Hubert O'Connell	1967–1971
