= William Murray (Australian politician) =

Australian politician

William Thomas Murray (9 April 1890 – 23 October 1980) was an Australian politician.

He was born at Lilyfield to power station engineer Michael Murray and Mary Ryan. He was educated by the Marist Brothers and at Fort Street High School, becoming a railway officer. A Labor Party member from 1922, he was involved in the Railway and Tramway Officers' Association, which became the Australasian Transport Officers' Association. On 7 October 1924 he married May Boyle, with whom he had three daughters. An executive member of the Transport Officers' Association, he was a Marrickville alderman from 1941 to 1959, serving as mayor in 1945, 1946 and 1954. From 1956 to 1969 he served on Sydney County Council, including as chairman from 1959 to 1960. From 1952 to 1976 he was a Labor member of the New South Wales Legislative Council. Murray died in Marrickville in 1980.

Civic offices
Preceded by Donald Cochrane	Mayor of Marrickville; 1944 – 1946	Succeeded by Robert Richard Allison
Preceded by Norm Ryan	Mayor of Marrickville; 1953 – 1954	Succeeded by Albert Edward Murdock
Government offices
Preceded by Ernest Charles O'Dea	Chairman of the Sydney County Council; 1959 – 1961	Succeeded by William Charles Doherty
