= Robert Erskine (politician) =

Australian politician

Robert Hamilton Erskine (25 June 1905 – 18 September 1982) was an Australian politician.

He was born at Merewether to tram driver Richard Hamilton Erskine and Anne Bland Craig. His family moved to Newtown in 1912, where he was educated. From 1917 he was a milkman's assistant and subsequently a commercial traveller's buggy boy, eventually becoming a textile worker. On 11 June 1932 he married Mary Ferry, with whom he had two daughters. He was active in the Australian Textile Workers' Union, serving on the management committee from 1928 and as secretary and treasurer from 1941 to 1962. From 1947 to 1962 he was federal president of the union, and from 1962 to 1972 federal secretary and treasurer. From 1949 to 1973 he was a Labor member of the New South Wales Legislative Council. Erskine died at Earlwood in 1982.
