= Frank Spicer =

Australian politician (1893–1977)

Frank William Spicer OBE (29 April 1893 – 1 January 1977) was an Australian politician.

He was born in Parkes to baker and miner William Page Spicer and Elizabeth McMurray. He attended school at Parkes and worked as a hairdresser and garage proprietor. From 1922 to 1962 he was an alderman at Parkes, serving as mayor from 1926 to 1928 and from 1931 to 1939. On 4 March 1919 he married Louie West, with whom he had four children. In 1925 he was elected to the New South Wales Legislative Council as a Labor member. He was an opponent of Jack Lang within the party and sat as Federal Labor from 1931 (as distinct from the Lang party). He did not rejoin the state Labor party after the split and sat as an independent until 1949, when he joined the Country Party. Spicer served in the council until 1973, and died at Parkes in 1977.

He started the Radio Station 1404 2PK OUR HISTORY | 14042pk
