= Edward Warren (politician) =

Australian politician

Sir Edward Warren KCMG, KBE

Member of the New South Wales Legislative Council
- In office 23 April 1955 – 5 November 1978

Personal details
- Born: 26 August 1897 Broken Hill, New South Wales
- Died: 8 September 1983 (aged 86) Clifton Gardens, New South Wales
- Party: Liberal Party
- Spouse: Doris Schultz (m. 1926)
- Occupation: Businessman
- Civilian awards: Knight Commander of the Order of St Michael and St George; Knight Commander of the Order of the British Empire; Grand Cordon of the Order of the Rising Sun (Japan)

Military service
- Allegiance: Australia
- Branch/service: Australian Imperial Force
- Years of service: 1915–1919
- Rank: Sergeant
- Battles/wars: First World War
- Military awards: Meritorious Service Medal

Sir Edward Emerton Warren, KCMG, KBE (26 August 1897 – 8 September 1983) was an Australian politician.

Warren was born in Broken Hill to mine manager John Warren. He was educated locally and in North Sydney, and was an office boy in a colliery firm from 1914. From 1915 to 1919 he served in the Australian Imperial Force, being awarded the Meritorious Service Medal. On his return he rejoined the colliery firm, and eventually rose to become general manager in 1945. In 1955 he was the foundation chairman of the Australian Coal Association, serving until 1972.

From 1955 to 1978 Warren was a Liberal member of the New South Wales Legislative Council. He was appointed a Companion of the Order of St Michael and St George in 1956, a Knight Commander of the Order of the British Empire in 1959, and a Knight Commander of the Order of St Michael and St George in 1969. Warren died at Clifton Gardens in 1983.
