= John Weir (politician) =

Australian politician

John Alexander Weir (11 October 1904 – 4 December 1995) was an Australian politician.

He was born in Sydney and was a timber worker from 1921. From 1922 he was a member of the Australian Timber Workers' Union; he later became state secretary in 1943 and president in 1950. From 1931 he was a Labor Party member, supporting Jack Lang over the federal party. He was a Labor member of the New South Wales Legislative Council from 1949 to 1973. Weir died at Camperdown in 1995.
