= Col Colborne =

Australian politician

Colin Colborne (3 October 1909 – 9 August 1987) was an Australian politician.

He was born in Brisbane to printer and politician William Parry Colborne and Kathleen Mary Davey. He was educated in Brisbane and became a machine compositor. He then moved to New South Wales and became an assistant federal secretary of the Printing Industry Employees' Union in 1938. He was federal secretary of the union from 1952 to 1974, and also editor of the Printing Trades Journal. On 19 June 1937, he married Ellen Hindmarsh, with whom he had three children. From 1949 to 1973, he served as a Labor member of the New South Wales Legislative Council. Colborne died in Carlton in 1987.
