= Harold Ahern =

Australian politician

The Honourable Harold Ahern

Member of the New South Wales Legislative Council
- In office 23 April 1949 – 22 April 1973

Personal details
- Born: Harold Daniel Ahern; 14 September 1903 Australia
- Died: 17 July 1987 (aged 83) Mosman, New South Wales, Australia
- Party: Liberal
- Spouse: Bertha Wilhelmina Prismall (m. 1938)
- Profession: Civil engineer

Harold Daniel Ahern (14 September 1903 – 17 July 1987) was an Australian politician.

He attended the Royal Melbourne Technical College and the University of Sydney, qualifying as an engineer. On 8 August 1938 he married Bertha Wilhelmina Prismall, with whom he had two sons. He worked for the Public Works Department as a rural development engineer and then for the British Houston Company before becoming an executive of the Electric Light and Power Supply Corporation. From 1949 to 1973 he was a Liberal member of the New South Wales Legislative Council. Ahern died at Mosman in 1987.
