= Anne Press =

Australian politician

Anne Elizabeth Press, née Speechley (25 August 1903 – 23 August 1992) was an Australian politician.

She was born at Dubbo to farmers Thomas and Charlotte Speechley. She was educated privately before training at Sydney Teachers College, thereafter teaching at Condobolin (1922–23), Tichborne (1923–24) and Forbes (1924–25). On 1 September 1924 she married Thomas F. Press, a farmer, with whom she had three children. She was on the council of the New South Wales Parents and Citizens Federation from 1950 to 1953 and vice-president from 1953 to 1960, and was director of the Condobolin Hospital Board from 1953 to 1978.

In 1959, Press was elected to the New South Wales Legislative Council as a member of the Labor Party. However, she opposed the Labor policy of abolishing the Legislative Council, and together with a number of other Labor MLCs was expelled from the party shortly after her election; these members formed the Independent Labor Group. Eventually the group began to fragment, and Press joined the Liberal Party in 1967. When the Council became directly elected in 1978, Press did not nominate and retired. She died at Condobolin in 1992.
