= Norman Thom =

Australian politician

James Norman Thom (8 October 1899 – 10 October 1987) was an Australian politician.

He was born in Warroo to police officer Frederick Alfred Thom and Sarah Burke. He was educated at convent schools and became an apprentice electrician. He enlisted in 1918, but was not called for service, and in 1917 he had joined the Labor Party. He became involved in the Electrical Trades Union, serving as New South Wales secretary from 1941 to 1948 and federal secretary from 1948 to 1964. He was also an executive member (1941–1964) and president (1956–64) of the Trades and Labor Council and an executive member of the Australian Council of Trade Unions (1946–1964). From 1950 to 1978, he was a Labor member of the New South Wales Legislative Council. Thom died in Newport in 1987.
