= William Coulter (politician) =

Irish-born Australian politician (1899–1984)

William Robert Coulter (1 December 1899 – 3 April 1984) was an Irish-born Australian politician.

He was born at Antrim and educated at Glasgow, arriving in New South Wales around 1918. He became an engineer, and in 1929 married Mary Joyce Buckley, with whom he had a son. In 1923 he had joined the Labor Party, and from 1941 to 1943 he was a delegate to the federal conference. He was on the party's central executive from 1941 to 1946 and was an organiser for the Industrial Groups from 1946 to 1952. In 1947 he was elected to the New South Wales Legislative Council. He was appointed Labor whip in 1970, a position he held until 1976. Coulter left the Council in 1978 and died at Coogee in 1984.
