= Thomas Gleeson (Australian politician) =

Australian politician

Thomas Patrick Gleeson (28 May 1895 – 25 November 1975) was an Australian politician.

He was born at Wollar to John Gleeson and Catherine Anne Lane. He was educated at Wyaldra, Yarraman and Grass Tree Vale, and held a number of jobs in rural New South Wales, including mail runner and taxi driver. From around 1925 he farmed at Tambar Springs, eventually focusing on wheat. On 17 March 1925 he married Bridget Kennedy, with whom he had seven children. From the 1940s he was a member of the Labor Party, and in 1946 he was elected to the New South Wales Legislative Council as a Labor member. In 1959 he was expelled from the party for voting against the abolition of the Legislative Council, and he was a driving force behind the establishment of the Independent Labor Group of like-minded MLCs, which he led from 1961 to 1975. Gleeson died at Umina in 1975.
