= Cyril Cahill =

Australian politician

Cyril Joseph Cahill (21 November 1900 – 18 April 1977) was an Australian politician.

He was born in Inverell to schoolteacher William John Cahill and Ada, née Radford. His brother, Jim Cahill, was also a politician. He attended De La Salle College in Armidale and the University of Sydney, where he studied pharmacy. On 17 June 1925 he married Grace Daley at Ballina; they had one daughter. From 1926 he ran a pharmacy in Tamworth which he expanded to a chain across northern New South Wales. He had been a member of the Labor Party since 1940, and in 1949 he was elected to the New South Wales Legislative Council. He was expelled from the ALP in 1959 for voting against the abolition of the Legislative Council, whereafter he was a member of the Independent Labor Group. He was the ILP's last remaining representative when he died at Tamworth in 1977.
