= Otway Falkiner =

Australian politician

Otway McLaurin Falkiner (19 April 1909 – 22 March 2000) was an Australian politician.

He was born in Melbourne to grazier Otway Rothwell Falkiner and Mary Elizabeth McLaurin; his uncles Franc and Norman Falkiner were also members of parliament. He attended Geelong Grammar School and became a grazier. On 11 October 1934 he married Agnes Cullen; they had four children but were divorced in 1977. He served in the New South Wales Legislative Council from 1946 to 1978, representing the Country Party. Falkiner died in Sydney in 2000.
