= Candidates of the 2027 New South Wales state election =

The 2027 New South Wales state election will be held on 13 March 2027 to elect all 93 seats of the Legislative Assembly, as well as 21 out of the 42 Legislative Council seats.

Nominations for candidates are scheduled to close at 12:00 pm AEST on 24 February 2027, and the NSW Electoral Commission is expected to declare the nominations the following day.

== Retiring members ==
The following members have announced that they will not contest the 2027 New South Wales state election:

=== Labor ===
- Hugh McDermott MP (Prospect) – announced 1 October 2026
- David Harris MP (Wyong) – announced 30 October 2026
- Sonia Hornery MP (Wallsend) – announced 3 November 2026

=== Liberal ===
- Mark Hodges MP (Castle Hill) – lost preselection 28 February 2026
- Mark Taylor MP (Winston Hills) – announced 8 July 2026
- James Griffin MP (Manly) – announced 2 September 2026
- Alister Henskens MP (Wahroonga) – announced 11 September 2026
- Ray Williams MP (Kellyville) – announced 20 October 2026
- Tanya Davies MP (Badgerys Creek) – announced 21 October 2026
- Mark Coure MP (Oatley) – announced 3 November 2026
- Jordan Lane (Ryde) – announced 6 November 2026
- Mark Speakman (Cronulla) – announced 19 November 2026

=== Greens ===
- Tamara Smith MP (Ballina) – announced 1 May 2026

== Legislative Assembly ==
Sitting members are shown in bold text. Successful candidates are highlighted in the relevant colour. Coalition candidates are denoted with (L) for Liberal Party and (N) for National Party.

Electorate	Held by	Labor candidate	Coalition candidate	Greens candidate	Family First candidate	Libertarian candidate	Other candidates
Albury	Liberal				Rebecca Scriven		Lucas Ellis (SAP)
Auburn	Labor			Hunter Thomson		Mike Luo	Jasmine Al-Rawi (NSW Soc)
Badgerys Creek	Liberal	Garion Thain					
Ballina	Greens	Janet Swain	Michelle Bailey (N)	Mandy Nolan	Gushiv D'Arcy		
Balmain	Greens	Philippa Scott		**Kobi Shetty**			Isaac Nellist (SAll)
Bankstown	Labor						
Barwon	Independent		Lucie Wightman (N)			Sally Edwards	
Bathurst	National				Anthony Craig	Gareth Houghton	Danial Beech (SFF)
Bega	Labor						
Blacktown	Labor			Dalys Jacobsen			Rishi Kapoor (Ind)
Blue Mountains	Labor		Sophie Bruce (L)	Luciana Carusi			
Cabramatta	Labor					Victor Tey	
Camden	Labor		Mick Willing (L)		Jeremy Antcliffe		
Campbelltown	Labor			Jayden Rivera	Lisa Kiss		
Canterbury	Labor			Conroy Blood		Vanessa Hadchiti	Dylan Foster (SAP)
Castle Hill	Liberal		Peter Gangemi (L)	Aidan Tobin			
Cessnock	Labor			Ethan Floyd		James Szczepanski	Mike Newman (ONP)
Charlestown	Labor				Kim Farnham		
Clarence	National						
Coffs Harbour	National	Sean David Van Der Heide			Peter Ham		
Coogee	Labor		Carolyn Martin (L)				Angela Dunnett (SAP)
Cootamundra	National						
Cronulla	Liberal						
Davidson	Liberal						
Drummoyne	Liberal	Julia Little					
Dubbo	National						
East Hills	Labor		Wendy Lindsay (L)		Gemma Macaulay		
Epping	Liberal	Tanya Raffoul				Rob Cribb	
Fairfield	Labor		Dennis Suro				
Gosford	Labor		Dee Bocking	Rhiannon Schembri			Damian Phaserian-Dusk (Ind)
Goulburn	Liberal					Gregory Harris	Benjamin Gifford (Ind)
Granville	Labor					Steve Christou	Alma Torlakovic (NSW Soc); Sal El-Kheir
Hawkesbury	Liberal	Adam Hall					
Heathcote	Labor			Nick McLaren			
Heffron	Labor						Rachel Evans (SAll)
Holsworthy	Liberal	Zeli Munjiza			Peter Ristevski		
Hornsby	Liberal						
Keira	Labor			Kit Docker			Kylie Flament (Ind)
Kellyville	Liberal			Ben Speechly			
Kiama	Labor		Serena Copley (L)				
Kogarah	Labor			Yomna Touni			Wasim El-Haj (Ind)
Lake Macquarie	Independent						
Lane Cove	Liberal				Kara-Lee Richards	Graham Cribb	
Leppington	Labor					Sonia Qutami	Danica Sajn (SAP)
Lismore	Labor			Luke Robinson		Brenton Williams	
Liverpool	Labor			Avery Howard		Adam Osman	
Londonderry	Labor						Gerals McCool (Ind)
Macquarie Fields	Labor					Michael Romeo	Muhamad Khalil (Ind)
Maitland	Labor		Michael Cooper (L)	Paul Johns			
Manly	Liberal		Adelaide Cuneo	Kristyn Glanville		Nathan Thomson	Elouise Massa (Ind)
Maroubra	Labor		Kate Beaumont (L)				
Miranda	Liberal	Simon Earle					Sarah Coulon (Dem)
Monaro	Labor		Mareeta Grundy (N)				Luke Downes (Ind); James Holgate (SAP)
Mount Druitt	Labor				Philip Finau		
Murray	Independent						
Myall Lakes	National						
Newcastle	Labor			Lucinda Miller			Steve O'Brien (SAll)
Newtown	Greens			**Jenny Leong**		Tan Hibbert	Shovan Bhattarai (NSW Soc)
North Shore	Liberal						Michael Randall (Ind)
Northern Tablelands	National						
Oatley	Liberal	Elaina Anzellotti		Irfan Hai	Isaac Yakoubi		
Orange	Independent						
Oxley	National				Neil Ingleson		David Booth (Ind)
Parramatta	Labor		Sreeni Pillamarri (L)	Liz Tilly	Andrew McLachlan		
Penrith	Labor				Antony Emmanuel	Vanessa Pollak	
Pittwater	Independent		Michael Gencher (L)			Joshua Beer	**Jacqui Scruby** (Ind)
Port Macquarie	Liberal						
Port Stephens	Labor					David Calder	
Prospect	Labor	Liz Scully	Kalvin Biag (L)	Sujan Selven	Pieter Swan		
Riverstone	Labor		Mohit Kumar (L)				Phillip Lipson (Ind)
Rockdale	Labor			Dushy de Silva			
Ryde	Liberal	Lyndal Howison			Andrew Amos	Meray Hajjar	
Shellharbour	Labor						
South Coast	Labor		Paul Ell (L)				
Strathfield	Labor						
Summer Hill	Labor			Izabella Antoniou		Dave Smith	Emma Norton (NSW Soc)
Swansea	Labor				Matthew Reeves		
Sydney	Independent			Nick Ward			**Alex Greenwich** (Ind) Saman Iravani (Ind); Christopher Thomas (SAP)
Tamworth	National						Vanessa Phelps (Ind) Krystle Rowley (Ind)
Terrigal	Liberal	Sam Boughton		Rose Noble			
The Entrance	Labor		Michael Hall (L)	Simon Cooper			Carmen Jackson (Ind) Matthew Jeffrey (Ind)
Tweed	National			Sharon Friel			
Upper Hunter	National						
Vaucluse	Liberal				Sri Affandi		Evan Hughes (Ind)
Wagga Wagga	Independent						
Wahroonga	Liberal		John Foong (L)				
Wakehurst	Independent		Philip Longley (L)			Sean Mcleod	
Wallsend	Labor	Emily Suvaal		Alex Ford		Geoffery Robertson	Kate Doherty (NSW Soc)
Willoughby	Liberal						Michael Want (SAP)
Winston Hills	Liberal	Pat Gooley	Georgina Valjak (L)	Palaniappan Subramanian			Anthony Chadszinow (SAP)
Wollondilly	Independent						
Wollongong	Labor			Malika Reese	Alana Bartlett		Ryan Chapman (NSW Soc)
Wyong	Labor	Tracey Ellen	Ken Kozak (L)		Jacob Harding-Davis		Xander McMillan (Ind)

== Legislative Council ==
Sitting members are shown in bold text.

Half of the Legislative Council is not up for re-election. This includes eight Labor members (Courtney Houssos, Rose Jackson, Cameron Murphy, Emily Suvaal, John Graham, Bob Nanva, Stephen Lawrence, and Sarah Kaine), five Liberal members (Natasha Maclaren-Jones, Chris Rath, Susan Carter, Jacqui Munro, and Rachel Merton), two National members (Scott Barrett and Ben Franklin), two Greens members (Cate Faehrmann and Amanda Cohn), one Shooters and Fishers member (Robert Borsak), one Libertarian member (John Ruddick), one Legalise Cannabis member (Jeremy Buckingham), and independent member Mark Latham, who was elected as a One Nation member.

The Labor party is defending seven seats. The Liberal party is defending four seats. The National party is defending three seats. The Greens are defending two seats. The Shooters and Fishers, and the Animal Justice Party are each defending one seat. Independent members Tania Mihailuk and Rod Roberts, who were elected or appointed as One Nation members, have their terms expire in 2027.

Tickets that elected at least one MLC are highlighted in the relevant colour. Successful candidates are identified with an asterisk (*).

Labor candidates	Coalition candidates	Greens candidates	Family First candidates	Libertarian candidates
Mark Morey	**Natalie Ward**	**Abigail Boyd**; **Sue Higginson**; Lynda-June Coe	Lyle Shelton	Gemma Noiosi
Socialist Alliance candidates	One Nation candidates	Josh for NSW candidates	Australian Christians candidates	Other candidates
Peter Boyle; Karyn Brown; Olivia Carney; Andrew Chuter; Paula Corvalan; Rohan Fraser; Pip Hinman; Gabrielle McCutcheon; Jim McIlroy; Ben Radford; Philippa Ryan; Arlo Valmai; James Wyner; Coral Wynter	Stuart Bonds; Jeff Bacon; Katherine Deves; Arnon Wither; Manti Steele; Daniel Hill	Joshua Kirsh	Asher Wolfson	Warren Grzic; Cameron Macpherson

== See also ==
- Opinion polling for the 2027 New South Wales state election
