= 2027 New South Wales state election =

- 13 March 2027

All 93 seats in the Legislative Assembly 47 seats needed for a majority 21 of 42 seats in the Legislative Council
- Opinion polls
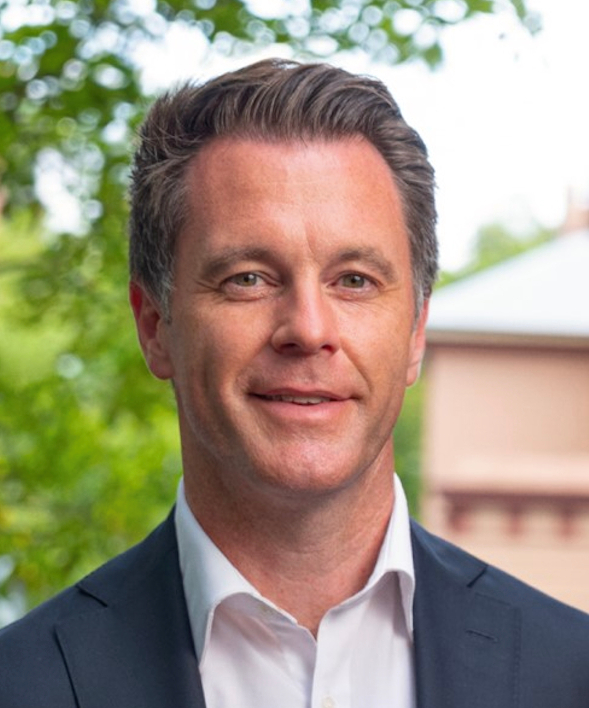

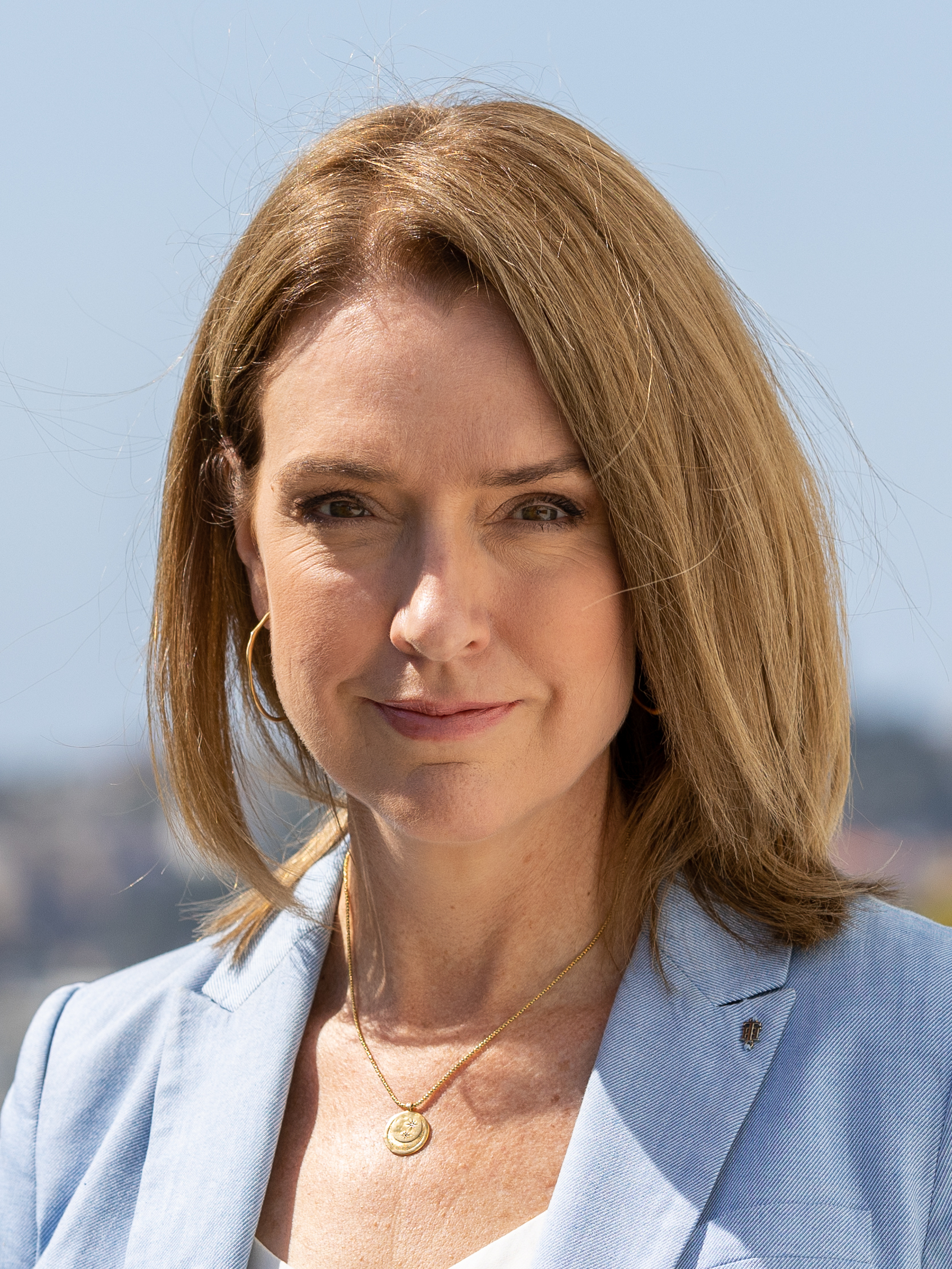

Leader	Chris Minns	Kellie Sloane	No leader
Party	Labor	Liberal–National Coalition	Greens
Leader since	4 June 2021	21 November 2025	N/A
Leader's seat	Kogarah	Vaucluse	N/A
Last election	45 seats	36 seats	3 seats
Current seats	46	35	3
Seats needed	▲1	▲12	▲44
Incumbent Premier
Chris Minns
Labor

A general election is scheduled to be held on 13 March 2027 to elect members of the 59th Parliament of New South Wales. All 93 seats in the Legislative Assembly will be up for election, along with 21 of the 42 seats in the Legislative Council. The election will be conducted by the NSW Electoral Commission (NSWEC).

The incumbent Labor minority government, led by Premier Chris Minns, will seek to win a second four-year term in office. They will be challenged by the Liberal–National Coalition, led by Opposition Leader Kellie Sloane. One Nation, the Greens, the Shooters, Fishers and Farmers Party, other minor parties and several independents will also contest the election.

New South Wales has compulsory voting, with optional preferential, instant runoff voting in single-member seats for the lower house (Legislative Assembly), and single transferable voting with an optional system of preferences that voters can mark in the proportionally represented upper house (Legislative Council).

== Background ==
At the previous state election held in 2023, the Labor Party (ALP), led by Chris Minns, won the election after spending 12 years in opposition. The election saw Labor win 45 seats as opposed to the Coalition's 36 seats on election day, allowing Labor to form a minority government. The Greens retained their three seats, while the Shooters, Fishers and Farmers lost all three of their seats as a result of their MPs resigning from the party to become independents in the 2019–2023 parliament, as well as two independents who gained seats.

In the Legislative Council (the upper house), 21 of the 42 seats were up for election. Both the Coalition and Labor won 15 seats each, however after the election of Ben Franklin as President of the Legislative Council, the Coalition's effective total vote on the floor on the council was reduced to 14. The Greens won four seats in the Legislative Council. One Nation won three seats, which is its largest representation in New South Wales and currently its largest in any Australian state or territory parliament. Meanwhile, the Shooters, Fishers and Farmers Party retained its two seats, the Animal Justice Party lost one of its two seats and two parties (the Legalise Cannabis Party and the Libertarian Party, which was registered as the Liberal Democrats in 2023) won their first ever seats in the New South Wales Parliament.

During the 2023–2027 term of parliament, the government announced plans to rezone and activate Woollahra station, which is part of the T4 eastern suburbs line but was never completed due to local opposition in an effort to solve housing supply issues and announced major housing policies (such as transit-oriented development, the creation of a three-person panel named the Housing Delivery Authority to expedite approvals and banned no-fault evictions for renters as well as capping rent increases to once per year), and increased teachers' wages to attract more people to the profession. They have also acted upon a pledge at the previous election to abolish the land tax introduced by former premier Dominic Perrottet. The government have also set in train processes to create new national parks based upon previous election pledges, those being in Georges River for Koalas and one in the North Coast to create a "Great Koala National Park".

The Coalition opposition have proposed building new metro lines.

Since the 2023 state election, there have been six by-elections: in Northern Tablelands, Pittwater, Epping, Hornsby, Port Macquarie and Kiama. As a result of these by-elections, Labor's share of seats increased by one to 46, one short of a majority and the Liberal seat count was reduced by one to 35.

In November 2025, Speakman resigned as leader of the Liberal party and was replaced by shadow health minister Kellie Sloane.

== Date ==
The parliament has fixed four-year terms with the election held on the fourth Saturday in March, though the Governor may dissolve the house sooner on the advice of the Premier.

Additionally, section 24B, paragraph four of the Constitution Act 1902 states that "The Legislative Assembly may be dissolved within 2 months before the Assembly is due to expire if the general election would otherwise be required to be held during the same period as a Commonwealth election, during a holiday period or at any other inconvenient time." Since 27 March 2027 is Holy Saturday, the government has announced that an election will be held on 13 March. Two months before this date is 27 January 2027; however, since all Australian elections must by law take place on a Saturday, the earliest possible date for the 2027 New South Wales state election (other than by early dissolution) is Saturday 30 January 2027.

== Pre-election pendulum ==
Extended content

Labor seats (45)
Seat	Member	Party	Margin
Marginal
Penrith	Karen McKeown	ALP	1.6%
East Hills	Kylie Wilkinson	ALP	1.8%
Monaro	Steve Whan	ALP	2.4% v NAT
Camden	Sally Quinnell	ALP	2.9%
South Coast	Liza Butler	ALP	3.7%
Riverstone	Warren Kirby	ALP	3.7%
Fairly safe
The Entrance	David Mehan	ALP	7.8%
Liverpool	Charishma Kaliyanda	ALP	8.4%
Parramatta	Donna Davis	ALP	8.5%
Leppington	Nathan Hagarty	ALP	8.7%
Prospect	Hugh McDermott	ALP	8.8%
Heathcote	Maryanne Stuart	ALP	9.9%
Safe
Bega	Michael Holland	ALP	10.4%
Cabramatta	Tri Vo	ALP	11.8%
Coogee	Marjorie O'Neill	ALP	12.2%
Strathfield	Jason Yat-Sen Li	ALP	13.1%
Londonderry	Prue Car	ALP	13.6%
Lismore	Janelle Saffin	ALP	15.0% v NAT
Rockdale	Steve Kamper	ALP	15.4%
Swansea	Yasmin Catley	ALP	15.4%
Gosford	Liesl Tesch	ALP	15.4%
Shellharbour	Anna Watson	ALP	17.1% v IND
Summer Hill	Jo Haylen	ALP	16.8% v GRN
Very safe
Kogarah	Chris Minns	ALP	18.3%
Maroubra	Michael Daley	ALP	18.6%
Maitland	Jenny Aitchison	ALP	18.6%
Port Stephens	Kate Washington	ALP	19.0%
Wyong	David Harris	ALP	19.2%
Macquarie Fields	Anoulack Chanthivong	ALP	19.9%
Blacktown	Stephen Bali	ALP	20.1%
Bankstown	Jihad Dib	ALP	20.3%
Charlestown	Jodie Harrison	ALP	21.1%
Fairfield	David Saliba	ALP	21.1%
Granville	Julia Finn	ALP	21.5%
Blue Mountains	Trish Doyle	ALP	21.9%
Mount Druitt	Edmond Atalla	ALP	22.3%
Newcastle	Tim Crakanthorp	ALP	22.6%
Heffron	Ron Hoenig	ALP	23.2%
Campbelltown	Greg Warren	ALP	23.3%
Cessnock	Clayton Barr	ALP	23.4% v ONP
Auburn	Lynda Voltz	ALP	24%
Keira	Ryan Park	ALP	24.3%
Wollongong	Paul Scully	ALP	24.3%
Canterbury	Sophie Cotsis	ALP	25.7%
Wallsend	Sonia Hornery	ALP	31.8%

Liberal/National seats (36)
Seat	Member	Party	Margin
Marginal
Ryde	Jordan Lane	LIB	0.1% (Note: Jordan Lane won the seat by just 54 votes in the two-party-preferred contest against Labor candidate Lyndal Howison. Labor saw an 8.9% swing towards them on two-party-preferences, which was the exact margin that the Liberals won Ryde with in 2019 with Victor Dominello.)
Holsworthy	Tina Ayyad	LIB	0.4%
Pittwater	Jacqui Scruby	IND	0.7% LIB v IND (Note: This number reflects the result at the 2023 New South Wales state election rather than the 2024 Pittwater state by-election, which Labor did not contest, for consistency.)
Oatley	Mark Coure	LIB	0.8%
Terrigal	Adam Crouch	LIB	1.2%
Goulburn	Wendy Tuckerman	LIB	1.3%
Drummoyne	Stephanie Di Pasqua	LIB	1.3%
Winston Hills	Mark Taylor	LIB	1.8%
Miranda	Eleni Petinos	LIB	2.3%
Willoughby	Tim James	LIB	2.6% v IND
Tweed	Geoff Provest	NAT	3.6%
Upper Hunter	Dave Layzell	NAT	3.8%
Manly	James Griffin	LIB	4.8% v IND
Epping	Monica Tudehope	LIB	4.8% (Note: This number reflects the result at the 2023 New South Wales state election rather than the 2024 Epping state by-election, which Labor did not contest, for consistency.)
Lane Cove	Anthony Roberts	LIB	5.5%
North Shore	Felicity Wilson	LIB	5.6% v IND
Fairly safe
Hornsby	James Wallace	LIB	8.0% (Note: This number reflects the result at the 2023 New South Wales state election rather than the 2024 Hornsby state by-election, for consistency.)
Hawkesbury	Robyn Preston	LIB	9.9%
Safe
Wahroonga	Alister Henskens	LIB	10.5%
Badgerys Creek	Tanya Davies	LIB	10.5%
Castle Hill	Mark Hodges	LIB	10.9%
Kellyville	Ray Williams	LIB	10.9%
Oxley	Michael Kemp	NAT	12.8%
Vaucluse	Kellie Sloane	LIB	12.8% v IND
Coffs Harbour	Gurmesh Singh	NAT	13.2%
Davidson	Matt Cross	LIB	14.0%
Cronulla	Mark Speakman	LIB	14.0%
Clarence	Richie Williamson	NAT	14.5%
Tamworth	Kevin Anderson	NAT	15.8% v IND
Myall Lakes	Tanya Thompson	NAT	15.9%
Albury	Justin Clancy	LIB	16.3%
Port Macquarie	Robert Dwyer	LIB	16.7% (Note: The margin shown is the Liberal vs Labor margin at the 2023 election. At this election, two Coalition candidates contested the seat of Port Macquarie, both of which made the two-party-preferred contest. The Liberal vs National margin is 10.8%. Both parties also contested the 2025 Port Macquarie state by-election and Labor did not. It is very rare for the Coalition to run two candidates in New South Wales and it is thus unlikely that this phenomenon will reoccur in 2027.)
Very safe
Dubbo	Dugald Saunders	NAT	18.7%
Bathurst	Paul Toole	NAT	23.6%
Cootamundra	Steph Cooke	NAT	32.3%
Northern Tablelands	Brendan Moylan	NAT	33.8% (Note: This number reflects the result at the 2023 New South Wales state election rather than the 2024 Northern Tablelands state by-election, which Labor did not contest, for consistency.)

Crossbench seats (12)
Seat	Member	Party	Margin
Marginal
Wollondilly	Judy Hannan	IND	1.8% v LIB
Kiama	Katelin McInerney	ALP	1.8% v ALP (Note: This number reflects the result at the 2023 New South Wales state election rather than the 2025 Kiama state by-election for consistency.)
Balmain	Kobi Shetty	GRN	1.8% v ALP
Wakehurst	Michael Regan	IND	4.4% v LIB
Fairly safe
Ballina	Tamara Smith	GRN	7.7% v NAT
Safe
Newtown	Jenny Leong	GRN	12.1% v ALP
Sydney	Alex Greenwich	IND	15.8% v ALP
Murray	Helen Dalton	IND	16.0% v NAT
Barwon	Roy Butler	IND	16% v NAT
Very safe
Orange	Philip Donato	IND	22.0% v NAT
Wagga Wagga	Joe McGirr	IND	22.2% v NAT
Lake Macquarie	Greg Piper	IND	24.3% v ALP

== Registered parties ==
Twenty parties are registered with the NSW Electoral Commission (NSWEC). Bold text indicates parliamentary parties.

- **Animal Justice**
- Christians
- Citizens Party
- Family First
- **Greens**
- HEART Party
- Josh for NSW
- **Labor**
- **Legalise Cannabis**
- **Liberals**
- **Libertarians** (formerly Liberal Democrats)
- **Nationals**
- **One Nation**
- Public Education Party
- The Rural Party
- **Shooters, Fishers and Farmers Party**
- Small Business
- Socialist Alliance
- Sustainable Australia
- New South Wales Soc

== Candidates ==
Sitting members are shown in bold text. Successful candidates are highlighted in the relevant colour. Coalition candidates are denoted with (L) for Liberal Party and (N) for National Party.

Electorate	Held by	Labor candidate	Coalition candidate	Greens candidate	Family First candidate	Libertarian candidate	Other candidates
Albury	Liberal				Rebecca Scriven		Lucas Ellis (SAP)
Auburn	Labor			Hunter Thomson		Mike Luo	Jasmine Al-Rawi (NSW Soc)
Badgerys Creek	Liberal	Garion Thain					
Ballina	Greens	Janet Swain	Michelle Bailey (N)	Mandy Nolan	Gushiv D'Arcy		
Balmain	Greens	Philippa Scott		Kobi Shetty			Isaac Nellist (SAll)
Bankstown	Labor						
Barwon	Independent		Lucie Wightman (N)			Sally Edwards	
Bathurst	National				Anthony Craig	Gareth Houghton	Danial Beech (SFF)
Bega	Labor						
Blacktown	Labor			Dalys Jacobsen			Rishi Kapoor (Ind)
Blue Mountains	Labor		Sophie Bruce (L)	Luciana Carusi			
Cabramatta	Labor					Victor Tey	
Camden	Labor		Mick Willing (L)		Jeremy Antcliffe		
Campbelltown	Labor			Jayden Rivera	Lisa Kiss		
Canterbury	Labor			Conroy Blood		Vanessa Hadchiti	Dylan Foster (SAP)
Castle Hill	Liberal		Peter Gangemi (L)	Aidan Tobin			
Cessnock	Labor			Ethan Floyd		James Szczepanski	Mike Newman (ONP)
Charlestown	Labor				Kim Farnham		
Clarence	National						
Coffs Harbour	National	Sean David Van Der Heide			Peter Ham		
Coogee	Labor		Carolyn Martin (L)				Angela Dunnett (SAP)
Cootamundra	National						
Cronulla	Liberal						
Davidson	Liberal						
Drummoyne	Liberal	Julia Little					
Dubbo	National						
East Hills	Labor		Wendy Lindsay (L)		Gemma Macaulay		
Epping	Liberal					Rob Cribb	
Fairfield	Labor		Dennis Suro				
Gosford	Labor		Dee Bocking	Rhiannon Schembri			Damian Phaserian-Dusk (Ind)
Goulburn	Liberal					Gregory Harris	Benjamin Gifford (Ind)
Granville	Labor					Steve Christou	Alma Torlakovic (NSW Soc); Sal El-Kheir
Hawkesbury	Liberal	Adam Hall					
Heathcote	Labor			Nick McLaren			
Heffron	Labor						Rachel Evans (SAll)
Holsworthy	Liberal	Zeli Munjiza			Peter Ristevski		
Hornsby	Liberal						
Keira	Labor			Kit Docker			Kylie Flament (Ind)
Kellyville	Liberal			Ben Speechly			
Kiama	Labor		Serena Copley (L)				
Kogarah	Labor			Yomna Touni			Wasim El-Haj (Ind)
Lake Macquarie	Independent						
Lane Cove	Liberal				Kara-Lee Richards	Graham Cribb	
Leppington	Labor					Sonia Qutami	Danica Sajn (SAP)
Lismore	Labor			Luke Robinson		Brenton Williams	
Liverpool	Labor			Avery Howard		Adam Osman	
Londonderry	Labor						Gerals McCool (Ind)
Macquarie Fields	Labor					Michael Romeo	Muhamad Khalil (Ind)
Maitland	Labor		Michael Cooper (L)	Paul Johns			
Manly	Liberal		Adelaide Cuneo	Kristyn Glanville		Nathan Thomson	Elouise Massa (Ind)
Maroubra	Labor		Kate Beaumont (L)				
Miranda	Liberal	Simon Earle					Sarah Coulon (Dem)
Monaro	Labor		Mareeta Grundy (N)				Luke Downes (Ind); James Holgate (SAP)
Mount Druitt	Labor				Philip Finau		
Murray	Independent						
Myall Lakes	National						
Newcastle	Labor			Lucinda Miller			Steve O'Brien (SAll)
Newtown	Greens			Jenny Leong		Tan Hibbert	Shovan Bhattarai (NSW Soc)
North Shore	Liberal						Michael Randall (Ind)
Northern Tablelands	National						
Oatley	Liberal	Elaina Anzellotti		Irfan Hai	Isaac Yakoubi		
Orange	Independent						
Oxley	National				Neil Ingleson		David Booth (Ind)
Parramatta	Labor		Sreeni Pillamarri (L)	Liz Tilly	Andrew McLachlan		
Penrith	Labor				Antony Emmanuel	Vanessa Pollak	
Pittwater	Independent		Michael Gencher (L)			Joshua Beer	Jacqui Scruby (Ind)
Port Macquarie	Liberal						
Port Stephens	Labor					David Calder	
Prospect	Labor	Liz Scully	Kalvin Biag (L)	Sujan Selven	Pieter Swan		
Riverstone	Labor		Mohit Kumar (L)				Phillip Lipson (Ind)
Rockdale	Labor			Dushy de Silva			
Ryde	Liberal	Lyndal Howison			Andrew Amos	Meray Hajjar	
Shellharbour	Labor						
South Coast	Labor		Paul Ell (L)				
Strathfield	Labor						
Summer Hill	Labor			Izabella Antoniou		Dave Smith	Emma Norton (NSW Soc)
Swansea	Labor				Matthew Reeves		
Sydney	Independent			Nick Ward			Alex Greenwich (Ind) Saman Iravani (Ind); Christopher Thomas (SAP)
Tamworth	National						Vanessa Phelps (Ind) Krystle Rowley (Ind)
Terrigal	Liberal	Sam Boughton		Rose Noble			
The Entrance	Labor		Michael Hall (L)	Simon Cooper			Carmen Jackson (Ind) Matthew Jeffrey (Ind)
Tweed	National			Sharon Friel			
Upper Hunter	National						
Vaucluse	Liberal				Sri Affandi		Evan Hughes (Ind)
Wagga Wagga	Independent						
Wahroonga	Liberal		John Foong (L)				
Wakehurst	Independent		Philip Longley (L)			Sean Mcleod	
Wallsend	Labor	Emily Suvaal		Alex Ford		Geoffery Robertson	Kate Doherty (NSW Soc)
Willoughby	Liberal						Michael Want (SAP)
Winston Hills	Liberal	Pat Gooley	Georgina Valjak (L)	Palaniappan Subramanian			Anthony Chadszinow (SAP)
Wollondilly	Independent						
Wollongong	Labor			Malika Reese	Alana Bartlett		Ryan Chapman (NSW Soc)
Wyong	Labor	Tracey Ellen	Ken Kozak (L)		Jacob Harding-Davis		Xander McMillan (Ind)

Sitting members are shown in bold text.

Half of the Legislative Council is not up for re-election. This includes eight Labor members (Courtney Houssos, Rose Jackson, Cameron Murphy, Emily Suvaal, John Graham, Bob Nanva, Stephen Lawrence, and Sarah Kaine), five Liberal members (Natasha Maclaren-Jones, Chris Rath, Susan Carter, Jacqui Munro, and Rachel Merton), two National members (Scott Barrett and Ben Franklin), two Greens members (Cate Faehrmann and Amanda Cohn), one Shooters and Fishers member (Robert Borsak), one Libertarian member (John Ruddick), one Legalise Cannabis member (Jeremy Buckingham), and independent member Mark Latham, who was elected as a One Nation member.

The Labor party is defending seven seats. The Liberal party is defending four seats. The National party is defending three seats. The Greens are defending two seats. The Shooters and Fishers, and the Animal Justice Party are each defending one seat. Independent members Tania Mihailuk and Rod Roberts, who were elected or appointed as One Nation members, have their terms expire in 2027.

Tickets that elected at least one MLC are highlighted in the relevant colour. Successful candidates are identified with an asterisk (*).

Labor candidates	Coalition candidates	Greens candidates	Family First candidates	Libertarian candidates
Mark Morey	Natalie Ward	Abigail Boyd; Sue Higginson	Lyle Shelton	Gemma Noiosi
Socialist Alliance candidates	One Nation candidates	Josh for NSW candidates	Australian Christians candidates	Other candidates
Peter Boyle; Karyn Brown; Olivia Carney; Andrew Chuter; Paula Corvalan; Rohan Fraser; Pip Hinman; Gabrielle McCutcheon; Jim McIlroy; Ben Radford; Philippa Ryan; Arlo Valmai; James Wyner; Coral Wynter	Stuart Bonds; Jeff Bacon; Katherine Deves; Arnon Wither; Manti Steele; Daniel Hill	Joshua Kirsh	Asher Wolfson	Warren Grzic; Cameron Macpherson

== Retiring members ==
The following members have announced that they will not contest the 2027 New South Wales state election:

=== Labor ===
- Hugh McDermott MP (Prospect) – announced 1 October 2026
- David Harris MP (Wyong) – announced 30 October 2026
- Sonia Hornery MP (Wallsend) – announced 3 November 2026

=== Liberal ===
- James Griffin MP (Manly) – announced 2 September 2026
- Alister Henskens MP (Wahroonga) – announced 11 September 2026
- Mark Taylor MP (Winston Hills) – announced 8 July 2026
- Ray Williams MP (Kellyville) — announced 20 October 2026
- Tanya Davies MP (Badgerys Creek) — announced 21 October 2026
- Mark Coure MP (Oatley) – announced 3 November 2026
- Jordan Lane (Ryde) — announced 6 November 2026

=== Greens ===
- Tamara Smith MP (Ballina) – announced 1 May 2026

== Opinion polling ==
=== Primary vote ===
Primary vote opinion polls with LOESS smoothening (as of 12 July 2026)

=== Two-party preferred ===
Two-party preferred opinion polls with LOESS smoothening (as of 12 July 2026)

== See also ==
- Members of the New South Wales Legislative Council, 2023–2027
