= Members of the New South Wales Legislative Council, 2023–2027 =

Members of the New South Wales Legislative Council, 2023–2027

Members of the New South Wales Legislative Council who served in the 58th Parliament were elected at the 2019 and 2023 elections. As members serve eight-year terms, half of the Council was elected in 2019 and did not face re-election in 2023, and the members elected in 2023 will not face re-election until 2031. The President was Matthew Mason-Cox until May 2023 and Ben Franklin from May 2023.

Name	Party	End term	Years in office
Mark Banasiak	Shooters, Fishers, Farmers	2027	2019–present
Robert Borsak	Shooters, Fishers, Farmers	2031	2010–present
Abigail Boyd	Greens	2027	2019–present
Jeremy Buckingham	Legalise Cannabis	2031	2011–2019, 2023–present
Mark Buttigieg	Labor	2027	2019–present
Susan Carter	Liberal	2031	2023–present
Amanda Cohn	Greens	2031	2023–present
Anthony D'Adam	Labor	2027	2019–present
Greg Donnelly	Labor	2027	2005–2026
Scott Farlow	Liberal	2027	2015–2023, 2023–present
Cate Faehrmann	Greens	2031	2010–2013, 2018–present
Wes Fang	National	2027	2017–present
Sam Farraway	National	2027	2019–2024
Ben Franklin	National	2031	2015–2019, 2019–present
John Graham	Labor	2031	2016–present
Sue Higginson	Greens	2027	2022–present
Courtney Houssos	Labor	2031	2015–present
Emma Hurst	Animal Justice	2027	2019–present
Rose Jackson	Labor	2031	2019–present
Sarah Kaine	Labor	2031	2023–present
Mark Latham	One Nation / Independent	2031	2019–2023, 2023–present
Stephen Lawrence	Labor	2031	2023–present
Aileen MacDonald	Liberal	2027	2022–present
Natasha Maclaren-Jones	Liberal	2031	2011–2023, 2023–present
Taylor Martin	Liberal / Independent	2027	2017–present
Rachel Merton	Liberal	2031	2023–present
Tania Mihailuk	One Nation / Independent	2027	2023–present
Sarah Mitchell	National	2027	2011–present
Daniel Mookhey	Labor	2027	2015–present
Tara Moriarty	Labor	2027	2019–present
Jacqui Munro	Liberal	2031	2023–present
Cameron Murphy	Labor	2031	2023–present
Bob Nanva	Labor	2031	2023–present
Peter Primrose	Labor	2027	1996–present
Chris Rath	Liberal	2031	2022–present
Rod Roberts	One Nation / Independent	2027	2019–present
John Ruddick	Libertarian	2031	2023–present
Penny Sharpe	Labor	2027	2005–2015, 2015–present
Emily Suvaal	Labor	2031	2023–present
Bronnie Taylor	National	2031	2015–2024
Damien Tudehope	Liberal	2027	2019–present
Natalie Ward	Liberal	2027	2017–present
Scott Barrett	National	2027	2022–2023, 2024–present
Nichole Overall	National	2027	2025–present
