= Results of the 2023 New South Wales Legislative Council election =

2023 New South Wales state election (Legislative Council)
- 25 March 2023

21 of the 42 seats on the Legislative Council 21 seats needed for a majority
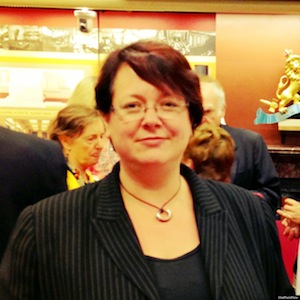

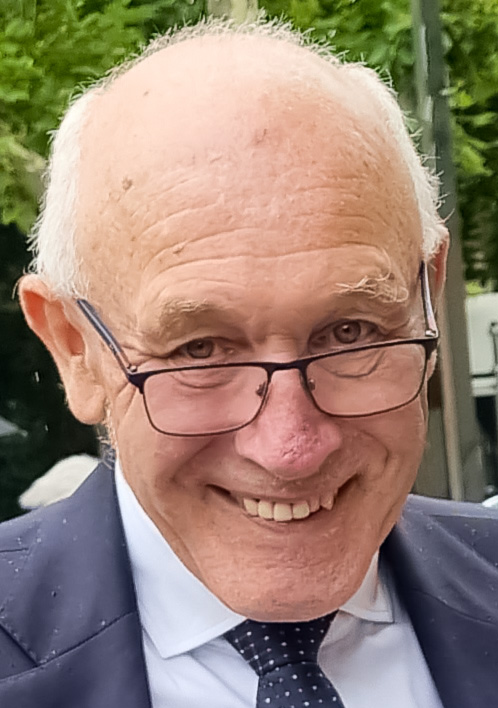

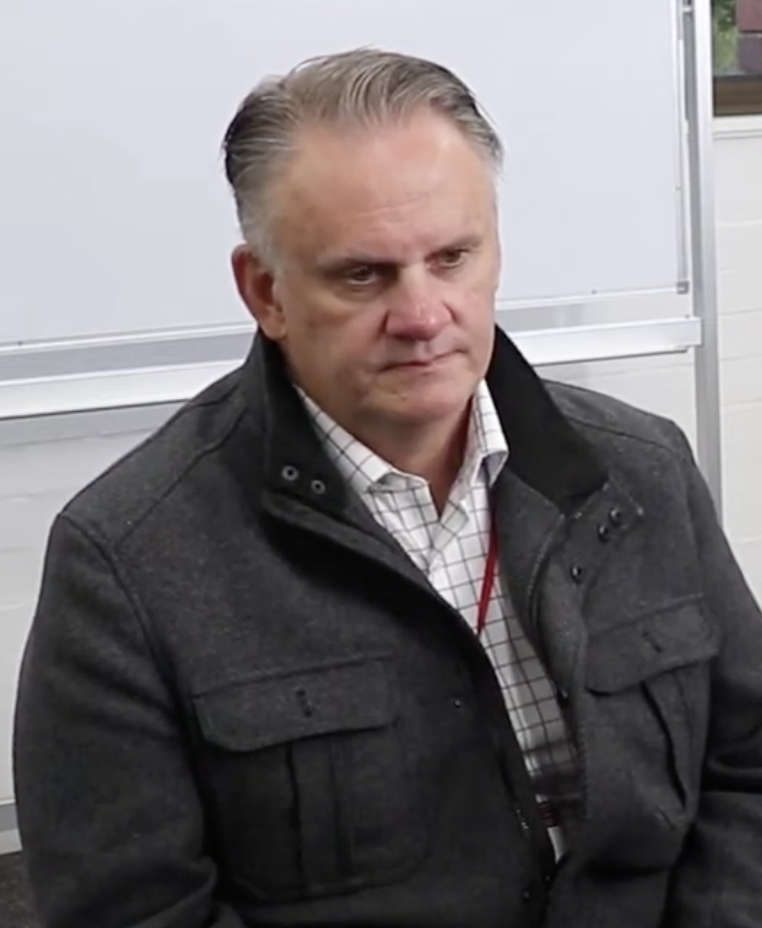

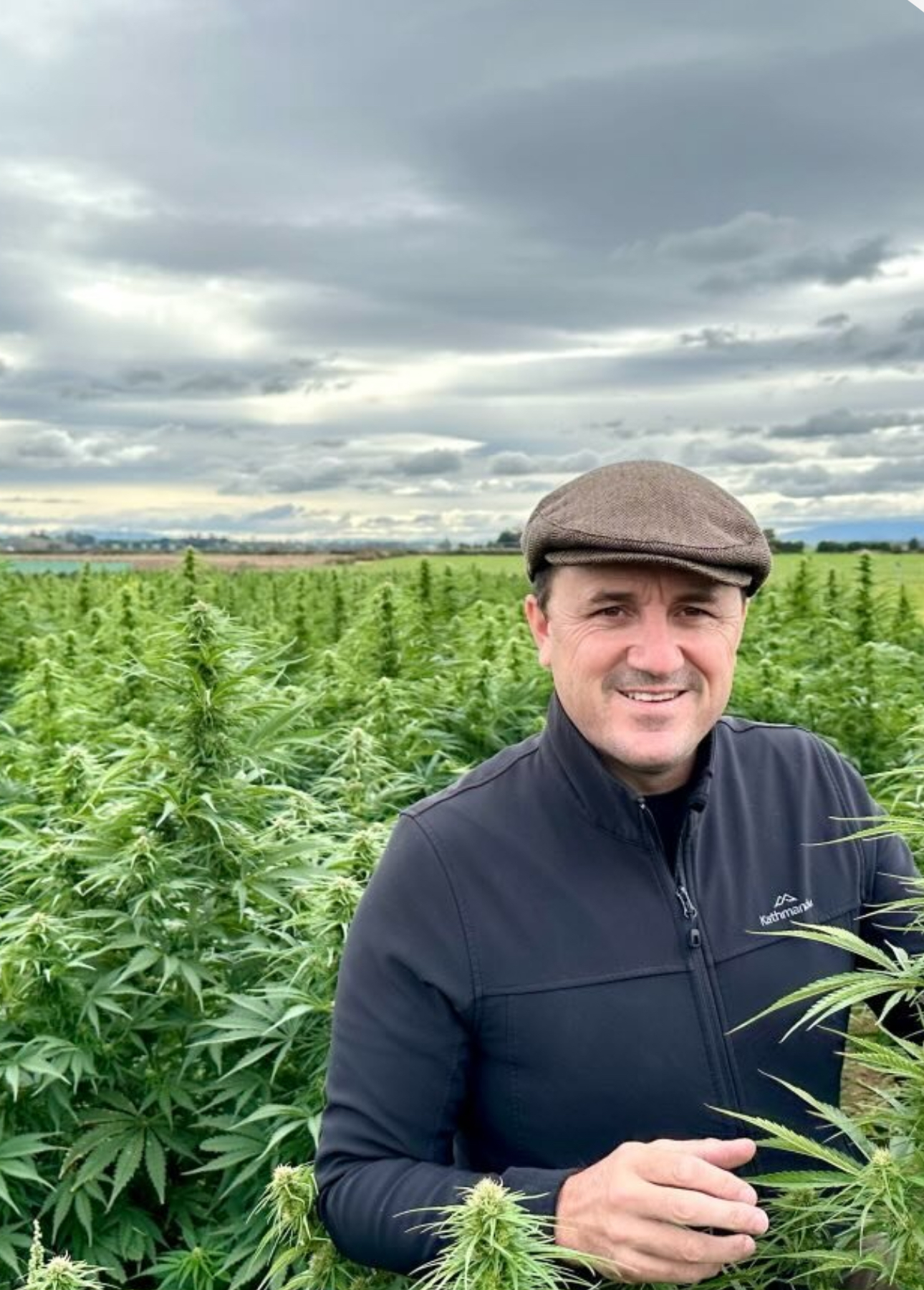

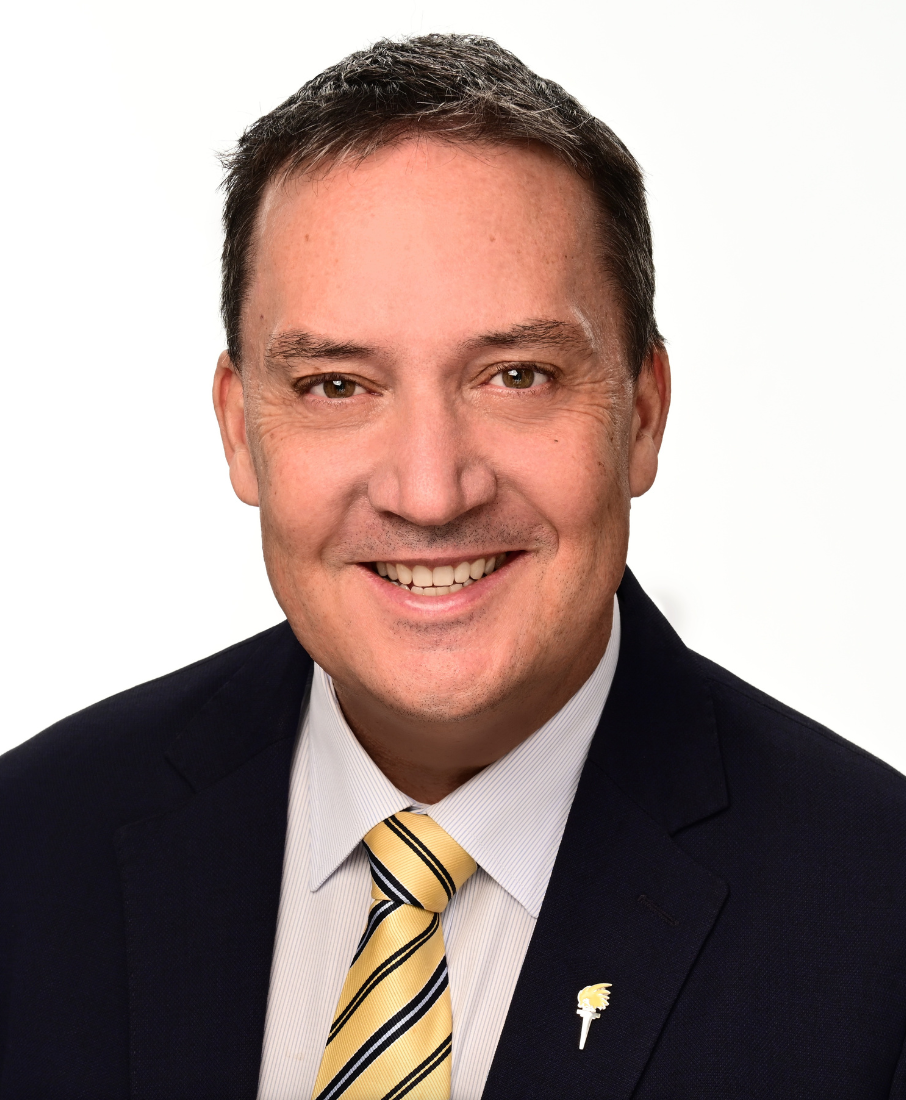
	First party	Second party	Third party
Leader	Penny Sharpe	Damien Tudehope	None
Party	Labor	Liberal/National coalition	Greens
Seats before	14	17	3
Seats won	8	7	2
Seats after	15	15	4
Seat change	▲1	▼2	▲1
Primary vote	1,690,445	1,374,857	419,346
Percentage	36.61%	29.78%	9.08%
Swing	▲6.93pp	▼5.04pp	▼0.64pp
	Fourth party	Fifth party	Sixth party
		SFF
Leader	Mark Latham	Robert Borsak	Jeremy Buckingham
Party	One Nation	Shooters	Legalise Cannabis
Seats before	2	2	0
Seats won	1	1	1
Seats after	3	2	1
Seat change	▲1	Steady	▲1
Primary vote	273,496	144,043	169,482
Percentage	5.92%	3.12%	3.67%
Swing	▼0.97pp	▼2.42pp	▲3.67pp
	Seventh party	Eighth party	Ninth party
		AJP	RAP
Leader	John Ruddick	None	Silvana Nile
Party	Liberal Democrats	Animal Justice	Revive Australia
Seats before	0	2	1
Seats won	1	0	0
Seats after	1	1	0
Seat change	▲1	▼1	▼1
Primary vote	162,755	101,183	2,507
Percentage	3.53%	2.19%	0.05%
Swing	▲1.35pp	▲0.24pp	▲0.05pp

The 2023 New South Wales Legislative Council election was held on 25 March 2023 to elect the 57th New South Wales Legislative Council.

The incumbent Liberal–National Coalition was seeking to retain its status as the largest party in the Council since the 2011 election, opposed by the Labor Party. The Greens, One Nation and several other minor parties also contested the election.

== Results ==
Legislative Council (STV) – Quota 209,858 – (CV)
Party	Votes	%	Swing	2023 seats	2019 seats	Total seats	Change
Labor	1,690,445	36.61	▲+6.93	8	7	15	▲1
Liberal/National joint ticket	1,374,857	29.78	▼–5.04	7	8	15	▼2
Greens	419,346	9.08	▼–0.64	2	2	4	▲1
One Nation	273,496	5.92	▼–0.97	1	2	3	▲1
Legalise Cannabis	169,482	3.67	New	1	0	1	▲1
Liberal Democrats	162,755	3.53	▲+1.35	1	0	1	▲1
Shooters, Fishers, Farmers	144,043	3.12	▼–2.42	1	1	2	Steady
Animal Justice	101,183	2.19	▲+0.24	0	1	1	▼1
Elizabeth Farrelly Independents	61,163	1.32	▼−0.51	0	0	0	Steady
Family First	58,361	1.26	New	0	0	0	Steady
Sustainable Australia	42,902	0.93	▼–0.53	0	0	0	Steady
Australia One	35,888	0.78	New	0	0	0	Steady
Public Education	34,523	0.75	New	0	0	0	Steady
Informed Medical Options	21,362	0.46	New	0	0	0	Steady
Socialist Alliance	17,056	0.37	▲+0.05	0	0	0	Steady
United Australia	3,891	0.08	New	0	0	0	Steady
Revive Australia	2,507	0.05	New	0	0	0	▼1
Independent	1,356	0.03	New	0	0	0	Steady
Ungrouped	965	0.02	New	0	0	0	▼1
Call To Freedom	722	0.02	New	0	0	0	Steady
Christians For Community	306	0.01	New	0	0	0	Steady
Socialist Equality	249	0.01	New	0	0	0	Steady
Formal votes	4,616,858	94.31	▲+0.66	–	–	–	–
Informal votes	278,477	5.69	▼−0.66	–	–	–	–
Total	4,895,335	100.00	–	21	21	42	–
Registered voters / turnout	5,521,688	88.66	▼−0.78	–	–	–	–

== Full results ==
2023 New South Wales state election: Legislative Council
Party	Candidate	Votes	%	±%
Quota		209,858		
Labor	1. Courtney Houssos (elected 1); 2. Rose Jackson (elected 5); 3. Cameron Murphy (elected 8); 4. Emily Suvaal (elected 10); 5. John Graham (elected 12); 6. Bob Nanva (elected 14); 7. Stephen Lawrence (elected 16); 8. Sarah Kaine (elected 17); 9. Mick Veitch; 10. Stewart Prins; 11. Michelle Miran; 12. Marion Browne; 13. Rizwan Chowdhury; 14. Shoaib Shams; 15. Paul Sekfy; 16. Pamela Ward; 17. Stef Chalmers; 18. Greg Davis; 19. Tori McGregor; 20. Lynne Fairey; 21. Lorraine Fordham	1,690,445	36.61	+6.93
Liberal/National Coalition	1. Natasha Maclaren-Jones (Lib) (elected 2); 2. Bronnie Taylor (Nat) (elected 6); 3. Chris Rath (Lib) (elected 9); 4. Susan Carter (Lib) (elected 11); 5. Ben Franklin (Nat) (elected 13); 6. Jacqui Munro (Lib) (elected 15); 7. Rachel Merton (Lib) (elected 21); 8. Scott Barrett (Nat); 9. Jag Dhaliwal (Lib); 10. Sophie White (Lib); 11. Ben Niland (Nat); 12. Ying Li-Cantwell (Lib); 13. Vicky McGahey (Lib); 14. Mirjana Cestar (Lib); 15. Steve Coxhead (Nat)	1,374,857	29.78	−5.04
Greens	1. Cate Faehrmann (elected 3); 2. Amanda Cohn (elected 7); 3. Lynda-June Coe; 4. Jim Casey; 5. Trish Frail; 6. Elizabeth Thompson; 7. Jane Scott; 8. Kashmir Miller; 9. Eddie Lloyd; 10. Lizz Atkins; 11. Mithra Cox; 12. Jan Davis; 13. Astrid O'Neill; 14. Vida Shahamat; 15. Tony Hickey; 16. Ismet Tastan; 17. Russell Weston; 18. Sylvie Ellsmore	419,346	9.08	−0.64
One Nation	1. Mark Latham (elected 4); 2. Tania Mihailuk; 3. Amit Batish; 4. Colin Grigg; 5. Roger Smith; 6. Steven Tripp; 7. Charlie Fenton; 8. Richard Orchard; 9. Adrian Saker; 10. Vicki Saker; 11. Alan Lanyon; 12. Quenten Roberts; 13. Nicholas Turner; 14. Samuel Donovan; 15. Anastasia Whittaker; 16. Kellie Rugless	273,496	5.92	−0.97
Legalise Cannabis	1. Jeremy Buckingham (elected 18); 2. James Mathison; 3. Gail Hester; 4. Michael Balderstone; 5. Karen Bruge; 6. Frances Hood; 7. Ross Smith; 8. Lincoln Ellis; 9. Nicole Lindner; 10. Elyas Dakhill; 11. Kathleen Williamson; 12. Ian Eden; 13. Louise Graves; 14. Donald Fuggle; 15. Max Green; 16. Michael Harper; 17. Crystal Best; 18. Reece Reynolds	169,482	3.67	+3.67
Liberal Democrats	1. John Ruddick (elected 19); 2. Millie Fontana; 3. Natalie Dumer; 4. Clinton Mead; 5. Elvis Sinosic; 6. John Larter; 7. Michael Wheeler; 8. Peter Whelan; 9. Phillip Beazley; 10. Michael Graham; 11. Robert Cribb; 12. Cameron Shamsabad; 13. Peter Runge; 14. Charles Rios; 15. Samuel Gunning; 16. Joaquim De Lima; 17. Matthew Manning	162,755	3.53	+1.35
Shooters, Fishers, Farmers	1. Robert Borsak (elected 20); 2. Shane Djuric; 3. Alain Noujaim; 4. Kyle Boddan; 5. Steven Richards; 6. William Thompson; 7. Alexander Powell; 8. Therese Noujaim; 9. Brian Boyle; 10. John Howden; 11. Kelly Lessage; 12. Raffaele Grasso; 13. Angelique Noujaim; 14. Moses El Salim; 15. Mark Van Bysterveld; 16. Grant Cappetta; 17. Joe Rossi	144,043	3.12	−2.42
Animal Justice	1. Alison Waters; 2. Louise Ward; 3. Matt Stellino; 4. Catherine Blasonato; 5. Petra Jones; 6. Patrick Murphy; 7. Naomi Woodgate; 8. Ann Janaway; 9. Catherine Ward; 10. Sussannah Waters; 11. Teresa Tomanovsky; 12. Jordy Bertram; 13. Kramer Thompson; 14. Ellie Robertson; 15. Christine Hahn; 16. Kate Paterson; 17. Lana Mueller	101,183	1.95	+0.24
Elizabeth Farrelly Independents	1. Elizabeth Farrelly; 2. Teresa Russell; 3. Sunil Badami; 4. Philippa Murray; 5. Hugo Chan; 6. Jennifer Crawford; 7. Anne Crawford; 8. Caroline Pidcock; 9. Julie Walton; 10. Jane Stanham; 11. Rose Ricketson; 12. Andrew Potts; 13. Deni McKenzie; 14. Marie Sheehan; 15. Freddy Sharpe; 16. Edilla Ford	61,163	1.32	+1.32
Family First	1. Lyle Shelton; 2. Barbara Helvadjian; 3. Don Modarelli; 4. Richard Stretton; 5. Jamie Green; 6. Robyn Butt; 7. Graham McLennan; 8. Craig Dengate; 9. Nathaniel Marsh; 10. Tracey Bradbury; 11. Penelope Windeyer; 12. Benjamin Irawan; 13. Prue Duignan; 14. Glen Ryan; 15. Michael Chaplin	58,361	1.26	+1.26
Sustainable Australia	1. William Bourke; 2. Hana Oh; 3. Bradd Morelli; 4. Deborah Smythe; 5. Herman Kuipers; 6. Xiaowei Yue; 7. Torsten Landwehr; 8. John Alden; 9. Lisa Hilleard; 10. Peter Reid; 11. Jill Green; 12. Ann Burke; 13. Mike Cottee; 14. David Taylor; 15. Susan Kitchener; 16. Michael Wilder; 17. Alison Noonan; 18. Robert Eggleton; 19. Cheryl Blacker; 20. Alan Magnusson; 21. Dean Winter	42,902	0.93	−0.53
Australia One	1. Riccardo Bosi; 2. David Graham; 3. Jackie George; 4. Franco Todisco; 5. David Heath; 6. Garry Mckinlay; 7. Frank Kloepfer; 8. Reagan Kloepfer; 9. Robyn George; 10. Logan George; 11. Scott Bowden; 12. Kevin Walker; 13. Luke George; 14. Brad Kirkels; 15. Barbara Kafer; 16. Noel Anderson; 17. Matt Polin; 18. Josephine Fsadni	35,888	0.78	+0.78
Public Education	1. Khalil Khay; 2. Cheryl McBride; 3. Anne Flint; 4. Peter Furness; 5. Edith McNally; 6. Barbara Reynolds; 7. Penelope Hackett; 8. Warren Poole; 9. Neil Robertson; 10. Sue Robertson; 11. Gemma Ackroyd; 12. Hugh Ackroyd; 13. Sandi Steep; 14. Harry Fox; 15. Lynne Fox; 16. Kerryanne Knox; 17. Vicki Walsh	34,523	0.75	+0.75
Informed Medical Options	1. Michael O'Neill; 2. Marelle Burnum; 3. Lesley Kinney; 4. Kevin Mund; 5. Alison Davies; 6. Robyn Curnow; 7. Megan Bennetts; 8. Christeena Middleton; 9. Karen Burke; 10. Gerard O'Neill; 11. Wan Otto; 12. Benjamin Fox; 13. Craig Grech; 14. Monica Shepherd; 15. Graham Taylor; 16. Karen Tittelbach; 17. Ian Davies; 18. John Fenwick	21,362	0.46	+0.46
Socialist Alliance	1. Steve O'Brien; 2. Paula Sanchez; 3. Andrew Chuter; 4. Samantha Ashby; 5. Joel McAlear; 6. Steffi Leedham; 7. Jim McIlroy; 8. Coral Wynter; 9. Isaac Nellist; 10. Pip Hinman; 11. Peter Boyle; 12. Federico Fuentes; 13. Ben Radford; 14. Duncan Roden; 15. James Wyner	17,056	0.37	+0.05
United Australia	1. Craig Kelly; 2. Andrew Robertson; 3. Rosemary Saad; 4. Anne Khoury; 5. Dean Mackin; 6. Robert Nalbandian; 7. Amber Robertson; 8. M. Wrightson; 9. Philip Kelly	3,891	0.08	+0.08
Revive Australia	1. Silvana Nile; 2. Fred Nile	2,507	0.05	+0.05
Group P	1. Danny Lim; 2. Lee Lim	1,356	0.03	+0.03
Call To Freedom	1. Milan Maksimovic; 2. Deborah Lions; 3. Mianda Villatora	722	0.02	+0.02
Christians For Community	1. Milton Caine; 2. Robert Skillin	306	0.01	+0.01
Socialist Equality	1. Oscar Grenfell; 2. Mike Head	249	0.01	+0.01
Independent	Guitang Lu	158	0.00	+0.00
Indigenous-Aboriginal	Colleen Fuller	156	0.00	+0.00
Independent	Stefan Prasad	153	0.00	+0.00
Homes First	Lee Howe	134	0.00	+0.00
Independent	Michelle Martin	89	0.00	+0.00
Independent	Van Huynh	83	0.00	+0.00
Independent	George Potkonyak	74	0.00	+0.00
Independent	Mick Allen	39	0.00	+0.00
Independent	Archie Lea	35	0.00	+0.00
Independent	Warren Grzic	33	0.00	+0.00
Independent	Ruth Cheetham	11	0.00	+0.00
Total formal votes		4,616,858	94.31	+0.66
Informal votes		278,477	5.69	−0.66
Turnout		4,895,335	88.66	−0.78

== Continuing members ==
The following members of the Legislative Council were not up for re-election this year.

Party	Member
Labor	Mark Buttigieg
Labor	Anthony D'Adam
Labor	Greg Donnelly
Labor	Daniel Mookhey
Labor	Tara Moriarty
Labor	Peter Primrose
Labor	Penny Sharpe
Liberal	Aileen MacDonald
Liberal	Taylor Martin
Liberal	Damien Tudehope
Liberal	Natalie Ward
Liberal	Casual vacancy
National	Wes Fang
National	Sam Farraway
National	Sarah Mitchell
Greens	Abigail Boyd
Greens	Sue Higginson
One Nation	Rod Roberts
One Nation	Casual vacancy
Shooters, Fishers, Farmers	Mark Banasiak
Animal Justice	Emma Hurst
