= List of New South Wales Legislative Council appointments =

This is a list of appointments to the New South Wales Legislative Council, caused by the resignation or death of an incumbent member. A departure creates a casual vacancy which is filled by a candidate of the same affiliation in a joint sitting of the Parliament of New South Wales. The Constitution of New South Wales states that if the previous sitting Legislative Council member was at the time of his/her election the representative of a particular political party, the nominated candidate for the vacancy must be a member of that same party.

The current system has existed since amendments in 1991. From 1934 until the 1978 electoral reforms, which introduced direct election of members of the Legislative Council, casual vacancies were filled by a vote of a joint sitting, not necessarily with a member of the same party. From 1978 until the 1991 amendments, casual vacancies were filled by the highest-polling unelected member of the party's ticket from the previous election who nominated for the vacancy, who would then be declared elected by the Governor, with a provision for joint sittings only where no one could be chosen by the former method.

== List of appointments to the Legislative Council ==
Date	Incumbent	Party	Appointee	Party	Cause
13 February 2025	Sam Farraway	National	Nichole Overall	National	Resignation
10 May 2023	Natasha Maclaren-Jones	Liberal	Scott Farlow	Liberal	Resignation
10 May 2023	Mark Latham	Pauline Hanson's One Nation	Tania Mihailuk	Pauline Hanson's One Nation	Resignation
11 August 2022	Catherine Cusack	Liberal	Aileen MacDonald	Liberal	Resignation
12 May 2022	David Shoebridge	Greens	Sue Higginson	Greens	Resignation
24 March 2022	Don Harwin	Liberal	Chris Rath	Liberal	Resignation
24 March 2022	Trevor Khan	National	Scott Barrett	National	Resignation
6 May 2021	John Ajaka	Liberal	Peter Poulos	Liberal	Resignation
17 October 2019	Niall Blair	National	Sam Farraway	National	Resignation
8 May 2019	Lynda Voltz	Labor	Rose Jackson	Labor	Resignation
8 May 2019	Ben Franklin	National	Ben Franklin	National	Resignation
15 August 2018	Mehreen Faruqi	Greens	Cate Faehrmann	Greens	Resignation
16 November 2017	Greg Pearce	Liberal	Natalie Ward	Liberal	Resignation
9 August 2017	Duncan Gay	National	Wes Fang	National	Resignation
3 May 2017	Mike Gallacher	Independent ^{[a]}	Taylor Martin	Liberal	Resignation
22 February 2017	Jan Barham	Greens	Dawn Walker	Greens	Resignation
12 October 2016	Sophie Cotsis	Labor	John Graham	Labor	Resignation
24 August 2016	John Kaye	Greens	Justin Field	Greens	Death
6 May 2015	Penny Sharpe	Labor	Penny Sharpe	Labor	Resignation
6 May 2015	Steve Whan	Labor	Daniel Mookhey	Labor	Resignation
19 June 2013	Cate Faehrmann	Greens	Mehreen Faruqi	Greens	Resignation
23 May 2013	Eric Roozendaal	Labor	Ernest Wong	Labor	Resignation
20 June 2011	Tony Kelly	Labor	Steve Whan	Labor	Resignation
24 May 2011	John Hatzistergos	Labor	Adam Searle	Labor	Resignation
24 May 2011	Eddie Obeid	Labor	Walt Secord	Labor	Resignation
7 September 2010	Sylvia Hale	Greens	David Shoebridge	Greens	Resignation
7 September 2010	Roy Smith	Shooters	Robert Borsak	Shooters	Death
7 September 2010	John Della Bosca	Labor	Sophie Cotsis	Labor	Resignation
7 September 2010	Lee Rhiannon	Greens	Cate Faehrmann	Greens	Resignation
10 June 2010	Ian Macdonald	Labor	Luke Foley	Labor	Resignation
3 December 2009	Henry Tsang	Labor	Shaoquett Moselmane	Labor	Resignation
23 September 2008	Michael Costa	Labor	John Robertson	Labor	Resignation
28 September 2006	Patricia Forsythe	Liberal	Matthew Mason-Cox	Liberal	Resignation
11 October 2005	Carmel Tebbutt	Labor	Penny Sharpe	Labor	Resignation
21 October 2004	Fred Nile	Christian Democrats	Fred Nile	Christian Democrats	Resignation
24 June 2004	Tony Burke	Labor	Eric Roozendaal	Labor	Resignation
3 September 2002	Elaine Nile	Christian Democrats	Gordon Moyes	Christian Democrats	Resignation
3 September 2002	Doug Moppett	National	Melinda Pavey	National	Resignation
6 November 2001	Johno Johnson	Labor	Michael Costa	Labor	Resignation
1 November 2000	Andy Manson	Labor	Ian West	Labor	Resignation
1 November 2000	John Hannaford	Labor	Greg Pearce	Labor	Resignation
30 August 2000	Richard Bull	National	Rick Colless	National	Resignation
30 August 2000	Jeff Shaw	Labor	Amanda Fazio	Labor	Resignation
25 June 1998	Elisabeth Kirkby	Democrats	Arthur Chesterfield-Evans	Democrats	Resignation
30 April 1998	Ann Symonds	Labor	Carmel Tebbutt	Labor	Resignation
17 September 1997	Patricia Staunton	Labor	Tony Kelly	Labor	Resignation
17 April 1996	Stephen Mutch	Liberal	Mike Gallacher	Liberal	Resignation
17 April 1996	Paul O'Grady	Labor	Peter Primrose	Labor	Resignation
19 October 1995	Ted Pickering	Liberal	Charlie Lynn	Liberal	Resignation
19 September 1995	Robert Webster	National	Mark Kersten	National	Resignation
12 September 1991	Jack Hallam	Labor	Eddie Obeid	Labor	Resignation
21 August 1991	Adrian Solomons	National	Lloyd Coleman	National	Resignation

== See also ==
- List of New South Wales state by-elections

== Notes ==
^{a} Gallacher was elected as a Liberal Party member in the 2011 state election. He resigned from the Liberals in 2014 and sat as an independent until his resignation.
