= Tony Sheldon =

Tony Sheldon may refer to:

- Tony Sheldon (actor) (born 1955), Australian theatre actor, singer and writer
- Tony Sheldon (politician) (born 1961), Australian politician and trade unionist
