= 2025 Sydney Harbour Bridge protest =

Pro-Palestine protests in Sydney

- Part of the Gaza war protests in Australia
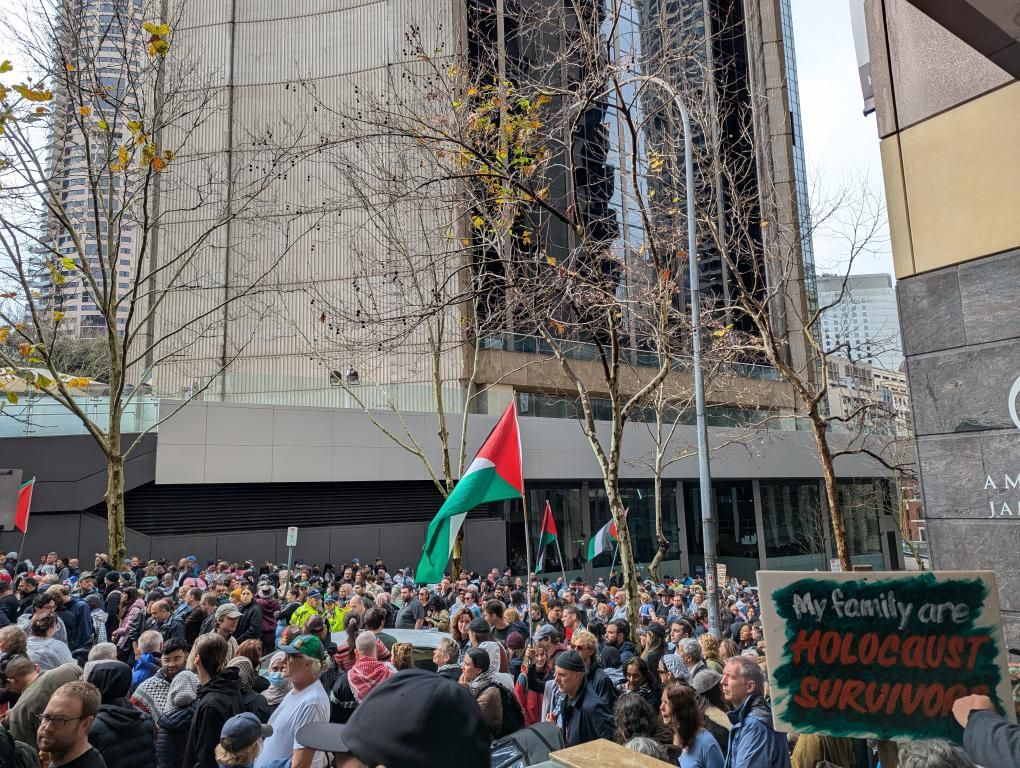
- A crowd of protesters during the march towards the bridge, with visible Palestinian flags.
- Date: 3 August 2025
- Time: 1:00 pm–4:00 pm (AEST)
- Duration: ~3 hours
- Venue: Sydney Harbour Bridge
- Location: Sydney, Australia
- Also known as: March for Humanity
- Type: Mass procession, demonstration, protest rally
- Cause: Gaza Strip famine and Gaza genocide
- Motive: Showing solidarity with the Palestinians of the Gaza Strip
- Organised by: Palestine Action Group
- Participants: 90,000 (police estimate); 225,000–300,000 (organisers and independent sources)

The 2025 Sydney Harbour Bridge protest was a pro-Palestine protest that occurred on 3 August 2025 on the Harbour Bridge in Sydney, Australia. It was organised by the Palestine Action Group, who called it the "March for Humanity".

== Background ==
The purpose of the protest was to express support of Palestinian people, raise awareness of the situation in Gaza, and pressure the Australian government to sanction Israel. Former New South Wales premier Bob Carr attended the protest and said in a statement that protesters "want the Netanyahu government's humanitarian blockade to stop, the starvation and the killing to end".

Palestine Action Group had held smaller protests in Sydney every Sunday since 7 October 2023 at a much smaller scale than this event.

=== Transport ===
Transport for NSW urged people to avoid all non-essential travel on the day of the protest, saying that the bridge blockade would cause a "flow on" effect for traffic in other areas of the city.

=== Police response ===
NSW Police had requested a court order to block the protest over concerns of public safety. This followed a 2022 legislation by the NSW government that made it an offence to cause distruption to major roads, which was created in response to climate change activists protesting in major roads in Port Botany.

Acting commissioner Peter McKenna said the police would apply to the Supreme Court of New South Wales to classify the protest as unlawful. During the hearing, an overflow room was created for observers due to the number of people wanting to attend.

The Supreme Court of New South Wales denied the application brought by NSW Police. Justice Belinda Rigg, said the claim that the protest would cause significant disruption was "far from determinative" for the protest to be unlawful since doing so would mean that "no assembly involving inconvenience would be permitted". Rather, Rigg stated that "It is in the nature of peaceful protests to cause disruption to others." and that Palestine for Action had "compellingly" explained their reason for believing the protest was needed. Palestine Action Group argued that the use of the bridge would be a "powerful message" and that bridge has been closed down for "lesser reasons" such as filming movies. They also warned of a "potential for violence" if the police were able to arrest people for attending the protest. Rigg decided in favour of Palestine Action Group, stating that "the public interest in freedom of expression, at this time, in the manner contemplated, for the reasons advanced, is very high". She rejected any suggestion that her decision would condone any antisocial or behaviour or violence.

The protest was approved the day before it was to take place, causing NSW Police to reorganise their plans quickly. Palestine Action Group, the organisers of the protest, had said that they would continue regardless of the outcome of the police request, saying on Facebook "whatever happens, see you on Sunday".

== March ==
The march was officially called the "March for Humanity". Protesters started at Lang Park in Wynyard before crossing the bridge, and finished at Bradfield Park in North Sydney. The bridge was closed in both directions at 11:30 am, and protesters began to cross around 1:00 pm.

The bridge was planned to be reopened at 4:00 pm, but due to the size of the protest, the bridge stayed closed for longer than originally planned. The Harbour tunnel remained open and trains still crossed the bridge during the closure. Around 700 to 1000 police officers were stationed during the protest. Some protesters carried pots and pans as symbols of the starvation in Gaza.

=== Shutdown ===
At 3:00 pm, police sent out a mass text message to phones in Sydney ordering the protest be stopped due to safety concerns. A police helicopter was stationed over the protest ordering people to walk back towards the city. The Palestine Action Group said that there were "too many people" and co-operated with police. The mass message read "In consultation with the organisers, the march needs to stop due to public safety and await further instructions." Protesters were asked to turn around and walk back to Wynyard, rather than continuing north past the bridge.

The bridge was reopened by 5:00 pm.

=== Attendance ===
Prior to the day, around 50,000 people were expected to attend.

The large number of protesters led to concerns of crowd crushing. During the march, police estimated there were 50,000–100,000 protesters. Acting police commissioner Peter McKenna gave an estimate of 90,000 people immediately after the protest, while Action for Palestine said the numbers could be as high as 300,000. Dr Aldo Raineri, an expert in crowd safety management at the Central Queensland University, estimated that 225,000 – 300,000 people attended based on drone footage.

Acting Assistant Police Commissioner Adam Johnson said that the numbers made police concerned about lives being lost, and called the situation "perilous".

Among the protesters were WikiLeaks founder Julian Assange, activist and former soccer player Craig Foster, Greens senator Mehreen Faruqi, former state premier Bob Carr, boxer Anthony Mundine, journalist Antoinette Lattouf, journalist Antony Loewenstein, actor Meyne Wyatt, writer Randa Abdel-Fattah, City of Sydney Lord Mayor Clover Moore, former government minister Ed Husic, journalist Mary Kostakidis, and political commentator Maram Susli. Several MPs from the New South Wales state parliament also participated including Jihad Dib, a minister in the state government, and federal Labor senators including Tony Sheldon. John Ruddick Libertarian also participated.

Following the protest, Wynyard and Town Hall train stations were closed after becoming too crowded with protesters. Many participants wore raincoats and carried umbrellas to protect themselves from heavy rain.

== Co-occurring protests ==
At the same time as the Harbour Bridge protest, an estimated 25,000 protesters gathered at the State Library Victoria in Melbourne. Free Palestine Coalition, the organisers, said that their protest was in solidarity with the Sydney one. The protesters were met by a blockade of police in riot gear when they attempted to cross the King Street Bridge. No arrests were made.

== Response ==
Josh Lees, the protest organiser from the Palestinian Action Group, said the march called for full sanctions and a complete stop of arms sales to Israel, and for aid to enter Gaza. Lees stated an increase in awareness in Australia over the situation in Gaza led to support from various church groups, unions and parliamentary representatives and he described the protest crowd as drawn from a wide part of society. Support for the march was expressed by Amnesty International, the Jewish Council of Australia, and the nurses and midwives association and other trade unions.

The Executive Council of Australian Jewry expressed disapproval of the court ruling to allow the protest. Executive Council co-chair Alex Ryvchin later said "Our national landmarks are there to bring Australians together. This march did not do that." Different perspectives on the protest were presented by Australian media in their reporting. In The West Australian, they described the event as chaotic and unpatriotic, while The Sydney Morning Herald focused on the crowds in Sydney saying enough.

=== Australian politicians ===
The march was criticised by Liberal Party leader Sussan Ley, who said that the protest "doesn't sound peaceful" and questioned the bridge being shut down. Premier Chris Minns also expressed opposition to the march, especially the location, which led to some criticism by his own party. Minns later said that he believed the protesters had the "right intentions" and respected that they were peaceful and followed police instructions.

Stephen Lawrence of the state Labor Party criticised what he called the state's "slow and steady demonisation of protest" comparing it to the police violence during the first Gay and Lesbian Mardi Gras in Sydney in 1978. The day after the protest, Prime Minister Anthony Albanese said that it was "not surprising" that so many people attended, and praised the peaceful nature of the protest. The day after the protest, his government sent another AU$20 million in humantiarian aid to Gaza.

Australian Assistant Minister for Foreign Affairs Matt Thistlethwaite expressed disapproval of the use of Ayatollah Ali Khamenei's photo on a protest sign, but said that the protest was peaceful overall. Ed Husic, who attended the march, said the protest showed that the government had underestimated how "deeply [people] feel and how much they want governments to act on the concerns that they have."

=== Israeli politicians ===
Israeli Foreign Minister Gideon Sa'ar criticised the march, and said on X (Twitter) "The distorted alliance between the radical Left and fundamentalist Islam is sadly dragging the West toward the sidelines of history" with a photo of a protester holding a sign with a photo of Iranian leader Ayatollah Ali Khamenei. In response to the image of Ayatollah Ali Khamenei, which was visible in photos of the front of the protest with notable Australian politicians and activists, Israeli Deputy Foreign Minister Sharren Haskel described the protesters as "useful idiots of extreme Islam" and said that many of the people protesting, such as women and queer people "wouldn’t survive a day in Iran".

== See also ==
- March for Gaza
- Australia–Israel relations
- March for Australia
