= Josh for NSW =

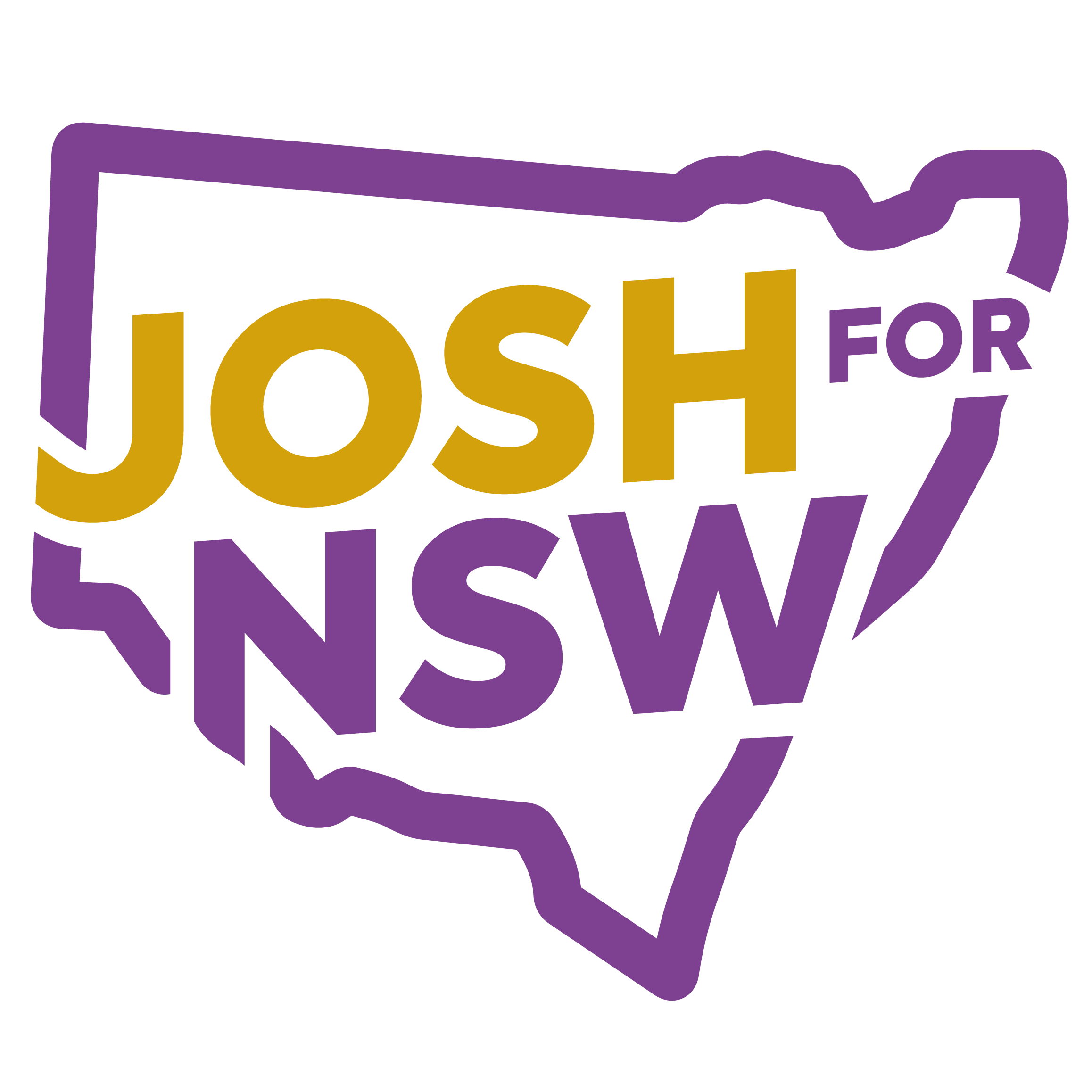
- Leader: Josh Kirsh
- Founded: 5 February 2026
- Headquarters: Sydney, New South Wales, Australia
- NSW Legislative Council: 0 / 93

Website
- www.joshfornsw.com.au

Josh for NSW is an Australian political party registered in New South Wales, established in 2026 to support the NSW Legislative Council candidacy of Josh Kirsh at the 2027 New South Wales state election. Kirsh, a Sydney lawyer and community advocate, is running as an independent candidate, making Josh for NSW a single-candidate party vehicle for upper house representation.

== History ==
=== Formation ===
Josh for NSW was registered as a political party with the NSW Electoral Commission on 5 February 2026. The party was established to support the Legislative Council candidacy of Josh Kirsh, a Sydney-based lawyer, public servant, and community advocate.

Kirsh had previously served as an elected deputy of the NSW Jewish Board of Deputies since 2018 and as Chair of its Social Justice Committee, as well as director of youth advocacy organisation Youth HEAR, before stepping down from those roles to campaign. He also served as president of the Australasian Union of Jewish Students (AUJS) in 2020.

=== Announcement ===
Kirsh publicly announced his candidacy in 2025. Speaking to The Australian Jewish News, he called for new approaches to longstanding policy problems, stating that communities across NSW were being failed by political inaction. He indicated that he aimed to become the first truly independent member elected to the NSW Legislative Council.

Kirsh appeared as a witness before two NSW Parliamentary inquiries: the inquiry into antisemitism in New South Wales (2025) and the inquiry into measures to combat right-wing extremism in New South Wales, at which he appeared as Director of Youth HEAR.

== Platform ==
Josh for NSW has identified five priority policy areas.

=== Mental health ===
The party advocates for increased funding for integrated mental health services in New South Wales, with a focus on accessible community-based care.

=== Literacy ===
Kirsh has proposed a target of an 85 per cent literacy rate across New South Wales by 2035, with policy focused on early intervention and educational support.

=== Night-time economy ===
The party has proposed reforms to revitalise Sydney's night-time economy, including wage subsidies for hospitality venues employing staff past 9pm and a voucher scheme modelled on the NSW Government's "Dine & Discover" program. Kirsh has noted that approximately 70 per cent of core night-time economy businesses in the City of Sydney close by 9pm.

=== Climate ===
Josh for NSW has proposed the establishment of a NSW Climate Corps to assist in the transition of the state's energy grid toward renewable sources.

=== Housing ===
The party has identified youth homelessness and housing affordability as priority concerns, though specific policy proposals had not been publicly released as of early 2026.

== Candidate ==
Josh Kirsh is a Sydney lawyer and public servant. He has described himself as a community advocate with experience in parliamentary submissions and public inquiries. So far, Kirsh is the sole candidate endorsed by Josh for NSW and is contesting the NSW Legislative Council at the 2027 New South Wales state election.

== Electoral history ==
Election	Chamber	Votes	%	Seats	Result
2027 New South Wales state election	NSW Legislative Council	—	—	0 / 93	Pending

== See also ==
- 2027 New South Wales state election
- NSW Legislative Council
- Independent politician
