= Rachel Merton =

Australian politician

The Hon. Rachel Merton MLC
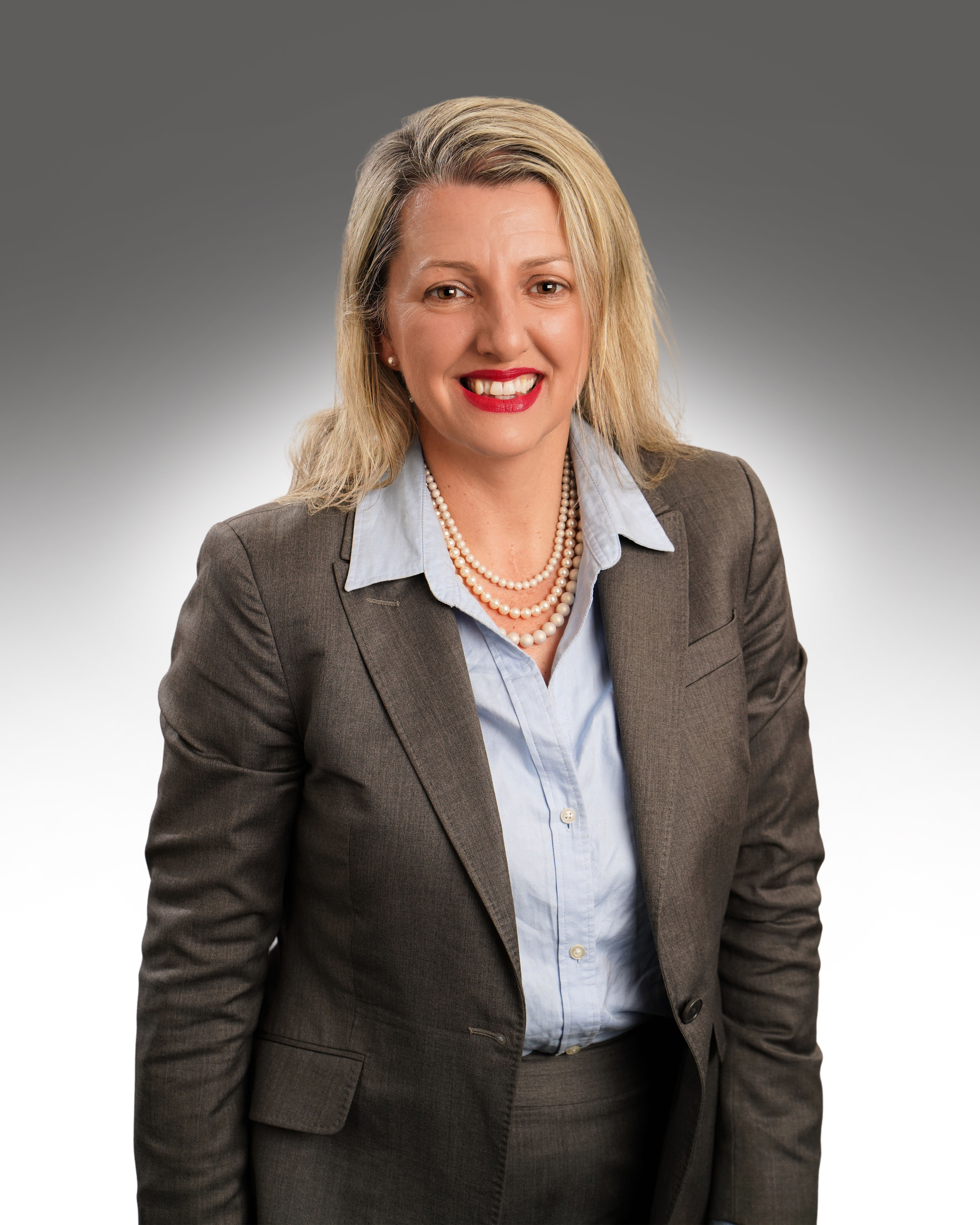

Member of the New South Wales Legislative Council
- Incumbent
- Assumed office 20 April 2023

Personal details
- Party: NSW Liberal
- Parent: Wayne Merton (father)
- Occupation: Politician

Rachel Victoria Merton is an Australian politician from the Liberal Party of New South Wales. She was elected to the New South Wales Legislative Council in the 2023 New South Wales state election.

== Political career ==
Merton joined the Young Liberals at age 16 and served as President of the Macquarie University Liberal Club where she graduated with a Bachelor of Arts. Merton worked as an adviser in the Federal Government of John Howard and held the position of Chief of Staff to the Parliamentary Secretary to The Treasurer up until the 2004 federal election. She was the Liberal candidate in Wentworthville at the 1999 NSW Election. Between 2005 and 2018, she worked at KPMG Australia occupying a role in Risk Management before becoming Head of Government Relations.

In 2017, Merton was narrowly defeated by Natalie Ward for Liberal Party selection to fill the New South Wales Legislative Council vacancy created by the resignation of Greg Pearce, despite having the endorsements of John Howard, Scott Morrison and Tony Abbott.

In 2019, Merton was appointed by the Federal Government as a full-time Board Member of the Australian Classification Board. In 2022 she was named as the Deputy Chief of Staff to the NSW Minister for Families, Communities and Disability Services before contesting the 2023 NSW Election.

In March 2023, Merton was placed seventh on the Coalition ticket and won the 21st and final spot in the Legislative Council at the State Election, defeating the Animal Justice Party by just over 10,000 votes. She currently serves as Deputy Chair of the Legislative Council’s Education Portfolio Committee and is a member of the Legislative Council Standing Committee on Social Issues and the Joint Standing Committee on the Ombudsman, the Law Enforcement Conduct Commission and the Crime Commission.

== Political Advocacy ==
Merton is a member of the National Right faction of the NSW Liberal Party.

In her role as a Member of the Legislative Council, Merton has advocated for retaining constitutional monarchy, establishing the first pro-constitutional monarchy 'NSW Parliamentary Friends of the Australian Constitution'; she was a leading figure in the NO to the Voice campaign that opposed the proposed referendum to establish an Aboriginal and Torres Strait Islander Voice to Parliament; she was the first speaker to oppose the controversial extensions to the NSW Government's abortion laws helping spearhead changes that ultimately protected faith-based hospitals.

== Education ==
Merton attended Ravenswood School for Girls, Gordon and Macquarie University where she graduated with a Bachelor of Arts serving as President of the Liberal Club.

== Personal life ==
Merton is married to Justin Owen, who serves as Deputy President of the Administrative Appeals Tribunal, and has two daughters.

Her father, Wayne Merton represented the electorates of Carlingford between 1988 and 1991 and Baulkham Hills between 1991 and 2011 for the Liberal Party.

Rachel is a member of the Institute for Public Affairs, the Samuel Griffith Society and is an active supporter of the North Sydney Bears.

== See also ==
- Members of the New South Wales Legislative Council, 2023–2027
