= Sarah Kaine =

Australian politician

The Hon. Sarah Kaine PhD MLC

Member of the New South Wales Legislative Council
- Incumbent
- Assumed office 20 April 2023

Personal details
- Party: NSW Labor
- Spouse: Tony Sheldon (divorced)
- Education: University of Sydney
- Occupation: Politician

Sarah Kaine is an Australian politician, academic and trade unionist. She was elected as a Member of the New South Wales Legislative Council at the 2023 state election.

== Career ==
Kaine earned an economics degree with honours at the University of Sydney in 1996 while working at the AWU before going on to become an organiser at the ACTU. She completed a PhD in Industrial Relations at the University of Sydney in 2010 and was an associate professor at the Management Discipline Group at University of Technology Sydney (UTS) for ten years. Her research has focused on organised labour and the role of women in the workplace and the labour movement. She has been a public commentator on workplace issues.

Kaine was elected President of the NTEU NSW Division and staff representative on UTS Council. Kaine was Vice-President of the NSW Labor and Chair of NSW ALP Women's Forum. She was a director of the McKell Institute for a decade and is a member of the Arncliffe–Wolli Creek Branch of Labor.

In 2020, Kaine became Director of Industrial Relations Compliance in the NSW Department of Premier and Cabinet.

At the 2023 New South Wales state election, she was the eighth candidate on NSW Labor's ticket for the Legislative Council and was elected.

In October 2023, Kaine signed an open letter which condemned attacks against Israeli and Palestinian civilians during the Gaza war. In August 2025, Kaine attended the March for Humanity in Sydney, a large protest highlighting the plight of Palestinians in the Gaza conflict.

== Personal life ==
Kaine resides in Bardwell Park. She completed high school at Saint Ursula's College, Kingsgrove in 1992 and had children prior to completing her PhD. Her brother is Michael Kaine, National Secretary of the Transport Workers' Union of Australia. Kaine was married to federal Labor senator Tony Sheldon.
