= Mark Banasiak =

Member of the New South Wales Legislative Council

The Honourable Mark Banasiak MLC

Member of the New South Wales Legislative Council
- Incumbent
- Assumed office 23 March 2019

Personal details
- Born: 1981 or 1982 (age 44–45)
- Party: Shooters, Fishers and Farmers Party

Mark Jared Banasiak is an Australian politician. He has been a member of the New South Wales Legislative Council since 2019, representing the Shooters, Fishers and Farmers Party.

Banasiak was president of the Sporting Shooters Association before his election. He defeated sitting MLC Robert Brown for preselection to lead the Shooters, Fishers and Farmers Party ticket prior to the 2019 New South Wales state election.
