= Tony Sheldon (politician) =

Australian trade unionist and politician

Senator Tony Sheldon
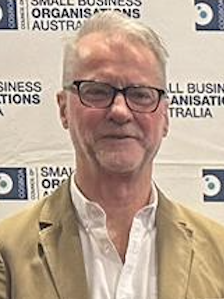
- Sheldon in 2023

Senator for New South Wales
- Incumbent
- Assumed office 1 July 2019

Special Envoy for Disaster Recovery
- Incumbent
- Assumed office 24 July 2022
- Prime Minister: Anthony Albanese
- Preceded by: Position established

Personal details
- Born: Anthony Vincent Sheldon; 26 August 1961 (age 65) Caringbah, New South Wales, Australia
- Party: Labor
- Spouse: Sarah Kaine (divorced)
- Children: 2
- Education: De La Salle College, Cronulla; University of New South Wales; Harvard Trade Union Program
- Occupation: Trade unionist

Anthony Vincent Sheldon (born 26 August 1961) is an Australian politician and trade unionist. He is a member of the Australian Labor Party (ALP) and has served as a Senator for New South Wales since 2019. He was previously a senior figure in the Transport Workers Union (TWU), serving as state secretary (1999–2008) and national secretary (2006–2019).

== Early life ==
Sheldon was born on 26 August 1961 in Caringbah, New South Wales. He attended De La Salle College, Cronulla. He worked as a cleaner, bartender and garbage collector prior to becoming a professional unionist. He undertook postgraduate studies in industrial law at the University of New South Wales and is also a graduate of Harvard Trade Union Program.

== Transport Workers Union ==
Sheldon joined the TWU in the 1990s. He led the NSW branch of TWU from 1999 to 2008 and was elected TWU National Secretary in 2006. In 2008, Sheldon was accused of running a joint employer–union training fund. A review by professional services firm Deloitte noted a lack of governance arrangements in the operation of the fund, which should have been in place to ensure its formal separation from the TWU. In December 2011 he restructured elements of the TWU's national office, with a stated view to position the TWU for the future, but the move received some criticism from rival unions and disgruntled former members of staff.

As TWU National Secretary, Sheldon led the widely praised TWU 'Safe Rates' campaign, where his negotiation skills and leadership of the TWU's campaigning were instrumental in garnering community and political support for the Road Safety Remuneration Act 2012, landmark legislation which is aimed at improving safety and conditions in the road transport industry. In October 2015, he led a delegation to the International Labour Organization lobbying for a plan based on the Australian Safe Rates model to tackle unfair and unsafe remuneration as the root cause of the high global death toll in trucking.

In May 2012 Sheldon was named one of the most powerful union leaders in Australia by the Power Index. In 2014 he was elected chairperson of the International Transport Workers' Federation Road Transport Sector. He resigned from the TWU in August 2018 following his preselection for the Senate.

Sheldon also served as vice president of the Australian Council of Trade Unions, a member of the Australian Labor Party (New South Wales Branch) administrative committee, as a board member to TWU Super and is a former senior vice president of the Australian Labor Party.

== Politics ==
Sheldon won ALP preselection for the Senate in June 2018, with the endorsement of the Centre Unity (Labor Right) faction. The Sydney Morning Herald described him as a "strong backer of Labor leader Bill Shorten" and speculated he would be elevated to the ministry if the party won government. He was married to member of the New South Wales Legislative Council Sarah Kaine. He was elected to the Senate at the 2019 federal election to a six-year term beginning on 1 July 2019.

Following the election of the Labor Government, on 24 July 2022, Sheldon was appointed Special Envoy for Disaster Recovery by Prime Minister Anthony Albanese.

On 2 August 2022, Sheldon was elected Chair of the Senate Education and Employment Legislation Committee. He also serves as Deputy Chair of the Senate Select Committee on Australia's Disaster Resilience.
