= Susan Carter =

Australian politician

Susan Carter MLC

Member of the New South Wales Legislative Council
- Incumbent
- Assumed office 25 March 2023

Personal details
- Party: Liberal
- Education: University of Sydney
- Occupation: Politician

Susan Carter is an Australian politician. She was elected to New South Wales Legislative Council in 2023 as a member of the Liberal Party.
