= Stephen Lawrence (politician) =

Australian politician

Member of the New South Wales Legislative Council
- Incumbent
- Assumed office 25 March 2023

Mayor of Dubbo
- In office 3 June 2021 – 23 December 2021
- Preceded by: Ben Shields
- Succeeded by: Mathew Dickerson

Deputy Mayor of Dubbo
- In office 2019–2021
- Succeeded by: Anne Jones

Councillor of the Dubbo Regional Council for Dubbo East Eard
- In office 9 September 2017 – 4 December 2021

Personal details
- Born: c. 1975
- Party: Labor
- Education: Australian National University
- Occupation: Barrister
- Website: www.nswlabor.org.au/stephen_lawrence

Stephen Lawrence is an Australian barrister and politician who is currently serving as a member of the New South Wales Legislative Council for the Labor Party He previously served as the mayor of the Dubbo Regional Council. He also co-hosts Australian legal podcast "The Wigs", with Jim Minns, Emmanuel Kerkysharian and Felicity Graham.

== Early life ==
Lawrence was born in Griffith, New South Wales in 1975 to a family of five children. He attended St Joseph's College, Hunters Hill for years 11 and 12 and received a Bachelor of Arts from the University of Sydney and a Bachelor of Laws and Master of Laws from the Australian National University.

== Career ==
=== Legal ===
Lawrence has been a lawyer since 2001 specialising in criminal and administrative law. He was a specialist family violence and sexual assault prosecutor in Canberra, Australia. He has specialised in transitional justice, having been a public defender in the Solomon Islands as part of the Regional Assistance Mission to Solomon Islands and an Australia Government Justice Advisor in Afghanistan where he assisted in the trials of Taliban detainees. He has also been involved in criminal defence work in Nauru and the Occupied Palestinian Territories.

Lawrence moved to Dubbo in 2010 to work as a solicitor at the Aboriginal Legal Service, where he appeared in Bugmy v The Queen [2013] HCA 37, a significant case on sentencing socially disadvantaged Aboriginal offenders.

Lawrence worked as a barrister from 2015 until he was elected to the NSW parliament in 2023.

He was involved in a range of high profile cases as a barrister including Alexander v Minister for Home Affairs [2022] HCA 19 in which the High Court struck down federal citizenship stripping laws and Raul Bassi v Commissioner of Police (NSW) [2020] NSWCA 109 in which the NSW Court of Appeal authorised a large Black Lives Matter protest minutes before it was due to commence. He was also one of a team of Australian lawyers who appeared in the long running Nauru 19 litigation in Nauru.

=== Politics ===
Lawrence first joined the Labor Party at the age of eighteen and is a member of the United Services Union.

He was endorsed as the Labor candidate for the state seat of Dubbo at the 2015 election and again at the 2019 election.

He was elected to Dubbo Regional Council in 2017, the first endorsed Labor candidate to be elected to local government in Dubbo. He was elected as Deputy Mayor in 2019 and Mayor in 2021.

In 2019 he was elected as the Vice President (Rural and Regional) of Local Government NSW, a peak body for local government in NSW.

He retired from local government at the December 2021 election (which saw three Labor candidates elected in Dubbo wards) and was later endorsed as a Labor candidate for the Legislative Council at the 2023 state election, where he was elected.

In October 2023, Lawrence signed an open letter in which he and other parliamentarians stated their solidarity with Palestine and the Palestinian Australian community and condemned attacks against Israeli and Palestinian civilians during the Gaza war. In August 2025, Lawrence attended the March for Humanity in Sydney, a large protest highlighting the plight of Palestinians in the Gaza conflict.

Civic offices
Preceded by Ben Shields	Mayor of Dubbo; 2021 – 2021	Succeeded by Mathew Dickerson
