= Emily Suvaal =

Australian trade unionist and politician

The Honourable Emily Suvaal MLC
- Suvaal in 2025

Parliamentary Secretary for Trade and Small Business
- Incumbent
- Assumed office 17 March 2025
- Premier: Chris Minns

Member of the New South Wales Legislative Council
- Incumbent
- Assumed office 25 March 2023

Junior Vice President of the New South Wales Labor Party
- Incumbent
- Assumed office 28 July 2024
- President: Dr Tricia Kavanagh

Personal details
- Party: NSW Labor
- Spouse: Jay
- Children: 2
- Occupation: Registered Nurse

Emily Suvaal is an Australian politician and former nurse and trade unionist. She was elected as a Member of the New South Wales Legislative Council at the 2023 state election.

== Career ==
Suvaal is a registered nurse, and in 2021 indicated her intention to run for Labor preselection in the division of Hunter with the impending retirement of Joel Fitzgibbon. Olympic shooter Daniel Repacholi was ultimately preselected. In 2022, Suvaal was endorsed as a NSW Labor candidate for the Legislative Council at the 2023 state election.

Suvaal was sworn in as Parliamentary Secretary for Trade and Small Business on 17 March 2025.

== Personal life ==
Suvaal resides in Cessnock with her husband Jay.

Suvaal is passionate about improving community mental health services after her own experience of anorexia from teenage years to young adulthood.
