= Jacqui Munro =

Australian politician

The Honourable Jacqueline Munro MLC
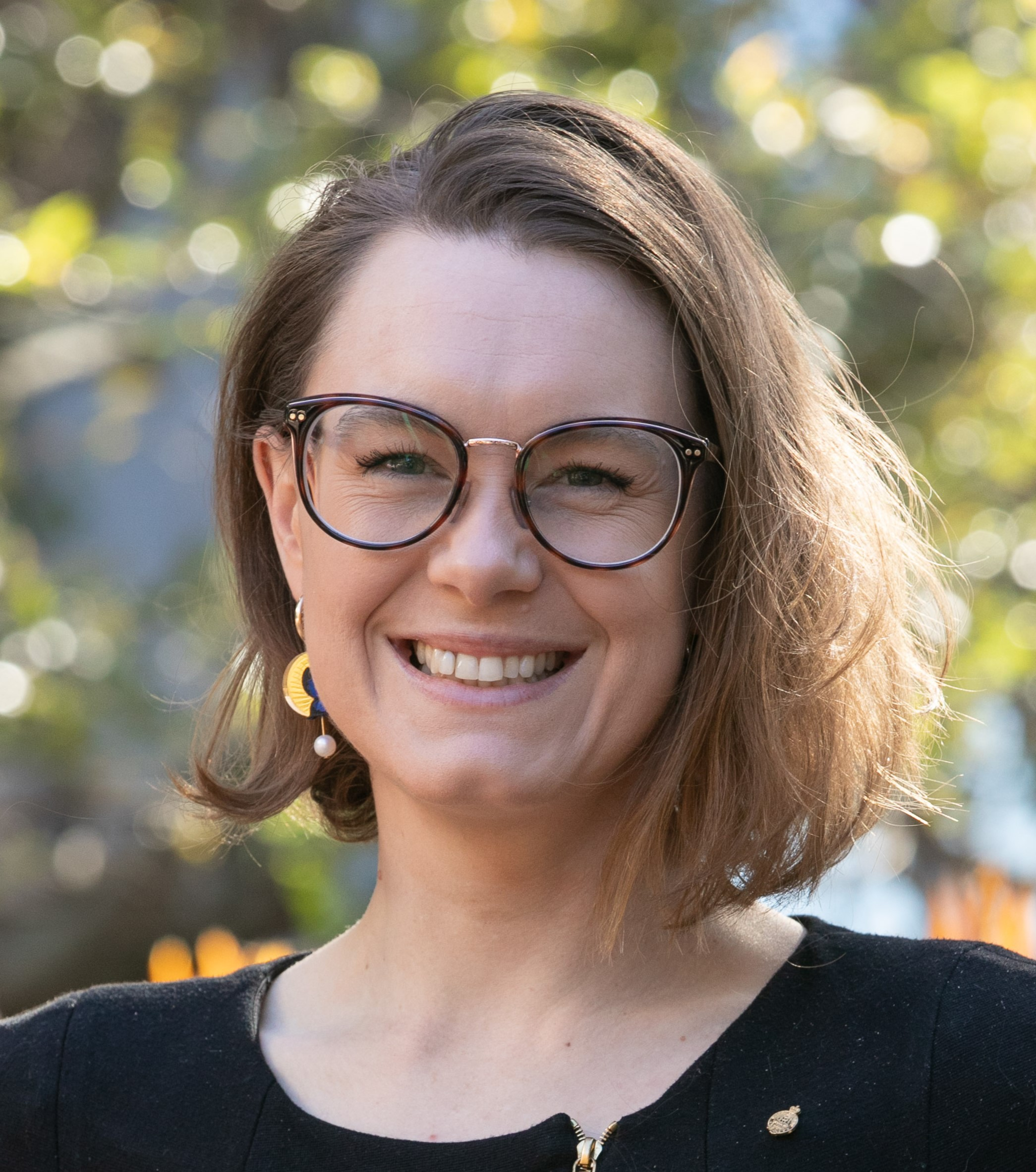

Member of the New South Wales Legislative Council
- Incumbent
- Assumed office 20 April 2023

Personal details
- Party: NSW Liberal
- Occupation: Politician
- Website: www.jacquimunro.com

Jacqueline (Jacqui) Munro is an Australian politician who is a member of the New South Wales Liberal Party. She was elected as a Member of the New South Wales Legislative Council at the 2023 state election.

Munro is the youngest Liberal woman to ever be elected to the Legislative Council, as well as the first LGBT woman to be elected to the Parliament of New South Wales as a member of the Liberal Party.

== Career ==
Munro worked as a staffer at all levels of Government including for former NSW premier Gladys Berejiklian, Malcolm Turnbull and City of Sydney councillor Kerryn Phelps.

Munro worked for Berejiklian as a policy advisor until she was identified supporting the Keep Sydney Open movement. She was a media adviser to the Marriage Equality campaign at the 2017 Australian Marriage Law Postal Survey. Prior to her election, she was the Female Vice-President of the NSW Liberal Party and its Women's Council President. Munro also worked as a public affairs director at a global public relations and communications agency.

=== Political candidate ===
At the 2019 Australian federal election, Munro was the Liberal candidate for the federal electorate of Sydney. She was the NSW Liberal Party's youngest woman candidate and was unsuccessful. She was elected as a Member of the New South Wales Legislative Council at the 2023 state election. Munro's preselection for the Legislative Council was controversial: she prevailed by a single vote.

== Personal life ==
Munro holds a Bachelor of International Studies from the University of Sydney. She is also marathon-runner and a media commentator.
