= Scott Barrett (politician) =

Australian politician

The Honourable Scott Barrett

Member of the New South Wales Legislative Council
- Incumbent
- Assumed office 19 September 2024
- Preceded by: Bronnie Taylor
- In office 24 February 2022 – 3 March 2023
- Preceded by: Trevor Khan

Personal details
- Party: The Nationals
- Spouse: Maryanne Hawthorn
- Education: Hawkesbury Agricultural College
- Occupation: Journalist

Scott James Barrett is an Australian politician. He was appointed to the New South Wales Legislative Council on 24 February 2022 to fill the casual vacancy caused by the resignation of Trevor Khan. He is a member of the National Party.

== Early life and career ==
Barrett was born and raised in the Central West region, and attended Sydney Church of England Grammar School. He then attended Hawkesbury Agricultural College where he completed a Bachelor Systems Agriculture and served as President of the Hawkesbury Student Union.

Barrett then worked as a presenter and reporter with ABC Radio in north-west Queensland and then served as a media adviser for federal Katter's Australia Party MP Bob Katter between 2008 and 2010. He then joined the National Party and worked as a party campaign manager in the Division of Hunter at the 2013 federal election, and as a regional co-ordinator for the party in 2014. He then worked as a policy adviser for the Baird government.

Barrett was also a charity manager and had worked overseas for charities. He was the NSW state manager for charity group GIVIT, which provided drought, flood and bushfire relief.

== Political career ==
Barrett ran for the National Party in the Orange by-election in 2016 but was not elected.

Following the resignation of Trevor Khan in January 2022, Barrett was selected by the National Party to fill the casual vacancy caused by Khan's resignation. He was appointed by a joint sitting of the New South Wales parliament on 24 February 2022. In March 2022, Barrett was appointed as Deputy Government Whip in the Legislative Council, serving in the role until his defeat at the 2023 election.

In September 2024 Barrett was appointed to the Legislative Council to fill the casual vacancy left by Bronnie Taylor.
