= Sue Higginson =

Australian politician

Sue Higginson MLC
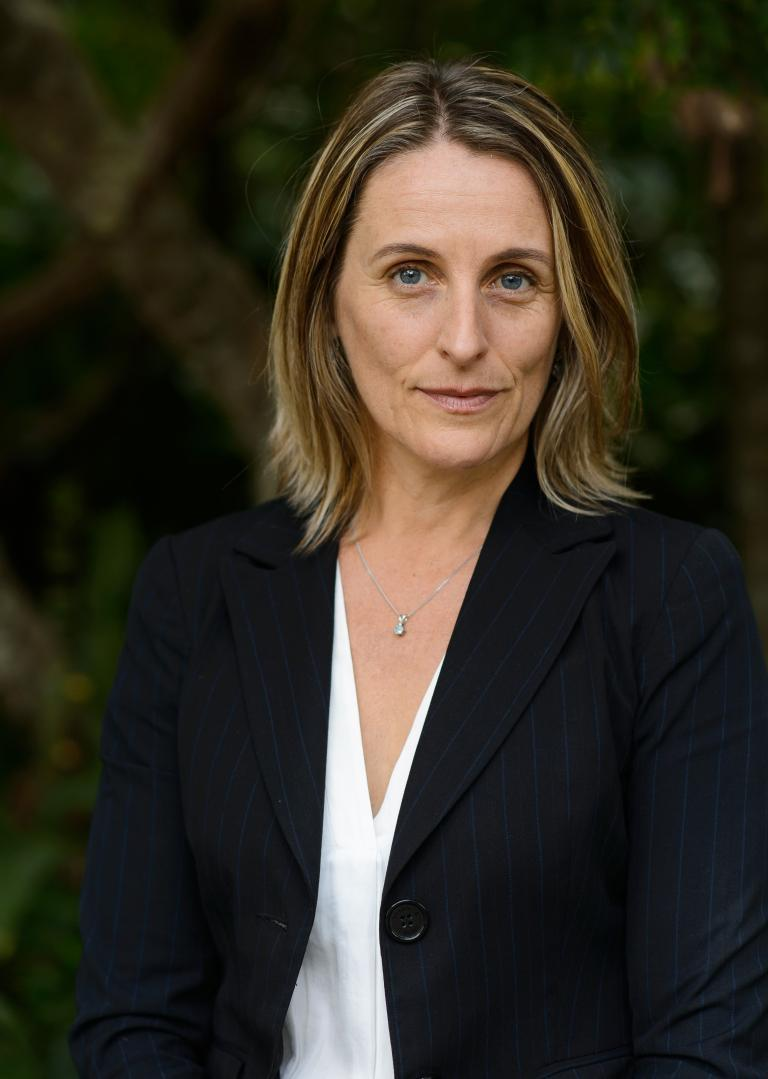
- Higginson in 2022

Member of the New South Wales Legislative Council
- Incumbent
- Assumed office 12 May 2022
- Preceded by: David Shoebridge

Personal details
- Born: Cornwall, England, UK
- Party: The Greens NSW
- Education: Southern Cross University (LLB)
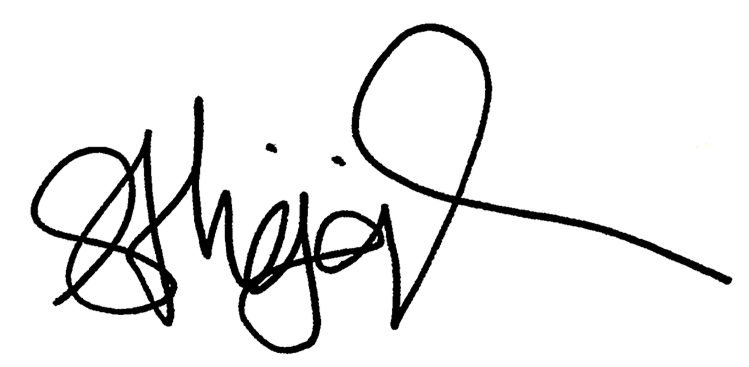
- Signature
- Website: www.suehigginson.org

Susan Higginson is an Australian politician and a former public interest environmental lawyer. She has been a Greens member of the New South Wales Legislative Council since 12 May 2022, when she filled a casual vacancy caused by the resignation of David Shoebridge.

== Early life ==
Higgson was born in Cornwall, England. At age two, she moved with her family to Preston. In the early 1980's, when Higginson was around ten years old, the family moved to Melbourne, Australia.

== Background ==
Higginson graduated from Southern Cross University with Bachelor of Laws, with First Class Honours and was awarded the University Medal upon graduation. She then practiced as a public interest environmental lawyer, and was a Principal Solicitor and CEO of the Environmental Defenders Office. She has also lectured and taught environmental law in universities across the state.

== Political career ==
Higginson was the Greens' candidate for the seat of Lismore in the 2019 NSW election. She obtained 24% of first preference votes, and only missed being in the last two candidates in the distribution of preferences by 361 votes. In February 2022, Higginson was chosen by The Greens to fill the upcoming vacancy for David Shoebridge, who would be resigning from the New South Wales Legislative Council to contest the May federal election. Shoebridge resigned in April 2022, and Higginson was appointed as a member of the Legislative Council on 12 May 2022.

On 24 December 2025, the New South Wales Parliament adopted Higginson's amendment to its new firearms laws ensuring that the police commissioner would not grant a firearms license to anyone being investigated by federal or state authorities, or individuals associated with members of proscribed organisations including anyone living in the same dwelling as someone being investigated for terrorism-related offenses. These new firearms laws were passed in response to the 2025 Bondi Beach shooting on 15 December.

== Personal life ==
Higginson and her partner have a farm on the Richmond Floodplain in the Northern Rivers.
