= John Ruddick =

Australian politician

The Honourable John Ruddick MLC
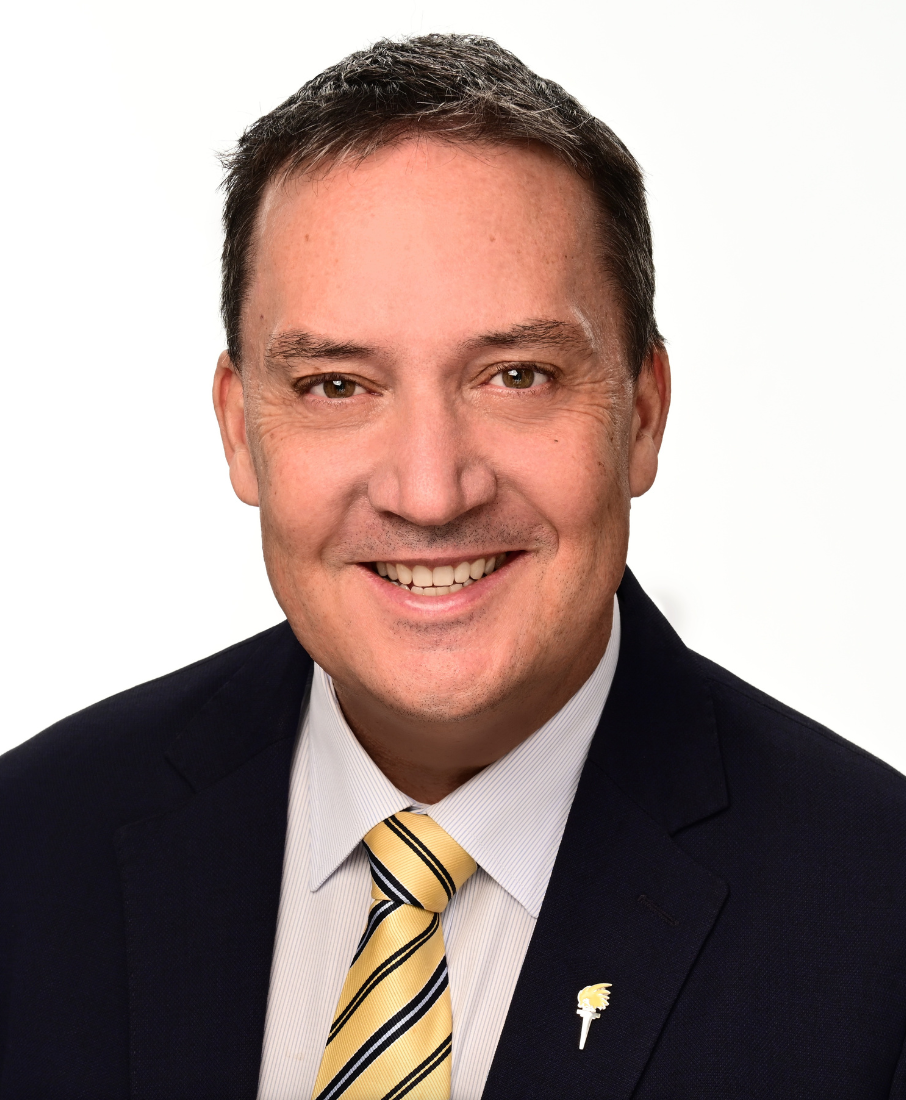

Member of the New South Wales Legislative Council
- Incumbent
- Assumed office 20 April 2023

Personal details
- Born: John Raymond Nettleton Ruddick
- Party: Libertarian (since 2021)
- Other political affiliations: Liberal (1994–2015)
- Spouse: Kelly Ruddick
- Children: Mortgage broker; Politician

John Raymond Nettleton Ruddick is an Australian politician. He has been a Libertarian member of the New South Wales Legislative Council since 20 April 2023, and is the first member of the NSW Libertarian Party to be elected to the NSW Parliament. Before joining the NSW Libertarian Party, Ruddick was a member of the Liberal Party.

== Career ==
=== Liberal Party ===
Ruddick was a member of the Liberal Party for over twenty-five years. He worked as a member of staff to former Federal Member for Parramatta, Ross Cameron and served as a member of the NSW Liberal Party state executive.

In 2011, Ruddick first contested the presidency of the NSW Liberal Party on a platform of democratisation. He unsuccessfully contested the presidency again the following year, increasing his vote to 40%.

In 2013, he appeared on 7.30, calling for further restrictions on lobbyists holding positions in the Liberal Party. For this, he faced suspension from the party for between two and five years. He was subsequently suspended for the full five years.

In 2017, while a member of the Liberal Party, Ruddick threatened to join the Cory Bernardi-led Australian Conservatives if the 'Warringah Motion' for plebiscites to determine preselections was not carried.

In 2020, Ruddick started JR Mortgages, a mortgage broker house in Sydney. He is listed as the company's director.

=== Libertarian Party ===
Ruddick left the Liberal Party to join the Liberal Democrats (renamed in 2024 to the Libertarian Party) in 2021, following public dissatisfaction with the Liberals' response to COVID-19, lockdowns and what he alleged to be a lack of democratisation in the party. He initially announced he would contest the electorate of Warringah at the 2022 federal election, but instead unsuccessfully contested the Senate.

Ruddick was the lead candidate on the LDP's Legislative Council ticket at the 2023 New South Wales state election. In late 2022, the Liberal Democrats NSW state executive voted to disendorse Ruddick as its lead MLC candidate for the NSW state election following allegations of bullying and harassment of campaign staff, allegations which Ruddick denied. After a petition calling for a special general meeting over the matter was signed by over 25% of the party's 320 members, Ruddick was re-endorsed.

The party received 3.53% of the primary vote in the upper house ballot, a swing of +1.3%, a quota of 0.7755. As the lead candidate, Ruddick was declared elected on 20 April 2023. He is the first member of the party to be elected to the NSW Parliament. His term will expire on 7 March 2031.

In March 2025, Ruddick opposed a proposed amendment to the Abortion Law Reform Act 2019 that would mean the majority of hospitals in NSW would be required to provide abortion-related services.

Ruddick participated in the 2025 Sydney Harbour Bridge protest.

Ruddick expressed his support for the 2025 March for Australia. He also supports a five-year immigration pause; he does not support remigration.

In October 2025, Ruddick introduced a Bill for an Act to prohibit the performance of terminations for the purposes of sex selection. The Bill was defeated in the Legislative Council by 21 to 16 votes.

In November 2025, Ruddick is the president of the Digital Freedom Project who announced it would commence legal action in the High Court against the new Social media age ban laws, saying they violate the implied right to political communication in the Constitution.
