= Bob Nanva =

Australian politician

The Honourable Bob Nanva MLC

Government Whip in the New South Wales Legislative Council
- Incumbent
- Assumed office 3 May 2023
- Deputy: Cameron Murphy
- Preceded by: Shayne Mallard

Member of the New South Wales Legislative Council
- Incumbent
- Assumed office 25 March 2023

General Secretary of the New South Wales Labor Party
- In office 2019 – 28 April 2023
- Deputy: Dominic Offner
- Leader: Jodi McKay; Chris Minns
- Preceded by: Kaila Murnain
- Succeeded by: Dominic Offner

National Secretary of the Rail Tram and Bus Union
- In office 2011–2019
- Succeeded by: Mark Diamond

Personal details
- Party: NSW Labor
- Education: Macquarie University
- Occupation: Trade unionist

Bob Nanva is an Australian trade unionist and politician who is currently serving as a Member of the New South Wales Legislative Council.

He previously served as National Secretary of the Rail Tram and Bus Union and as General Secretary of NSW Labor.

== Education ==
Nanva holds a Bachelor of Business Administration (Honours) and a Bachelor of Laws (Honours) from Macquarie University.

== Career ==
=== National Secretary of the RTBU ===
In 2011, he was appointed National Secretary of the Rail Tram and Bus Union (RTBU). He also served on the board of the Transport and Logistics Industry Skills Council. Following criminal charges being laid against CFMEU officials John Setka and John Reardon, Nanva said that Australia's industrial relations conflict had "become an exercise in mutually-assured destruction". In 2015, Nanva criticised the inaugural speech of Labor MP Chris Minns, which called for reduced union influence within the party. In 2016, he was also elected as Vice President of the Australian Council of Trade Unions (ACTU). In 2017, Nanva criticised the resignation of Fair Work Commission vice-president Graeme Watson, calling for new limits on the employment activities of commissioners who resigned from the organisation. In 2019, Nanva resigned as RTBU National Secretary and ceased to be Vice President of the ACTU.

=== Labor Party ===
Nanva is a member of the Mulock Nepean Branch of the NSW Labor Party and served as a local councillor on Burwood City Council. He has been a policy advisor to both State and Federal Labor Governments. In 2019, he was appointed as General-Secretary of NSW Labor and served on the party's Administrative Committee and National Executive.

Nanva was endorsed as a Labor candidate for the New South Wales Legislative Council in the 2023 election and was elected.
