= Chris Rath =

Australian politician (born 1989)

The Honourable Chris Rath MLC
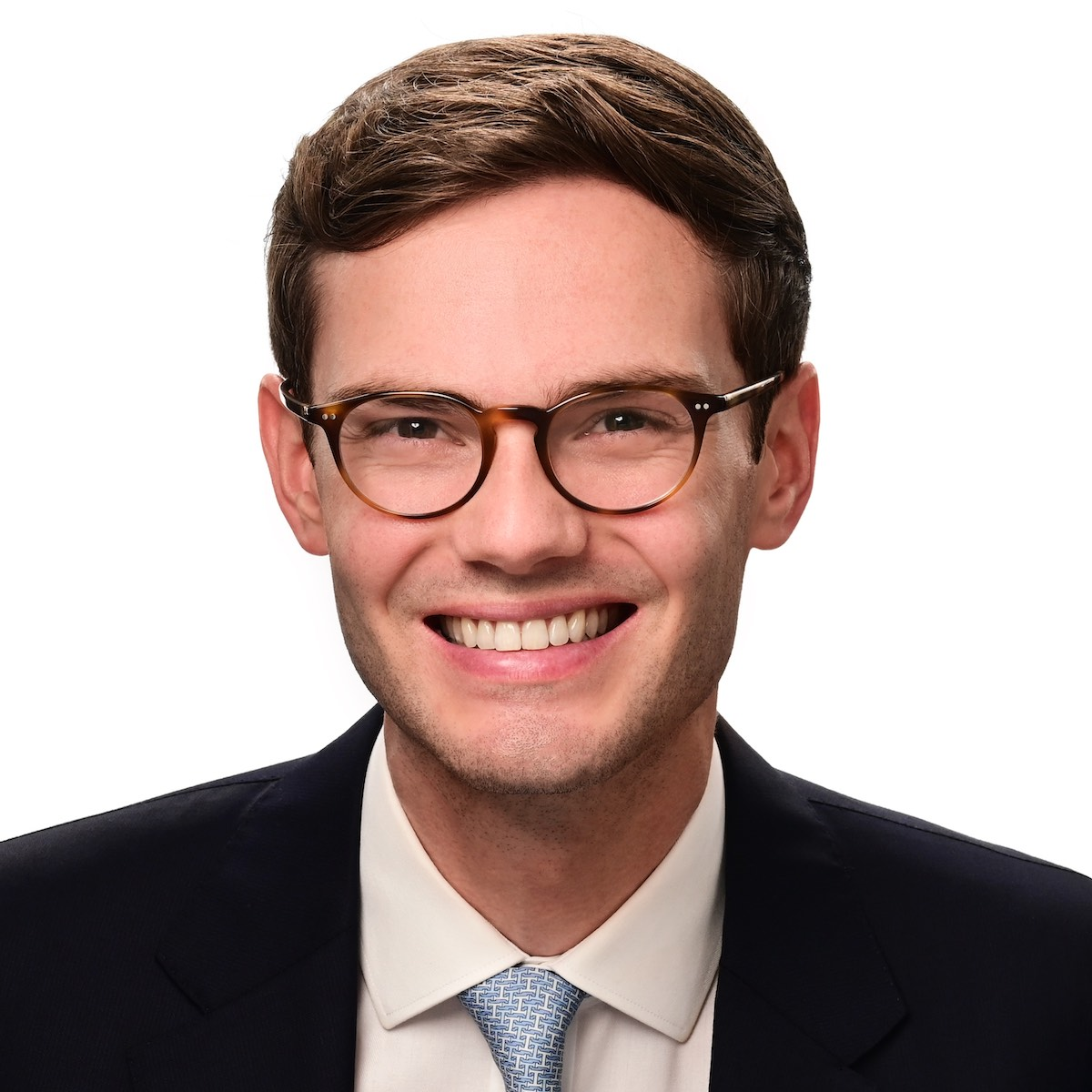
- Rath in 2022

Opposition Whip in the New South Wales Legislative Council
- Incumbent
- Assumed office 21 April 2023

Shadow Minister for Planning and Public Spaces
- Incumbent
- Assumed office 6 January 2026

Shadow Minister for Housing
- Incumbent
- Assumed office 6 January 2026

Shadow Minister for Cities
- Incumbent
- Assumed office 6 January 2026

Shadow Minister for the Arts
- Incumbent
- Assumed office 6 January 2026

Shadow Minister for the Illawarra and South Coast
- Incumbent
- Assumed office 6 January 2026

Member of the New South Wales Legislative Council
- Incumbent
- Assumed office 24 March 2022
- Preceded by: Don Harwin

Personal details
- Born: April 1989 (age 37) Wollongong, New South Wales, Australia
- Party: Liberal Party of Australia
- Spouse: Patrick Wynne (m. 2025)
- Education: University of Sydney

Christopher Dennis Rath is an Australian politician who currently serves as the Opposition Whip in the New South Wales Legislative Council.

He was appointed to the Legislative Council on 24 March 2022 to fill the casual vacancy caused by the resignation of Don Harwin. He was successful in contesting a further eight-year term in the 2023 New South Wales state election, then also being elected as the Opposition Whip in the Legislative Council on 21 April 2023. Rath is a member of the Liberal Party. In 2024, Rath was appointed Shadow Special Minister of State and in 2025 was appointed as Shadow Minister for Local Government in Mark Speakman's Shadow Ministry.

He is one of the two openly LGBTI Liberal Party members of the NSW Parliament, as of 2023. In his role as a Member of the Legislative Council, he has advocated for free market principles, liberal industrial relations reform and structural changes to taxation.

== Early life ==
Rath was born in Wollongong in 1989. He attended the NSW Youth Parliament program in 2005, and joined the NSW Young Liberals in 2006. He attended Edmund Rice College in Wollongong and graduated in 2007. He later attended the University of Sydney, graduating with a Bachelor of Economics and a Master of Management. Between 2015 and 2022, he was a Government Relations Manager for Insurance Australia Group (IAG).

Rath's political philosophy is known to be a blend of classical liberalism and conservatism, following in the tradition of John Stuart Mill, John Locke, Edmund Burke and Adam Smith.

== Political career ==
Rath joined the Young Liberals in 2006 in Wollongong. While attending the University of Sydney, he co-founded the University of Sydney Conservative Club. Since then, he served in a number of roles within the NSW Division of the Liberal Party of Australia, including as a member of its state executive from 2015 to 2022 and as the Urban Vice-President from 2019 to 2022.

Rath joined the NSW Young Liberals in 2006, and was president of the Thornsby Young Liberals from 2007 to 2018. In 2010, while attending the University of Sydney, he co-founded the University of Sydney Conservative Club. He was part of the NSW Young Liberal Executive in 2011 and 2012, and part of the Federal Young Liberal Movement Executive in 2012. He has been a NSW Liberal State Council Delegate since 2008, and part of the NSW Liberal Party State Executive from 2015 to 2022, and served as Urban Vice-President from 2019 to 2022, when he was appointed to the New South Wales Legislative Council in the balance of the term of Don Harwin. He was returned to the New South Wales Legislative Council at the 2023 Election.

Following his appointment to the New South Wales Legislative Council, Rath was tasked with holding the unions accountable for partisan political campaigning. He was instrumental in forcing the resignation of Rail Tram and Bus Union (RTBU) (NSW Branch) Secretary Alex Claassens from Labor's Administrative Committee after campaigning to demonstrate Claassens' conflict of interest between the two roles.

He was also a member of the Inquiry into Allegations of Impropriety Against Agents of the City of Canterbury Bankstown Council, which forced the withdrawal of Labor City of Canterbury-Bankstown Mayor Khal Asfour from his candidature for the Legislative Council in the 2023 state election.

During the 57th parliament, Rath served as the Chair of the Law and Justice Committee, also becoming the Temporary Chair of Committees.

== Personal life ==
Rath married Patrick Wynne in July 2025. Wynne is a former staffer to NSW Liberal leader Mark Speakman and currently works at TransGrid.
