= New South Wales Legislative Council =

Upper house of the Parliament of New South Wales

Legislative Council
- 58th Parliament

Type
- Type: Upper house of the Parliament of New South Wales

History
- Founded: 25 August 1824; 202 years ago

Leadership
- President: Ben Franklin, Nationals since 9 May 2023
- Deputy President and Chair of Committees: Rod Roberts, Independent since 9 May 2023
- Leader of the Government: Penny Sharpe, Labor since 28 March 2023
- Deputy Leader of the Government: John Graham, Labor since 28 March 2023
- Leader of the Opposition: Damien Tudehope, Liberal since 28 March 2023
- Government Whip: Bob Nanva, Labor since 3 May 2023
- Deputy Government Whip: Cameron Murphy, Labor since 21 April 2023
- Opposition Whip: Chris Rath, Liberal since 21 April 2023

Structure
- Seats: 42
- Political groups: Government (15); Labor (15) Opposition (14); Liberal (9); National (5) Crossbench (13); Greens (4); Shooters, Fishers, Farmers (2) (Note: Robert Borsak and Mark Banasiak); Animal Justice (1); Legalise Cannabis (1); Libertarian (1) Independent (4) (Note: Mark Latham, Taylor Martin, Tania Mihailuk and Rod Roberts)
- Length of term: 8 years

Elections
- Voting system: Single transferable vote
- Last election: 25 March 2023
- Next election: 13 March 2027

Meeting place
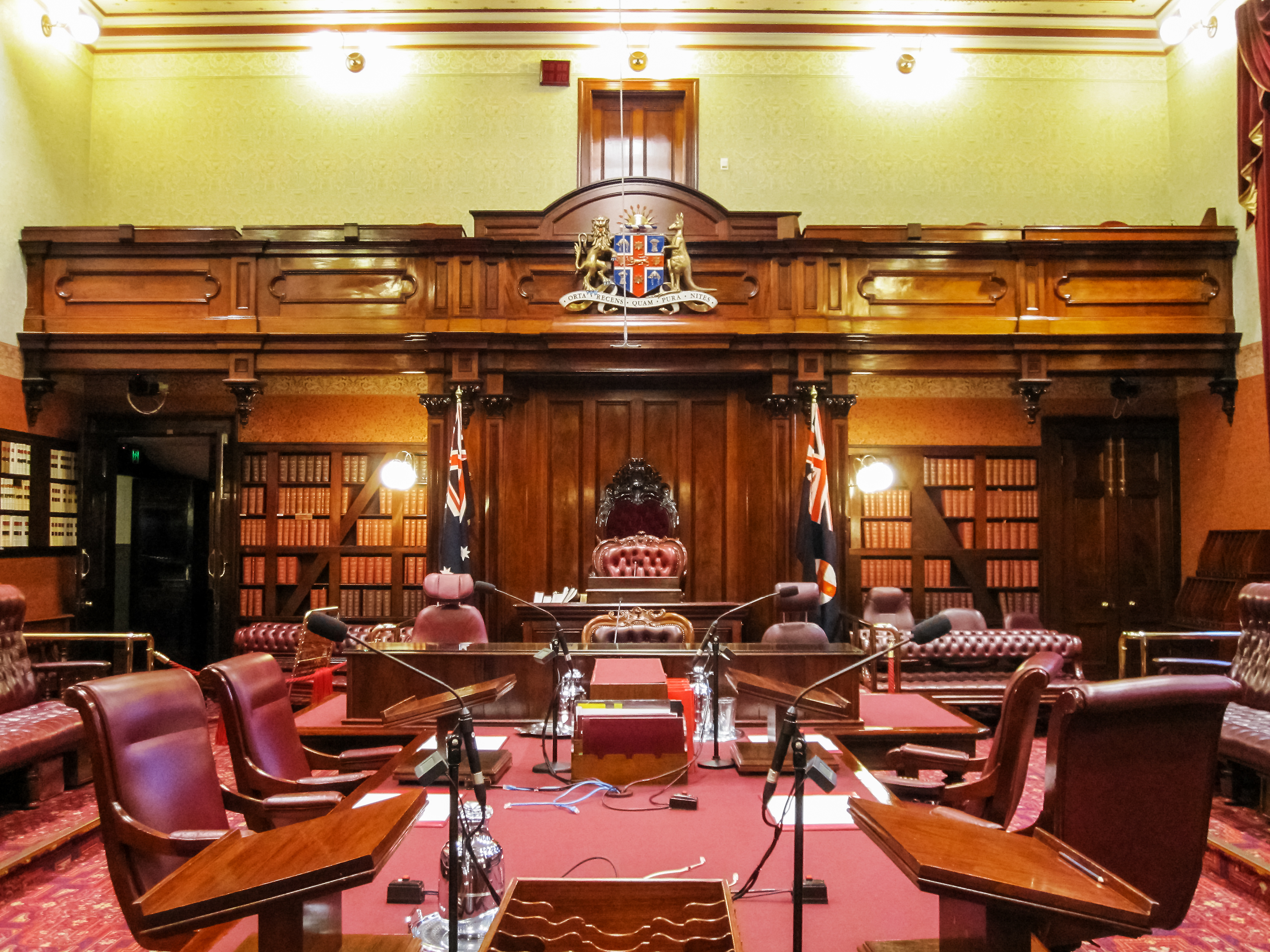
- Legislative Council Chamber; Parliament House, Sydney, New South Wales, Australia

Website
- NSW Legislative Council

The New South Wales Legislative Council, often referred to as the upper house, is one of the two chambers of the parliament of the Australian state of New South Wales. Along with the Legislative Assembly, it sits at Parliament House in the state capital, Sydney. It is normal for legislation to be first deliberated on and passed by the Legislative Assembly before being considered by the Legislative Council, which acts in the main as a house of review.

The Legislative Council has 42 members, elected by proportional representation in which the whole state is a single electorate. Members serve eight-year terms, which are staggered, with half the Council being elected every four years, roughly coinciding with elections to the Legislative Assembly.

== History ==
The parliament of New South Wales is Australia's oldest legislature. It had its beginnings when New South Wales was a British colony under the control of the Governor, and was first established by the New South Wales Act 1823 (4 Geo. 4. c. 96 (Imp)). A small, five-member appointed Legislative Council began meeting on 25 August 1824 to advise the governor on legislative matters. By 1825 it had grown to seven members, and between ten and fifteen in 1829. Under the Electoral Act 1843, the Legislative Council was expanded to 36 members, of whom 12 were appointed by the Governor in the name of the Crown, and the remainder elected from among eligible landholders. This change partly incorporated William Wentworth's ideals of self government proposed through the Australian Patriotic Association. Following the passage into law of the Electoral Act 1851, the council was enlarged to 54 members with 36 of its members elected by adult males who met certain property requirements and 18 appointed members.

In 1856, under a new constitution, the Parliament became bicameral with a fully elected Legislative Assembly and a fully appointed Legislative Council with a government taking over most of the legislative powers of the governor. The right to vote was extended to all adult males in 1858.

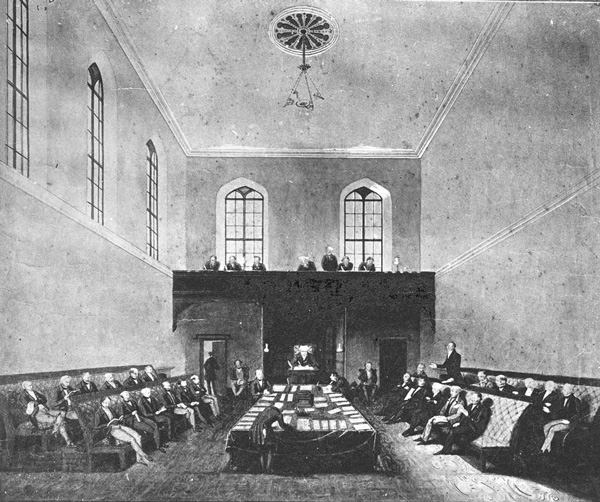
First meeting of the NSW Legislative Council in Parliament House, 1843 (chamber now the Legislative Assembly).

On 22 May 1856, the newly constituted New South Wales Parliament opened and sat for the first time. With the new 54-member Legislative Assembly taking over the council chamber, a second meeting chamber for the 21-member upper house had to be added to the Parliament building in Macquarie Street. In 1901, New South Wales became a state of the Commonwealth of Australia and many government functions were transferred to the new Commonwealth government. In 1902, women gained the right to vote and the current Constitution of New South Wales was adopted, and in 1918, reforms permitted women to be members of parliament.

In 1925, 1926 and 1929, Premier Jack Lang made attempts to abolish the Legislative Council, following the example of the Queensland Legislative Council in 1922, but all were unsuccessful. The debate did, however, result in another round of reforms, and in 1933, the law was changed so that a quarter of the Legislative Council was elected every three years by votes cast by members of the Legislative Assembly and the Legislative Council together, using STV, rather than being appointed by the Governor.

In 1962, Indigenous Australians gained the unfettered right to vote in all state elections, overriding protection orders and other historical restrictions on some Aboriginal people voting.

In 1978, the Council became a directly elected body in a program of electoral reform introduced by the Wran Labor government. The number of members was reduced to 45, with a third elected each third year, although transitional arrangements meant that there were 43 members from 1978 to 1981, and 44 from 1981 to 1984.

Further reform in 1991 by the Greiner Liberal-National government saw the size of the Legislative Council cut to 42 members, with half being elected every 4 years. (In 1991, the NSW Legislative Assembly was reduced from 109 to 99 Members, and then to 93 members in 1999.)

As with the federal parliament and other Australian states and territories, voting in the election to select members for the council is compulsory for all New South Wales citizens over the age of 18. As the result of a 1995 referendum, every four years half the seats in the Council come up for election on the fourth Saturday in March, barring exceptional circumstances.

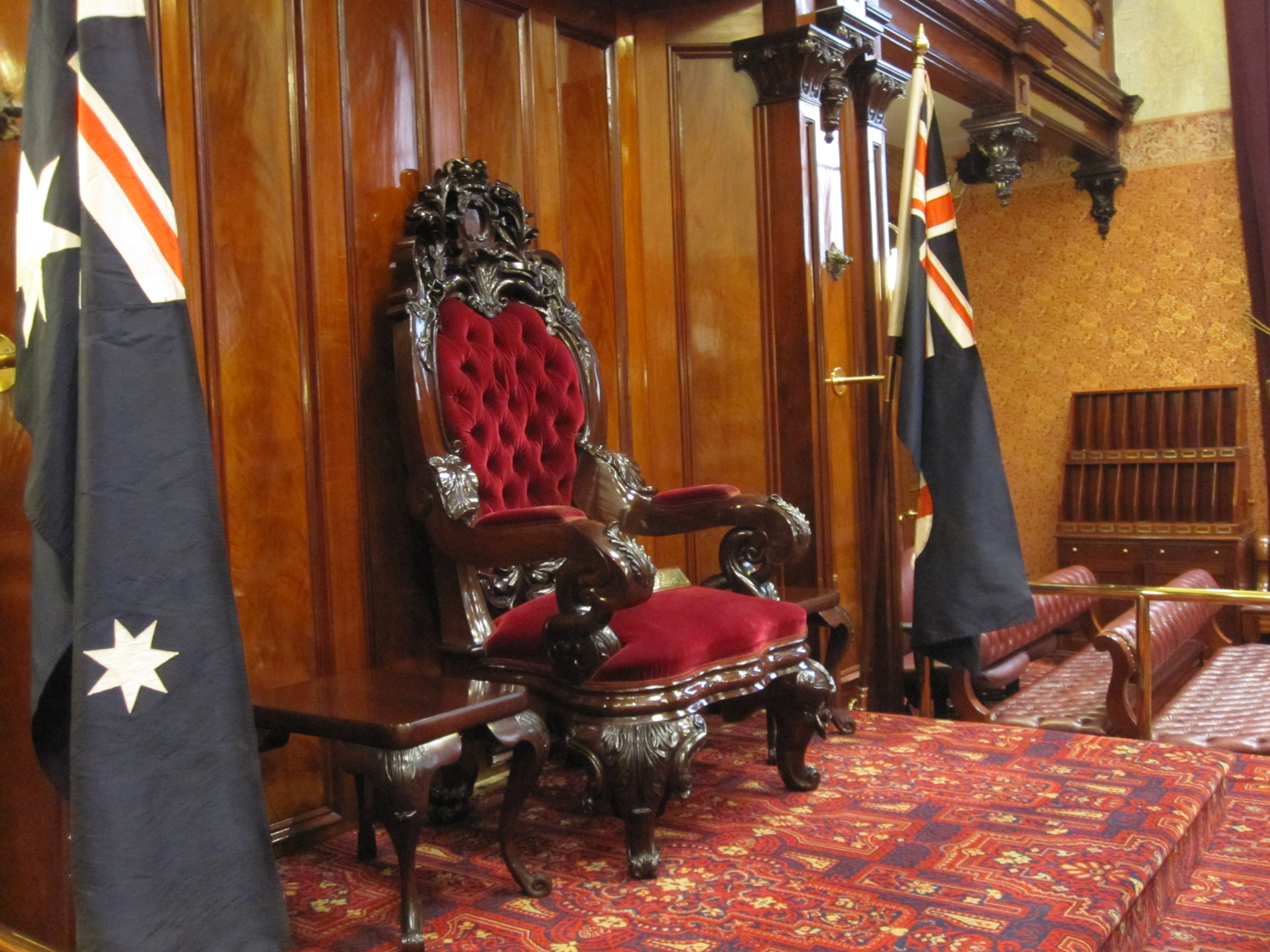
The Governor's Chair in the Legislative Council chamber

=== Opening of parliament ===
The King of Australia has a throne in the Legislative Council. Queen Elizabeth II opened the New South Wales Parliament on two occasions. The first was on 4 February 1954, as part of her first visit to Australia. It was the first time that the monarch of Australia had opened a session of any Australian parliament. The other occasion was on 20 February 1992, during her visit to Sydney to celebrate the sesquicentenary of the incorporation of the City of Sydney, on which occasion she stated:

This is my second opportunity to address this Parliament – a Parliament which I described on the previous occasion, in 1954, as the Mother Parliament of Australia. It is interesting to reflect that that was the first time on which the Sovereign had opened a Session of an Australian Parliament. I was also on my first visit to Australia as your Queen. I have returned to New South Wales eight times since then and am always delighted by the warm and generous hospitality accorded to Prince Philip and me by the people of this State. On this occasion I have come to join in commemorating Sydney's first one hundred and fifty years as a city.

=== Presidency of the Legislative Council ===
From 1846 to 1856 the title of the presiding officer was Speaker of the Legislative Council, and after that date it has been President of the Legislative Council.

== Chamber ==
The Legislative Council chamber is a prefabricated cast-iron building, intended as an "iron store and dwelling with ornamental front", which had been manufactured in Scotland and shipped to Victoria. In 1856, when plans for a new chamber for the Legislative Council were not ready in time, this building was purchased and shipped to Sydney, where it was erected as an extension to Parliament House. The Legislative Council chamber is furnished in red, which follows the British tradition for the upper house.

Since 22 November 2012 the NSW Legislative Council has displayed the Aboriginal Flag in the Chamber.

== Composition and powers ==
Proportional representation, with the whole state as a single electorate, means that the quota for election is small. This almost guarantees the representation of minor parties in the Legislative Council, including micro-parties that might attract less than 2% of the primary vote but are elected through preferences.

In the 1999 elections, a record number of parties contested seats in the council, resulting in an unwieldy ballot paper (referred to as the "table cloth" ballot paper), and a complex exchange of preferences between the numerous parties running candidates. As a result, party registration requirements have since been made more restrictive (e.g., requiring more voters as members, and a larger number of candidates to become eligible for a simple "above-the-line" voting box), and the replacement of party preference arrangements with optional preferential voting. This reduced the number of parties contesting elections and increased the difficulty for small, upstart parties to be elected, so that only five minor parties are now represented in the council, alongside several independent candidates (the Greens; Shooters, Fishers and Farmers; Animal Justice; Legalise Cannabis and Liberal Democrats), along with Labor, Liberal, and National Party members.

== Current distribution of seats (2023–2027) ==
Party	Current Council
Labor	15
Liberal	9
National	5
Greens	4
Independent	4
Shooters, Fishers and Farmers	2
Animal Justice	1
Legalise Cannabis	1
Libertarian	1

The President of the Legislative Council has a casting vote should the result be equal from among those present eligible and choosing to vote. With 42 members, with one removed as president, a majority is 21 of the 41 possible of the whole 42.

Section 22I of the NSW Constitution states that "All questions arising in the Legislative Council shall be decided by a majority of the votes of the Members present other than the President or other Member presiding and when the votes are equal the President or other Member presiding shall have a casting vote."

== See also ==
- 2023 New South Wales state election
- List of New South Wales Legislative Council appointments
- Parliaments of the Australian states and territories
- Women in the New South Wales Legislative Council
- Members of the New South Wales Legislative Council, 1823–1843
