= Psychologist =

Professional who practices psychology

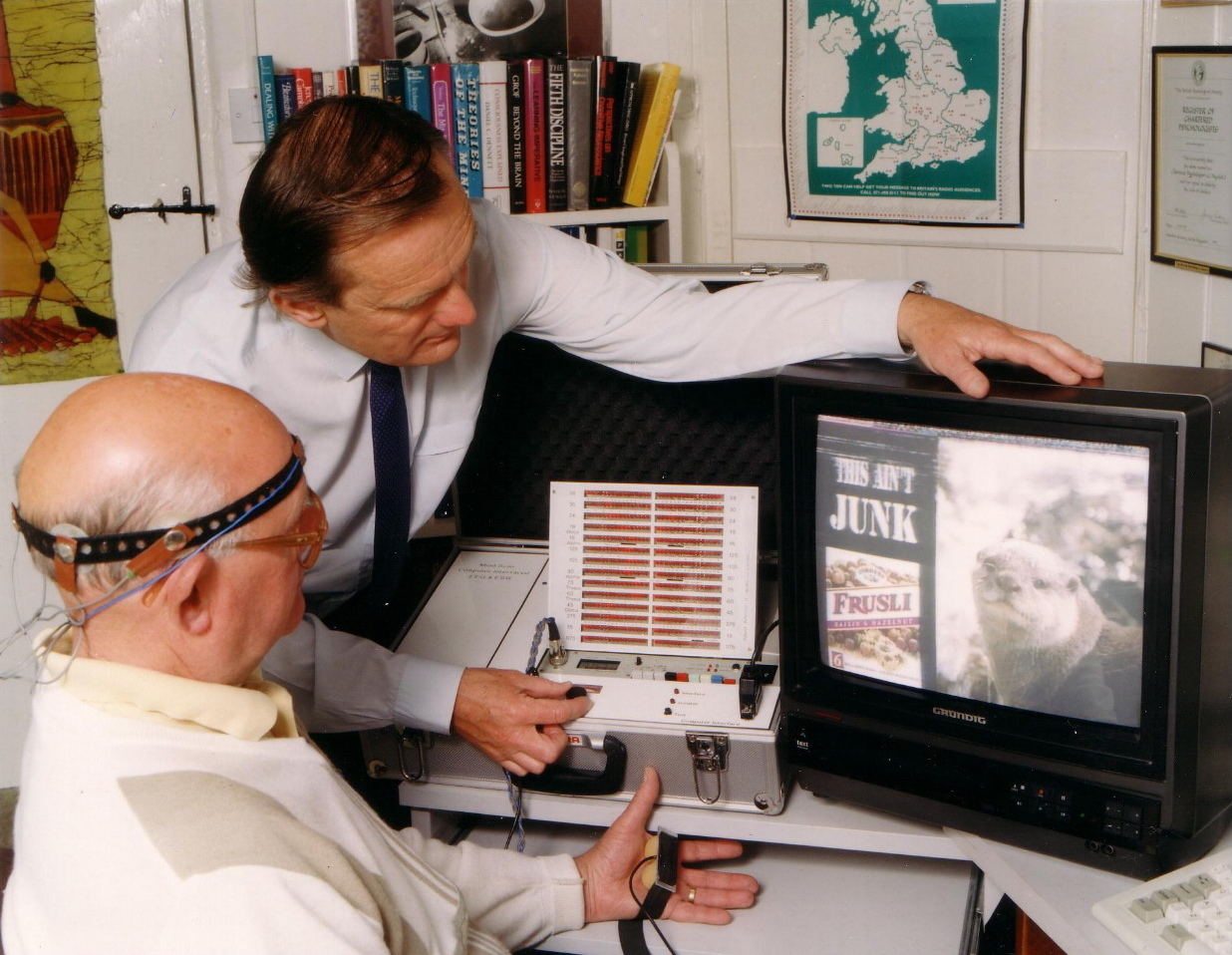

Occupation
- Names: Psychologist

Description
- Competencies: Psychotherapy, psychological assessment and testing, depends on specialty
- Education required: Differs by jurisdiction, typically a terminal degree such as PsyD or PhD
- Fields of employment: Clinical neuropsychology, clinical, Medical, community, counselling, Hospital support, educational and developmental, forensic, health, organisational or sport and exercise
- Related jobs: Psychiatrist; psychotherapist

A psychologist is a professional who practices psychology and studies mental states and perceptual, cognitive, emotional, and social processes and behavior. Their work often involves the experimentation, observation, and interpretation of how individuals relate to each other and to their environments.

Psychologists usually acquire a bachelor's degree in psychology, followed by either a master's or a doctorate in psychology, with requirements varying by country. Unlike psychiatrists and psychiatric nurse-practitioners, psychologists usually cannot prescribe medication, but depending on the jurisdiction, some psychologists with additional training can be licensed to prescribe medications; qualification requirements may be different from a bachelor's degree and master's degree.

Psychologists receive extensive training in psychological testing, communication techniques, scoring, interpretation, and reporting, while psychiatrists are not usually trained in psychological testing. Psychologists are also trained in, and often specialize in, one or more psychotherapies to improve symptoms of many mental disorders, including but not limited to treatment for anxiety, depression, post-traumatic stress disorder, schizophrenia, bipolar disorder, personality disorders and eating disorders. Treatment from psychologists can be individual or in groups. Cognitive behavioral therapy is a commonly used, well studied and high efficacy psychotherapy practiced by psychologists. Psychologists can work with a range of institutions and people, such as schools, prisons, in a private clinic, in a workplace, or with a sports team.

Applied psychology applies theory to solve problems in human and animal behavior. Applied fields include clinical psychology, counseling psychology, sport psychology, forensic psychology, industrial and organizational psychology, community psychology, health psychology and school psychology. Licensing and regulations can vary by state and profession.

== Australia ==
In Australia, the psychology profession, and the use of the title "psychologist", is regulated by an Act of Parliament, the Health Practitioner Regulation (Administrative Arrangements) National Law Act 2008, following an agreement between state and territorial governments. Under this national law, registration of psychologists is administered by the Psychology Board of Australia (PsyBA). Before July 2010, the professional registration of psychologists was governed by various state and territorial Psychology Registration Boards. The Australian Psychology Accreditation Council (APAC) oversees education standards for the profession.

The minimum requirements for general registration in psychology, including the right to use the title "psychologist", are an APAC approved four-year degree in psychology followed by either a two-year master's program or two years of practice supervised by a registered psychologist. However, the Australian Health Practitioner Regulation Agency (AHPRA) is currently in the process of phasing out the 4 + 2 internship pathway. Once the 4 + 2 pathway is phased out, a master's degree or PhD will be required to become a psychologist in Australia. This is because of concerns about public safety, and to reduce the burden of training on employers. There is also a '5 + 1' registration pathway, including a four-year APAC approved degree followed by one year of postgraduate study and one year of supervised practice. Endorsement within a specific area of practice (Note: e.g. clinical neuropsychology, clinical, community, counselling, educational and developmental, forensic, health, organisational or sport and exercise) requires additional qualifications. These notations are not "specialist" titles (Western Australian psychologists could use "specialist" in their titles during a three-year transitional period from 17 October 2010 to 17 October 2013).

Membership with the Australian Psychological Society (APS) differs from registration as a psychologist. The standard route to full membership (MAPS) of the APS usually requires four years of APAC-accredited undergraduate study, plus a master's or doctorate in psychology from an accredited institution. An alternate route is available for academics and practitioners who have gained appropriate experience and made a substantial contribution to the field of psychology.

Restrictions apply to all individuals using the title "psychologist" in all states and territories of Australia. However, the terms "psychotherapist", "social worker", and "counselor" are currently self-regulated, with several organizations campaigning for government regulation. (Note: e.g. Australian Counseling Association and Psychotherapy and Counseling Federation of Australia)

== Belgium ==
Since 1933, the title "psychologist" has been protected by law in Belgium. It can only be used by people who are on the National Government Commission list. The minimum requirement is the completion of five years of university training in psychology (master's degree or equivalent). The title of "psychotherapist" is not legally protected. As of 2016, Belgian law recognizes the clinical psychologist as an autonomous health profession. It reserves the practice of psychotherapy to medical doctors, clinical psychologists and clinical orthopedagogists.

== Canada ==
A professional in the U.S. or Canada must hold a graduate degree in psychology (MA, Psy.D., Ed.D., or Ph.D.), or have a provincial license to use the title "psychologist". Provincial regulators include:

- Alberta: College of Alberta Psychologists
- British Columbia: College of Psychologists of British Columbia
- Manitoba: Psychological Association of Manitoba
- Newfoundland and Labrador: Newfoundland and Labrador Psychology Board
- New Brunswick: College of Psychologists of New Brunswick
- Northwest Territories: Office of the Registrar, Northwest Territories (NWT) Professional Licensing
- Nova Scotia: Nova Scotia Board of Examiners in Psychology
- Nunavut: Registrar, Professional Licensing Kugluktuk
- Ontario: College of Psychologists of Ontario
- Prince Edward Island: Prince Edward Island Psychologists Registration Board
- Quebec: Order of Psychologists of Quebec
- Saskatchewan: Saskatchewan College of Psychologists

== Dominican Republic ==
A professional psychologist in the Dominican Republic must have a suitable qualification and be a member of the Dominican College of Psychologists.

== Finland ==
In Finland, the title "psychologist" is protected by law. The restriction for psychologists (licensed professionals) is governed by National Supervisory Authority for Welfare and Health (Finland) (Valvira). It takes 330 ECTS-credits (about six years) to complete the university studies (master's degree). There are about 6,200 licensed psychologists in Finland.

== Germany ==
In Germany, the use of the title Diplom-Psychologe (Dipl.-Psych.) is restricted by law, and a practitioner is legally required to hold the corresponding academic title, which is comparable to a M.Sc. degree and requires at least five years of training at a university. Originally, a diploma degree in psychology awarded in Germany included the subject of clinical psychology. With the Bologna-reform, this degree was replaced by a master's degree. The academic degree of Diplom-Psychologe or M.Sc. (Psychologie) does not include a psychotherapeutic qualification, which requires three to five years of additional training. The psychotherapeutic training combines in-depth theoretical knowledge with supervised patient care and self-reflection units. After having completed the training requirements, psychologists take a state-run exam, which, upon successful completion (Approbation), confers the official title of "psychological psychotherapist" (Psychologischer Psychotherapeut). After many years of inter-professional political controversy, non-physician psychotherapy was given an adequate legal foundation through the creation of two new academic healthcare professions.

== Greece ==
Since 1979, the title "psychologist" has been protected by law in Greece. It can only be used by people who hold a relevant license or certificate, which is issued by the Greek authorities, to practice as a psychologist. The minimum requirement is the completion of university training in psychology at a Greek university, or at a university recognized by the Greek authorities. Psychologists in Greece are legally required to abide by the Code of Conduct of Psychologists (2019). Psychologists in Greece are not required to register with any psychology body in the country in order to legally practice the profession. Titles such as "psychotherapist" or "counselor" are not protected by law in Greece and anyone may call themselves a "psychotherapist" or "counselor" without having earned a graduate degree in psychology.

== India ==
In India, "clinical psychologist" is specifically defined in the Mental Health Act, 2017. An MPhil in Clinical Psychology degree of two years duration recognized by the Rehabilitation Council of India is required to apply for registration as a clinical psychologist. PsyD and Professional diploma in Clinical Psychology is also a less popular way to get license of Clinical Psychologist in India. This procedure has been criticized by some stakeholders since clinical psychology is not limited to the area of rehabilitation. Titles such as "counselor", "psychoanalyst", "psychoeducator" or "psychotherapist" are not protected at present. In other words, an individual may call themselves a "psychotherapist" or "counselor" without having any recognized degree from Rehabilitation council of India and without having to register with the Rehabilitation Council of India. Rehabilitation psychologists also require a license from RCI to practice. Psychologs magazine is the major media, working on mental health awareness. Tele-MANAS is a nationwide governmental program launched by Ministry of Health & Family Welfare in October 2021.

== New Zealand ==
In New Zealand, the use of the title "psychologist" is restricted by law. Prior to 2004, only the title "registered psychologist" was restricted to people qualified and registered as such. However, with the proclamation of the Health Practitioners Competence Assurance Act, in 2003, the use of the title "psychologist" was limited to practitioners registered with the New Zealand Psychologists Board. The titles "clinical psychologist", "counseling psychologist", "educational psychologist", "intern psychologist", and "trainee psychologist" are similarly protected. This is to protect the public by providing assurance that the title-holder is registered and therefore qualified and competent to practice, and can be held accountable. The legislation does not include an exemption clause for any class of practitioner (e.g., academics, or government employees).

== Norway ==
In Norway, the title "psychologist" is restricted by law and can only be obtained by completing a six-year integrated program, leading to the Candidate of Psychology degree. Psychologists are considered health personnel, and their work is regulated through the "health personnel act".

== South Africa ==
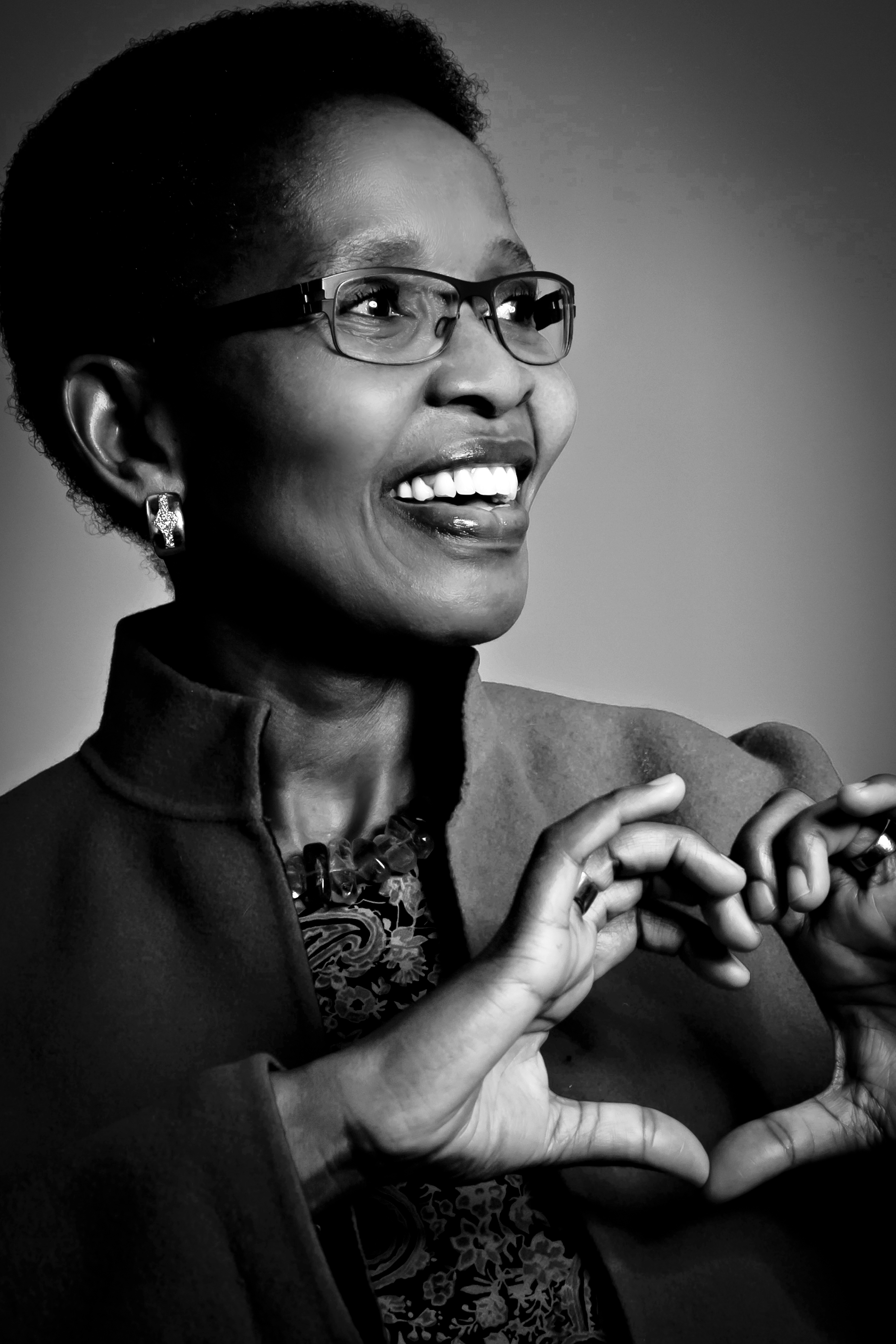
South African psychologist Pumla Gobodo-Madikizela

In South Africa, psychologists are qualified in either clinical, counseling, educational, organizational, or research psychology. As below, qualification requires at least five years of study, and at least one of internship.

To become qualified, one must complete a recognized master's degree in Psychology, an appropriate practicum at a recognized training institution, and take an examination set by the Professional Board for Psychology. Registration with the Health Professions Council of South Africa (HPCSA) is required and includes a Continuing Professional Development component.

The practicum usually involves a full year internship, and in some specializations, the HPCSA requires completion of an additional year of community service. The master's program consists of seminars, coursework-based theoretical and practical training, and a dissertation of limited scope, and is (in most cases) two years in duration. Prior to enrolling in the master's program, the student studies psychology for three years as an undergraduate (B.A. or B.Sc., and, for organizational psychology, also B.Com.), followed by an additional postgraduate honours degree in psychology; see List of universities in South Africa.

The undergraduate B.Psyc. is a four-year program integrating theory and practical training, and—with the required examination set by the Professional Board for Psychology—is sufficient for practice as a psychometrist or counselor.

== United Kingdom ==
In the UK, "registered psychologist" and "practitioner psychologist" are protected titles. The following specialist titles for practitioner psychologists are protected by law: "clinical psychologist", "counselling psychologist", "educational psychologist", "forensic psychologist", "health psychologist", "occupational psychologist" and "sport and exercise psychologist". The title of "psychologist" is not protected, and nor is "neuropsychologist". The title "chartered psychologist" is not regulated, it simply means that the psychologist is a chartered member of the British Psychological Society, but is not necessarily registered with the HCPC. The Health and Care Professions Council (HCPC) is the statutory regulator for practitioner psychologists in the UK. They restrict use of the listed titles to psychologists on the register in that category. The requirement to register as a clinical, counselling, or educational psychologist is a professional doctorate (and in the case of the latter two the British Psychological Society's Professional Qualification, which meets the standards of a professional doctorate). The title of "psychologist", by itself, is not protected. Currently, it is not illegal for someone who is not in the appropriate section of the HCPC register to provide psychological services, and some psychologists use unregulated titles like "child psychologist" or "consultant psychologist" or "school psychologist". This can include people who have been struck off, or those who do not have sufficient qualifications to become registered. Unlike most other countries, there are currently no consequences beyond advertising standards to protect the public from those who choose to get around the regulations by using other titles. The British Psychological Society is working with the HCPC to ensure that the title of "neuropsychologist" is regulated as a specialist title for practitioner psychologists.

=== Employment ===
As of December 2012, in the United Kingdom, there are 19,000 practitioner psychologists registered across seven categories: clinical psychologist, counselling psychologist, educational psychologist, forensic psychologist, health psychologist, occupational psychologist, sport and exercise psychologist. At least 9,500 of these are clinical psychologists, which is the largest group of psychologists in clinical settings such as the NHS. Around 2,000 are educational psychologists.

== United States and Canada ==
=== Education and training ===
In the United States and Canada, full membership in each country's professional association—American Psychological Association (APA) and Canadian Psychological Association (CPA), respectively—requires doctoral training (except in some Canadian provinces, such as Alberta, where a master's degree is sufficient). (Note: APA membership is not a requirement for licensure in any of the 50 US states. This fact should not be confused with APA accreditation of graduate psychology programs and clinical internships.) The minimal requirement for full membership can be waived in circumstances where there is evidence that significant contribution or performance in the field of psychology has been made. Associate membership requires at least two years of postgraduate studies in psychology or an approved related discipline.

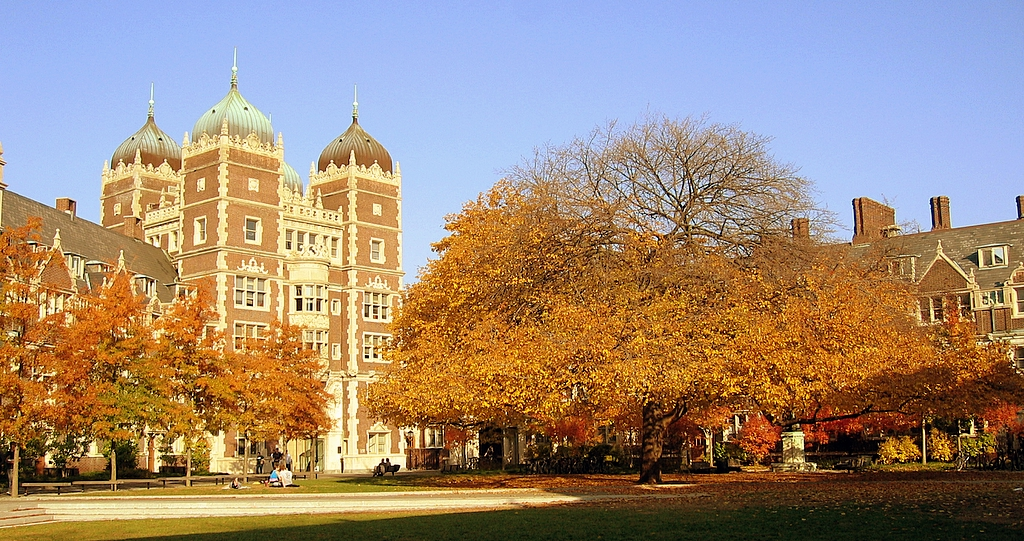
The University of Pennsylvania was the first institution to offer formal education in clinical psychology in the U.S.

Some U.S. schools offer accredited programs in clinical psychology resulting in a master's degree. Such programs can range from forty-eight to eighty-four units, most often taking two to three years to complete after the undergraduate degree. Training usually emphasizes theory and treatment over research, quite often with a focus on school or couples and family counseling. Similar to doctoral programs, master's level students usually must complete a clinical practicum under supervision; some programs also require a minimum amount of personal psychotherapy. While many graduates from master's level training go on to doctoral psychology programs, a large number also go directly into practice—often as a licensed professional counselor (LPC), marriage and family therapist (MFT), or other similar licensed practice, which varies by state.

There is stiff competition to gain acceptance into clinical psychology doctoral programs (acceptance rates of 2–5% are not uncommon). Clinical psychologists in the U.S. undergo many years of graduate training—usually five to seven years after the bachelor's degree—to gain demonstrable competence and experience. Licensure as a psychologist may take an additional one to two years post-PhD/PsyD. Some states require a 1-year postdoctoral residency, while others do not require postdoctoral supervised experience and allow psychology graduates to sit for the licensure exam immediately. Some psychology specialties, such as clinical neuropsychology, require a 2-year postdoctoral experience regardless of the state, as set forth in the Houston Conference Guidelines. Today in America, about half of all clinical psychology graduate students are being trained in PhD programs that emphasize melding research with practice and are conducted by universities—with the other half in PsyD programs, which less focus on research (similar to professional degrees for medicine and law). Both types of doctoral programs (PhD and PsyD) envision practicing clinical psychology in a research-based, scientifically valid manner, and most are accredited by the APA.

APA accreditation is very important for U.S. clinical, counseling, and school psychology programs because graduating from a non-accredited doctoral program may adversely affect employment prospects and present a hurdle for becoming licensed in some jurisdictions.

Doctorate (PhD and PsyD) programs usually involve some variation on the following five to seven year, 90–120 unit curriculum:

- Bases of behavior—biological, cognitive-affective, and cultural-social
- Individual differences—personality, lifespan development, psychopathology
- History and systems—development of psychological theories, practices and scientific knowledge
- Clinical practice—diagnostics, psychological assessment, psychotherapeutic interventions, psychopharmacology, ethical and legal issues
- Coursework in statistics and research design
- Clinical experience
  - Practicum—usually three or four years of working with clients under supervision in a clinical setting. Most practicum placements begin in either the first or second year of doctoral training.
  - Doctoral internship—usually an intensive one or two-year placement in a clinical setting
- Dissertation—PhD programs usually require original quantitative empirical research, while PsyD dissertations involve original quantitative or qualitative research, theoretical scholarship, program evaluation or development, critical literature analysis or clinical application and analysis. The dissertation typically takes 2–3 years to complete.
- Specialized electives—many programs offer sets of elective courses for specializations, such as health, child/adolescent, family, community, or neuropsychology.
- Personal psychotherapy—many programs require students to undertake a certain number of hours of personal psychotherapy (with a non-faculty therapist) although in recent years this requirement has become less frequent.
- Comprehensive exams or master's thesis: a thesis can involve original data collection and is distinct from a dissertation.

Psychologists can be seen as practicing within two general categories of psychology: health service psychology, which includes "practitioners" or "professionals" and research-oriented psychology which includes "scientists" or "scholars". The training models (Boulder and Vail models) endorsed by the APA require that health service psychologists be trained as both researchers and practitioners, (Note: See: Scientist–practitioner model and Practitioner–scholar model) and that they possess advanced degrees.

Psychologists typically have one of two degrees: PsyD or PhD. The PsyD program prepares the student primarily as a practitioner for clinical practice (e.g., testing, psychotherapy), but also as a scholar that consumes research. Depending on the specialty (industrial/organizational, social, clinical, school, etc.), a PhD may be trained in clinical practice as well as in scientific methodology, to prepare for a career in academia or research. Both the PsyD and PhD programs prepare students to take the national psychology licensing exam, the Examination for Professional Practice in Psychology (EPPP).

Within the two main categories are many further types of psychologists as reflected by APA's 54 Divisions, which are specialty or subspecialty or topical areas, including clinical, counseling, and school psychologists. Such professionals work with persons in a variety of therapeutic contexts. People often think of the discipline as involving only such clinical or counseling psychologists. While counseling and psychotherapy are common activities for psychologists, these health service psychology fields are just two branches in the larger domain of psychology. There are other classifications such as industrial and organizational and community psychologists, whose professionals mainly apply psychological research, theories, and techniques to "real-world" problems of business, industry, social benefit organizations, government, and academia.

==== APA-recognized specialties ====
- Clinical psychology
- Clinical neuropsychology
- Clinical child and adolescent psychology
- Clinical-community psychology
- Community psychology
- School psychology
- Behavioral and cognitive psychology
- Couple and family psychology
- Clinical health psychology
- Geropsychology
- Police and public safety psychology
- Sleep psychology
- Rehabilitation psychology
- Group psychology and group psychotherapy
- Forensic psychology
- Industrial and organizational psychology
- Psychoanalysis
- Counseling psychology
- Serious mental illness psychology
- Clinical psychopharmacology

Clinical psychologists receive training in a number of psychological therapies, including behavioral, cognitive, humanistic, existential, psychodynamic, and systemic approaches, as well as in-depth training in psychological testing, and to some extent, neuropsychological testing.

==== Services ====
Clinical psychologists can offer a range of professional services, including:

- Psychological treatment (psychotherapy)
- Administering, scoring, and interpreting psychological tests
- Prescribing medications (in nine states)
- Conducting psychological research
- Teaching
- Developing prevention programs
- Consulting
- Program administration
- Expert testimony
- Supervision of students or other mental health professionals

In practice, clinical psychologists might work with individuals, couples, families, or groups in a variety of settings, including private practices, hospitals, community mental health centers, schools, businesses, and non-profit agencies.

Most clinical psychologists who engage in research and teaching do so within a college or university setting. Clinical psychologists may also choose to specialize in a particular field.

===== Prescriptive Authority for Psychologists (RxP) =====
Psychologists in the United States campaigned for legislative changes to enable specially-trained psychologists to prescribe psychotropic medications. Legislation in Idaho, Iowa, Louisiana, New Mexico, Illinois, Colorado, Utah, Vermont, and Hawai'i has granted those who complete an additional master's degree program in clinical psychopharmacology authority to prescribe medications for mental and emotional disorders. As of 2019, Louisiana is the only state where the licensing and regulation of the practice of medical psychology by medical psychologists (MPs) is regulated by a medical board (the Louisiana State Board of Medical Examiners) rather than a board of psychologists. While other states have pursued prescriptive authority, they have not succeeded. Similar legislation in the state of Oregon passed through its legislative bodies, but the legislation was vetoed by the state's governor.

In 1989, the U.S. Department of Defense was directed to create the Psychopharmacology Demonstration Project (PDP). By 1997, ten psychologists were trained in psychopharmacology and granted the ability to prescribe psychiatric medications.

==== Licensure ====
The practice of clinical psychology requires a license in the United States and Canada. Although each of the U.S. states is different in terms of requirements and licenses (see and for examples), there are three common requirements:

1. Graduation from an accredited school with the appropriate degree
2. Completion of supervised clinical experience
3. Passing a written and/or oral examination

All U.S. state and Canada provincial licensing boards are members of the Association of State and Provincial Psychology Boards (ASPPB) which created and maintains the Examination for Professional Practice in Psychology (EPPP). Many states require other examinations in addition to the EPPP, such as a jurisprudence (i.e., mental health law) examination or an oral examination. Nearly all states also require a certain number of continuing education credits per year in order to renew a license. Licensees can obtain this through various means, such as taking audited classes and attending approved workshops.

There are professions whose scope of practice overlaps with the practice of psychology (particularly with respect to providing psychotherapy) and for which a license is required.

==== Ambiguity of title ====
To practice with the title of "psychologist", in almost all cases a doctoral degree is required (PhD, PsyD, or EdD in the U.S.). Normally, after the degree, the practitioner must fulfill a certain number of supervised postdoctoral hours ranging from 1,500 to 3,000 (usually taking one to two years), and pass the EPPP and any other state or provincial exams. By and large, a professional in the U.S. must hold a doctoral degree in psychology (PsyD, EdD, or PhD), and/or have a state license to use the title psychologist. However, regulations vary from state to state. For example, in the states of Michigan, West Virginia, and Vermont, there are psychologists licensed at the master's level.

==== Differences with psychiatrists ====
Although clinical psychologists and psychiatrists share the same fundamental aim—the alleviation of mental distress—their training, outlook, and methodologies are often different. Perhaps the most significant difference is that psychiatrists are licensed physicians, and, as such, psychiatrists are apt to use the medical model to assess mental health problems and to also employ psychotropic medications as a method of addressing mental health problems.

Psychologists generally do not prescribe medication, although in some jurisdictions they do have prescription privileges. In nine U.S. states (New Mexico, Louisiana, Illinois, Iowa, Idaho, Colorado, Utah, Vermont, & Hawai'i), psychologists with clinical psychopharmacology training have been granted prescriptive authority for mental health disorders.

Psychologists receive extensive training in psychological test administration, scoring, interpretation, and reporting, while psychiatrists are not trained in psychological testing. In addition, psychologists (particularly those from PhD programs) spend several years in graduate school being trained to conduct behavioral research; their training includes research design and advanced statistical analysis. While this training is available for physicians via dual MD/PhD programs, it is not typically included in standard medical education, although psychiatrists may develop research skills during their residency or a psychiatry fellowship (post-residency).

Psychiatrists, as licensed physicians, have been trained more intensively in other areas, such as internal medicine and neurology, and may bring this knowledge to bear in identifying and treating medical or neurological conditions that present with primarily psychological symptoms such as depression, anxiety, or paranoia (e.g., hypothyroidism presenting with depressive symptoms, or pulmonary embolism with significant apprehension and anxiety).

=== Mental health professions ===
Comparison of mental health professionals in the US
Occupation	Degree	Common licenses	Prescription privilege	Mean 2022 income (USD)
Clinical psychologist	PhD/PsyD/EdD	Psychologist	Varies by state	$90,130
Counseling psychologist (doctorate)	PhD/PsyD/EdD	Psychologist	No	$65,000
Counselor (master's)	MA/MS/MEd	MFT/LPC/LHMC/LPA	No	$49,710
School psychologist	PhD/EdD/MS/EdS	School psychologist	No	$81,500
Psychiatrist	MD/DO	Psychiatrist	Yes	$226,880
Clinical social worker	PhD/DSW/MSW	LCSW	No	$55,350
Psychiatric nurse	MSN/BSN	RN	No	$75,330
Psychiatric and mental health nurse practitioner	DNP/PhD/MSN	APRN/APN/PMHNP	Yes (varies by state)	$121,610
Expressive/Art therapist	MA	ATR	No	$55,900

Sources:
- Marriage and Family Therapist (MFT). An MFT license requires a doctorate or master's degree. In addition, it usually involves two years of post-degree clinical experience under supervision, and licensure requires passing a written exam, commonly the National Examination for Marriage and Family Therapists, which is maintained by the American Association for Marriage and Family Therapy. In addition, most states require an oral exam. MFTs, as the title implies, work mostly with families and couples, addressing a wide range of common psychological problems. Some jurisdictions have exemptions that let someone practice marriage and family therapy without meeting the requirements for a license. That is, they offer a license but do not require that marriage and family therapists obtain one.
- Licensed Professional Counselor (LPC). Similar to the MFT, the LPC license requires a master's or doctorate degree, a minimum number of hours of supervised clinical experience in a pre-doc practicum, and the passing of the National Counselor Exam. Similar licenses are the Licensed Mental Health Counselor (LMHC), Licensed Clinical Professional Counselor (LCPC), and Clinical Counselor in Mental Health (CCMH). In some states, after passing the exam, a temporary LPC license is awarded and the clinician may begin the normal 3000-hour supervised internship leading to the full license allowing to practice as a counselor or psychotherapist, usually under the supervision of a licensed psychologist. Some jurisdictions have exemptions that allow counseling to practice without meeting the requirements for a license. That is, they offer a license but do not require that counselors obtain one.
- Licensed Psychological Associate (LPA) Twenty-six states offer a master's-only license, a common one being the LPA, which allows for the therapist to either practice independently, or, more commonly, under the supervision of a licensed psychologist, depending on the state. Common requirements are two to four years of post-master's supervised clinical experience and passing a Psychological Associates Examination. Other titles for this level of licensing include psychological technician (Alabama), psychological assistant (California), licensed clinical psychotherapist (Kansas), licensed psychological practitioner (Minnesota), licensed behavioral practitioner (Oklahoma), licensed psychological associate (North Carolina) or psychological examiner (Tennessee).
- Licensed behavior analysts

Licensed behavior analysts are licensed in five states to provide services for clients with substance abuse, developmental disabilities, and mental illness. This profession draws on the evidence base of applied behavior analysis and the philosophy of behaviorism. Behavior analysts have at least a master's degree in behavior analysis or in a mental health related discipline, as well as having taken at least five core courses in applied behavior analysis. Many behavior analysts have a doctorate. Most programs have a formalized internship program, and several programs are offered online. Most practitioners have passed the examination offered by the Behavior Analyst Certification Board The model licensing act for behavior analysts can be found at the Association for Behavior Analysis International's website.

=== Employment ===
In the United States, of 204,300 jobs for psychologists in 2024, 76,300 were employed in clinical or counseling positions, 67,200 were employed in school positions, 5,600 were employed in industrial-organizational positions, and 55,300 were in "all other" positions. The median U.S. salary for clinical and counseling psychologists in May 2024 was US$95,830, the median salary for school psychologists was US$86,930, and the median salary for industrial-organizational psychologists was US$109,840.

Psychologists can work in applied or academic settings. Academic psychologists educate higher education students, as well as conduct research, with graduate-level research being an important part of academic psychology. Academic positions can be tenured or non-tenured, with tenured positions being highly desirable.

== See also ==
- List of psychologists
- Mental health professional
- List of psychological topics
- List of psychologists on postage stamps
