= Australian Psychological Society =

Professional association for psychologists

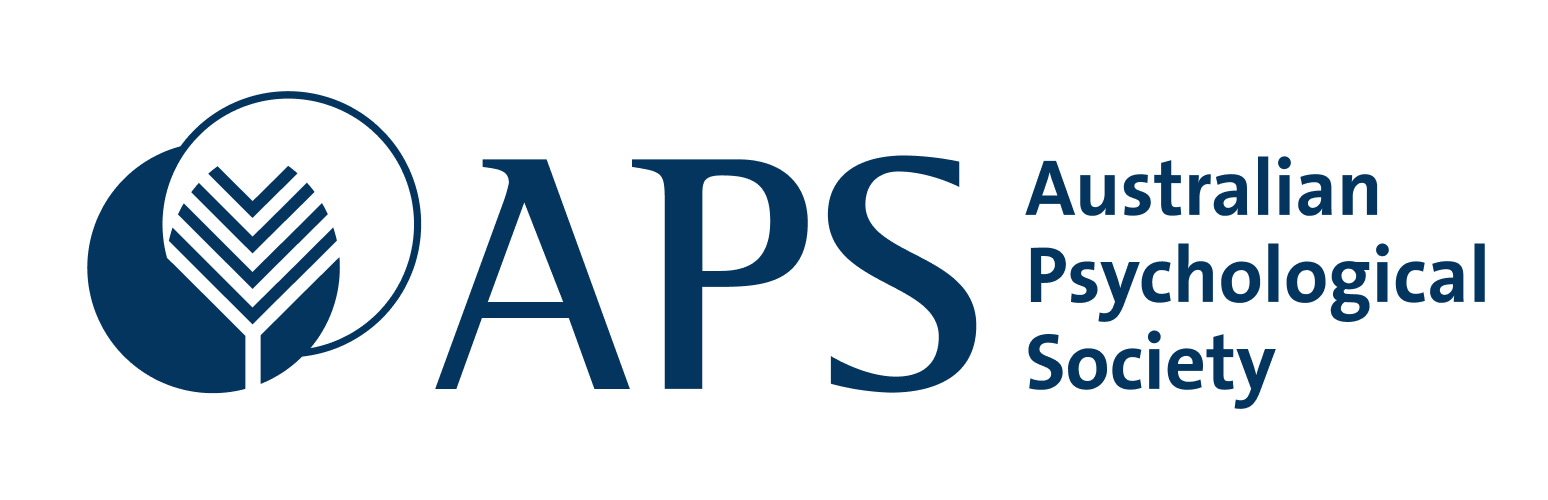
- APS logo
- Formation: 1966
- Headquarters: Level 11, 257 Collins Street; Melbourne, Australia
- Members: 25,000
- CEO: Zena Burgess
- President: Dr Kelly Gough
- Website: psychology.org.au

The Australian Psychological Society (APS) is Australia's leading association for psychologists in Australia, with more than 25,000 members. The APS works to improve the lives of Australians through psychology, working in diverse settings and sectors around the country. The APS helps the community to understand and access psychology via education, advocacy, and evidence-based practice.

== Membership ==
The APS offers several membership grades. Each grade has specific requirements, which are generally based on an applicant’s level of tertiary education in psychology. Applicants must be qualified in, or be studying, psychology programs accredited by the Australian Psychology Accreditation Council (APAC). Overseas-trained applicants must have been assessed by the APS as having qualifications comparable to the APAC-accredited six-year sequence.

== The APS Code of Ethics ==
The APS Code of Ethics was adopted by the organisation in 2007, and by the Psychology Board of Australia in 2010. The Board has developed its first regulatory code of conduct, which will come into effect on 1 December 2025.

== APS Presidents ==
The following have been Presidents of the Australian Psychological Society.

President	Term	Psychology Board of Australia Area of Endorsement(s)
Andrew Chua	2025-present	
Dr Sara Quinn	2024-2025	Clinical
Catriona Davis-McCabe	2022-2024	Counselling
Tamara Cavenett	2020–2022	Clinical
Ros Knight	2018–2020	Clinical, Counselling
Anthony Cichello	2016–2018	Clinical, Counselling, Health
Mike Kyrios	2014–2016	Clinical
Tim Hannan	2012–2014	Clinical, Clinical Neuro, Forensic, Health, Educational & Developmental, Sport & Exercise
Simon Crowe	2010–2012	Clinical, Clinical Neuro, Forensic
Bob Montgomery	2008–2010	Clinical, Health, Forensic
Amanda Gordon	2006–2008	Clinical, Health
Amanda Gordon	2004–2006	Clinical, Health
Paul R. Martin	2002–2004	Clinical, Health
Paul R. Martin	2000–2002	Clinical, Health
Bruce J. Crowe	1998–2000	Organisational
Bruce J. Crowe	1996–1998	Organisational
Barry J. Fallon	1994–1996	
Kevin McConkey	1993–1994	
Susan Kelly	1992–1993	
Frank D. Naylor	1991–1992	
Barry McGaw	1990–1991	
John K. Collins	1989–1990	
Gordon V. Stanley	1988–1989	
Leon Mann	1987–1988	
Donald McNicol	1986–1987	
Daphne M. Keats	1985–1986	
Malcolm B. Macmillan; Ian Waterhouse	1984–1985	Clinical
Clive Williams	1983–1984	
Ian K. Waterhouse	1982–1983	
Michael C. Knowles	1981–1982	Organisational
Ronald C. King	1980–1981	
Kenneth C. Gray	1979–1980	
Norman T. Feather	1978–1979	
Peter Sheehan	1977–1978	
A. George Owens	1976–1977	
George Singer	1975–1976	
Alastair Heron	1974–1975	
Alexander M. Clarke	1973–1974	
Ronald W. Cumming	1972–1973	
Mary C. Nixon	1971–1972	
Aubrey J. Yates	1970–1971	
John A. Keats	1969–1970	
Sydney H. Lovibond	1968–1969	
Alex (Tim) J. Marshall	1967–1968	
Ross H. Day	1966–1967	
Richard A. Champion	1966	

== Journals and events ==
The APS publishes science journals with the latest research in psychology, and the conceptual and policy issues affecting the field. These include the Australian Journal of Psychology, Australian Psychologist, Clinical Psychologist, Educational and Developmental Psychologist and The Australian Community Psychologist. APS promotes and facilitates psychology-related events, including the APS Festival of Psychology and APS Psychology Career Expo.

== Education and training ==
The APS has nine colleges representing different areas of practice. The Colleges support practice standards and quality assurance, organise education and training, and information sharing with members. The Colleges include: Clinical Neuropsychologists, Clinical Psychologists, Community Psychologists, Counselling Psychologists, Educational and Developmental Psychologists, Forensic Psychologists, Health Psychologists, Organisational Psychologists and Sport and Exercise Psychologists.

Registration requirements are determined by the Psychology Board of Australia (PsyBA) under the National Registration and Accreditation Scheme.

General registration requires a minimum six-year sequence of education and training. This typically includes a four-year Board-approved accredited sequence of study in psychology, followed by one of the below pathways.

Fourth-year graduates can choose from:

- The higher degree pathway, which is an approved postgraduate degree accredited at the fifth and sixth year level (eg. two-year Masters) or higher (eg. three or four year Doctorate), or
- The 5+1 internship pathway. This requires you to pass the national psychology exam before applying for general registration.

Psychologists must be registered with the Psychology Board of Australia, and meet the Board's registration standards, in order to practise in Australia.

== See also ==
- American Psychological Association
- Australian Counselling Association
- Psychotherapy and Counselling Federation of Australia
- Psychologists Board of Queensland
