= Aída Mencía Ripley =

Academic

Aída Teresa Mencía Ripley is an academic from the Dominican Republic. She is currently Vice-Chancellor for Research and Innovation and UNESCO Chairholder in Intersectional Gender Studies in Education and Psychology at Universidad Iberoamericana of the Dominican Republic (UNIBE).

She was born in Santo Domingo and raised in New York City (Queens). She is the daughter of Aída Ripley Gómez (the daughter of Dominican hall of fame sportsman Enrique Ripley Marín and former corporate lawyer Aída Gómez Rueda) and Rafael Mencía Ochoa. She is the niece of artist Geo Ripley. Her paternal grandfather was Dominican diplomat Rafael Mencía Lister.

== Education and career ==
Mencía-Ripley graduated summa cum laude from St. John's University with a B.A. in psychology and a minor in philosophy. She earned an M.A. from the Graduate Faculty of Political and Social Science of the New School for Social Research. She went on to obtain an M.A. and a Ph.D. from St. John's University in clinical psychology. While at St. John's she worked at the Social Stress and Health Research Unit under Dr. Elizabeth Brondolo.

She is a member of the American Psychological Association, the Interamerican Psychological Society, the Dominican College of Psychologists, and the Organization for Women in Science for the Developing World (OWSD).

Her main areas of research are women's studies, clinical and health psychology, and psychology of language.

She is an advocate for inclusive education in the Dominican Republic and was UNESCO Chair on Social and Academic Inclusion for People with Disabilities and Special Education Needs at UNIBE from 2013 to 2017. Since 2022 she has been UNESCO Chain on gender studies, focusing her research on Dominican women's leadership and wellbeing.

Her efforts as an academic administrator have focused on supporting research initiatives that address stigma and access to care for people living with HIV/AIDS and other historically marginalized groups in the Dominican Republic impacted by inequalities in both the healthcare and education system. She has also devoted considerable efforts to promote ethical and culturally respectful research conducted in developing countries paying special attention to issues of gender and ethnicity through intersectional and decolonial approaches. As Dean and later Vice-Chancellor of Research at UNIBE, she steered the initiatives that led to the creation of UNIBE´s research infrastructure and programs, including UNIBE's Institute for Tropical Medicine and Global Health, the Center for Research in Biomaterials and Dentistry, the Green Roof Laboratory, the Institute of Design for the Tropics, and the Neurocognition and Psychophysiology Laboratory.

In 2021, she was appointed Vice-Chancellor and led UNIBE's efforts in creating its first Research and Innovation Hub. Her work as Vice-Chancellor has focused on expanding research programs at UNIBE at both graduate and undergraduate levels, capacity building with focus on gender equity, and strengthening UNIBE's local and international research network.

== Awards ==
For her published research she won the 2017 José Salazar Award for best research paper in Revista Interamericana de Psicología.

In 2021, Forbes Central America chose her among the 100 most powerful women in Central America and the Dominican Republic.

In 2022, the Ministry of Foreign Affairs of the Dominican Republic recognized her efforts in promoting science for women in the Dominican Republic.

== Works and publications ==
Some publications of Mencía Ripley are:

- Brondolo, E., Wellington, R., Brady, N., Mencía-Ripley, A., Thompson, S., Cassells, A., et al. (2006). Racism and coping in a community sample of Black and Latino(a) adults. Annals of Behavioral Medicine, 31, S162.
- Denton, E., Mencía-Ripley, A., Ullah, J., Brondolo, E., Cassells, A., Cubbin, C. & Tobin, J. (2005). Demographic variations in exposure to ethnicity-related maltreatment. Annals of Behavioral Medicine, 29, S136.
- Brondolo, E., Grantham, K., Karlin, W., Taravella, J., Mencía Ripley, A., Schwartz, J.E., et al. (2009). Trait hostility and ambulatory blood pressure among traffic enforcement agents: The effects of stressful social interactions. Journal of Occupational Health Psychology, 14, 110-121.
- Mencía-Ripley, A., Schwartz, J., & Brondolo, E. (2015). Gender identity, interpersonal interactions, and ambulatory blood pressure. Interamerican Psychology Journal, 49 (2), 261-271.
- Thomas, T.M., Schanche Hodge, F., Kotkin-Jaszi, S., & Mencía-Ripley, A. (2016). Stress and coping among college students in the Dominican Republic.Californian Journal of Health Promotion, 15 (1), 78-84.
- Mencía-Ripley, A. (2020). Aceptación de la violencia de género en docentes de escuelas públicas. Revista Caribeña de Investigación Educativa (RECIE), 4(1), 81-91. https://doi.org/10.32541/recie.2020.v4i1.pp81-91
- Mencía-Ripley, A., Paulino-Ramírez, R., Jiménez, J.A. & Camilo, O. (2021). Decolonizing science diplomacy: A case study of the Dominican Republic's COVID-19 response. Frontiers in Research Metrics and Analytics, 6, 637187. doi:10.3389/frma.2021.637187
- Sánchez-Vincitore, L.V., Mencía-Ripley, A., Veras, C. & Ruiz-Matuk, C.B. (2023). External validity of a reading intervention for primary education as shown in Dominican sixth grade students performance on the national diagnostic evaluation. Revie, 10(1), 28-45.
- Riggio-Olivares, G., Mencía-Ripley, A., & Rosario-Díaz, R.I. (2024). La evaluación de la investigación en República Dominicana: Perspectiva de los actores del sistema nacional de ciencia, tecnología e innovación. Ciencia y Sociedad, 49(3). Doi: https://doi.org/10.22206/cys.2024.v49i3.3240
