= Alexandra Joel =

- Born: Susan Lea Joel; 11 December 1953 (age 72)
- Education: Abbotsleigh, University of Sydney, Australian College of Applied Psychology
- Occupation: Author
- Parent(s): Asher Joel; Sybil Jacobs
- Writing career
- Years active: 1984–present
- Genres: Non-Fiction, Fiction
- Website: www.alexandrajoel.com

Alexandra Joel (born Susan Lea Joel in 1953) is an internationally published Australian author and the former editor of Harper's Bazaar and Portfolio. Also she is a psychotherapist.

== Early life and education ==
Joel was born at St Margaret's Hospital, Darlinghurst on 11 December 1953 and was formerly known as Susan Lea Joel. She is the daughter of The Hon Sir Asher Alexander Joel KBE, AO. Alexandra attended Abbotsleigh School for Girls from 1962 to 1971 and completed her Arts degree with Honours in Government at the University of Sydney in 1976.

In 2002 she was awarded a graduate diploma from the Australian College of Applied Psychology, subsequently establishing a counselling and psychotherapy practice.

== Career ==
Alexandra Joel spent six months as an international intern on the staff of Congressman James H. Scheuer (D) in Washington, D.C., returning to Australia to work as a reporter and newsreader on a regional television station in Queensland.

In 1978 she became the executive director of ITQ8. At the time she was the only female board member of an Australian television station.

She was also a director of Mason Stewart Publishing (prior to its acquisition by British company Emap in 1997) and a director of the Asher Joel Media Group.

From 1979 to 1998 she contributed feature articles, interviews and reviews for major national and metropolitan publications including The Australian, Sydney Morning Herald Good Weekend Magazine, Cleo and Harper's Bazaar.

She was appointed editor of Harper's Bazaar in 1988. In 1991 she became the editor of Portfolio, Australia's first magazine for working women.

Her appointments have included:

- President of the Royal Hospital for Women Foundation
- Trustee of the Museum of Applied Arts and Sciences
- Board member, Commonwealth Government's Artbank

She lives in a beach town in the Los Santos Province of Panama.

== Bibliography ==
- 1984: Best Dressed: 200 Years of Fashion in Australia
- 1998: Parade: The Story of Fashion in Australia
- 2017: Rosetta: A Scandalous True Story
- 2020: The Paris Model
- 2021: The Royal Correspondent
- 2022: The Artist's Secret

Her book, Rosetta: A Scandalous True Story, was a biography of her unknown great-grandmother who ran away with a Chinese fortune teller named Zeno the Magnificent. It has been optioned for a mini-series by Matchbox Pictures, a subsidiary of NBCUniversal.

Rosetta: A Scandalous True Story was described by the Sydney Morning Herald as a 'thrilling study of reinvention'. The Australian called Joel herself 'a mesmerising storyteller'.

Her previous two books, Best Dressed: 200 Years of Fashion in Australia and Parade: The Story of Fashion in Australia both detailed the development of fashion, style and national identity.

The Paris Model, was published by HarperCollins Australia on 20 January 2020 and subsequently in the United States and Canada. It has also been published in Germany, Romania and Hungary.

The Royal Correspondent, was published by HarperCollins Australia on 3 February 2021, in September 2021 in the United States and Canada and is to be published in the UK on 25 May 2023.

Alexandra's latest novel The Artist's Secret, was published by HarperCollins Australia on 4 January 2023 and will be published in the United States and Canada on a date to be announced.
