= Australian College of Applied Professions =

Registered training program in Australia

ACAP University College (ACAP) formally The Australian College of Applied Professions is a registered training organisation and higher education provider that specialises in teaching Undergraduate and Postgraduate courses in psychology, counselling, social work, criminology, coaching, management and Law. ACAP is accredited by the Psychotherapy and Counselling Federation of Australia (PACFA), the Australian Psychology Accreditation Council (APAC).

ACAP University College has been in operation since 1983 and has campuses in six cities:

- Sydney
- Melbourne
- Brisbane
- Perth
- Adelaide
- Byron Bay.

It also offers courses via flexible delivery which allows students to study online. ACAP has changed its name Australian College of Applied Professions to ACAP University College (14 November 2024).

== Students ==
The current student population of ACAP including those studying on-campus and by flexible delivery is over 3,500. There are approximately 70 international students from a wide range of countries studying across the campuses. Students are taught by experienced academics with many also practising in the industry.

ACAP was established in Sydney in 1983 initially offering Psychology before extending into Human Resources, Sports & Performance Psychology, Management and Leadership in the early 2000s and offering the Graduate Diploma of Legal Practice in the early 2020s.

The courses offered by ACAP include:

- Associate Degree of Criminal Justice
- Bachelor of Counselling
- Bachelor of Criminology and Justice
- Bachelor of Psychological Science
- Bachelor of Psychological Science (Honours)
- Bachelor of Psychological Science and Counselling
- Bachelor of Psychological Science and Criminology
- Bachelor of Social Work
- Diploma of Counselling Skills
- Graduate Certificate in Applied Coaching
- Graduate Certificate of Business Administration
- Graduate Certificate of Counselling
- Graduate Certificate of Human Services
- Graduate Certificate of Psychological Science
- Graduate Diploma of Business Administration
- Graduate Diploma of Counselling
- Graduate Diploma of Legal Practice (PLT)
- Graduate Diploma of Psychological Science
- Graduate Diploma of Professional Psychology Practice
- Master of Counselling and Psychotherapy
- Master of Business Administration (MBA)
- Master of Professional Psychology
- Master of Psychology (Clinical)
- Master of Psychology Practice (Clinical)
- Master of Social Work (Qualifying)
- Undergraduate Certificate in Psychological Science

== History ==
- 1983–1989: ACAP founded by Cliff Moore in a small upstairs office on Broadway in Sydney
- 1989: Lionel Davis takes over
- 1993–1997: Accredited Counselling & VETAB
- 2003: ACAP becomes a HEP under the NSW Higher Education Act. Postgrad courses accredited in NSW & QLK
- 2005: FEE HELP introduced
- 2006: Navitas acquires ACAP
- 2021: ACAP rebranded to Australian College of Applied Professions
- 24 July 2024: ACAP was recognised as a University College by the Tertiary Education Quality and Standards Agency (TEQSA)
- 14 November 2024: Australian College of Applied Professions rebranded to ACAP University College.
