= EPPP =

EPPP may refer to:

- Elite Player Performance Plan
- Environmental persistent pharmaceutical pollutant
- Examination for Professional Practice in Psychology
- Enhanced Potential Pandemic Pathogens
