= Bob Montgomery (psychologist) =

Australian psychologist and child molester

Bob Montgomery is a prominent Australian former psychologist who was imprisoned for sexually abusing boys.

== Career ==
Montgomery was a scoutmaster until 1965 when Scouts New South Wales ended his membership due to concerns raised by parents. He was a psychiatric inpatient for several months afterwards. He then studied psychology at the University of Sydney while working as a schoolteacher.

In 1972, he moved to Melbourne and helped establish the psychology department at La Trobe University, where he ran a sex therapy clinic which was equipped with a double bed for research purposes. His lectures included lengthy footage of couples having sex, and students were made to replicate the controversial Milgram experiment.

After failing to become head of department, he left the university to run a private practice. In 1994, he became head of the psychology department at Bond University after being recruited by criminologist Paul Wilson, who was later convicted of child sex offences.

Montgomery often appeared on radio and television, including as a guest expert on the first season of Big Brother Australia. He was president of the Australian Psychological Society from about 2008 to 2010. As a private consultant, he prepared reports for the Family Court about whether allegations of sexual abuse raised during child custody disputes were credible. He also assessed the risk of paedophiles molesting children who were under the care of the Queensland Government.

== Arrest and conviction ==
Montgomery was arrested in January 2019 for offences he committed in the 1960s in the Sydney suburbs of Edgecliff and Marrickville. The victims were three 12-year-old boys in his scout troop, and a student at a high school where he taught. Montgomery pleaded guilty to charges of indecent assault and buggery. In December 2020, he was sentenced to four years' jail with a non-parole period of 12 months. The judge took into account that Montgomery has dementia and is expected to live about four more years. Montgomery and his wife, fellow psychologist Laurel Morris, were living at Runaway Bay on Queensland's Gold Coast at the time of his arrest. He was 76 years old.

== Bibliography ==
(co-authored with Laurel Morris)

- Living With Anxiety: A Clinically Tested Step-By-Step Plan for Drug-Free Management (2001)
- Surviving: Coping With A Life Crisis (2000)
- Your Good Health: A Whole Health Program to Live Healthier, Live Happier, and Live Longer (1995, 2nd edition)
- Successful Sex (1992)
- Getting on with the Oldies: Better Relationships with Parents and Other Adults (1990)
- Getting on with Your Teenagers (1990)
