= Dominican College of Psychologists =

Non-profit professional organization

- Abbreviation: CODOPSI
- Predecessor: Dominican Association of Psychology
- Formation: February 1, 2001; 25 years ago
- Type: Professional association
- Purpose: Regulation, promotion and safeguarding of the ethical practice of psychology in the Dominican Republic.
- Headquarters: Santo Domingo, Distrito Nacional, Dominican Republic
- Members: Approximately 28,000 registered psychologists.
- President: Abril María Arias Taveras
- General secretary: Celinés Madera de Lara
- Website: www.codopsi.com.do

The Dominican College of Psychologists (CODOPSI), is a non-profit organization that regulates the practice of Psychology in the Dominican Republic.

== History ==
=== Dominican Association of Psychology ===
Before the CODOPSI was created, the study of Psychology in the Dominican Republic was promoted by the Dominican Association of Psychology (ADOPSI). This entity was founded in 1976 and its main focus was to promote Psychology in the Dominican Republic by holding events and looking for ways to integrate psychologists and their studies into Dominican society.

The ADOPSI held 11 symposiums around the country, in which they highlighted the contributions of Psychology and why these were relevant to society. In 1981, under the guidance of Elizabeth De Windt and with the collaboration of the Interamerican Psychological Society, the Dominican Association of Psychology held the XVIII Interamerican Congress of Psychology.

In the year 2000, the ADOPSI stopped its efforts as it was replaced by the Dominican College of Psychologists.

=== Law 22-01 ===
In 2001 the executive power of the Dominican Republic put into effect law No. 22-01 which created the legal basis for the College of Psychologists to be funded. This law states that:

The Dominican College of Psychologists is invested with legal personality and its own assets for an undefined period of time. Its legal domicile will be located in the city of Santo Domingo, the capital of the Dominican Republic. It will function in conformity with the goals established by this law, the ethics, discipline, and the statutes of its code.

— Law No. 22-01, Chapter II, Art. 6

The law also covers the requirements for the legal practice of Psychology in the Dominican Republic, the ethics and disciplinary guidelines for psychologists, and the sanctions in case of infringement.

=== Dominican College of Psychologists ===
The first president of the CODOPSI was the psychologist Rolando Tabar Manzur who highlighted the connection of the College with the ADOPSI. Tabar Manzur also promoted the importance of psychologists and psychological studies in society.

== Legal Practice of Psychology ==
The main requirement to practice psychology in the Dominican Republic is obtaining an Exequatur (from Latin, meaning 'to let (referring to an individual 'act'). To obtain the Exequatur, the person applying must have a valid bachelor's degree, needs to be a member of the CODOPSI and needs to present a series of required documents (such as copies of the university degree, certifications of studies at the bachelor's degree level [in original format and in format legalized by the MESCyT], birth certificate, copies of the Identity and Electoral Card [Dominican National Identity Card], a letter addressed to the President of the Dominican Republic, and a certificate of absence of criminal records issued by the Attorney General's Office of the Dominican Republic) before the Ministry of Public Health and Social Assistance of the Dominican Republic.

== Events ==
Throughout the years both the ADOPSI and the CODOPSI have held events for the promotion of Psychology and psychological knowledge in the Dominican Republic:

| Year | Name | Institution |
|---|---|---|
| 1953 | First Interamerican Congress of Psychology | Interamerican Society of Psychology |
| 1981 | XVIII Interamerican Congress of Psychology | Dominican Association of Psychology |
| 1981 | First Encounter Dominico-Hispano about Mental Health in Children and Teenagers | Dominican Association of Psychology |
| 1993 | First National Congress "Advances in Psychology" | Dominican Association of Psychology |
| 1994 | Second Congress Dominico-Hispano about Mental Health in Children and Teenagers | Dominican Association of Psychology |
| 1997 | Congress "30 years of Dominican Psychology: Past, Present, and Future" | Dominican Association of Psychology |
| 2001 | Interuniversity Congress of Psychology from the Caribbean and Central America: Accomplishments and Perspectives | Dominican College of Psychologists |
| 2004 | International Congress "Where is Psychology headed?" | Dominican College of Psychologists |
