= Australian Psychology Accreditation Council =

Accrediting body for Australian psychologists

- Abbreviation: APAC
- Formation: 2005; 21 years ago
- Type: Nonprofit
- Legal status: charity
- Location: Australia
- Board Chair: John Dunn
- CEO: David Ensor
- Staff: 7.2 FTEs (2024)
- Website: https://apac.au/

The Australian Psychology Accreditation Council (APAC) is an independent quality and standards organisation appointed by Australian Governments under the Health Practitioner Regulation National Law Act 2009 as the accrediting authority for the education and training of psychologists in Australia. APAC's main role is to assess programs of study in psychology and the education providers offering them, to ensure that graduates of APAC-accredited programs are adequately qualified to safely employ their psychological knowledge and skills in the community. Applicants seeking registration to practice as a psychologist though the Australian Health Practitioner Regulation Agency (AHPRA) are required to have completed programs of study which are APAC accredited and subsequently approved by the Psychology Board of Australia.

== Governance ==
APAC was formed in 2005 and is a not-for-profit company limited by guarantee established to develop and maintain national standards for the education and training of psychologists. APAC is governed by a board of 12 directors comprising: 4 directors nominated by the Psychology Board of Australia, 4 directors nominated by the Heads of Department and Schools of Psychology Association, and 4 directors nominated by the Australian Psychological Society.

== Functions ==
APAC's functions include: the development of standards for education, training and assessment of competence in psychology; assessing higher education providers and their programs of study to determine whether they meet approved accreditation standards; assessing accrediting and examining authorities in other countries to determine whether graduates accredited by them have the knowledge, skills and professional attributes necessary to practise in Australia; promoting quality improvement among higher education providers, and advising the PsyBA, government and other agencies regarding education and training in the psychology discipline.

== Accreditation ==
APAC accredits over 420 courses and 40 higher education providers operating in Australia, Singapore and Malaysia. Accreditation is for a term of 5 years following a phased assessment process including a site visit by a team of assessors. Regular compliance reporting by education providers is a condition of accreditation. APAC also conducts a program of monitoring and auditing of accredited programs and providers to determine if standards are continuing to be met. Re-assessment may be required where significant changes to providers and/or their programs of study have occurred, or where credible information has been received that an accredited program has ceased to meet the required standards. APAC is a member of the Health Professions Accreditation Councils’ Forum and the International Network for Quality Assurance Agencies in Higher Education.

== See also ==
- Psychologists Board of Queensland
