= Asher Joel =

Australian politician

Sir Asher Joel KBE, AO

Member of the New South Wales Legislative Council
- In office 23 April 1958 – 5 November 1978

Personal details
- Born: 4 May 1912 Stanmore, New South Wales
- Died: 12 November 1998 (aged 86) Sydney, New South Wales
- Party: Country Party
- Children: Alexandra Joel
- Occupation: Public relations and advertising executive

Military service
- Allegiance: Australia
- Branch/service: Second Australian Imperial Force (1942); Royal Australian Naval Volunteer Reserve (1942–45)
- Years of service: 1942–1945
- Rank: Lieutenant
- Battles/wars: Second World War
- Awards: Bronze Star Medal (United States)

Sir Asher Alexander Joel KBE, AO (4 May 1912 – 12 November 1998) was an Australian public figure and a member of the New South Wales Legislative Council for 20 years. Although he was Jewish, he received a papal knighthood in 1994.

== Career ==
In the 1930s he worked in journalism and public relations.

During World War II, he enlisted in the Second Australian Imperial Force in 1942, then transferred to the Royal Australian Navy, joining the staff of General Douglas MacArthur between 1944 and 1945. He was discharged with the rank of lieutenant on 17 August 1945.

In 1946 he founded Asher Joel Pty Ltd, a public relations firm. He was instrumental in the 1949 founding of the Public Relations Institute of Australia.

In 1958, Joel was elected to the New South Wales Legislative Council as an Independent, but joined the then Country Party (now the National Party) the following year. In 1971–1972, he served as party treasurer, and in 1971, he served on the central executive. He retired from the Legislative Council in 1978.

In 1975, he established the Sir Asher Joel Foundation to assist Macquarie University students to participate on archaeological digs with Tel Aviv University.

During the course of his career, he helped to organise a number of large-scale events, acting in an honorary capacity:

- the visit of Princess Alexandra of Kent in 1956
- the visit of U.S. President Lyndon B. Johnson in 1966
- the visit of Pope Paul VI in 1970.

He was also heavily involved with the establishment of the Sydney Opera House.

He was also a member of NAJEX (NSW Association of Jewish Service & Ex-Service Men & Women); it is one of the oldest Jewish organisations in Australia.

== Death ==
At Joel's funeral in 1998, Rabbi Raymond Apple of the Great Synagogue, Sydney, described Joel as an "Australian legend", having "walked with kings, queens, princes of the Church... with a genuine aristocracy of personality and presence. He had elegance, style and bearing, but humanity too."

Joel was survived by his wife Lady Joel (née Sybil Jacobs, 1924–2024), children Richard, David, Michael, Alexandra and grandchildren Natasha, Phoebe, Bennett, Alina, Arabella and Nicholas.

== Honours ==
The honours Joel received included:

- U.S. Bronze Star Medal, 1945
- Officer of the Order of the British Empire (OBE), 1956
- Knight Bachelor, 1971
- Knight Commander of the Order of the British Empire (KBE), 1974
- Maginoo (Officer) of the Ancient Order of Sikatuna, Philippines, 1975
- Torch of Learning Award of the Hebrew University of Jerusalem, 1978
- Knight Commander of Rizal, Philippines, 1978
- Officer of the Order of Australia (AO), 1986
- Citation of Honour, New South Wales Jewish Board of Deputies, 1992
- Knight of the Order of St. Sylvester (papal knighthood), 1994
- Certificate of Honour from the Hebrew University of Jerusalem

== Books ==
- Australian Protocol and Procedures, 1982
- Without Chains, Free, 1977
