= College of Psychologists of Ontario =

Canadian regulatory college

- Formation: 1960
- Headquarters: 110 Eglinton Avenue West, Toronto, Ontario, Canada
- Website: www.cpo.on.ca

The College of Psychologists of Ontario (CPO) is the regulatory college for the profession of psychology in Ontario, Canada. It sets the standards for the provision of psychological services by Psychologists and Psychological Associates.

The college maintains a register of all currently registered practitioners.

== Profile ==
Through its committees, the college carries out various responsibilities, such as:

- Setting requirements for entry to practice and administer the oral and written registration examinations
- Registering qualified Psychologists and Psychological Associates
- Setting and monitoring practice standards and ethical behaviour of the profession
- Administering the Quality Assurance program and ensuring continued competence of the profession
- Providing educational materials and information to the public and the profession regarding the practice of psychology
- Investigating complaints and addressing concerns about the quality of service delivered that have not been resolved satisfactorily between the client and practitioner

=== Publications ===
The college publishes a bulletin quarterly “HeadLines”. The bulletin articles provide information about elections, changes within the council, regulation changes, amendments, and other current events relating to the college. A message from the current president is featured in the bulletin. The College of Psychologists of Ontario also prepare an annual report detailing its activities and financial affairs, listed in its References section.

=== Affiliate organizations ===
These are various organizations affiliated with the College of Psychologists of Ontario.

- Association of Canadian Psychology Regulatory Organizations (ACPRO)
- Association of State and Provincial Psychology Boards (ASPPB)

== History ==
The College of Psychologists set the boundaries and standards that need to be met between psychologists and/or psychological associates and their client(s),. These are outlined in the Standards of Professional Conduct. The college also provides steps that doctors need to take to protect a patient's privacy, in regards to Personal Health Information Protection Act, 2004 (PHIPA).

=== Founding ===
The College of Psychologists of Ontario (CPO) was established in 1960 through the Psychologists Registration Act, since amended. In Canada, it became the first psychology regulatory legislation.

In 2010 the college celebrated the 50th anniversary of Psychology regulation in Ontario. The ceremony was attended by many former and current council members including Dr. Barbara Wand, Former Board member and chair, as well as Jack Schaffer, President of the Association of State and Provincial Psychology Board(ASPPB).

=== 2023 action against member Jordan Peterson ===
The College received widespread media attention after it required Jordan Peterson, who is a member of the College and a political commentator, to undertake social media training. Peterson unsuccessfully challenged the order in Ontario Divisional Court.

== The Council ==
The Council of the College of Psychologists of Ontario is the governing body of the college. The Council sets policies and provides leadership and direction to the profession. There are 18 Council member positions: eight professional members elected by the profession from across the province, one being a non-voting member; three appointed academic members; and, a maximum of eight members of the public appointed by the provincial government. The Council meets four times a year and meetings are open to the public.

== Prospective members ==
In Ontario, there are two regulated titles respecting the practice of psychology. For the title psychologist, one requires a doctorate degree in psychology. For the title psychological associate, one requires a master's degree in psychology and at least four years of relevant, post-master's degree experience.

For new applicants, each title consists of two types of certificates available according to Ontario Regulation 533/98, Registration.

1. The Certificate Authorizing Supervised Practice is intended for persons who have not previously been registered for psychological service provision in any jurisdiction, or who have been registered less than five years in a jurisdiction where the requirements are not comparable to Ontario requirements; or
2. The Certificate Authorizing Interim Autonomous Practice is intended for individuals:

- Who are registered in a province or territory included in the Mutual Recognition Agreement (MRA); or,
- Who are registered/licensed in a jurisdiction that is part of the Association of State and Provincial Psychology Board's (ASPPB) Agreement of Reciprocity; or
- Who hold a Certificate of Professional Qualification (CPQ) granted by the Association of State and Provincial Psychology Board (ASPPB).
