= Psychotherapy and Counselling Federation of Australia =

Professional industry body

The Psychotherapy and Counselling Federation of Australia (PACFA) is the umbrella professional body that plays a self-regulating role in the psychotherapy and counselling industry. It represents the interests of more than 3000 practitioners of various forms of psychotherapy and counselling in Australia. It cooperates with 40 related associations to set and meet standards in all states and territories of Australia. The counselling profession in Australia is currently not government regulated so clients are faced with the task of evaluating qualifications of various counsellors and psychotherapists. PACFA is one of two industry associations that is campaigning for government accreditation of counselling in Australia.

== See also ==
- Australian Psychological Society
- Australian Counselling Association
- United Kingdom Council for Psychotherapy
