= Paul Wilson (criminologist) =

Australian criminologist (born 1941)

Paul Richard Wilson
- Born: 9 March 1941 (age 85); New Zealand
- Education: University of Canterbury University of Queensland
- Known for: Research into: Miscarriage of Justice; Australian Criminal justice system; Australian Policing
- Scientific career
- Fields: Criminology; Forensic Psychology; Sociology
- Workplaces: Australian Institute of Criminology Queensland University of Technology and Bond University

Paul Richard Wilson (born 9 March 1941) is a New Zealand-born Australian social scientist. He was convicted and jailed in 2016 on counts of indecent treatment of a child under 12 years.

== Biography ==
Wilson was born in New Zealand. He holds both B.A. and M.A.(Hons) degrees from the University of Canterbury, and an earned Ph.D. from the University of Queensland.

He has made contributions to the forensic investigation of criminological issues, Australian policing and the Australian criminal justice system. He has questioned the use of mandatory sentencing.

Wilson also has written critiques of societal and political issues including the ethics of Australia's involvement in the Iraq War, the casualties of the Iraq War and youth mental health.

Wilson has held academic appointments at the University of Canterbury, the Australian National University, the University of Queensland, the Australian Institute of Criminology, Queensland University of Technology, and Bond University and also has been a visiting fellow at Murdoch University, the University of Western Australia, Rutgers University in the United States, and Simon Fraser University in Canada. He also was a Fulbright Scholar. At Bond University, he held the Chair in Criminology for almost 20 years and was the Research Director of the Centre for Applied Psychology and Criminology. In addition, he was Dean of the Faculty of Humanities and Social Sciences for many years.

He has authored some 50 books and many book chapters in international handbooks as well as hundreds of peer-reviewed journal articles on crime and related social issues. He was an occasional columnist for several Australian newspapers and gave various radio and television interviews.

He was awarded the Medal of the Order of Australia (OAM) in the Australia Day Honours of 26 January 2003. His OAM was rescinded on 22 September 2017.

== Criminal convictions ==
In November 2012, Wilson was accused of child sex offences allegedly committed in the early 1970s. On 16 May 2014, he was committed to stand trial. He pleaded not guilty. On 23 November 2016, he was found guilty of four counts of indecent treatment of a child under 12 years. On 24 November 2016, he was sentenced to 18 months, suspended after serving six months.

== Bibliography ==
- The Police and the Public in Australia and New Zealand (with D. Chappell), University of Queensland Press, Brisbane (1969)
- The Sexual Dilemma: Abortion, Homosexuality, Prostitution and the Criminal Threshold, University of Queensland Press, Brisbane (1971) ISBN 0-7022-0704-7 ISBN 978-07022-0704-4
- The Policeman’s Position Today and Tomorrow: An Examination of the Police Force (with J.S. Western), University of Queensland Press, Brisbane (1972) ISBN 0-7022-0754-3 ISBN 978-07022-0754-9
- The Australian Criminal Justice System (with D. Chappell), Butterworths, Sydney (1972)
- Australian Social Issues: Perspectives for Social Action, Butterworths, Sydney (1972)
- Immigrants and Politics, Australian National University Press, Canberra (1973) ISBN 0-7081-0817-2 ISBN 978-070810-817-8
- Crime and the Community (with J. Brown,) University of Queensland Press, Brisbane (1973) ISBN 0-7022-0839-6 ISBN 978-07022-0839-3
- Deviance in Australia (with A. Hiller), Cheshire, Melbourne (1975)
- Social Deviance in Australia (with A.R. Edwards), Cheshire, Melbourne (1975)
- The Helping Professions in Australia: A Critical Appraisal (with A. Pemberton & P. Boreham), University of Queensland Press, Brisbane (1976) ISBN 0-7022-1173-7 ISBN 978-07022-1173-7
- Public Housing for Australia, University of Queensland Press, Brisbane (1976)
- Delinquency in Australia: A Critical Appraisal, University of Queensland Press, Brisbane (1977) ISBN 0-7022-1372-1 ISBN 978-0-70221-372-4
- Of Public Concern: Contemporary Australian Social Issues, University of Queensland Press, Brisbane (1977) ISBN 0-7022-1432-9 ISBN 978-07022-1432-5
- The Australian Criminal Justice System (with D. Chappell), (revised 2nd Edition), Butterworths, Sydney, (1977) ISBN 0-4094-3472-8 ISBN 978-040943-472-9
- Planning for Turbulent Environments (with J.S. Western), University of Queensland Press, Brisbane (1977) ISBN 0-7022-1442-6 ISBN 978-07022-1442-4
- The Other Side of Rape, University of Queensland Press, Brisbane (1978) ISBN 0-7022-1167-2 ISBN 978-07022-1167-6
- The Two Faces of Deviance (with J. Braithwaite), University of Queensland Press, Brisbane (1978) ISBN 0-7022-1326-8 ISBN 978-07022-1326-7
- Mental Disorder or Madness? Alternative Theories (with E.M. Bates), University of Queensland Press, Brisbane (1979) ISBN 0-7022-1389-6 ISBN 978-07022-1389-2
- Intimacy: A Sex or Love Experience?, Cassell Collier-Macmillan, Sydney (1979) ISBN 0-7269-9271-2 ISBN 978-07269-9271-1
- The Man They Called a Monster: Sexual Experiences Between Men and Boys, Cassell, Sydney (1981)
- Black Death, White Hands, Allen & Unwin, Sydney 1982 (revised editions 1985, 1988) ISBN 0-8686-1300-2 ISBN 978-08686-1300-0
- "Black Death White Hands Revisited: The Case of Palm Island". Aust. & NZ Journal of Criminology. 18: 49–57. March 1985. doi:10.1177/000486588501800106. S2CID 145409894.
- Murder of the Innocents: Child Killers and Their Victims, Rigby, Adelaide (1985) ISBN 0-7270-2034-X ISBN 978-07270-2034-5
- Street Kids (with J. Arnold), Dove Publications, Melbourne (1986)
- Australian Criminal Justice System: The Mid 1980s (with D. Chappell), Butterworths, Sydney (1986)
- Crime Prevention: Theory and Practice (with S. Geason), Australian Institute of Criminology, Canberra (1988) ISBN 0-6421-3557-6 ISBN 978-06421-3557-5
- Australian Policing: Contemporary Issues (with D. Chappell), Butterworths, Sydney (1989) ISBN 0-4094-9489-5 ISBN 978-04094-9489-1
- Designing Out Crime: Crime Prevention Through Environmental Design (with S. Geason), Australian Institute of Criminology, Canberra (1989) ISBN 0-6421-4307-2 ISBN 978-06421-4307-5
- Journalism and Justice: How Crime Is Reported (with P.N. Grabosky), Pluto Press, Sydney (1989)
- A Life of Crime, Scribe Publications, Melbourne (1990) ISBN 0-9080-1117-2 ISBN 978-09080-1117-9
- Preventing Car Theft and Crime in Car Parks (with S. Geason), Australian Institute of Criminology, Canberra (1990) ISBN 0-6421-4939-9 ISBN 978-06421-4939-8
- Preventing Graffiti and Vandalism (with S. Geason), Australian Institute of Criminology, Canberra (1990) ISBN 0-6421-4936-4 ISBN 978-06421-4936-7
- Young People and Crime: Costs and Prevention(with I.L. Potas & A. Vining), Australian Institute of Criminology, Canberra (1990) ISBN 0-6421-5538-0 ISBN 978-06421-5538-2
- Preventing Crime on Transport: Rail, Buses, Taxis, Planes (with P. Weiser Easteal), Australian Institute of Criminology, Canberra (1991) ISBN 0-6421-6609-9 ISBN 978-06421-6609-8
- Issues in Crime, Morality and Justice, Australian Institute of Criminology, Canberra (1992)
- Justice and Nightmares (with M. Brown), University of New South Wales Press, Sydney (1992) ISBN 0-8684-0061-0 ISBN 978-08684-0061-7
- The Australian Criminal Justice System: The Mid 1990s (with D. Chappell), Butterworths, Sydney (1994) ISBN 0-4093-0583-9 ISBN 978-04093-0583-8
- Australian Policing Contemporary Issues (2nd Edition) (with D. Chappell), Butterworths, Sydney (1996)
- Jean Lee: The Last Woman Hanged in Australia (with D. Treble & R. Lincoln), Random House, Sydney (1997) ISBN 0-0918-3442-2 ISBN 978-00918-3442-5
- Crime and the Criminal Justice System in Australia: 2000 and Beyond (with D. Chappell), Butterworths, Sydney (2000) ISBN 0-4093-1646-6 ISBN 978-04093-1646-9
- Murder in Tandem: When Two People Kill (with J.W. Simmonds), Harper Collins, Sydney (2000) ISBN 0-7322-6936-9 ISBN 978-07322-6936-4
- Justice in the Deep North: An Historical Perspective on Crime and Punishment in Queensland (with C. McCartney & R. Lincoln), (2003) ISBN 1-740970-31-4 ISBN 978-17409-7031-0
- Who killed Leanne? An Investigation into a Murder and Miscarriage of Justice (with G. Crowley), Zeus Publications, Gold Coast, Queensland (2005) ISBN 1-9210-0547-5
- Issues in Australian Crime and Criminal Justice (with D. Chappell). LexisNexis Butterworths, Sydney (2005) ISBN 0-409321-28-1 ISBN 978-04093-2128-9
- Who Killed Leanne Holland? One Girl's Murder and One Man's Injustice (with G. Crowley), New Holland Publishers, Sydney (2007) ISBN 978-1-741105-10-0
- Dead Bodies Don't Count: Civilian Casualties and the Forgotten Costs of the Iraq Conflict (with R. Hill), Zeus Publications, Gold Coast, Queensland (2007) ISBN 978-1-92124-051-5
- Five Drops of Blood: Murder in the Cat Protection Society, New Holland Publishers, Sydney (2008) ISBN 1-7411-0652-4 ISBN 978-17411-0652-7
- Predators: Killers Without a Conscience (with A. Howard), New Holland Publishers, Sydney (2009) ISBN 1-7411-0843-8 ISBN 978-17411-0843-9
- Erasing Iraq: The Human Costs of Carnage (with M. Otterman & R. Hill), Pluto Press, London & New York (2010) ISBN 0-7453-2898-9 ISBN 978-07453-2897-3

== See also ==
- Graham Stafford
