= Psychologists Board of Queensland =

Queensland State Government body

The Psychologists Board of Queensland is a Queensland State Government body empowered by State Legislation to regulate and manage the practice of Psychology in the State of Queensland. The Board derives its authority from the Psychologists Registration Act 2001, Psychologists Registration Regulation 2002 and the Health Practitioners (Professional Standards) Act 1999.
