= Interamerican Psychological Society =

Organization of psychologists in Western Hemisphere

Interamerican Society of Psychology/Sociedad Interamericana de Psicología
- Abbreviation: SIP
- Formation: 1951; 75 years ago
- Type: Learned society
- Official language: English, Spanish, French and Portuguese
- President: Viviane de Castro Pecanha
- Website: sipsych.org

The Interamerican Society of Psychology is the scientific and professional society that brings together the psychologists of the Americas. It is more commonly known by its Spanish title Sociedad Interamericana de Psicología (SIP). It is also known by its French title Société Interaméricaine de Psychologie. The organization's official languages are Spanish, English, Portuguese, and French.

The main objective of the SIP is to promote the exchange among psychologists of the Americas. The SIP has been recognized as a driving force for the growth of psychology in Latin America, and has facilitated the formation of other institutions, such as the International Association for Cross-Cultural Psychology (IACCP), the Latin American Association for Behavior Analysis and Modification (ALAMOC) or the Latin American Association of Social Psychology (ALAPSO). In order to achieve the central objective, three specific objectives were proposed:

- To provide a means of direct communication among psychologists and scientists in related fields in North, Central and South America and the Caribbean, and to promote the development of the behavioral sciences in the Western Hemisphere.
- To contribute to international understanding through a broader understanding of cultural differences and encounters across national boundaries.
- To help promote research and academic and professional exchange among the nations of the Americas.

Among its activities are the Interamerican Journal of Psychology, which accepts papers pertaining to any area of psychology and in the official languages of the SIP, which are Spanish, English, Portuguese and French; the Interamerican Congress of Psychology, which is held in different American countries and promotes the exchange of information on psychology or related topics; and the Regional Congress, which facilitates access to information for people who could not attend the Interamerican congresses, but on a regional basis. In addition, the SIP awards a student prize for the best research in psychology at the undergraduate and graduate levels to promote scientific research among students.

Every two years the SIP hosts the Interamerican Congress of Psychology (CIP) and the Regional Congress of Psychology (CR-SIP). Their first Interamerican Congress was celebrated in 1953 in Santo Domingo, Dominican Republic.

== History ==
It was founded in Mexico City in 1951 by a group of psychologists and psychiatrists including Eduardo Krapf, Werner Wolff, Oswaldo Robles, Jaime Barrios Peña, Rogelio Díaz-Guerrero, among others. The founders had attended the IV World Congress on Mental Health held at the facilities of the Mexican Institute of Social Security and at the Palace of Fine Arts in December of that same year. The SIP is a member of the International Union of Psychological Science (IUPsyS), a division of the International Council of Scientific Unions, which allows it to relate to international organizations such as UNESCO.

Since 1953, the SIP has organized Inter-American Congresses. The first one was held in Santo Domingo, Dominican Republic, from December 10 to 20, 1953, with the central theme “Cultures and Values in Psychology”, organized by Andrés Avelino García, with a registered attendance of 50 people. Currently, these congresses are held every two years and are of a generalist nature, insofar as they cover the main manifestations of the discipline. In addition to the Inter-American Congresses, since 2004, the Regional Congresses have been organized. The first one has taken place in Guatemala and the last one happened in June of 2024 in Arequipa, Peru.

Other relevant facts about the history of the SIP are the following:

- Since 1967, the Interamerican Journal of Psychology has been published, which publishes both theoretical and applied articles.
- The Interamerican Student Award was created in 1991 and was given to undergraduate and graduate students.
- Since 2007, to honor one of the SIP’s pioneers, it has been decided to rename the Interamerican Psychology Award for Hispanic and Portuguese speakers after Rogelio Díaz Guerrero.
- Some of the main personalities who have been part of the SIP’s General Committee are Martín-Baró, Rogelio Díaz Guerrero, Rubén Ardila, Harry Triandis, Isabel Lagunes, Aroldo Rodrigues and José Miguel Salazar, among others.

== Congresses ==
Congress	Date	Place	Assistants	Additional information
I	1953	Santo Domingo, República Dominicana	50	Organizer: Andrés Avelino García; Moddalities: presentation of research results, works of philosophical reflection on psychology, among others.
II	1954	Ciudad de México, México	200	Organizer: Guillermo Dávila
III	1955	Austin, Texas, USA	150	Organizer: Wayne Holtzman
IV	1956	San Juan, Puerto Rico	250	Organizer: Marion García
V	1957	Ciudad de México, México	350	Organizer: Rogelio Díaz Guerrero
VI	1959	Rio de Janeiro, Brasil	399	Organizer: Lourenco Filho
VII	1961	Ciudad de México, México	650	Organizer: Guillermo Dávila
VIII	1963	Mar del Plata, Argentina	600	Organizer: Fernanda Monasterio
IX	1964	Miami, Florida, USA	300	Organizer: Marshal Jones
X	1966	Lima, Perú	466	Organizer: Carlos Alberto Seguin
XI	1967	Ciudad de México, México	900	Organizer: Rogelio Díaz Guerrero
XII	30/03 to 06/04 1969	Montevideo, Uruguay	392	Organizer: Elida J. Tuana; Theme: Training, Specialization and Research in Psychology.; Modalities: symposiums, working groups, round tables, individual papers, among others.
XIII	18 to 22 of december, 1971	Ciudad Universitaria de la República de Panamá	700	Organizer: Carlos Malgrat: Thematic axes: Expectation and problems - Intercultural cooperation Studies on social psychology Learning difficulties and their remedies Studies in Latin America Studies on adolescence Studies on young children Studies on personality Experimental studies Trans-cultural studies; Modalities: symposia, individual papers
XIV	1973	São Paulo, Brasil	3072	Organizer: Arrigo Angelini
XV	14 to 19 of december, 1974	Bogotá, Colombia	2800	Organizer: José Antonio Sánchez; Thematic axes: Contemporary psychology Experimental and non-experimental psychology; Modalities: symposia, exhibition of works
XVI	12 to 17 of december, 1976	Miami, USA	720	Organizer: Gordon Finley; Thematic axes: Social Psychology Clinical Psychology Educational Psychology Developmental Psychology Psychometrics; Modalities: symposia, workshops, bicultural conversation hours, reviews and conferences.
XVII	1979	Lima, Perú	4000	Organizer: Reynaldo Alarcón
XVIII	1981	Santo Domingo, República Dominicana	1600	Organizer: Rolando Tabar
XIX	1983	Quito, Ecuador	2000	Organizer: Nelso Serrano
XX	7 to 12 of july, 1985	Caracas, Venezuela	2500	Organizer: José Miguel Salazar; Thematic areas: Social and Political Psychology History and Philosophy of Psychology Work Psychology Health Psychology; Modalities: conferences, symposia, round tables, thematic reviews.
XXI	28/06 to 03/07, 1987	La Habana, Cuba	1500	Organizer: Jorge Grau; Modalities: conferences, round tables, thematic sessions, workshops, among others
XXII	1989	Buenos Aires, Argenitna	2540	Organizer: Héctor Fernández Álvarez
XXIII	1991	San José, Costa Rica	2500	Organizer: Daniel Flores Mora
XXIV	4 to 9 of july, 1993	Santiago, Chile	2500	Organizer: Julio Villegas; Modalities: round tables, presentation of analyses, among others.
XXV	1995	San Juan, Puerto Rico	2000	Organizer: Irma Serrano García
XXVI	1997	São Paulo, Brasil	2200	Organizer: María Regina Maluf
XXVII	1999	Caracas, Venezuela	1800	Organizer: Maritza Montero
XXVIII	2001	Santiago, Chile	1500	Organizer: Antonio Mladinic
XXIX	2003	Lima, Perú	1700	Organizer: Cecilia Thorne
XXX	2005	Bueno Aires, Argenitna	3757	Organizer: Mario Molina
XXXI	July, 2007	Ciudad de México, México	1200	Organizer: Isabel Lagunes; Thematic axes: Pioneers of psychology in the Latin American context History of psychology in the field of health The relationship between religion and psychology The development of psychology laboratories in Latin America Particular reconstructions of modern psychological systems such as psychoanalysis and behaviorism.; Modalities: conferences, symposia, round tables, oral communications and book presentations.
XXXII	28/06 to 02/07, 2009	Universidad del Valle de la Ciudad de Guatemala	1700	Organizer: María del Pilar Gracioso; Theme: A Path to Peace and Democracy; Thematic axes: Health and quality of life Social violence and human rights Gender, political-legal constructs Effects and consequences of poverty Impact of disasters Education Training and evaluation Organizational and labor challenges
XXXIII	26 to 30 of june, 2011	Medellín, Colombia	2266	Organizer: Henry Castillo; Theme: For the health of the people: A psychology committed to social transformation.; Thematic axes: Neuroscience and psychobiology History Epistemology of psychology and basic psychology Psychology and human development Organizational psychology and institutions Psychology, conflict and social transformation Contemporary problems and trends in psychology.; Modalities: workshops, conferences, symposia, free papers, posters, round tables, book presentations.
XXXIV	2013	Brasilia, Brasil	1989	Organizer: Jairo Borges
XXXV	12 to 16 of july, 2015	Lima, Perú	1650	Organizer: Sheyla Blumen; Theme: 62 years building bridges
XXXVI	23 to 27 of july, 2017	Mérida, Yucatán		Organizer: Juana Juárez Romero; Theme: Inclusion and equity for the well-being of the Americas.; Thematic axes: From the past of the discipline towards new horizons in the search for fairer societies Subjects and psychological processes: bridging inequality gaps Social institutions, creative processes and minorities: generating strategies for inclusion and equity Inclusion and equity from the community, sexuality, law and the environment.; Modalities: symposiums, round tables, conferences, book presentations, posters, among others.
XXXVII	15 to 19 of july, 2019	La Habana, Cuba	1241	Organizer: Alexis Lorenzo Ruiz; Theme: Inter- and transdisciplinary psychology: Strengthening collaboration in the Americas.; Thematic areas: Epistemology, theory, methodology and history of psychology Experimental and comparative psychology Education, subjectivity and human development Gender studies Health and human welfare Psychology in organizations Community, social and political psychology Sports psychology Psychogerontology Neuropsychology Family Psychology Couples and sexuality Environmental and emergency and disaster psychology; Modalities: workshops and work groups
XXXVIII	26 to 28 of july, 2021	Virtual modality	696	Organizer: Carlos Zalaquett; Theme: Contributions of Psychology in the 21st Century; Thematic areas: Epistemology, theory, training and history of psychology Methodology Experimental and comparative psychology Education Developmental and evolutionary psychology Gender studies Health and human welfare Psychology in the workplace and organizations Community, social and political psychology Sports psychology Neuropsychology Sexuality studies Rural and environmental psychology Psychology, emergencies and disasters.; Modalities: round tables, symposia, free papers, posters, book presentations and workshops.
XLIX	26 to 30 of june, 2023	Asunción, Paraguay	1432	Organizer: Antonio Samaniego; Thematic axes: Rights, inclusion and disabilities Education Ethics Epistemology and history of psychology Gender studies Training in psychology Methodology of behavioral sciences Human mobility, migration and transnationality Neuroscience and neuropsychology Environmental psychology Health, clinical and hospital psychology Peace psychology Psychology of ethnic groups and cultural minorities Couple and family psychology Consumer psychology Sport psychology, Psychology of work and organizations Psychology in emergencies and disasters Evolutionary and developmental psychology Experimental and comparative psychology Legal psychology Political psychology Rural psychology Social and community psychology Psychology and new technologies Psychology and pandemics COVID-19 Psychology and sexuality; Modalities: conferences, workshops, symposia, round tables, panel discussions, book presentations, free papers, posters.
XL	14 to 18 of july, 2025	San Juan, Puerto Rico		Organizer: Antonio Puente; Theme: A Psychology for all the Americas

== SIP Structure ==
The SIP is centered in a Central Office where the main exchange of information regarding research, publications and opportunities related to psychology in the Americas takes place. The board of directors consists of the following officers: president, vice-president, executive secretaries, secretary general, treasurer, editor of the RIP, coordinator of the publishing imprint and student representative; in addition there are the president-elect and the outgoing president. Officers are elected by a vote of the entire membership. However, there are three positions that are not subject to voting. On the one hand, the secretaries are elected by the president; on the other hand, the two positions responsible for the imprint, i.e., the imprint coordinator and the editor of the RIP, are elected by an Ad Hoc committee appointed by the board, the committee evaluates, elects and decides, and the board rectifies. The positions have a duration of two years, with the exception of the positions responsible for the imprint, which last four years. The presidencies rotate by region (North America, Central America and South America), so that every six years the presidency is re-elected in the same region. In addition, the SIP has National Representatives and Delegates for each country in each region of the Americas, who serve as a liaison network with the Central Office.

== Task Forces ==
The Task Forces are another important area of development of the Society, in which its members, grouped by expertise, seek to promote areas of Psychology. Some of these are:

- History of Psychology
- Community Psychology
- Environmantal Psychology
- Clinical Psychology
- Rights, DIsability and Rare Diseases
- Psychology of Sports
- Psychology of Sexual Diversity
- Editors
- Educational Psychology
- Group of students
- Training in Psychology
- Ethics
- Assessment
- Experimental and Comparative Psychology
- Osychology of Gender
- Legal Psychology
- Policy Psychology
- Psychology of Health
- Organizational Psychology
- Violence, prevention and resilience

== Publications ==
=== Interamerican Journal of Psychology ===
The SIP publishes the Interamerican Journal of Psychology since 1967 with the purpose of reflecting the discoveries that are being carried out in the American continent, covering theory and practice. In this way, it seeks to promote both collaboration and communication among psychologists of the continent. The journal is published three times a year and in any official language of the SIP. The journal has single-blind peer review arbitration. It has a plagiarism detection system and abides by certain limitations in its publications since only a maximum of two articles can be processed with the participation of the same author and each author can only indicate one institution of affiliation for the signature of the articles, the other institutions must be listed in the author's note as other financing institutions. It also has a policy of open and immediate access to its content, since it is based on the principle that making research freely available to the public favors a greater global exchange of knowledge. In turn, it offers researchers the possibility of publishing their work free of charge. The journal also has a policy of open and immediate access to its content.

In 2017 a socio-bibliometric study was conducted on the first 50 publications of the journal in which its structure was observed and a citation concentration analysis and a conceptual analysis were performed. It was found that the structure up to that time was characterized by both diversity and frequent changes in its staff and scientific committee. In relation to the citation concentration analysis, the results showed that most of the articles and books referenced were mainly American on topics such as locus of control, social learning, and cross-cultural, social and community psychology. In addition, the central concepts were related to behavior and cognition, analyzed from experimental and psychometric methods based on American social psychology.

In the same year, a roadmap was drawn up to analyze the role of the journal in terms of trends in its publication, collaboration, use, and to draw its Editorial Effort Index and Internationalization Index. It was found that it had high standards of internationalization during the period analyzed, which was from 2005 to 2015.

=== SIP Bulletin ===
The SIP Bulletin is developed by members of the Board of Directors to highlight the work carried out by its members and thus maintain a link between the SIP and its membership. It is published at least once a year, although more than one bulletin may be published in a year and currently has 114 issues. The Bulletin includes the following:

- Cover article
- Letter from the president
- Briefs
- SIP world
