= Australian Counselling Association =

Non-profit professional organisation

- Headquarters: 34 Station Street Nundah QLD 4012
- CEO: Peta Pitcher
- Website: https://www.theaca.net.au/

The Australian Counselling Association (ACA) is the largest peak body for counsellors and psychotherapists in Australia, representing over 25,000 members. ACA leads the advancement of the counselling profession by providing recognised accreditation pathways, defining standards of ethical conduct, and promoting high standards in education and practice. Through ongoing training, employment opportunities and research, ACA supports its members’ professional growth, and advocates for the visibility and credibility of the counselling and psychotherapy profession. ACA is dedicated to shaping a trusted and capable workforce that supports individuals and communities across Australia.

== Mission ==
To advance and strengthen the counselling profession. To advocate for, support, and uphold the highest standards for counsellors in Australia, fostering a culture of quality care, accountability and continuous education.

== History ==
The Australian Counselling Association (ACA) was formed as a national association in 1998 to uphold high standards in counselling and psychotherapy. Today, ACA has evolved into the largest counselling and psychotherapy registration body in Australia.

ACA plays a vital role in supporting and advancing counselling and psychotherapy in Australia. It sets professional standards, accredits education providers, promotes ethical practice, and provides members with ongoing professional development opportunities. Through its Code of Conduct and Scope of Practice, ACA helps ensure a consistent, transparent and accountable framework for the profession.

Beyond regulatory functions, ACA promotes ongoing education and training, creates employment opportunities, and engages in research initiatives to enhance to counselling practices.

== International Affiliations ==
Internationally, ACA is recognised through its formal affiliations with peak bodies in various countries, including, Ireland, Canada, New Zealand, USA and the UK. ACA is also a member of the International Association of Counselling.

ACA holds recognition in global mental health aid efforts through Observer Member status with the World Health Organization's Inter-Agency Standing Committee Reference Group.

== Find a Counsellor Directory ==
The ACA established the Find A Counsellor Directory, an online service allowing the public to search and contact registered counsellors and psychotherapists. Users can search by Name, Location, Area of Interest, Language Spoken and more, supporting access to counselling services across Australia.

== Publishing ==
=== Australian Counselling Research Journal ===
The ACA publishes the Australian Counselling Research Journal (ACRJ), an open-access, peer-reviewed, online journal providing leadership in counselling and psychotherapy research. The journal promotes practitioner-driven quality research informing practitioners and educators, from the mental-health fields counselling and psychotherapy. ACRJ has been regularly published since 2005.

=== Counselling Australia Magazine ===
The ACA publishes the Counselling Australia Magazine, a digital magazine that provides trusted insights and thought-provoking articles from the counselling and psychotherapy field. In addition to expert insights and the latest trends and developments in the sector, Counselling Australia features book reviews, technology updates, counselling perspectives, opinion pieces, resources and interviews. Counselling Australia Magazine is published quarterly, every March, June, September and December.
