= Opinion polling for the 2027 New South Wales state election =

In the lead-up to the 2027 New South Wales state election, opinion polling has taken place to gauge voter sentiment of politics in New South Wales at various points in time. These opinion polls also gauge leader favourability.

== Graphical summary ==
Primary vote opinion polls with LOESS smoothening (as of 12 July 2026)

Two-party preferred opinion polls with LOESS smoothening (as of 12 July 2026)

=== Voting intention ===
==== Legislative Assembly ====
Date	Polling firm	Client	Sample size	Margin of error	Primary vote						2PP vote		
Date	Polling firm	Client	Sample size	Margin of error	ALP	L/NP	GRN	ONP	IND	Others	ALP	L/NP	ONP
4–11 November 2026	DemosAU/Premier National	—N/a	1,023	±3.9%	30%	24%	15%	22%	—N/a	9%	57%	43%	—N/a
6–10 Oct, 2–7 Nov 2026	Resolve (Note: Two-party preferred result estimated by Kevin Bonham.)	Sydney Morning Herald	1,100	—N/a	30%	23%	13%	26%	5%	3%	57.4%	42.6%	—N/a
9–15 Aug, 7–12 Sep 2026	Resolve	Sydney Morning Herald	1,650	—N/a	29%	24%	11%	25%	5%	5%	55.2%	44.8%	—N/a
19–26 August 2026	DemosAU/Premier National	—N/a	1,028	±3.9%	32%	25%	13%	23%	—N/a	7%	57%	43%	—N/a
5–12 Aug 2026	Insightfully	Minerals Council of Australia	1,000	—N/a	29%	18%	13%	29%	—N/a	—N/a	—N/a	—N/a	—N/a
12 July 2026	Resolve	Sydney Morning Herald	1,100	—N/a	29%	23%	11%	25%	8%	4%	55.6%	44.4%	—N/a
15–18 June 2026	DemosAU/Premier National	—N/a	1,038	±3.6%	32%	20%	13%	27%	—N/a	8%	59.7%	40.3%	—N/a
15–18 June 2026	DemosAU/Premier National	—N/a	1,038	±3.6%	32%	20%	13%	27%	—N/a	8%	56.2%	—N/a	43.8%
15–18 June 2026	DemosAU/Premier National	—N/a	1,038	±3.6%	32%	20%	13%	27%	—N/a	8%	—N/a	—N/a	—N/a
20 May 2026	Resolve	—N/a	1,000	—N/a	32%	26%	10%	22%	6%	4%	55%	45%	—N/a
9–14 Mar 2026	Resolve	Sydney Morning Herald	1,100	—N/a	29%	25%	10%	23%	8%	5%	52.8%	47.2%	—N/a
24 Feb–4 Mar 2026	DemosAU/Premier National	—N/a	1,032	±3.6%	34%	23%	15%	21%	—N/a	7%	61%	39%	—N/a
16–19 Feb 2026	Roy Morgan	—N/a	2,108	—N/a	25%	19%	12.5%	30%	2.5%	11%	54%	46%	—N/a
16–19 Feb 2026	Roy Morgan	—N/a	2,108	—N/a	25%	19%	12.5%	30%	2.5%	11%	52.5%	—N/a	47.5%
16–19 Feb 2026	Roy Morgan	—N/a	2,108	—N/a	25%	19%	12.5%	30%	2.5%	11%	—N/a	50.5%	49.5%
17 Jan 2026	Resolve (Note: Two-party-preferred result estimated by William Bowe of The Poll Bludger.)	Sydney Morning Herald	1,145	—N/a	37%	27%	10%	—N/a	11%	15%	60%	40%	—N/a
14 Dec 2025	Spectre Strategy	—N/a	—N/a	—N/a	34%	26%	11%	16%	—N/a	13%	56%	44%	—N/a
24 Nov–8 Dec 2025	Redbridge/Accent	Daily Telegraph	1,293	—N/a	38%	30%	10%	4%	—N/a	18%	57%	43%	—N/a
21 Nov 2025	Kellie Sloane becomes Liberal leader and leader of the opposition												
9 Nov 2025	Resolve	Sydney Morning Herald	1,145	—N/a	37%	28%	10%	—N/a	15%	11%	58.5%	41.5%	—N/a
17–22 Oct 2025	DemosAU/Premier National	—N/a	1,016	±4.0%	37%	30%	13%	—N/a	—N/a	20%	59%	41%	—N/a
9–13 Sep 2025	Resolve	Sydney Morning Herald	—N/a	—N/a	38%	28%	10%	—N/a	11%	12%	59%	41%	—N/a
13–18 Jul 2025	Resolve	Sydney Morning Herald	1,054	—N/a	38%	32%	13%	—N/a	8%	10%	57%	43%	—N/a
June 2025	Redbridge/Accent	Australian Financial Review	—N/a	—N/a	43%	32%	—N/a	—N/a	—N/a	—N/a	58.5%	41.5%	—N/a
Mar–14 Apr 2025	Resolve	Sydney Morning Herald	1,123	—N/a	33%	36%	11%	—N/a	14%	6%	51%	49%	—N/a
18–23 Feb 2025	Resolve	Sydney Morning Herald	—N/a	—N/a	29%	38%	14%	—N/a	11%	8%	49%	51%	—N/a
8 Dec 2024	Resolve	Sydney Morning Herald	—N/a	—N/a	33%	37%	11%	—N/a	13%	7%	—N/a	—N/a	—N/a
6–20 Nov 2024	RedBridge/Accent	Australian Financial Review	1,088	±3.4%	37%	41%	9%	—N/a	13%	—N/a	50.5%	49.5%	—N/a
Sep–Oct 2024	Resolve	Sydney Morning Herald	1,111	—N/a	32%	37%	11%	—N/a	14%	6%	50%	50%	—N/a
6–29 Aug 2024	Wolf & Smith	—N/a	—N/a	±2.2%	32%	38%	12%	—N/a	14%	4%	50%	50%	—N/a
11 Aug 2024	Resolve	Sydney Morning Herald	1,000	—N/a	30%	38%	12%	—N/a	14%	6%	49%	51%	—N/a
16 Jun 2024	Resolve	Sydney Morning Herald	1,000	—N/a	32%	35%	11%	—N/a	15%	7%	52%	48%	—N/a
Feb–May 2024	RedBridge/Accent	Daily Telegraph	1,376	—N/a	35%	40%	11%	—N/a	—N/a	14%	50.5%	49.5%	—N/a
21 Mar – 21 Apr 2024	Resolve (Note: Includes two-party preferred result estimate.)	—N/a	1,000	—N/a	33%	36%	12%	—N/a	14%	5%	52%	48%	—N/a
25 Feb 2024	Resolve	Sydney Morning Herald	1,035	—N/a	34%	38%	12%	—N/a	12%	5%	51.5%	48.5%	—N/a
11 Nov 2023	Resolve	Sydney Morning Herald	1,100	—N/a	36%	32%	13%	—N/a	12%	7%	57%	43%	—N/a
10 Sep 2023	Resolve	Sydney Morning Herald	1,019	—N/a	38%	36%	9%	—N/a	13%	4%	54%	46%	—N/a
16 Jul 2023	Resolve	Sydney Morning Herald	1,012	—N/a	41%	32%	10%	—N/a	11%	5%	58%	42%	—N/a
14 May 2023	Resolve	Sydney Morning Herald	1,102	—N/a	44%	31%	9%	—N/a	10%	5%	60%	40%	—N/a
25 Mar 2023	2023 election				37.0%	35.4%	9.7%	1.8%	8.8%	9.2%	54.3%	45.7%	—N/a

==== Legislative Council ====
Date	Polling firm	Client	Sample size	Margin of error	Primary vote									
Date	Polling firm	Client	Sample size	Margin of error	ALP	L/NP	GRN	ONP	LCA	LBT	SFF	AJP	FFP	Others
19–26 August 2026	DemosAU/Premier National	—N/a	1,038	±3.9%	31%	25%	14%	24%	2%	—N/a	1%	1%	1%	1% (Note: 1% for Independents.)
15–18 June 2026	DemosAU/Premier National	—N/a	1,038	±3.8%	30%	20%	13%	27%	1%	—N/a	—N/a	1%	1%	8% (Note: 1% for the Citizens Party, 1% for Rod Roberts (independent), 1% for Tania Mihailuk (independent), 1% for Taylor Martin (independent), 1% for the HEART Party, 1% for the Australian Christians and 1% for The Small Business Party.)
24 Feb–4 Mar 2026	DemosAU/Premier National	—N/a	1,032	±3.6%	29%	21%	13%	21%	2%	1%	1%	1%	2%	8% (Note: 2% for the Citizens Party, 1% for the HEART Party, 1% for the Public Education, 1% for Socialist Alliance, 1% for Sustainable Australia, 1% for the Australian Christians, 1% for The Small Business Party, 0% for Josh for NSW, 0% for NSW Soc, 0% for Rod Roberts (independent), 0% for Tania Mihailuk (independent), 0% for Taylor Martin (independent) and 0% for The Rural Party.)
17–22 Oct 2025	DemosAU/Premier National	—N/a	1,016	±4.0%	30%	21%	13%	15%	3%	2%	1%	3%	5%	7% (Note: 1% for the HEART Party, 1% for the Public Education, 1% for Rod Roberts (independent), 1% for Socialist Alliance, 1% for Sustainable Australia, 1% for Tania Mihailuk (independent) and 1% for The Small Business Party.)
25 Mar 2023	2023 election				36.6%	29.8%	9.1%	5.9%	3.7%	3.5%	3.1%	2.2%	1.3%	4.8%

=== Preferred premier ===
Date	Polling firm	Client	Better Premier				
Date	Polling firm	Client	Minns	Sloane	Newman	Don't know	Net
4–11 Nov 2026	DemosAU/Premier National	—N/a	37%	24%	17%	22%	13%
6–10 Oct, 2–7 Nov	Resolve	Sydney Morning Herald	30%	12%	11%	47%	7%
9–15 Aug, 7–12 Sep	Resolve	Sydney Morning Herald	27%	15%	8%	50%	4%
28 Aug 2026	Mike Newman becomes leader of One Nation New South Wales						
19–26 Aug 2026	DemosAU/Premier National	—N/a	44%	26%	—N/a	30%	18%
12 July 2026	Resolve	Sydney Morning Herald	36%	16%	—N/a	48%	20%
21 May 2026	Resolve	—N/a	38%	18%	—N/a	44%	20%
9–14 Mar 2026	Resolve	Sydney Morning Herald	38%	17%	—N/a	45%	21%
24 Feb – 4 Mar 2026	DemosAU/Premier National	—N/a	48%	24%	—N/a	28%	24%
16–19 Feb 2026	Roy Morgan	—N/a	60.5%	31.5%	—N/a	8% (Note: Don't know or nominated someone else.)	29%
17 Jan 2026	Resolve	Sydney Morning Herald	40%	18%	—N/a	42%	22%
14 Dec 2025	Spectre Strategy	—N/a	41%	26%	—N/a	33% (Note: Includes 19% for "Neither".)	15%
21 Nov 2025	Kellie Sloane becomes Liberal leader and leader of the opposition						
Date	Polling firm	Client					
Date	Polling firm	Client	Minns	Speakman	—N/a	Don't know	Net
9 Nov 2025	Resolve	Sydney Morning Herald	31%	19%	—N/a	50%	12%
17–22 Oct 2025	DemosAU/Premier National	—N/a	44%	25%	—N/a	31%	19%
9–13 Sep 2025	Resolve	Sydney Morning Herald	37%	16%	—N/a	47%	21%
13–18 Jul 2025	Resolve	Sydney Morning Herald	35%	16%	—N/a	49%	19%
Mar–22 Apr 2025	Resolve	Sydney Morning Herald	40%	15%	—N/a	45%	25%
24–26 Mar 2025	DemosAU/Premier National	—N/a	42%	24%	—N/a	34%	18%
23 Feb 2025	Resolve	Sydney Morning Herald	35%	14%	—N/a	51%	21%
6 Oct 2024	Resolve	Sydney Morning Herald	37%	14%	—N/a	49%	23%
11 Aug 2024	Resolve	Sydney Morning Herald	38%	13%	—N/a	49%	25%
16 Jun 2024	Resolve	Sydney Morning Herald	38%	13%	—N/a	49%	25%
21 Apr 2024	Resolve	—N/a	37%	16%	—N/a	47%	19%
25 Feb 2024	Resolve	Sydney Morning Herald	35%	16%	—N/a	51%	19%
5 Nov 2023	Resolve	Sydney Morning Herald	35%	13%	—N/a	52%	22%
10 Sep 2023	Resolve	Sydney Morning Herald	41%	14%	—N/a	45%	27%
16 Jul 2023	Resolve	Sydney Morning Herald	39%	12%	—N/a	49%	27%
14 May 2023	Resolve	Sydney Morning Herald	42%	12%	—N/a	46%	30%

=== Leader satisfaction ===
Date	Polling firm	Client	Minns				Sloane				Newman						
Date	Polling firm	Client	Satisfied	Dissatisfied	Don't know	Net	Satisfied	Dissatisfied	Don't know	Net	Satisfied	Dissatisfied	Don't know	Net			
Date	Polling firm	Client	4–11 Nov 2026	DemosAU/Premier National	—N/a	34%	23%	43%	+11%	27%	18%	55%	+9%	22%	35%	43%	-13%
Date	Polling firm	Client	28 Aug 2026	Mike Newman becomes Leader of One Nation NSW													
19–26 Aug 2026	DemosAU/Premier National	—N/a	37%	22%	41%	+15%	25%	20%	55%	+5%	—N/a	—N/a	—N/a	—N/a			
16–19 Feb 2026	Roy Morgan	—N/a	56%	41%	3%	+15%	46%	45%	9%	+1%	—N/a	—N/a	—N/a	—N/a			
21 Nov 2025	Kellie Sloane becomes Liberal leader and leader of the opposition																
Date	Polling firm	Client	Minns				Speakman										
Date	Polling firm	Client	Satisfied	Dissatisfied	Don't know	Net	Satisfied	Dissatisfied	Don't know	Net	—N/a	—N/a	—N/a	—N/a			
Feb – May 2024	RedBridge/Accent	—N/a	40%	20%	40%	+20%	19%	21%	60%	-2%	—N/a	—N/a	—N/a	—N/a			

=== By language ===
==== Only English spoken at home ====
Date	Polling firm	Client	Sample size	Primary vote						2PP vote	
Date	Polling firm	Client	Sample size	ALP	L/NP	GRN	ONP	IND	Others	ALP	L/NP
19–26 August 2026	DemosAU/Premier National	—N/a	—N/a	29%	25%	12%	27%	—N/a	7%	—N/a	—N/a
15–18 June 2026	DemosAU/Premier National	—N/a	—N/a	29%	20%	11%	31%	—N/a	9%	—N/a	—N/a

==== Other language spoken at home ====
Date	Polling firm	Client	Sample size	Primary vote						2PP vote	
Date	Polling firm	Client	Sample size	ALP	L/NP	GRN	ONP	IND	Others	ALP	L/NP
19–26 August 2026	DemosAU/Premier National	—N/a	—N/a	43%	23%	17%	10%	—N/a	7%	—N/a	—N/a
15–18 June 2026	DemosAU/Premier National	—N/a	—N/a	43%	20%	19%	12%	—N/a	6%	—N/a	—N/a

=== Electorate polling ===
Date	Polling firm	Client	Sample size	Margin of error	Primary vote					2CP vote	
Date	Polling firm	Client	Sample size	Margin of error	ALP	L/NP	GRN	ONP	Others	ALP	ONP
29 Sep–16 Oct 2026 (Note: Federal seats in the Central Coast, Hunter, including Newcastle, Hunter, Paterson, Shortland, Dobell and Robertson, and the southern part of Lyne)	Pureprofile	Advent Energy	1,029	3%	32.1%	14.2%	16.2%	32%	—N/a	—N/a	—N/a
Early August 2026 (Note: Opinion poll was conducted in Cessnock)	Private	—N/a	—N/a	—N/a	24%	—N/a	—N/a	50%	—N/a	33%	67%

== See also ==
- Candidates of the 2027 New South Wales state election
