= William Dickson (Australian politician) =

English-born Australian politician

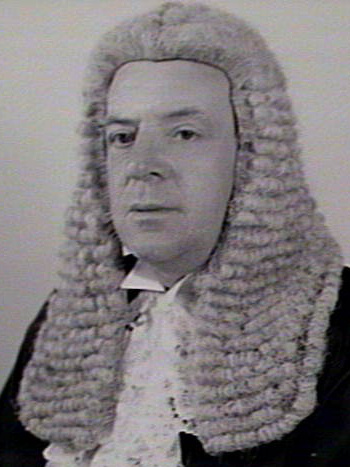

12th President of the New South Wales Legislative Council
- In office 18 August 1952 – 22 May 1966
- Deputy: Thomas Steele; Ernest Gerard Wright
- Preceded by: Ernest Farrar
- Succeeded by: Harry Budd

NSW Minister for Building Materials
- In office 9 March 1948 – 15 August 1952
- Premier: Jim McGirr; Joseph Cahill
- Preceded by: Claude Matthews
- Succeeded by: Portfolio abolished

NSW Minister for Secondary Industries
- In office 30 June 1950 – 15 August 1952
- Premier: Jim McGirr; Joseph Cahill
- Preceded by: Portfolio created
- Succeeded by: Portfolio abolished

NSW Secretary for Mines
- In office 21 September 1949 – 30 June 1950
- Premier: Jim McGirr
- Preceded by: Jim McGirr
- Succeeded by: Joshua Arthur

Member of the New South Wales Legislative Council
- In office 23 December 1925 – 22 April 1934
- Appointed by: Sir Dudley de Chair
- In office 23 April 1934 – 22 May 1966
- Succeeded by: Norman Boland

Personal details
- Born: 26 April 1893 Widnes, Lancashire, England
- Died: 22 May 1966 (aged 73) Vaucluse, New South Wales, Australia
- Party: NSW Labor; Lang Labor; Industrial Labor Party
- Education: Farnworth Grammar

William Edward Dickson (26 April 1893 – 22 May 1966) was an English-born Australian politician.

== Early life ==
Dickson was born at Widnes in Lancashire to alkali labourer Edward Dickson and Bertha Stancliffe. He migrated to Australia in 1913 and worked as an accountant for a mine in Broken Hill. He lost his job after opposing conscription during World War I, and worked as a labourer and then as manager of the Barrier Daily Truth. On 22 October 1922 he married Alice Celia Cogan, with whom he had five children.

== Political career ==
He then moved to Sydney, and from 1925 to 1934 was a Labor member of the New South Wales Legislative Council. Involved in Bob Heffron's Industrial Labor Party, he soon returned to the ALP and was general secretary from 1940 to 1941 and campaign director from 1940 to 1952. He returned to the Legislative Council in 1940, where he would remain until his death. He was an assistant minister from 1941 to 1948, and from 1948 to 1952 was Minister for Building Materials, with his title changed to include additional responsibilities as Minister for Secondary Industries from 1950. In 1949 he was appointed Secretary for Mines in addition to his previous portfolios. He resigned from the ministry in 1952 when he was elected President of the Legislative Council. He retained the presidency until his death at Vaucluse in 1966.

Parliament of New South Wales
Political offices
| Preceded by Claude Matthews | Minister for Building Materials; 1948–1952 | Portfolio abolished |
| New portfolio | Minister for Secondary Industries; 1950–1952 | Portfolio abolished |
| Preceded by Jim McGirr | Secretary for Mines; 1949–1950 | Succeeded by Joshua Arthur |
New South Wales Legislative Council
| Preceded by Ernest Farrar | President of the NSW Legislative Council; 1952–1966 | Succeeded by Harry Budd |
Party political offices
| Preceded by Walter Evans | General Secretary of the NSW Labor Party; 1940–1941 | Succeeded by John Stewart |
