= Ernest Gerard Wright =

Australian politician

The Honourable Ernie Wright
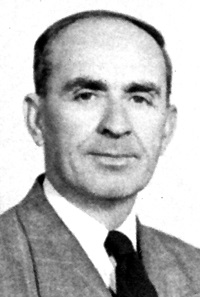

Chairman of Committees
- In office 11 March 1953 – 22 April 1967
- President: William Dickson; Sir Harry Budd
- Preceded by: Thomas Steele
- Succeeded by: Stanley Eskell

Member of the Legislative Council of New South Wales
- In office 23 April 1943 – 16 April 1973

Mayor of Newtown
- In office 27 July 1948 – 31 December 1948
- Preceded by: Reuben Sidney Goddard
- Succeeded by: Council abolished
- Constituency: Kingston Ward

Personal details
- Born: 10 July 1901 Tingha, New South Wales, Australia
- Died: 16 January 1981 (aged 73) Sydney, New South Wales, Australia
- Spouse: Vera Herford

Ernest Gerard "Ernie" Wright, (10 July 1901 – 16 January 1981) was an Australian politician. He was a member of the New South Wales Legislative Council for the Australian Labor Party (New South Wales Branch) for 29 years from 1943 to 1973 and also served as Chairman of Committees from 1953 to 1967. He also served as an Alderman on Newtown Municipal Council from 1944 to 1948, including from July to December as Mayor, being the last holder of that office before the council's amalgamation with the City of Sydney.

Civic offices
Preceded by Reuben Sidney Goddard	Mayor of Newtown; 1948	Council abolished
New South Wales Legislative Council
Preceded by Thomas Steele	Chairman of Committees; 1953–1967	Succeeded by Stanley Eskell
Party political offices
Preceded by John Stewart	General Secretary of the Australian Labor Party (NSW Branch); 1950–1952	Succeeded by Charles Wilson Anderson
