= President of the New South Wales Legislative Council =

Parliamentary presiding officer

- Incumbent; Ben Franklin since 9 May 2023
- Style: The Honourable; Mr / Madam President (in the Council)
- Appointer: The Monarch's representative at the behest of the Legislative Council
- Term length: Elected at start of each Parliament
- Precursor: Speaker of the Legislative Council
- Inaugural holder: Sir Alfred Stephen
- Formation: 20 May 1856
- Deputy: Rod Roberts

The President of the New South Wales Legislative Council is the presiding officer of the upper house of the Parliament of New South Wales, the Legislative Council. The presiding officer of the lower house is the speaker of the Legislative Assembly. The role of President has generally been a partisan office, filled by the governing party of the time. As of May 2023, the president is Ben Franklin.

== Election ==
Between 1856 and when the Legislative Council was re-constituted in 1934 the president was appointed by the Governor. From 1934 the President was chosen by the council, however there was no contested election between 1934 and 1988. Instead each of Sir John Peden, Ernest Farrar, William Dickson and Sir Harry Budd continued to hold office until they ceased to be a member of the council, regardless of the composition of the council or which party was in government. In 1991 this was changed by legislation that required the president to be chosen by ballot after each election. Since 1991 the president is elected by the Council in a secret ballot. The Clerk of the Council conducts the election. Since that time the Presidency has been a partisan office and the nominee of the government party has nearly always been elected—although this cannot be guaranteed since the government of the day does not necessarily have a majority in the Council. The president is assisted by an elected deputy president, who is currently Rod Roberts.

== Impartiality ==
The president has a casting vote (in the event of an equality of votes). Like the Speaker, typically the President continues to attend party meetings and at general elections stands as a party candidate. On the other hand, the President does not usually take part in debates in the Council and does not speak in public on party-political issues. The President is expected to conduct the business of the Council in an impartial and dignified manner.

Section 22I of the NSW Constitution states that "All questions arising in the Legislative Council shall be decided by a majority of the votes of the Members present other than the President or other Member presiding and when the votes are equal the President or other Member presiding shall have a casting vote."

== Role ==
The president’s principal duty is to preside over the Council, although the president is assisted in this by the deputy president and a panel of acting deputy presidents, who usually preside during routine debates. The occupant of the chair must maintain order in the Council, uphold the Standing Orders (rules of procedure) and protect the rights of backbench councillors. The president, in conjunction with the speaker of the Legislative Assembly, also administers Parliament House, Sydney, with the assistance of administrative staff.

Although the president does not have the same degree of disciplinary power as the speaker does, the Council is not as rowdy as most Australian legislative chambers, and thus his or her disciplinary powers are seldom exercised.

== Perquisites and ceremony ==
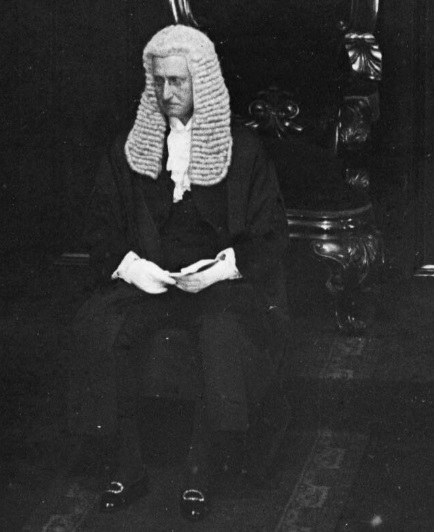
Sir John Peden (1929–1946) in the full traditional dress presiding over the State Opening of Parliament, 18 September 1929.

Following the Westminster tradition inherited from the House of Lords of the United Kingdom, the traditional dress of the speaker includes components of Court dress such as the black silk lay-type gown (similar to a Queen's Counsel gown), a wing collar and a lace jabot or bands (another variation included a white bow tie with a lace jabot), bar jacket, and a full-bottomed wig.

The dress of speakers has often variated according to the party in power, but is determinate on the personal choice of the speaker. Most Labor party presidents eschewed the wig while retaining the court dress, while conservative and independent speakers tended to wear the full dress.

The president, currently, no longer wears the full traditional court dress outfit. Max Willis (1991-1998) was the last president to do so. From 1998 to 2011, all the presidents opted not to wear any dress at all, preferring normal business attire. However, upon his election, President Harwin returned to tradition by wearing the gown during question time and on significant occasions such as the Opening of Parliament. However, there is nothing stopping any given speaker, if they choose to do so, from assuming traditional court dress or anything they deem appropriate.

== List of presidents of the Legislative Council ==
| # | President | Party | Term start | Term end | Time in office |
|---|---|---|---|---|---|
| | Alexander Macleay (Note: As Speaker of the unicameral Legislative Council prior to responsible government.) | None | 1 August 1843 | 19 May 1846 | 2 years, 291 days |
| | Charles Nicholson | None | 19 May 1846 | 29 February 1856 | 9 years, 286 days |
| 1 | Sir Alfred Stephen | None | 20 May 1856 | 28 January 1857 | 253 days |
| 2 | John Plunkett | None | 29 January 1857 | 6 February 1858 | 1 year, 8 days |
| 3 | Sir William Burton | None | 9 February 1858 | 10 March 1861 | 3 years, 29 days |
| 4 | William Wentworth | None | 24 June 1861 | 10 October 1862 | 1 year, 108 days |
| 5 | Sir Terence Murray | None | 14 October 1862 | 22 June 1873 | 10 years, 251 days |
| 6 | Sir John Hay | None | 8 July 1873 | 10 January 1892 | 18 years, 186 days |
| 7 | Sir John Lackey | None | 26 January 1892 | 23 May 1903 | 11 years, 117 days |
| 8 | Sir Francis Suttor | Progressive | 23 May 1903 | 4 April 1915 | 11 years, 316 days |
| 8 | Sir Francis Suttor | Liberal Reform | 23 May 1903 | 4 April 1915 | 11 years, 316 days |
| 9 | Fred Flowers | Labor | 27 April 1915 | 14 December 1928 | 13 years, 231 days |
| 9 | Fred Flowers | Independent Labor | 27 April 1915 | 14 December 1928 | 13 years, 231 days |
| 10 | Sir John Peden | Nationalist | 5 February 1929 | 22 April 1946 | 17 years, 76 days |
| 10 | Sir John Peden | United Australia | 5 February 1929 | 22 April 1946 | 17 years, 76 days |
| 10 | Sir John Peden | Liberal | 5 February 1929 | 22 April 1946 | 17 years, 76 days |
| 11 | Ernest Farrar | Liberal | 30 April 1946 | 16 June 1952 | 6 years, 47 days |
| 12 | William Dickson | Labor | 18 August 1952 | 22 May 1966 | 13 years, 277 days |
| 13 | Sir Harry Budd | Country | 9 August 1966 | 5 November 1978 | 12 years, 88 days |
| 14 | Johno Johnson (Note: Removed from office by a vote of the house.) | Labor | 7 November 1978 | 3 July 1991 | 12 years, 238 days |
| 15 | Max Willis | Liberal | 3 July 1991 | 29 June 1998 | 6 years, 361 days |
| 16 | Virginia Chadwick | Liberal | 29 June 1998 | 5 March 1999 | 249 days |
| 17 | Meredith Burgmann | Labor | 11 May 1999 | 2 March 2007 | 7 years, 295 days |
| 18 | Peter Primrose | Labor | 8 May 2007 | 17 November 2009 | 2 years, 193 days |
| 19 | Amanda Fazio | Labor | 24 November 2009 | 3 May 2011 | 1 year, 160 days |
| 20 | Don Harwin | Liberal | 3 May 2011 | 30 January 2017 | 5 years, 272 days |
| 21 | John Ajaka | Liberal | 21 February 2017 | 24 March 2021 | 4 years, 30 days |
| 22 | Matthew Mason-Cox | Liberal | 4 May 2021 | 9 May 2023 | 2 years, 5 days |
| 23 | Ben Franklin | National | 9 May 2023 | Incumbent | 3 years, 187 days |

== Deputy President and Chair of Committees ==
Originally titled Chairman of Committees, the current style was adopted on 5 May 2004 during the term of the first female holder of the office. Various legal and constitutional amendments to follow this change were made in the Constitution Amendment (Parliamentary Presiding Officers) Act 2014.

| Title | Chairman of Committees | Party | Term start | Term end | Time in office |
|---|---|---|---|---|---|
| Chairman of Committees | George Allen | None | 4 June 1856 | 15 January 1873 | 16 years, 225 days |
| Chairman of Committees | Joseph Docker | None | 15 January 1873 | 9 February 1875 | 2 years, 25 days |
| Chairman of Committees | Sir Joseph Innes | None | 9 February 1875 | 16 December 1880 | 5 years, 311 days |
| Chairman of Committees | Joseph Docker | None | 16 December 1880 | 11 December 1884 | 3 years, 361 days |
| Chairman of Committees | William Piddington | None | 17 March 1885 | 25 November 1887 | 2 years, 253 days |
| Chairman of Committees | Archibald Jacob | None | 1 December 1887 | 28 May 1900 | 12 years, 178 days |
| Chairman of Committees | William Trickett | None | 13 June 1900 | 23 July 1912 | 12 years, 40 days |
| Chairman of Committees | Broughton O'Conor | Liberal Reform | 24 July 1912 | 22 April 1934 | 21 years, 272 days |
| Chairman of Committees | Broughton O'Conor | Nationalist | 24 July 1912 | 22 April 1934 | 21 years, 272 days |
| Chairman of Committees | Broughton O'Conor | United Australia | 24 July 1912 | 22 April 1934 | 21 years, 272 days |
| Chairman of Committees | Ernest Farrar | United Australia | 2 May 1934 | 22 April 1946 | 11 years, 355 days |
| Chairman of Committees | Ernest Farrar | Liberal | 2 May 1934 | 22 April 1946 | 11 years, 355 days |
| Chairman of Committees | Thomas Steele | Country | 30 April 1946 | 11 March 1953 | 6 years, 315 days |
| Chairman of Committees | Ernest Wright | Labor | 11 March 1953 | 22 April 1967 | 14 years, 42 days |
| Chairman of Committees | Stanley Eskell | Liberal | 2 August 1967 | 6 March 1969 | 1 year, 216 days |
| Chairman of Committees | Thomas McKay | Liberal | 12 March 1969 | 5 November 1978 | 9 years, 238 days |
| Chairman of Committees | Clive Healey | Labor | 8 November 1978 | 22 February 1988 | 9 years, 106 days |
| Chairman of Committees | Sir Adrian Solomons | National | 28 April 1988 | 2 July 1991 | 3 years, 65 days |
| Chairman of Committees | Duncan Gay | National | 3 July 1991 | 10 May 1999 | 7 years, 311 days |
| Chairman of Committees | Tony Kelly | Labor | 11 May 1999 | 29 April 2003 | 3 years, 353 days |
| Chairman of Committees | Amanda Fazio | Labor | 30 April 2003 | 5 May 2004 | 6 years, 208 days |
| Deputy President | Amanda Fazio | Labor | 5 May 2004 | 24 November 2009 | 6 years, 208 days |
| Deputy President | Kayee Griffin | Labor | 24 November 2009 | 4 March 2011 | 1 year, 100 days |
| Deputy President | Jenny Gardiner | National | 3 May 2011 | 5 May 2015 | 4 years, 2 days |
| Deputy President | Trevor Khan | National | 5 May 2015 | 6 January 2022 | 6 years, 246 days |
| Deputy President | Wes Fang | National | 22 March 2022 | 9 May 2023 | 1 year, 48 days |
| Deputy President | Rod Roberts | One Nation | 9 May 2023 | 22 August 2023 | 3 years, 187 days |
| Deputy President | Rod Roberts | Independent | 22 August 2023 | Incumbent | 3 years, 187 days |

=== Assistant President ===
| Assistant President | Party | Term start | Term end | Time in office |
|---|---|---|---|---|
| Fred Nile | Christian Democrats | 28 June 2007 | 7 May 2019 | 11 years, 313 days |
| Shaoquett Moselmane | Labor | 7 May 2019 | 6 April 2020 | 335 days |
| Rod Roberts | One Nation | 17 June 2020 | 9 May 2023 | 2 years, 326 days |
| Peter Primrose | Labor | 9 May 2023 | Incumbent | 3 years, 187 days |
