= John Peden (politician) =

Australian politician (1871–1946)

The Honourable Sir John Peden KCMG KC
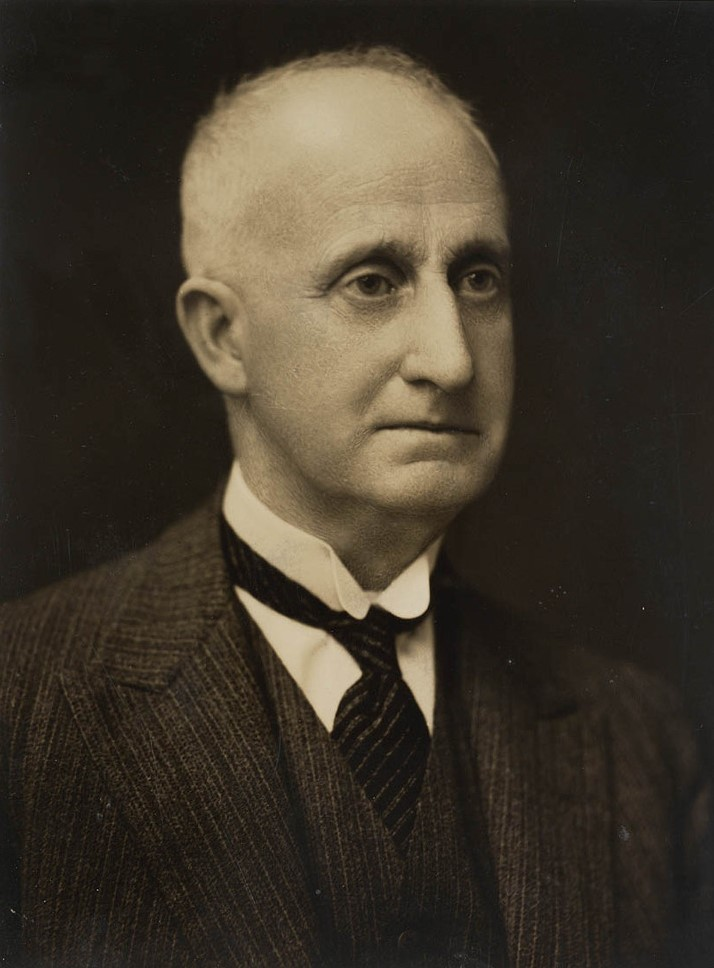

President of the Legislative Council
- In office 5 February 1929 – 22 April 1946
- Deputy: Broughton O'Conor; Ernest Farrar
- Preceded by: Frederick Flowers
- Succeeded by: Ernest Farrar

Member of the Legislative Council of New South Wales
- In office 17 July 1917 – 22 April 1946
- Appointed by: Sir Gerald Strickland

Personal details
- Born: 26 April 1871 Randwick, New South Wales
- Died: 31 May 1946 (aged 75) Paddington, New South Wales
- Spouse: Margaret Ethel Maynard (1904–1928; her death)
- Relations: David Peden (Grandfather); Magnus Peden (Father)
- Children: Margaret Elizabeth Maynard Peden; Barbara Constance Wyburn Peden

Sir John Beverley Peden KCMG KC (26 April 1871 – 31 May 1946) was an Australian jurist and politician. Born in Randwick to farmer Magnus Jackson Peden, a mayor of Randwick, and Elizabeth Neathway Brown, he attended public school at Bega before studying at Sydney Grammar School and the University of Sydney, where he received a Bachelor of Arts in 1892 and a Bachelor of Laws in 1898. He was an assistant lecturer in Latin at the university from 1896 to 1898, when he was called to the bar. He lectured in law from 1903 and became a professor and faculty dean in 1910. Appointed to the New South Wales Legislative Council as a Nationalist in 1917, from 1929 to 1946 he was president of the council; he was both the last president appointed directly by the governor, and the first elected by his fellow councillors. Peden died in Paddington in 1946.

== Early life and background ==
John Beverley Peden was born on 26 April 1871, the second son and sixth child of Magnus Jackson Peden, merchant and farmer, later mayor of Randwick and of Bega, and his wife Elizabeth Neathway Brown. His maternal family had migrated to Australia in the 1820s and his paternal family in the 1830s. His Grandfather, David Peden, was an Alderman of the Sydney Municipal Council from 1849 to 1853. Peden was educated at Bega Public School and eventually moved to Sydney Grammar School, where he won the Knox prize.

Upon leaving secondary school, Peden matriculated in 1889 to the University of Sydney, from where he graduated with a Bachelor of Arts in 1892 with first-class honours in Latin and in logic and mental philosophy. Following this he commenced law studies and during this time was vice-warden of his residential college, St Paul's College (1892–1898), assistant lecturer in Latin (1896), president of the University of Sydney Union (1893–1894 and again in 1910–1911) and of the Undergraduates' Association, and editor of the university literary journal Hermes (1895). In 1898 he graduated with a Bachelor of Laws with first-class honours and the University medal. On 4 August 1898, was called to the Bar of New South Wales and worked in the chambers of Sydney barrister Richard Meares Sly. That same year he also served as joint secretary of Australasian Association for Advancement of Science.

== Legal and academic career ==
Appointed in 1902 a part-time Challis lecturer in the law of property at the university, on 21 December 1904 he married Margaret Ethel Maynard at St Philip's Church, Sydney, and had two daughters, Margaret Elizabeth Maynard Peden and Barbara Constance Wyburn Peden. By 1910 his reputation was significant enough to be appointed Challis Professor of Law for the Sydney Law School, serving concurrently as dean of the faculty, and, consequently, as a fellow of the University of Sydney Senate. In 1913 Peden was appointed a commissioner in the Royal Commission of inquiry into the possibilities of the establishment of a Greater Sydney Council, with the final report expressing that:

Sydney is a magnificent site for a city, but the built upon area has many serious defects for want of co-ordinative town planning, and the way to safeguard against similar defects in its future expansion is to have a comprehensive and careful lay-out of the metropolitan area as soon as possible. Town-planning will make for health, convenience, amenity and economy—its value is incalculable, and its cost comparatively small. Its urgency is a strong reason, both for a Greater Sydney being brought to existence and for the new body giving its immediate and earnest attention.

Peden was also a member of the committee which drafted the Greater Sydney Bill, which nevertheless failed in the Legislative Council in 1915. An authority on Australian and New South Wales constitutional law, in 1921–1931 Peden served as the sole royal commissioner on law reform in New South Wales, acting as a precursor to the Law Reform Commission of New South Wales, and in 1927–1929 was chairman of the Federal Royal Commission on the Commonwealth Constitution. Although appointed as a King's Counsel in December 1922, Peden declined several offers of appointment to the Supreme Court of New South Wales.

Serving as chairman of the professorial board in 1925–1933, Peden was due to retire in April 1941, but offered to volunteer his services for the duration of the war. However, in late 1941 with the university chancellor, Sir Percival Halse Rogers, Sir Colin Davidson and Sir Henry Manning, Peden resigned from the university senate in protest at the appointment of two professors of law to replace himself and Archibald Hamilton Charteris. Nevertheless, Peden was made emeritus professor and retired in 1942.

== Political career ==
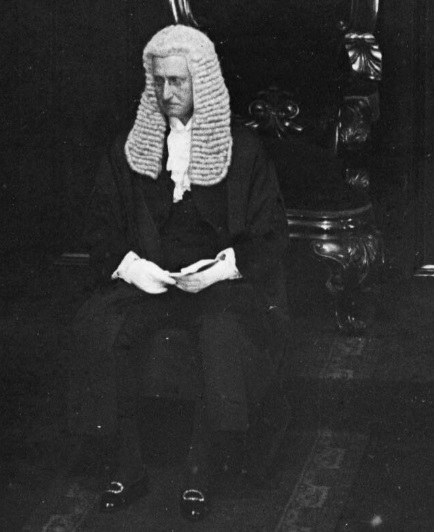
Peden presiding over the State Opening of Parliament, 18 September 1929.

On 6 May 1917 Peden was given a life appointment to the New South Wales Legislative Council by Governor Sir Gerald Strickland on the advice of Premier William Holman, taking up his seat as a Nationalist on 17 July 1917. Appointed by Governor Sir Dudley de Chair as President of the Legislative Council from 1929, Peden was a leader in the opposition to Labor Premier Jack Lang's attempts to abolish the council. He drafted section 7A of the Constitution Act of 1902, added by amendment in 1929, to ensure that the council could not be abolished, nor its powers be altered, except through the expression of the people through a referendum. In the 1930 New Year Honours, Peden was made a Knight Commander of the Order of St Michael and St George (KCMG).

Lang's inability to gain control in the Upper House obstructed his legislative program and, following a long-standing Labor policy to abolish the Legislative Council (Queensland Labor had been similarly successful in 1922), in November 1930, claiming a mandate to abolish the Council, Lang's Labor MLCs put forward two bills, one to repeal section 7A and the other to abolish the Council. Lang had requested Governor Sir Philip Game and his predecessor, De Chair, for sufficient appointments to the Legislative Council in order to pass these bills, but on each occasion was met with refusal.

Believing that a referendum was necessary before the bills could become law as per Peden's legal reasoning, the Legislative Council permitted the bills to pass without a division on 10 December. Lang then announced his intention of presenting the bills for Game's Royal assent without a referendum. The following day, two members of the Legislative Council, Thomas Playfair and Arthur Trethowan, applied for and were granted an injunction preventing Lang and his ministers from presenting the bills to the Governor without having held a referendum. Peden, despite being named as the first defendant, did not defend the case as he was convinced of section 7A's validity under the Colonial Laws Validity Act 1865. On 23 December the Supreme Court of New South Wales in the case of Trethowan v Peden, upheld the injunction and ordered the government not to present bills to abolish the council for royal assent, unless ratified by the electors in a referendum. Lang immediately prepared an appeal to the High Court of Australia. In the case of Attorney-General (New South Wales) v Trethowan, the appeal was rejected by a majority of the court. Lang then appealed this decision to the Judicial Committee of the Privy Council in London, however the Privy Council delayed hearing the appeal until April 1932. The appeal was finally resolved with the judgment of the Judicial Committee of the Privy Council on 31 May 1932 which dismissed the appeal by the Government of New South Wales. The bills repealing Section 7A and abolishing the Legislative Council could not therefore be presented to the Governor for assent until they had been passed in a referendum. Faced with other problems, Lang's plans for abolition ultimately failed, culminating in his dismissal by Governor Game in 1932. Peden worked with Lang's successor as Premier, Bertram Stevens, to pass major reforms to replace the appointed Legislative Council by a Council elected by the whole parliament to terms equivalent to four Assembly terms. Another consequence was to make the President of the Council elected by a majority of the elected members, rather than directly appointed by the Governor, making Peden the last individual to be appointed in this way. This was passed by referendum in 1933.

Peden, with his life appointment lapsed, was consequently elected to the new council on 23 April 1934 for a twelve-year term. and was the first elected president of the council. He did not stand for reelection on the expiry of his term, retiring in 1946.

== Later life ==
In later years, Peden served as president of the Japan-Australia Society and was a farmer at his rural property in Cobargo, near Bega. A prominent Anglican, Peden was chancellor of the Anglican dioceses of Bathurst and Newcastle and was involved in drafting a new constitution for the Church of England in Australia. On 22 April 1946, Peden retired from the council and remains the longest-serving president of that body. On his retirement from politics, his colleague Sir Henry Manning noted: "By a proper appreciation of the duties of his office, Sir John, a great scholar, a great statesman, and a great constitutionalist, established traditions for this Chamber and for the public life of New South Wales."

Survived by his two daughters (his wife predeceased him in 1928), a month later he died on 31 May 1946 in the Scottish Hospital, Paddington. Peden was cremated at Northern Suburbs Crematorium after a service at St Andrew's Cathedral, with an address from Bishop of Newcastle, De Witt Batty:

"Sir John could be classed among the great, not only for the high positions he had held and the fund of his knowledge, but for the splendour of his personal character, [...] Sir John's name would always be associated, too,'with the movement for the spiritual autonomy of the Anglican Church in Australia. The first draft of the constitution prepared 20 years ago was entirely the work of Sir John, and it became, and would always remain, a monument to his ability."

A portrait by Henry Hanke is held by the University of Sydney and a bust by Lyndon Dadswell is in Parliament House. On his death, he provided for the establishment of the Sir John Peden Memorial Fund to establish various scholarships and prizes for students at the Sydney Law School.

New South Wales Legislative Council
Preceded by Frederick Flowers	President of the Legislative Council; 1929 – 1946	Succeeded by Ernest Farrar
Academic offices
Preceded by Prof. Pitt Cobbett	Challis Professor of Law at the University of Sydney; Dean of the Sydney Law School; 1910 – 1942	Succeeded by Prof. James Williams
