= Ernest Farrar (politician) =

Politician and trade unionist in New South Wales, Australia

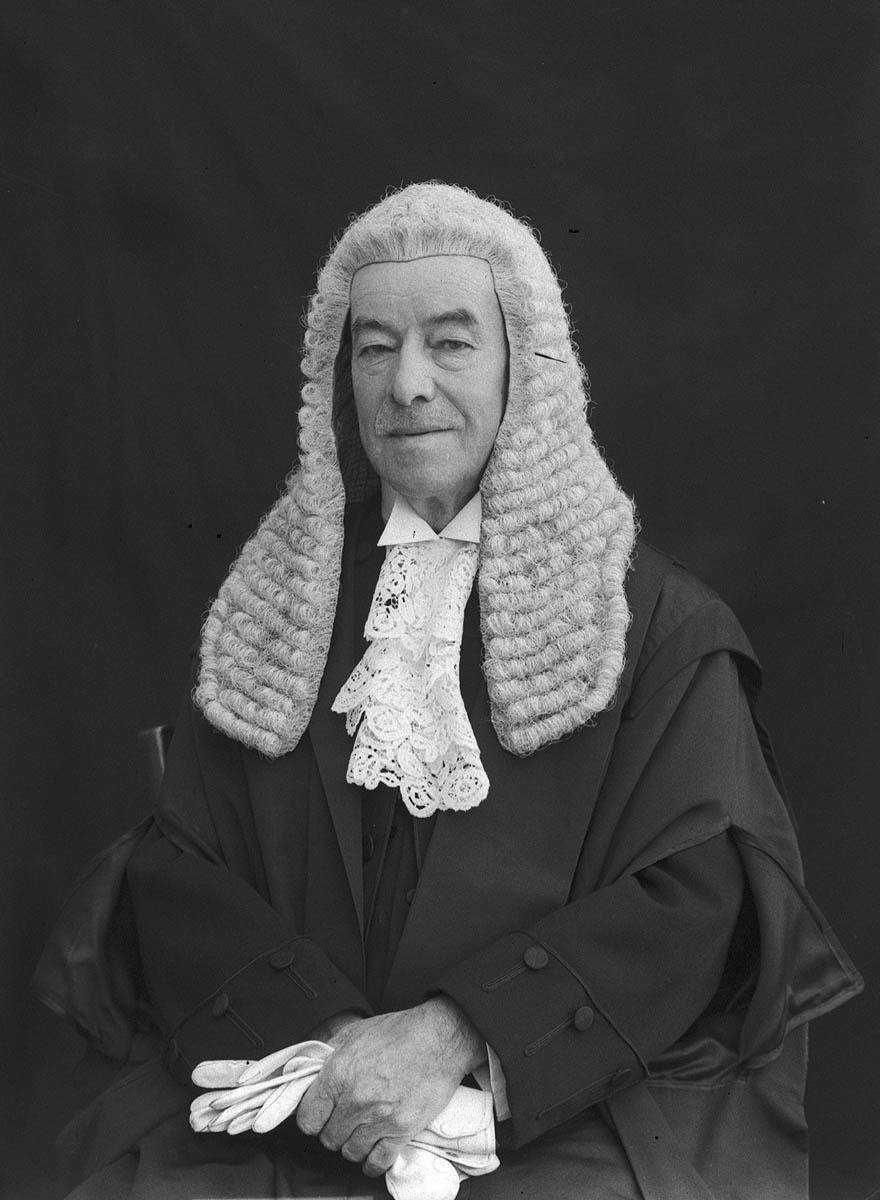

Ernest Henry Farrar (3 February 1879 – 16 June 1952) was an English-born Australian politician.

He was born in Barnsley in Yorkshire to iron moulder Henry Farrar and Mary Elizabeth Buckley. His family migrated to Sydney very soon after his birth and he was educated at Granville and Petersham, becoming a shearer. At the age of seventeen he joined the Australian Workers' Union, and travelled around Tasmania and New Zealand as a saddle maker. In 1902 he helped to found the Saddle and Harness Makers' Union, and from 1907 to 1912 he was foundation president and state secretary of the Australian Saddlery Trades Federation. In 1908 he married Susan Whitfield, with whom he had one son.

He was also a member of the Trades and Labor Council from 1906 and its president in 1910. From 1908 to 1916 he was a member of the Labor Party's central executive, serving as its vice-president in 1909, 1911 and from 1915 to 1916, and as its president from 1912 to 1914.

In 1912 he was appointed to the New South Wales Legislative Council. He left the Labor Party in the 1916 Labor split over conscription, following fellow pro-conscription members into the Nationalist Party. He was Minister for Labour and Industry from 1922 to 1925 and from 1927 to 1930. Later a member of the United Australia Party and the Liberal Party, he was Chairman of Committees from 1934 to 1946. The President of the Legislative Council, Sir John Peden, was absent on leave for six months in late 1938 and Farrar was appointed Acting President for this time. Sir John was ill in early 1941 and Farrar acted as Deputy President. Sir John died in 1946 and Farrar was elected to replace him, serving until his death.

Farrer died in Manly on 16 June 1952 (aged 73).

Political offices
Preceded by Edward Kavanagh	Minister for Labour and Industry; 1922 – 1925	Succeeded by Jack Baddeley
Preceded by Jack Baddeley	Minister for Labour and Industry; 1927 – 1930	Succeeded by Jack Baddeley
New South Wales Legislative Council
Preceded by Broughton O'Conor	Chairman of Committees; 1934 – 1946	Succeeded by Thomas Steele
Preceded by Sir John Peden	President; 1946 – 1952	Succeeded by William Dickson
Party political offices
Preceded by Hector Lamond	President of the Australian Labor Party (NSW Branch); 1912 – 1914	Succeeded by Richard Meagher
