= Wes Fang =

Australian politician

The Honourable Wes Fang MLC
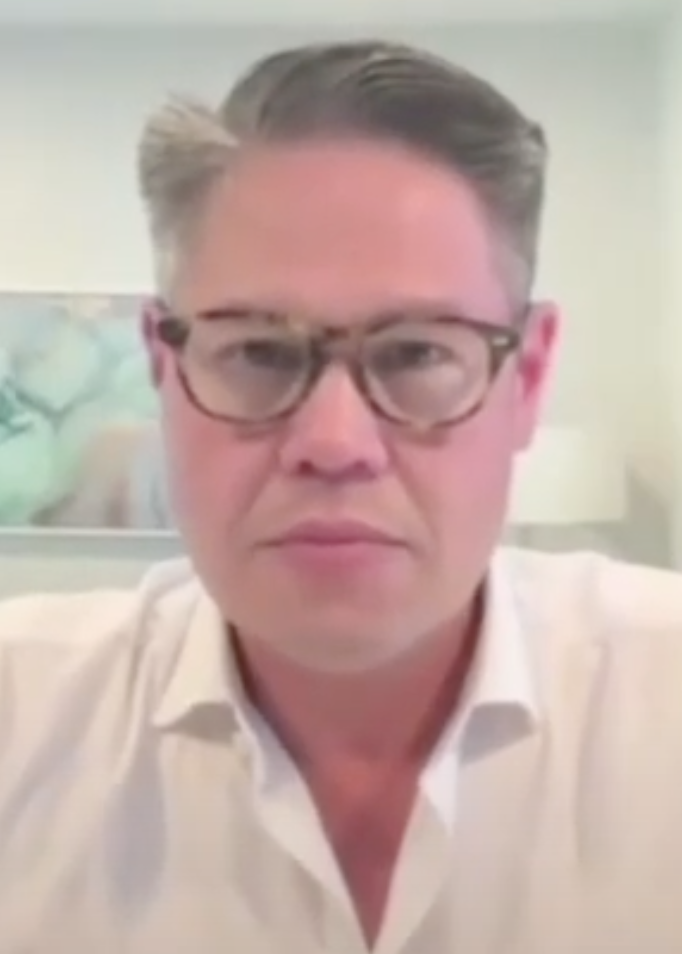

Deputy President of the Legislative Council
- In office 22 March 2022 – 9 May 2023
- President: Matthew Mason-Cox
- Preceded by: Trevor Khan
- Succeeded by: Rod Roberts

Member of the New South Wales Legislative Council
- Incumbent
- Assumed office 9 August 2017
- Preceded by: Duncan Gay

Personal details
- Born: December 1977 (age 48) Wagga Wagga, New South Wales, Australia
- Party: National
- Spouse: Natalie Snyman (2008-2020)
- Education: University of New South Wales
- Occupation: Pilot; Politician

Wesley Joseph Fang (born December 1977) is an Australian politician. He has been a NSW Nationals member of the New South Wales Legislative Council since 9 August 2017, when he filled a casual vacancy caused by the resignation of Duncan Gay.

Fang is the first person of Chinese heritage to represent the Nationals in the New South Wales Parliament. Fang holds a degree in aviation from the University of New South Wales and was formerly a pilot with the Australian Army and Telstra Child Flight. He was a director of the Wagga Wagga Business Chamber and founded the Wagga Ratepayers' Community. Fang ran as a National Party candidate on the Coalition's New South Wales Senate ticket at the 2016 federal election.

Fang was elected as the Deputy President and Chair of Committees of the Legislative Council in March 2022 following a vote of the council.

== Controversies ==
In June 2024, Fang made a post on social media criticising leader of the Liberal Party Mark Speakman over a visit to Wagga Wagga, he subsequently lost his roles as a shadow assistant minister.

In September 2024, Fang was ejected from a budget estimates committee meeting of the Legislative Council due to repeatedly talking over the top of other members.

New South Wales Legislative Council
Preceded by Trevor Khan	Deputy President; 2022–2023	Succeeded by Rod Roberts
