= One Nation New South Wales =

One Nation New South Wales Pauline Hanson's One Nation New South Wales Division
- Abbreviation: One Nation; PHON
- President: Rebecca Thompson
- Leader: Mike Newman
- Preceded by: One Nation NSW
- Headquarters: 3/36 Vincent Street, Cessnock, New South Wales
- Ideology: Hansonism; Australian nationalism; National conservatism; Right-wing populism
- Political position: Right-wing to far-right
- National affiliation: One Nation
- Colours: Orange
- Legislative Assembly: 0 / 93
- Legislative Council: 0 / 42
- House of Representatives: 2 / 47 (NSW seats)
- Senate: 1 / 12 (NSW seats)
- Local Government: 3 / 1,480

Website
- nsw.onenation.org.au

One Nation New South Wales (Note: Officially known as Pauline Hanson's One Nation – New South Wales) is the New South Wales branch of One Nation.

== Background and history ==
=== 1990s ===
Capitalising off the success of the Queensland division of the party at the 1998 Queensland state election, One Nation New South Wales contested the 1999 New South Wales state election under the leadership of David Oldfield, Oldfield had previously served as the parties lead senate candidate at the 1998 Australian federal election in the state of New South Wales, but fell short of being elected. He was elected to the New South Wales Legislative Council that year as the parties sole MP, with his deputy Brian Burston just missing out on securing a second seat for the party.

=== 2000s ===
In 2000, Oldfield was expelled from One Nation by Pauline Hanson, his expulsion led to the division of the NSW branch of the party into two camps, those who supported Oldfield, and those who supported Hanson and the federal party. Oldfield took advantage of the electoral laws of New South Wales, and registered a splinter party called One Nation NSW, which claimed to be the legitimate One Nation body in the state, much to the annoyance of Hanson.

=== 2017–present ===
Since the demise of Oldfield's One Nation NSW, as well as the party's collapse at the federal level, the party had little presence in New South Wales and received minimal attention, however the resurgence of One Nation at the 2016 Australian federal election provided an opportunity for the parties return to state politics, in 2017, NSW One Nation published its party constitution.

In 2018, former federal Labor leader Mark Latham joined One Nation as the party's leader in New South Wales.

At the 2019 state election, One Nation won two seats on the Legislative Council, which were won by Mark Latham and Rod Roberts.

For the 2023 state election, the party announced it would contest in more electorates. Outgoing MP for Bankstown Tania Mihailuk joined One Nation and contested the Legislative Council. Mark Latham also successfully contested the Legislative Council, having resigned from his seat creating a casual vacancy to run for another term. The vacancy was filled by former Legislative Assembly member Tania Mihailuk.

MLC Rod Roberts was elected as Deputy President of the Legislative Council during the 58th Parliament of New South Wales, he had previously served as Assistant President.

Latham was removed as leader by the national party executive on 14 August 2023. Roberts supported Latham against Hanson in the ensuing dispute, claiming that Hanson's decision to appoint perennial candidate Steve Mav as NSW party treasurer was misguided. On 22 August 2023, Mark Latham left the party to become an independent, he was joined by his colleague Rod Roberts.

The departure of Latham and Roberts left Mihailuk as the sole One Nation MLC, and she would later become state leader on 10 December 2023.

Mihailuk announced her resignation both as leader of One Nation and from the party itself on 20 December 2024, leaving One Nation with no representation in the New South Wales parliament.

On 8 December 2025, former Deputy Prime Minister Barnaby Joyce announced he would be joining One Nation, with the expectation he would also head the One Nation Senate ticket in NSW in 2028.

In August 2026, One Nation announced that their state leader going into the 2027 state election would be former state investment commissioner Mike Newman, Newman announced his candidacy for the seat of Cessnock.

== Electoral performance ==
=== New South Wales ===
Election year	Legislative Assembly				Legislative Council			
Election year	# votes	% votes	# seats	+/–	# votes	% votes	# seats	+/–
1999	281,147	▲7.53	0 / 93	0	225,668	▲6.34	1 / 42	▲1
2019	49,948	▼1.10	0 / 93	0	306,933	▲6.90	2 / 42	▲2
2023	84,683	▲1.80	0 / 93	0	273,496	▼5.92	3 / 42	▲1

== Members ==
=== Leaders ===
#	Leader	Electorate	Term start	Term end	Time in office	Elections contested	Premier (term)
1	David Oldfield	Legislative Council	27 March 1999	8 October 2000	1 year, 195 days	none	Carr 1995-2005
-	No leader during this interim						
2	Brian Burston	— (2010–2016)	31 March 2010	17 June 2018	8 years, 78 days	2011, 2015	Keneally 2009-2011
2	Brian Burston	— (2010–2016)	31 March 2010	17 June 2018	8 years, 78 days	2011, 2015	O'Farrell 2011–2014
2	Brian Burston	Senator for New South Wales	31 March 2010	17 June 2018	8 years, 78 days	2011, 2015	Baird 2014–2017
2	Brian Burston	Senator for New South Wales	31 March 2010	17 June 2018	8 years, 78 days	2011, 2015	Berejiklian 2017–2021
3	Mark Latham	— (2018–2019)	7 November 2018	14 August 2023	4 years, 280 days	2019, 2023	Berejiklian 2017–2021
3	Mark Latham	Legislative Council (2019–2023)	7 November 2018	14 August 2023	4 years, 280 days	2019, 2023	Berejiklian 2017–2021
4	Tania Mihailuk	Legislative Council	10 December 2023	20 December 2024	1 year, 10 days	none	Berejiklian 2017–2021
4	Tania Mihailuk	Legislative Council	10 December 2023	20 December 2024	1 year, 10 days	none	Dominic Perrottet 2021–2023
4	Tania Mihailuk	Legislative Council	10 December 2023	20 December 2024	1 year, 10 days	none	Chris Minns 2023–present
-	No leader during this interim						
5	Mike Newman	—	28 August 2026	Incumbent	84 days	—	Chris Minns 2023–present

=== Current MPs ===
Senator Sean Bell (NSW), 2025–present

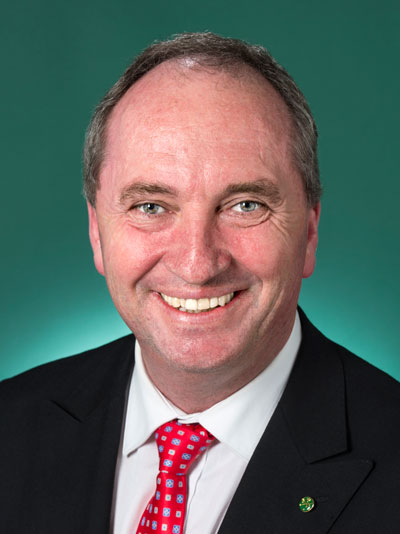
Barnaby Joyce MP (New England), 2025–present

David Farley MP (Farrer), 2026–present

=== Former MPs ===
==== Federal Parliament ====
- Senator Brian Burston (2016–2017), elected at the 2016 election, resigned after falling out with Pauline Hanson and joined the United Australia Party in 2017
- Senator Warwick Stacey (2025), elected at the 2025 election, resigned from the Senate due to health issues, replaced by Sean Bell

==== State Parliament ====
- David Oldfield MLC (1999–2000), broke from the federal party and formed One Nation NSW in 2000, later became an independent in 2004
- Mark Latham MLC (2019–2023), left the party after being removed as state leader, became an independent
- Rod Roberts MLC (2019–2023), joined his colleague Mark Latham in leaving the party, becoming an independent
- Tania Mihailuk MLC (2023–2024), resigned and left the party, became an independent
