= Fred Flowers =

Politician and house painter in New South Wales, Australia

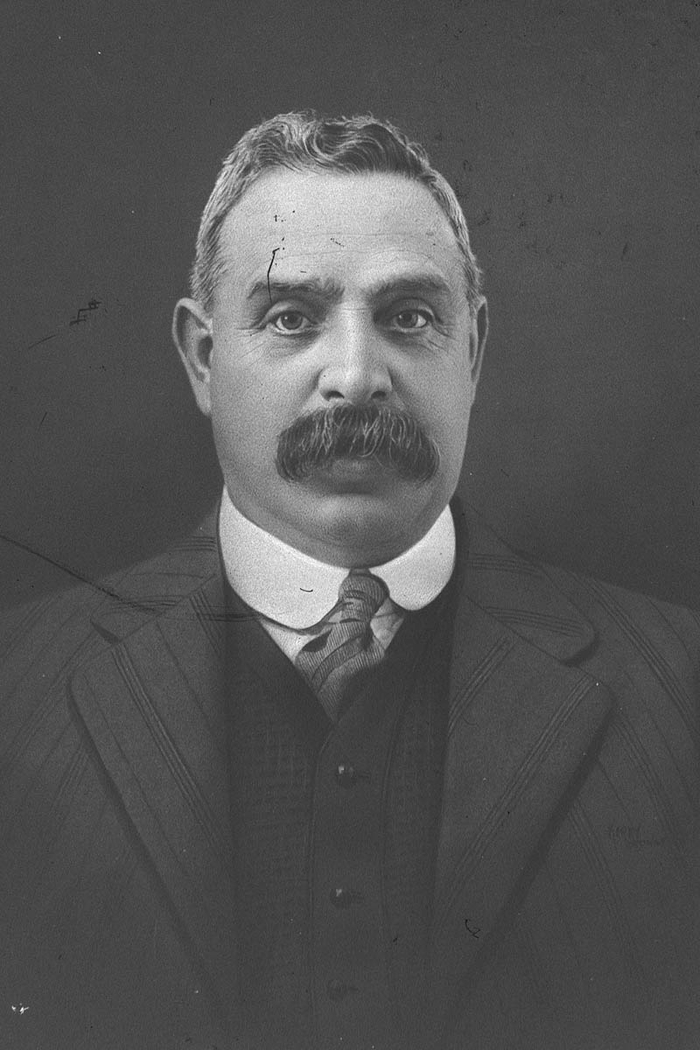

Member of the New South Wales Legislative Council
- In office 12 June 1900 – 14 December 1928

Personal details
- Born: 4 March 1864; Staffordshire, England
- Died: 14 December 1928 (aged 64); Strathfield, New South Wales
- Resting place: South Head Cemetery

Frederick Flowers (4 March 1864 – 14 December 1928) was an English-born Australian politician.

== Early life ==
He was born in Dilhorne in Staffordshire to gardener William Flowers and Dorothy Robinson. He migrated to New South Wales around 1882 and worked as a painter and plasterer.

== Personal life ==
On 26 January 1888 he married Annie Foster, with whom he had four children.

== Career ==
He joined the United Painters' Trade Society and was its representative on the Trades and Labor Council, of which he was vice-president in 1892. In 1894 he was chairman of the Labor Electoral League, and he was the first president of the Political Labor League from 1895 to 1898. In 1900 he was appointed to the New South Wales Legislative Council as a rare Labor nominee. With the election of a Labor government in 1910 he became vice-president of the Executive Council, and led the government in the upper house. He was Secretary for Lands from August to November 1911, Colonial Secretary for a few weeks in November 1911, Minister of Public Instruction from November 1911 to February 1912, and Minister of Public Health from 1914 to 1915. In 1915 he was elected President of the Council. He split with the Labor Party over conscription in the 1916 Labor split, however he did not join the Nationalist Party.

Flowers remained President until his death at Strathfield on 14 December 1928 (aged 64).

Parliament of New South Wales
Political offices
Preceded by John Hughes	Representative of the Government in the Legislative Council; 1910–1915	Succeeded by John Fitzgerald
Preceded by John Hughes	Vice-President of the Executive Council; 1910–1915	Succeeded by John Fitzgerald
Preceded by Niels Nielsen	Secretary for Lands; 1911	Succeeded by George Beeby
Preceded by Donald Macdonell	Colonial Secretary and Registrar of Records; 1911	Succeeded by James McGowen
Preceded by Campbell Carmichael	Minister of Public Instruction; 1911–1912	Succeeded by Campbell Carmichael
New title	Minister for Public Health; 1914–1915	Succeeded by George Black
New South Wales Legislative Council
Preceded by Sir Francis Suttor	President of the Legislative Council; 1915–1928	Succeeded by John Peden
