= Trevor Khan =

Australian politician

His Honour Magistrate Trevor Khan
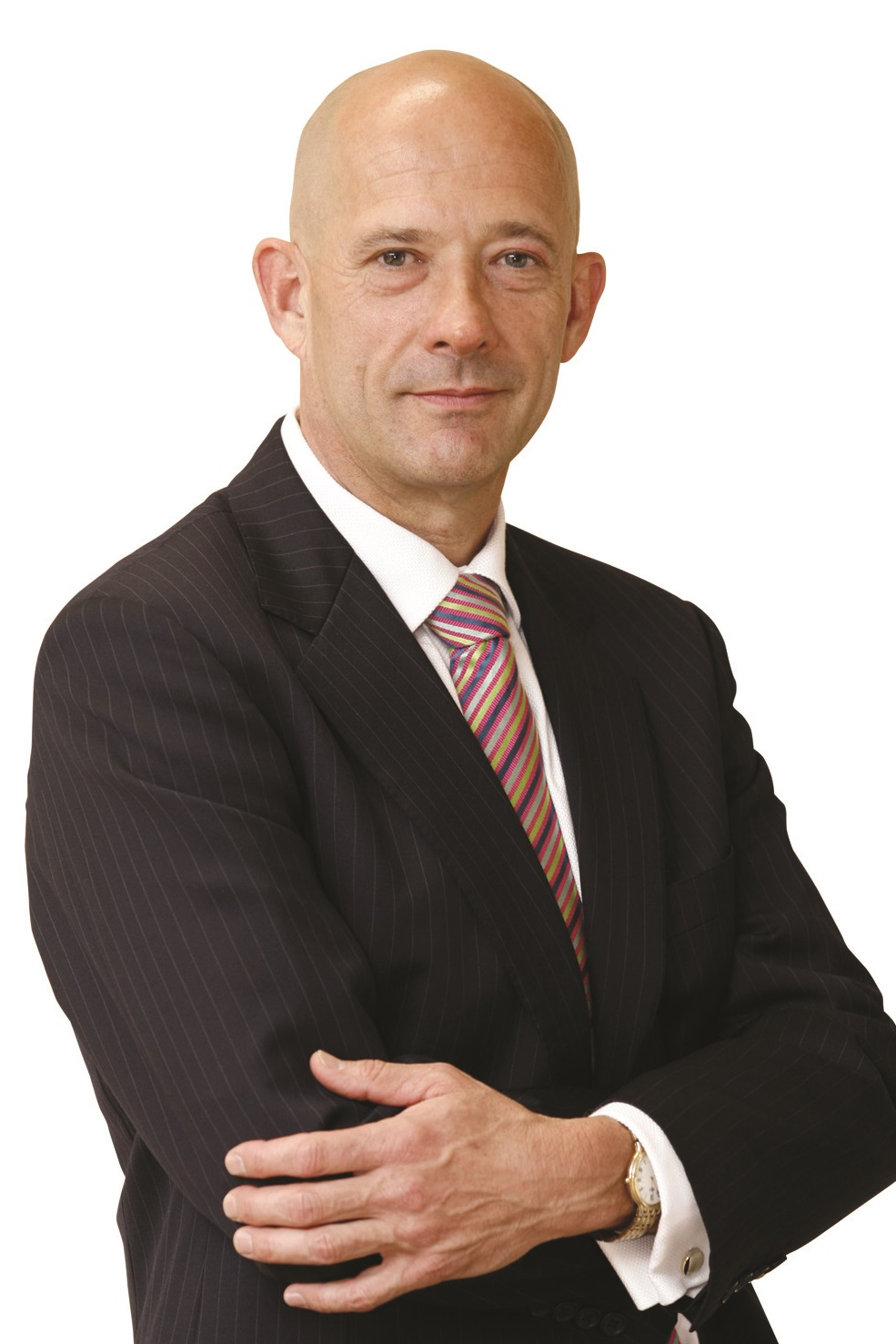
- Khan in 2009

Magistrate of the Local Court of New South Wales
- Incumbent
- Assumed office 3 February 2022

Deputy President of the Legislative Council
- In office 5 May 2015 – 6 January 2022
- Preceded by: Jenny Gardiner
- Succeeded by: Wes Fang

Member of Legislative Council of New South Wales
- In office 24 March 2007 – 6 January 2022
- Succeeded by: Scott Barrett

Personal details
- Born: 12 October 1957 (age 69) Wollongong, New South Wales
- Party: The Nationals

Trevor John Khan (born 12 October 1957) is an Australian magistrate and former politician who served as a Nationals member of the New South Wales Legislative Council between 24 March 2007 and 6 January 2022, including for a time as Deputy President and Chair of Committees.

== Background and early career ==
Khan attended Illawarra Grammar School in Wollongong from 1962 to 1975. While attending school, his teachers were able to identify that he had dyslexia. Khan was put through a special reading program at that school and was able to leave school with a Higher School Certificate in 1975.

After school, he was employed as a Personnel Officer and was also an Industrial Relations Officer for Australian Paper Manufacturers. He attended the University of New South Wales and completed a Bachelor of Jurisprudence and a Bachelor of Laws from that university. He was subsequently admitted as a lawyer of the Supreme Court of New South Wales in 1985.

Khan moved to Tamworth in 1985, where he practised as a lawyer with principally criminal and family law practice areas. Having become an Accredited Special Advocate, Khan was well known on the court circuit of north-western New South Wales. He became a partner in Egan Murphy solicitors 1990, a role he retained until his election to Parliament. As a lawyer, he was a member of the Family Issues Committee of the New South Wales Law Society.

== Political career ==
In 2004, he unsuccessfully stood as the Nationals candidate in the regional NSW seat of New England in the Australian federal election.

Khan was number eight on the joint Liberal/National election ticket for the 2007 New South Wales state election, and having been elected to the Legislative Council, he commenced his first term as a Member of NSW Parliament in March 2007. He was last of the twenty-one members to be elected at that election.

He has held several roles on Parliamentary Committees, including being the Deputy Chair of the Standing Committee on Social Issues, Chair of the Legislative Council's Privileges Committee, Chair of the Joint Standing Committee on Electoral matters, and has sat as a Member of the Joint Standing Committee on the ICAC, the Committee on the Ombudsman, the Law Enforcement Commission and the Crime Commission, and the Standing Committee on Law and Justice.

Khan was also a Member of the NSW Parliamentary Working Group on Marriage Equality which introduced the Same-Sex Marriage Bill 2013 into the Legislative Council, and served as a Member of the Select Committee on the Partial Defence of Provocation which resulted in amendments to the law of provocation in NSW including the abolition of the homosexual advance defence.

Khan was re-elected to the Parliament of NSW at the 2015 NSW state election, and held the office of Deputy President and Chair of Committees of the Legislative Council, deputising for the President of the Legislative Council, and chairing the 'Committee of the Whole' process in the Legislative Council chamber.

Khan was a Member of the NSW Parliamentary Working Group on Assisted Dying which introduced the Voluntary Assisted Dying Bill 2017 into the Legislative Council.

Khan resigned from the Legislative Council on 6 January 2022.

== Appointment as magistrate ==
Three weeks after his resignation from the Legislative Council, Khan was appointed as a magistrate on the Local Court of New South Wales in Campbelltown, taking office from 3 February 2022. His appointment was praised by government and independent members of parliament.

== Personal life ==
Khan's grandfather, Fazee Gulum Mohammed Khan, was a Muslim immigrant born in the Punjab region of British India who arrived in Australia in the 1890s. Regarding his early family members, Khan remarked that they "faced a range of challenges... The challenges they faced were not Left/Right, they were the challenges of ignorance and fear." He is married to Elizabeth (Libby) and has two children.

New South Wales Legislative Council
Preceded by Jenny Gardiner	Deputy President; 2015–2022	Succeeded by Wes Fang
