= Tania Mihailuk =

Australian politician (born 1976)

The Honourable Tania Mihailuk MLC
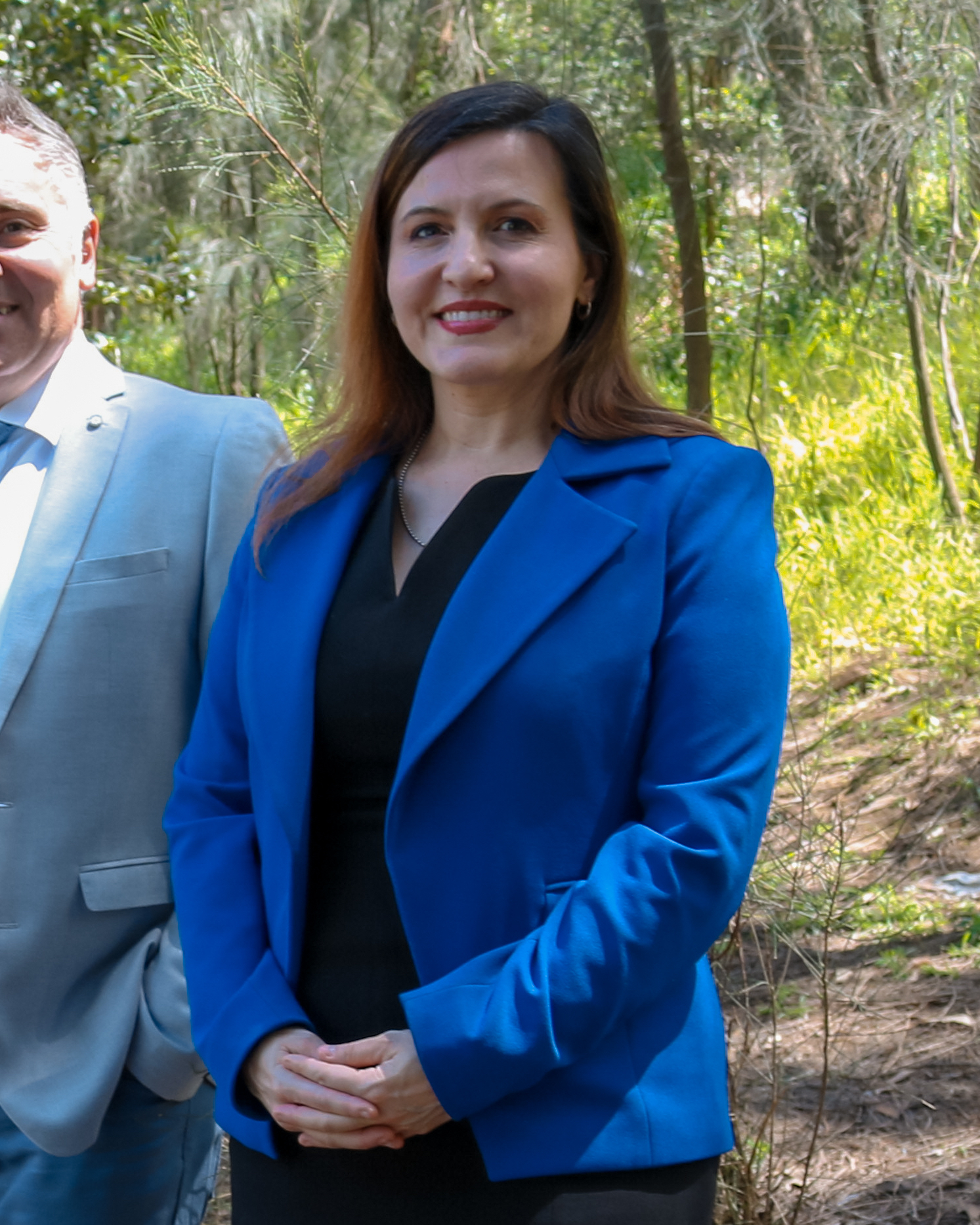

Shadow Minister for Natural Resources
- In office 12 June 2021 – 23 September 2022
- Preceded by: Paul Scully
- Succeeded by: Courtney Houssos

Shadow Minister for Planning
- In office 27 November 2018 – 3 July 2019
- Preceded by: Michael Daley (Planning and Infrastructure)
- Succeeded by: Adam Searle (Planning and Better Living)

Shadow Minister for Housing
- In office 27 November 2018 – 3 July 2019
- Preceded by: Herself (Social Housing)
- Succeeded by: Ryan Park (Housing and Homelessness)

Shadow Minister for Family and Community Services
- In office 9 April 2015 – 3 July 2019
- Preceded by: Linda Burney
- Succeeded by: Penny Sharpe

Shadow Minister for Mental Health
- In office 9 April 2015 – 27 November 2018
- Preceded by: Sophie Cotsis
- Succeeded by: Walt Secord

Shadow Minister for Medical Research
- In office 9 April 2015 – 27 November 2018
- Preceded by: Sonia Hornery (Science and Medical Research)
- Succeeded by: Walt Secord

Shadow Minister for Social Housing
- In office 9 April 2015 – 27 November 2018
- Preceded by: Sophie Cotsis (Housing)
- Succeeded by: Herself (Housing)

Shadow Minister for Fair Trading
- In office 21 October 2011 – 8 April 2015
- Preceded by: Cherie Burton

Shadow Minister for Healthy Lifestyles
- In office 21 October 2011 – 8 April 2015
- Preceded by: Cherie Burton

Shadow Minister for Volunteering and Youth
- In office 21 October 2011 – 8 April 2015
- Preceded by: Cherie Burton

Member of the New South Wales Legislative Council
- Incumbent
- Assumed office 10 May 2023
- Preceded by: Mark Latham

Leader of One Nation New South Wales
- In office 10 December 2023 – 20 December 2024
- Preceded by: Mark Latham
- Succeeded by: Mike Newman

Member of the New South Wales Legislative Assembly for Bankstown
- In office 26 March 2011 – 1 March 2023
- Preceded by: Tony Stewart
- Succeeded by: Jihad Dib

51st Mayor of Bankstown
- In office 1 September 2006 – 27 June 2011
- Preceded by: Helen Westwood
- Succeeded by: Khal Asfour

Personal details
- Born: 5 May
- Party: Independent (2022–2023, 2024–)
- Other political affiliations: Labor (until 2022); One Nation (2023–2024)
- Education: Macquarie University
- Occupation: Politician
- Website: taniamihailukmlc.com.au

Tania Mihailuk (Note: Russian: Таня Михайлюк, romanized: Tanya Mikhaylyuk, Russian: [ˈtanʲə mʲɪxɐˈjlʲuk]; Ukrainian: Таня Михайлюк, romanized: Tanya Mykhaylyuk, Ukrainian: [ˈtanʲɐ mɪxɐjˈlʲuk]) (born 5 May) is an Australian politician, currently serving as member of the New South Wales Legislative Council since 2023. She served as mayor of the City of Bankstown from 2006 to 2011.

Mihailuk was the first woman to represent Bankstown in the electoral district's history, serving in the New South Wales Legislative Assembly from 2011 to 2023. She initially served as a member of the Labor Party before resigning from the party in 2022. She joined One Nation in January 2023 and ran for the Legislative Council on the party's ticket at the March election, at which she was unsuccessful. Mihailuk was appointed to the New South Wales Legislative Council on 10 May 2023, filling a casual vacancy created by the resignation of Mark Latham, shortly before the 2023 New South Wales state election. She left One Nation to become an independent in December 2024.

== Early life ==
Mihailuk is of Russian and Ukrainian descent, with her family being members of the Russian diaspora in China. Her father George, who died on 3 May 2018 (aged 86), was a public servant, historian and coin collector who was born in Harbin to a Russian mother from Vladivostok (Valentina) and a Ukrainian father from Bila Tserkva (Timothy). After attending the Alexander Pushkin Gymnasium in Harbin, he hoped to further his studies in Russia, though the Soviet Union was reluctant to allow him to do so, and thus he travelled the world before settling in Brazil and later Australia, first in Punchbowl in Greater Western Sydney. Like her family, she is a member of the Russian Orthodox Church and celebrates Orthodox Easter.

== Background and education ==
Mihailuk attended Macquarie University and graduated with a degree in economics and in law. She later obtained a Master of Law from the University of Sydney. She has worked in various industries, including marketing and public policy.

== Political career ==
=== Bankstown Council ===
Mihailuk was elected to Bankstown Council in 2004 and became mayor in 2006.

=== Legislative Assembly ===
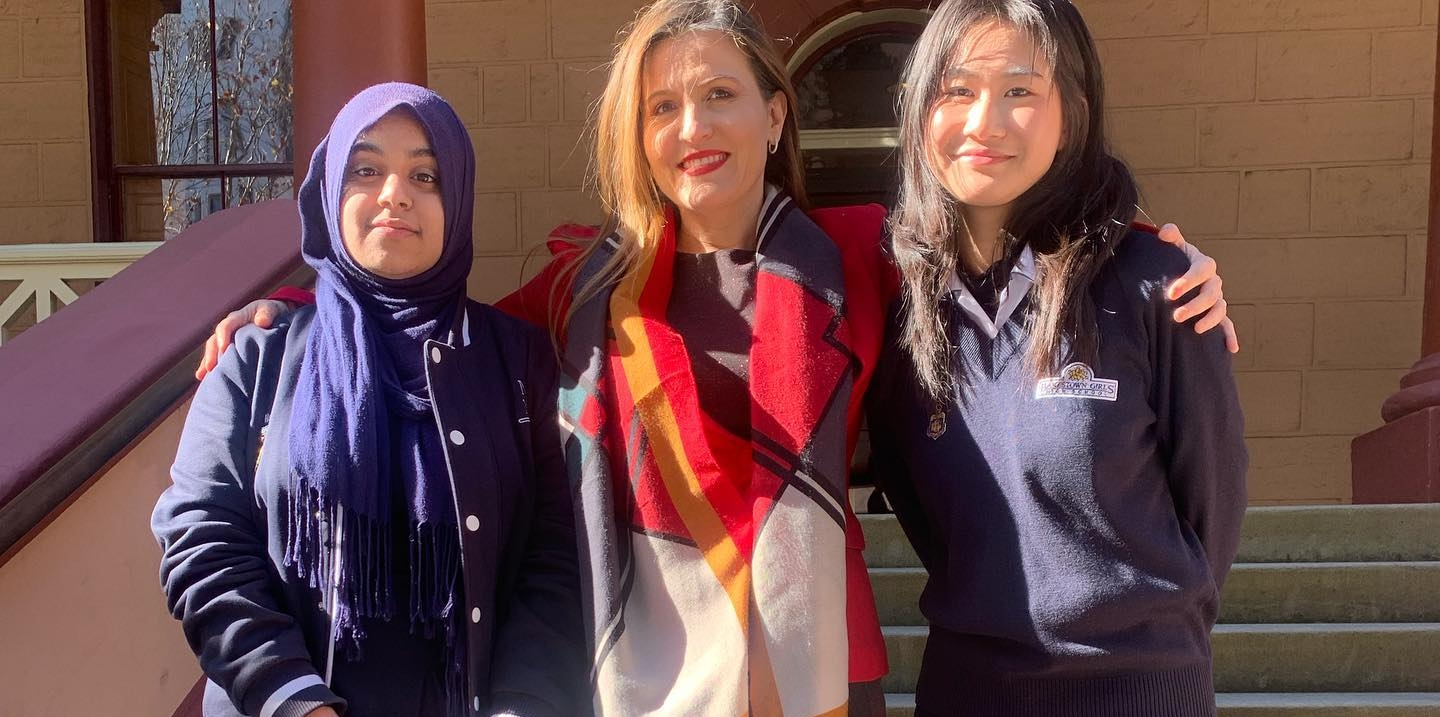
Mihailuk with Bankstown Girls High School students at NSW Parliament.

In November 2010, Mihailuk was endorsed as the Labor candidate for Bankstown after sitting member Tony Stewart announced his resignation. She stated she would resign from council if she won, which she did, having suffered a swing against her of more than 15 points, as part of the Coalition's landslide election win.

On 20 September 2022, Mihailuk used parliamentary privilege to link Canterbury-Bankstown Council mayor, Khal Asfour, to corrupt former Labor Minister Eddie Obeid, which was a stark contrast with her prominent thanks of Asfour in her maiden parliamentary speech for being her campaign director. On 23 September, Labor Opposition Leader, Chris Minns, demoted Mihailuk from the Shadow Cabinet. On 20 October 2022, Mihailuk resigned from the NSW Labor Party, claiming that the party was "plagued by corruption" and that it was "too woke".

=== Legislative Council ===
On 17 January 2023, Mihailuk announced that she would be running second on the One Nation ticket at the upcoming 2023 New South Wales state election for the Legislative Council, behind state party leader Mark Latham. Before that, in 2017 when she was a Labor MP she criticised One Nation and Mark Latham. Mihailuk officially resigned from the New South Wales Legislative Assembly on 1 March 2023. As the second place on the party ticket, she was not successful in her election. However, on 10 May 2023, she was appointed to the Legislative Council to fill the casual vacancy previously held by Latham, who had resigned earlier from the Legislative Council to successfully contest a new 8-year term in the election. Mihailuk would finish off the remainder of Latham's original 8-year in 2027.

Following the sacking of Latham as state party leader by party founder and federal leader Pauline Hanson, Mihailuk became state party leader in December 2023. Mihailuk announced her resignation from One Nation on 20 December 2024.

In addition to her parliamentary work, Mihailuk is a regular political commentator on Sky News Australia, appearing weekly on Prime Time with Danica De Giorgio.

== Notes ==
New South Wales Legislative Assembly
Preceded by Tony Stewart	Member for Bankstown; 2011–2023	Succeeded by Jihad Dib
