= Thomas Steele (Australian politician) =

Politician and soldier in New South Wales, Australia

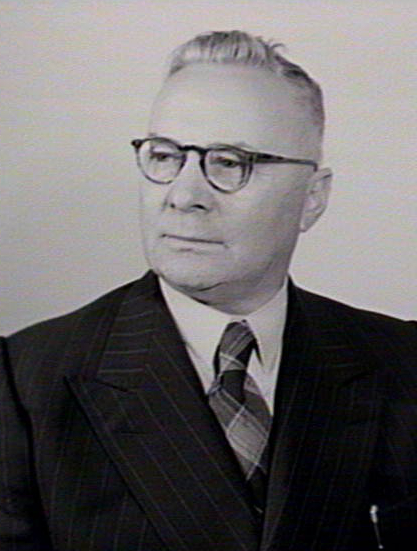

Thomas Steele (25 August 1887 – 3 September 1963) was a politician and soldier in New South Wales, Australia.

He was born in Young to miller Henry Steele and Frances Jell. He was educated at local public schools and worked in a general store before serving in the AIF during World War I. He was a major in the 2nd Division's Field Artillery, and was mentioned in despatches. On 26 August 194 he married Alma Ann Black, with whom he had a daughter. After the war he returned to the general store, later purchasing his own business in Monteagle and acquiring property, on which he ran an orchard. From 1931 to 1933 he was an alderman at Young. In 1934 he was elected to the New South Wales Legislative Council as a member of the Country Party to a term ending in 1937, and was re-elected in 1936, and 1949. He returned to the armed forces in World War II as a lieutenant-colonel. He was elected Chairman of Committees in 1946, serving until 1953. His term on the council expired in 1961 and he was not a candidate for re-election.

Steele died at Crows Nest on 3 September 1963 (aged 76).

New South Wales Legislative Council
Preceded by Ernest Farrar	Chairman of Committees; 1946 – 1953	Succeeded by Ernest Wright
