= Rod Roberts (Australian politician) =

Australian politician

The Honourable Rod Roberts MLC
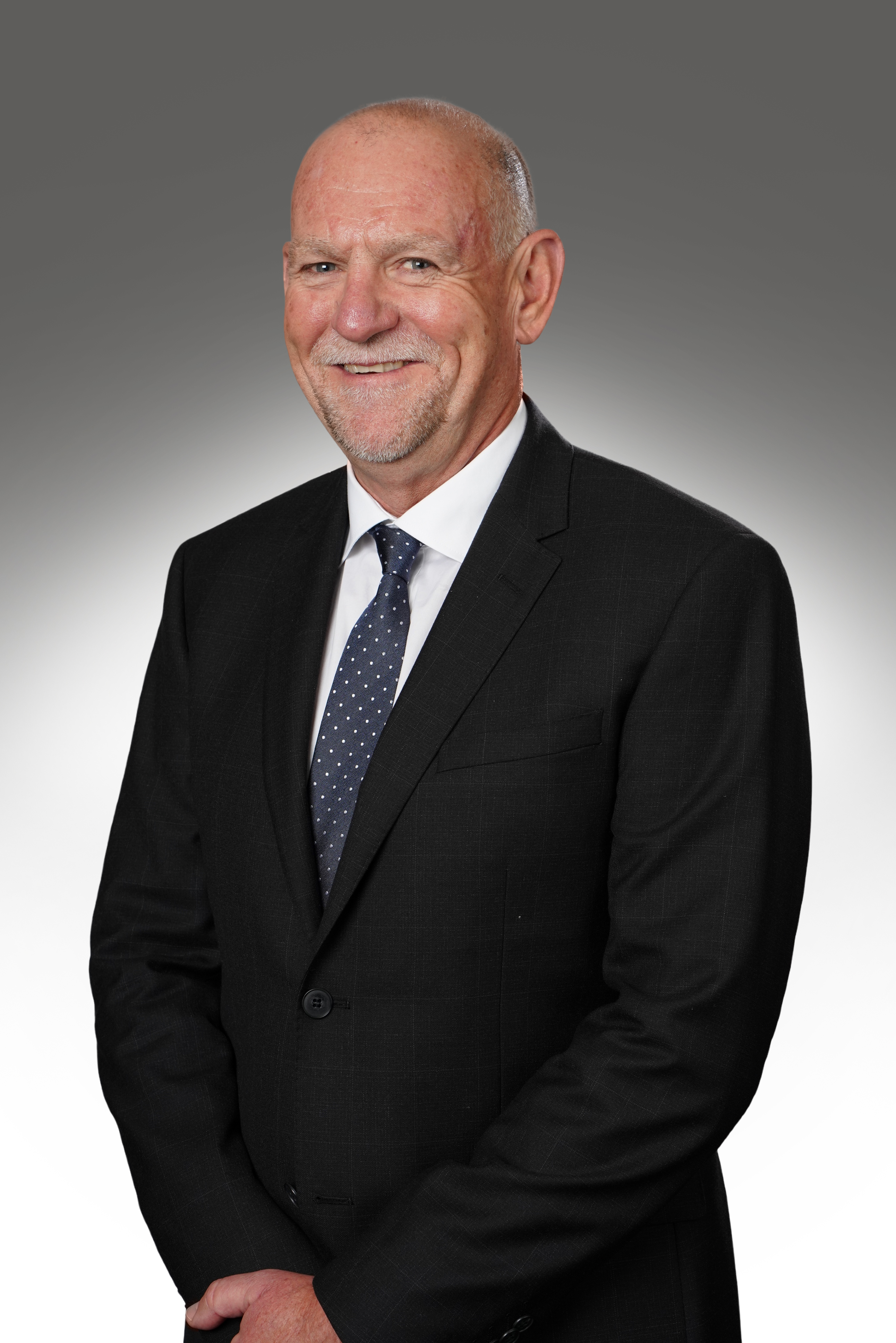

Deputy President of the New South Wales Legislative Council
- Chair of Committees
- Assumed office 9 May 2023
- Preceded by: Wes Fang

Assistant President of the New South Wales Legislative Council
- In office 17 June 2020 – 8 May 2023
- Preceded by: Shaoquett Moselmane
- Succeeded by: Peter Primrose

Member of the New South Wales Legislative Council
- Incumbent
- Assumed office 23 March 2019

Personal details
- Party: Independent (2023–present)
- Other political affiliations: One Nation (up to 2023)
- Occupation: Auctioneer, farmer, police officer and politician
- Police Career
- Allegiance: New South Wales
- Department: New South Wales Police Force
- Branch: Armed Hold Up Squad; Consorting Squad; Drug Squad
- Service years: ~2012
- Rank: Detective Incremental Senior Sergeant
- Sports career
- Country: Australia
- Sport: Cycling
- Club: GPM Stulz Cycling Team NSW

Sports achievements and titles
- National finals: World Duathlon Championships 2015 (competitor), National Road Series (volunteer)
Medal record
Men's cycling
Representing Australia
World Duathlon Championships
National Road Series

Rodney John Roberts is an Australian politician serving as an independent in the NSW Parliament. He was elected to the New South Wales Legislative Council on 23 March 2019 as a member of One Nation and currently serves as the Deputy President and Chair of Committees.

== Background and early career ==
Prior to entering NSW Parliament, Roberts was a Detective Sergeant with the New South Wales Police Force for approximately 20 years. He worked in specialist areas such as the Drug Squad, Armed Hold Up Squad, and the Consorting Squad. He was also a Senior Lecturer at the Police Academy on the Detectives Training Course.

After retiring from the NSW Police Force, Roberts spent approximately 10 years as a licensed real estate agent and auctioneer practising in the Goulburn area.

== Political career ==
Roberts was elected to the Legislative Council at the 2019 New South Wales state election along with his One Nation parliamentary colleague Mark Latham.

In June 2020, Roberts was elected Assistant President of the Legislative Council. He has held several roles on Parliamentary Committees including as a Member of the Joint Standing Committee on the Independent Commission Against Corruption [ICAC], Member of the Standing Committee on Law and Justice, Member of the Procedure Committee, and Deputy Chair of the Select Committee on the Proposal to Raise the Warragamba Dam Wall.

In May 2023, Roberts was elected Deputy President and Chair of Committees of the Legislative Council, deputising for the President of the Legislative Council and chairing the 'Committee of the Whole' process in the Legislative Council chamber. He also currently sits on the Standing Committee on Law and Justice, Selection of Bills Committee, Procedure Committee, and Privileges Committee.

In August 2023, federal One Nation leader Pauline Hanson removed Latham as leader of the NSW branch of the party. Roberts supported Latham against Hanson in the ensuing dispute, claiming that Hanson's decision to appoint perennial candidate Steve Mav as NSW party treasurer was misguided.

== Community involvement ==
In 2015, Rod Roberts represented Australia in the World Duathlon Championships.

In his spare time, Rod Roberts enjoys helping out as a soigneur to the NSW based GPM Stulz Cycling Team that competes in the National Road Series.
