= Harry Budd =

Australian politician

Sir Harry Vincent Budd (18 February 1900 – 8 March 1979) was an Australian politician.

He was born at Murwillumbah to Arthur Budd, later a member of the New South Wales Legislative Assembly, and Annie Knight. He attended the local public school and worked as a journalist, editing the Tweed Daily from 1921 to 1923, when he was taken on by the Sydney Daily Telegraph. From 1931 to 1971 he was managing editor of The Land. On 25 January 1930 he married Colina McDonald White; they had four children. Budd was elected to the New South Wales Legislative Council in 1946, serving as a member of the Country Party. In 1966 he was elected president of the council. He was knighted in 1970, and served as president until his retirement from the council in 1978.

Budd Place, in the Canberra suburb of Gilmore, is named in his honour.
