= Mike Newman =

Australian politician and investment banker

Leader of One Nation in New South Wales
- Incumbent
- Assumed office 28 August 2026
- Preceded by: Tania Mihailuk

Personal details
- Born: Michael Newman; 1971 or 1972 (age 54–55) St Leonards, Sydney, Australia
- Party: One Nation
- Children: 4
- Parent: Maurice Newman (father)
- Education: Macquarie Graduate School of Management
- Occupation: Investment banker, trade commissioner, politician
- Website: nsw.onenation.org.au/mike-newman

Michael Newman (born 1971 or 1972) is an Australian politician, investment banker and former trade commissioner who has served as the leader of Pauline Hanson's One Nation in New South Wales since 28 August 2026. He is the party's candidate for the seat of Cessnock at the 2027 New South Wales state election.

Newman spent approximately 25 years living and working in Japan and is fluent in Japanese. He is the son of businessman and former Australian Broadcasting Corporation chairman Maurice Newman.

== Early life and education ==
Newman holds undergraduate degrees in economics and Japanese studies, and a Master of Management from the Macquarie Graduate School of Management.

== Career ==
Newman spent about 25 years based in Japan. His career in financial services focused on Japanese equities, aerospace, defence, automotive and industrial sectors.

From July 2021 to February 2024, Newman served as Senior Trade and Investment Commissioner for North Asia (Japan and Korea) with Investment NSW, based in Tokyo. In October 2026 it was revealed by a freedom of information request that Newman had racked up $211,000 in taxpayer funded flights, five star hotels and restaurant and bar bill during this role, including a seven-month stay at the Meriton in Sydney and thousands of dollars at Sydney bars and restaurants. Senior public servants repeatedly queried why NSW One Nation leader Mike Newman was charging taxpayers for hotels, trips and restaurant bills, including a $7791 dinner with a Japanese trade delegation which included 71 beers and 23 bottles of wine. Newman's spending came to light after he launched his campaign, where he claimed "There is so much money and waste that is inside the public service" and promised to cut that waste.

== Political career ==
On 28 August 2026, One Nation federal leader Pauline Hanson announced Newman as the party's New South Wales leader and candidate for the Labor-held seat of Cessnock in the Hunter Valley for the March 2027 state election. He was unveiled at a media conference in Singleton alongside federal MP Barnaby Joyce and Legislative Council candidate Stuart Bonds.

== Personal life ==
Newman is married to a Japanese woman. He is fluent in Japanese and has answered media questions in the language.
